= Philip Bainbridge =

Philip Bainbrigge is the name of:

- Lieutenant-General Sir Philip Bainbrigge (1786–1862), British Army officer
- Philip Bainbrigge (died 1918) (1891–1918), killed in action at the Battle of Épehy
