= Stéphane Heuet =

French comics artist

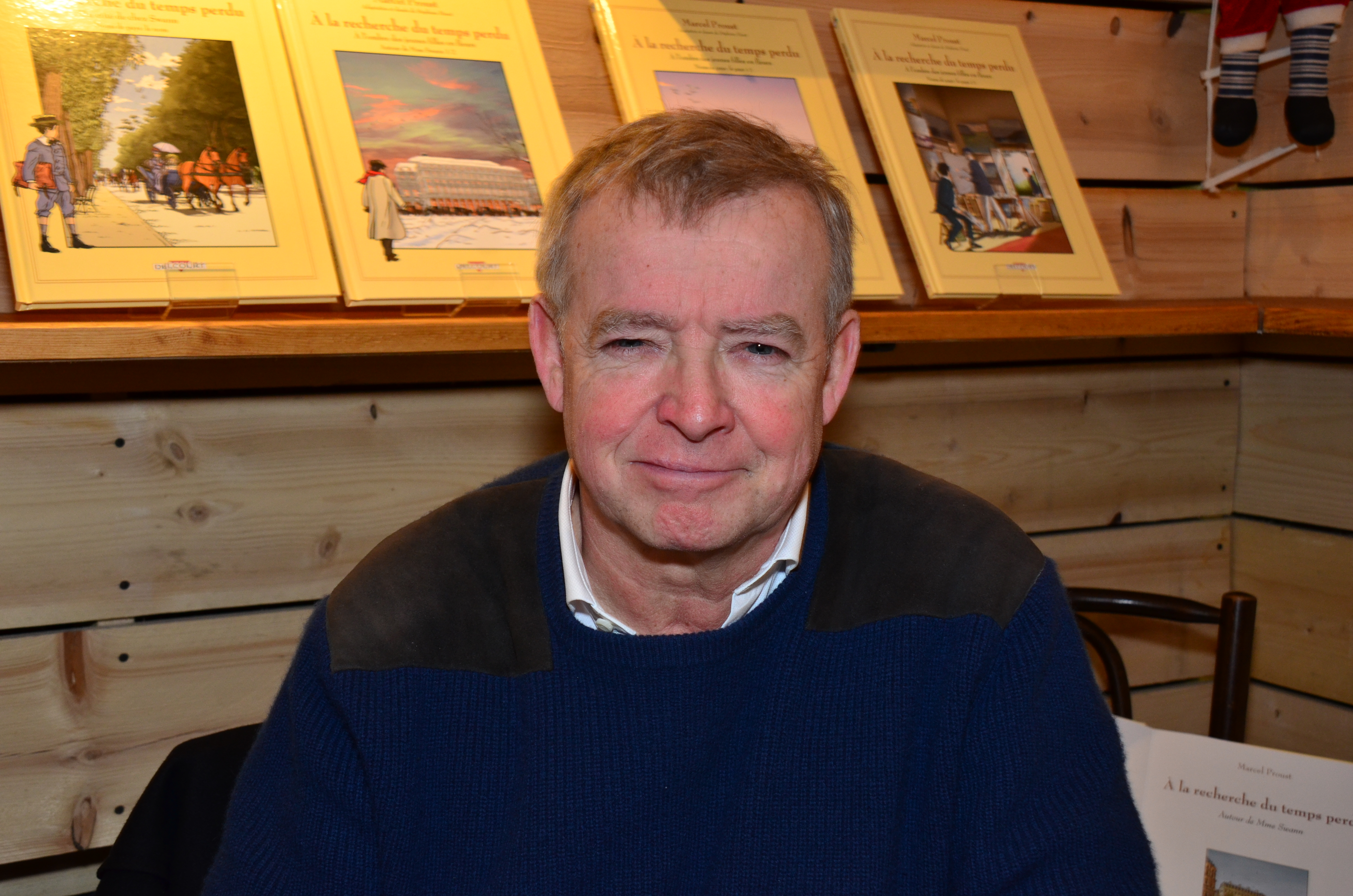
Stéphane Heuet

Stéphane Heuet (Brest) is a French comics artist. He is notable in the Franco-Belgian comics ("BD," Bandes dessinées) genre for having tackled one of the most literary of modern novels, À la recherche du temps perdu by Marcel Proust (1998).

As a break from the Proust project in 2010 he published a collection of 18 maritime stories by authors such as Pierre Mac Orlan and Herman Melville with watercolour illustrations.
