= Involuntary memory =

Memory triggered by an environmental cue

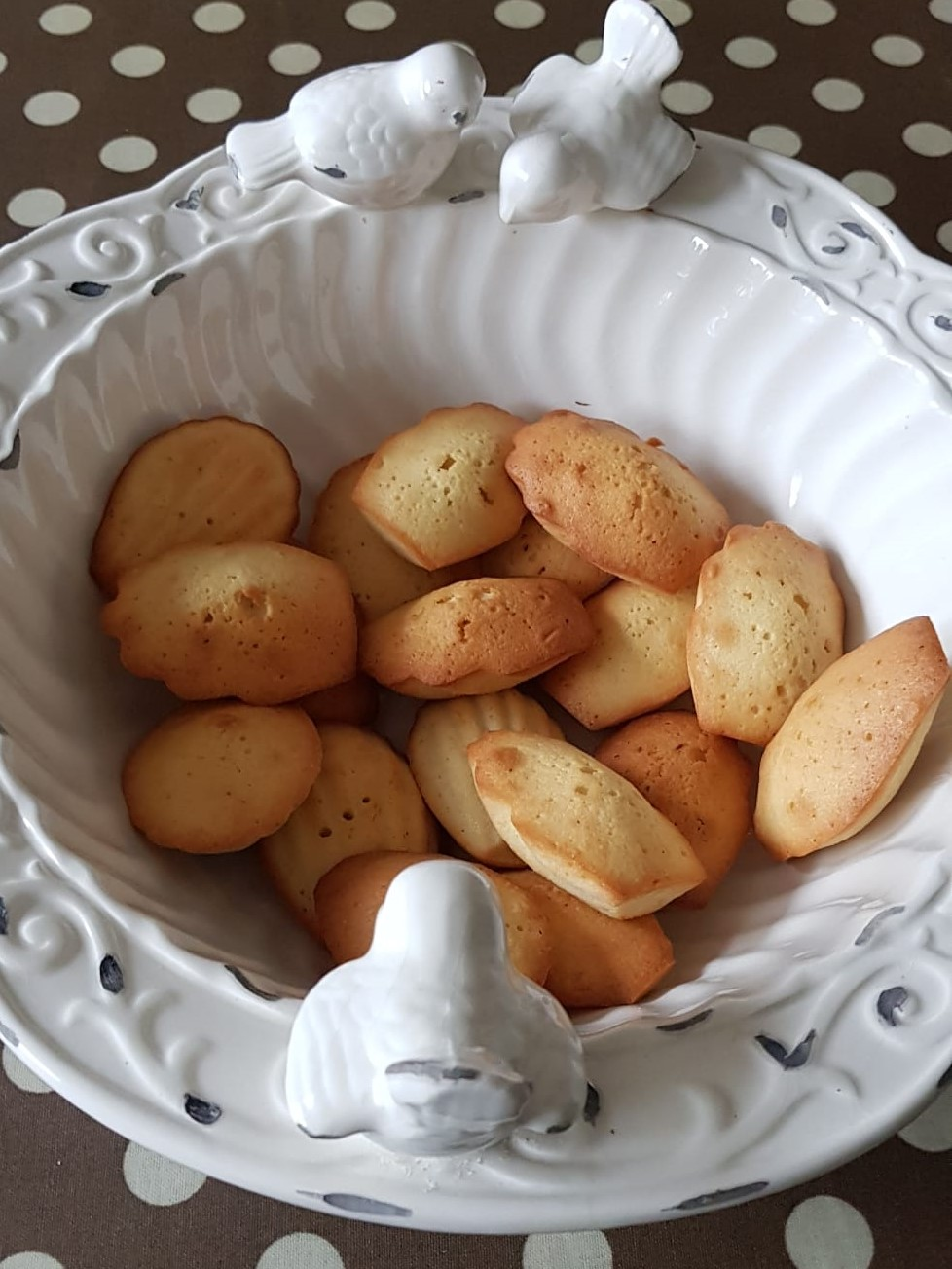
A famous example of involuntary memory is when, in his book In Search of Lost Time, Marcel Proust is reminded of his childhood by the taste of a madeleine cake dunked in tea.

Involuntary memory (Note: Also known as involuntary explicit memory, involuntary conscious memory, involuntary aware memory, madeleine moment, mind pops and most commonly, involuntary autobiographical memory.) is a sub-component of memory that occurs when cues encountered in everyday life evoke recollections of the past without conscious effort. Voluntary memory, its opposite, is characterized by a deliberate effort to recall the past.

== Occurrences ==
There appear to be at least three different contexts within which involuntary memory arises, as described by J.H. Mace in his book Involuntary Memory. These include those that occur in everyday life, those that occur during the processes of voluntary and involuntary recall, and those that occur as part of a psychiatric syndrome.

=== Precious fragments ===
The most common kind of these phenomena has been termed "precious fragments." This type includes involuntary memories as they arise in everyday mental functioning, which are characterized by their element of surprise: they appear to come into conscious awareness spontaneously. They are the products of common every-day experiences such as eating a piece of cake, bringing to mind a past experience evoked by the taste. Research suggests that such experiences are especially strong and frequent in relation to one's sense of smell. The term "precious fragments" was coined by Marigold Linton, a pioneer in the study of autobiographical memory research. This is reflected, for example, in the narrator of Proust's In Search of Lost Time experience of remembering, upon tasting a madeleine cake in adulthood, a memory from childhood that occurred while eating madeleine dunked in tea.

=== By-products of other memories ===
These are less common, and appear to be the result of voluntary/involuntary retrieval. Characteristic of such occurrences is the triggering effect this has, as one involuntary memory leads to another and so on. Again, Linton describes her own experiences with such memories as "coming unbidden sometimes when my mind is silent, but also as by-products of searches for other information." Mace terms these “involuntary memory chains,” stating that they are the product of spreading activation in the autobiographical memory system. These involuntary retrievals are experienced when activations are strong or relevant enough to current cognitive activity that they come into consciousness. According to Mace, this suggests that autobiographical memories are organized primarily conceptually (“experiential type concepts: people, places, locations, activities, etc.”), while temporal associations are not retained over time the same way.

=== Not so precious fragments ===
Finally, some involuntary memories arise from traumatic experiences, and as such are fairly rare compared to other involuntary memories. Subjects describe them as salient, repetitive memories of traumatic events. The troubling nature of such memories makes these occurrences important to clinical researchers in their studies of psychiatric syndromes such as post-traumatic stress disorder. Some researchers have found that involuntary memories tend to have more emotional intensity and less centrality to life story than voluntary memories do. However, one study also shows that recurrent involuntary memories post-trauma can be explained with the general mechanisms of autobiographical memory, and tend to not come up in a fixed, unchangeable form. This suggests that psychologists may be able to develop ways to help individuals deal with traumatic involuntary memories.

=== Implications for dementia ===
Further research on the automatic nature of involuntary retrieval suggests that they may not require working memory input. Thus, one report hypothesizes that people with dementia may still have available precious autobiographical memories that remain inaccessible until “suitable triggers release them,” prodding at the possibility for caregivers to be trained to reactivate these memories to elicit positive emotional effects and maintain patients’ life stories and sense of identity. Further empirical research is needed, but this insight starts a hopeful path into improving dementia care.

== History ==
=== Hermann Ebbinghaus ===
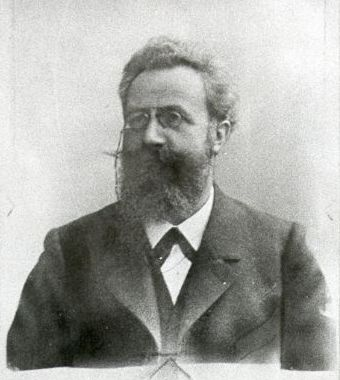
Herman Ebbinghaus (1850–1909).

Born in Barmen, Germany in 1850, Hermann Ebbinghaus is recognized as the first to apply the principles of experimental psychology to studying memory. He is especially well known for his introduction and application of nonsense syllables in studying memory, study of which led him to discover the forgetting curve and the spacing effect, two of his most well-known contributions to the field. Ebbinghaus was also the first to attempt a description of involuntary memory, stating that, "often, even after years, mental states once present in consciousness return to it with apparent spontaneity and without any act of the will; that is, they are reproduced involuntarily." He goes on to explain that these mental states were once experienced, rendering, by definition, their future spontaneous appearance into consciousness the act of remembering, though we may not always be aware of where or how we experienced this information the first time. Ebbinghaus also made the key note that these involuntary reproductions are not random or accidental; instead, "they are brought about through the instrumentality of other immediately present mental images," under the laws of association. This reflects congruence with Mace's and Linton's theory of involuntary memories as by-products of other memories, as discussed above.

=== Marcel Proust—Proustian memory ===
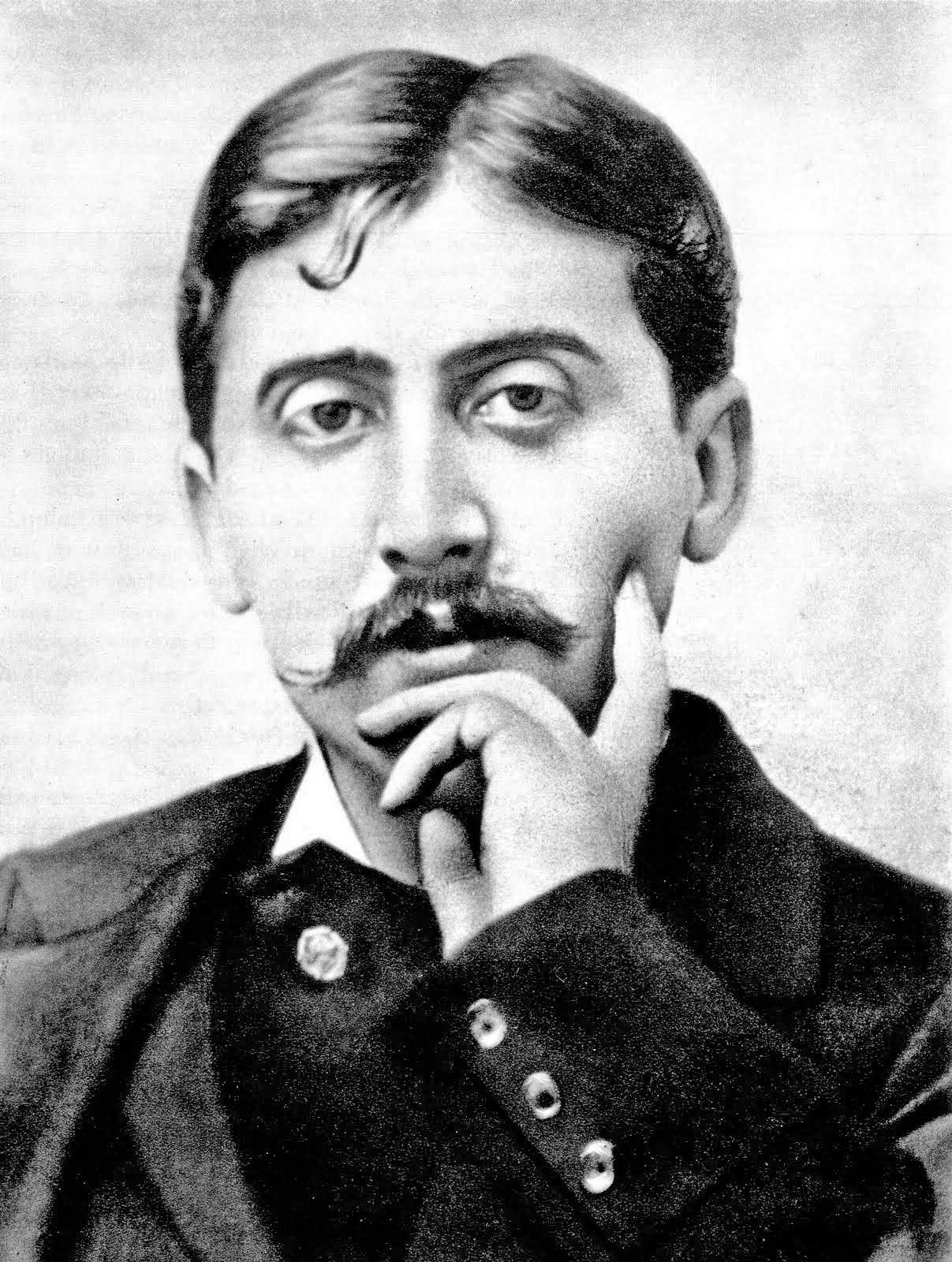
Proust in 1900

Marcel Proust was the first person to coin the term involuntary memory, in his novel À la recherche du temps perdu (In Search of Lost Time or Remembrance of Things Past). Proust did not have any psychological background, and worked primarily as a writer.

Proust viewed involuntary memory as containing the "essence of the past," claiming that it was lacking from voluntary memory. When the protagonist of Proust's novel eats a tea-soaked madeleine, a long-forgotten childhood memory of eating tea-soaked madeleine with his aunt is restored to him. From this memory, he then proceeds to recall the childhood home he was in, and even the town itself. This becomes a theme throughout In Search of Lost Time, with sensations reminding the narrator of previous experiences. Proust dubbed these "involuntary memories".

== Current research ==
=== Chaining ===
One idea that has recently become the subject of studies on involuntary memory is chaining. This is the concept that involuntary memories have the tendency to trigger other involuntary memories that are related. Typically, it is thought to be the contents of involuntary memories that are related to one another, thereby causing the chaining effect.

In a diary study done by J.H Mace, participants reported that frequently, when one involuntary memory arose, it would quickly trigger a series of other involuntary memories. This was recognized as the cueing source for involuntary memories.

In the work by Bernstein, the diary method was also applied to the study of involuntary memory chaining. The main hypothesis was that chaining would also occur on autobiographical memory tasks. Participants were asked to report the presence of involuntary memories while performing an autobiographical memory task. Results showed that participants did experience involuntary memory recall when they were recalling the past deliberately (also known as voluntary memory). This implies that involuntary memory production occurs as a product of chaining from voluntary memory—the deliberate recall of the past.

=== Priming ===
A common question in the study of involuntary memory is related to priming; what is it that activates such a memory? Various studies have been conducted in recent years to observe the conditions under which involuntary memories are primed.

Mace, in one of his recent studies, wanted to test the notion that basic cognitive activities, such as thinking about the past, may prime involuntary memories. To test this idea, Mace set up a diary method study in which participants recorded involuntary memories they experienced during a two-week period, in a diary. During this two-week period, participants also had to come into a laboratory at intervals, and were instructed to recall memories from certain life periods (e.g., high school, first five years of marriage). Following this, comparing their involuntary memories to a control condition found that a significant number of their involuntary memories related to the time period they were instructed to recall. Such findings suggest that involuntary memories may be primed by even the simplest of cognitive tasks—namely, reminiscing and recalling the past.

== Neurological basis ==
The hippocampus is important for the successful retrieval of involuntary memories.

Research studies regarding the neurological functions of involuntary memory have been few in number. Thus far, only two neuroimaging studies have been conducted comparing involuntary memories to voluntary memories using Positron Emission Tomography (PET).

The first study found that while involuntary memory retrieval is mediated by the hippocampus, a structure of the brain known to be associated with successful episodic memory retrieval, involvement of the hippocampus was independent of whether or not remembering was intentional. The researchers believe this suggests that involuntary memories may reflect the “relative automaticity” of hippocampally-mediated retrieval. However, their research mainly focuses on identifying areas and functions involved in intentional retrieval. Activity in the medial/lateral parietal and right prefrontal cortex was insensitive to depth of encoding, but rather, varied depending on the intentionality of retrieval. These areas were increasingly engaged during intentional retrieval, suggesting that one function of this region may be to align remembering to aid with current behavioral goals. This is distinct from involuntary memory, where individuals do not consciously retrieve memories that will be most helpful to their current situation; however, it remains unclear if this process is unconsciously undertaken by the brain. When dealing with involuntary word recognition tasks, activity in areas such as the left inferior frontal gyrus, left superior temporal gyrus, left hippocampus, and right superior occipital cortex have all been implicated. Yet, areas and structures that are uniquely associated with involuntary memory remain unclear and more research is needed to understand the cognitive and neurological basis of this memory phenomenon.

The second study found that the medial temporal lobe, the posterior cingulate gyrus, and the precuneus, are activated during retrieval success with or without executive control seen within the right dorsolateral prefrontal cortex. This implies that involuntary memories are successfully retrieved using the same system as voluntary memory when retrieving perceptual information. This is significant because it suggests that voluntary and involuntary retrieval are largely not mediated by separate cortical networks, which raises questions for future research of what distinguishes the two sub-components of memory, if not cognitive pathways and brain activation areas. Further, it might be explored whether these similarities in cognitive mechanism reflect shared properties and impacts of the recalled memories themselves, regardless of intentionality of retrieval. In this particular study, voluntary and involuntary recall were both associated with increased activations in the posterior cingulated gyrus, left precuneus, and right parahippocampal gyrus. In addition, right dorsolateral prefrontal cortex, and left precuneus were more active during voluntary recall, while left dorsolateral prefrontal cortex was more active during involuntary recall. It is suggested that the activation seen in left dorsolateral prefrontal cortex during involuntary memory recall reflects the attempt to prevent the recollected material from interfering with the semantic judgment task.

== Effects of age ==
=== Development ===
While age plays a role in memory capabilities, it has been found that general strategies used to encode (to remember) memories is more important. Those that are better at memorizing information are more likely to have more involuntary memories.

In younger children (ages 10 and under), it has also been found that inducing involuntary memory during testing produced significantly better results than using voluntary memory. This can be accomplished by posing a vague, mildly related question or sentence prior to the actual test question. In older children (aged 14 and above), the opposite holds, with strictly voluntary memory leading to better test results.

=== Reminiscence bump ===
The reminiscence bump is the phenomenon where in memories formed during adolescence and early adulthood are more commonly remembered than those throughout other periods in life. This is due to the formation of self-identity or the development of cognitive abilities across the lifespan. It has been found that this is true for both voluntary and involuntary memories. Age has been found to have a difference on the amount of memories recalled, but no age differences were found in the specificity of involuntary memories.

== The role of emotion ==
=== Emotion intensity ===
Emotion plays a strong role in relation to memory. It has been found that memories associated with stronger emotions (e.g.: being happy at your wedding) are more easily remembered and quickly recalled, as are those formed during moments of intense stress. The same holds true for involuntary memories, with happy involuntary memories occurring twice as often as unhappy or neutral involuntary memories.

== In clinical disorders ==
=== Posttraumatic stress disorder ===
Often people who have been the victims of some type of trauma describe vivid memories that intrude on their thoughts spontaneously and without warning. Such mental intrusions, if maintained over time compose the hallmark symptom of posttraumatic stress disorder (PTSD).

The DSM-IV defines a trauma as an event in which someone experiences, or witnesses severe injury to themselves or others or a threat to their integrity. The person must also have responded with fear, helplessness or horror at the time of the trauma. The main psychological consequences of this include re-experiencing the traumatic event (through both intrusive thoughts and images), avoidance of trauma-related stimuli, and increased arousal levels.

When it comes to involuntary memory, researchers are mainly interested in the concept of these trauma-related intrusions, which generally involved some form of re-experiencing the event, including a sensory component (e.g., imagery in any modality be it visual, auditory etc.). These intrusions, often termed "flashbacks", make the victim feel as though they are reliving the trauma, and cause high levels of emotional arousal, and the sense of an impending threat. Typically, they are parts of the traumatic event that were most salient at the time, known as "hotspots" and have the definitive feature that they cause high levels of emotional distress, and may be difficult to recall deliberately. Although this is a defining feature of PTSD, intrusive memories are also frequently encountered in anxiety-based disorders, psychotic disorders and even within the general population. Regardless of the context in which they are encountered, intrusions tend to have the same central feature; that the stored information is being recalled involuntarily. It is thought that intrusions arise when an individual encounters stimuli similar to the stimuli that were processed and stored during the trauma, thus triggering the memory into the conscious mind. A common example is one in which someone who has the victim of a car crash, upon hearing the screeching of tires experiences a flashback of their own collision, as if they are back at the original event.

=== Psychosis ===
Stressful and traumatic events, which may manifest as involuntary memories called flashbacks, may trigger a wide range of anxiety-based and psychotic disorders. Social phobia, bipolar disorder, depression, and agoraphobia, are a few examples of disorders that have influences from flashbacks.

Psychosis is defined as a range of perceptual presentations, with the associated symptoms frequently referred to as either positive or negative. Positive symptoms are delusional, and may include hallucinations, while negative symptoms are characterized by a "lack" of functioning, which may include a lack of affect (emotional feeling) and loss of motivation. One study found that there was a high prevalence of trauma in patients with severe mental illness. However, only a small percentage had been diagnosed with PTSD when displaying PTSD-like symptoms. Therefore, the more complex symptoms of psychosis may prevent the clinical detection required when diagnosing PTSD. In addition, those who have been diagnosed with PTSD and have an identified form of trauma show positive symptoms of psychosis such as delusions and/or hallucinations. Finally, it has been suggested that individuals suffering from psychosis may be more vulnerable to intrusions.
