= In Search of Lost Time =

1913–1927 novel in seven volumes by Marcel Proust

In Search of Lost Time (Remembrance of Things Past)
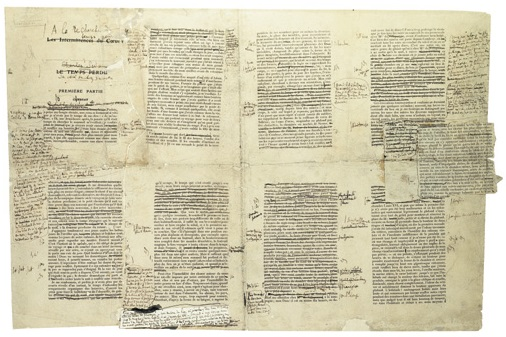
- A first galley proof of À la recherche du temps perdu: Du côté de chez Swann with Proust's handwritten corrections
- Author: Marcel Proust
- Original title: À la recherche du temps perdu
- Translators: C. K. Scott Moncrieff; Stephen Hudson; Terence Kilmartin; Lydia Davis; James Grieve
- Language: French
- Genre: Modernist
- Set in: Paris and Normandy, 1890s–1900s
- Publisher: Grasset and Gallimard
- Publication date: 1913–1927
- Publication place: France
- English publication date: 1922–1931
- Pages: 4,215
- OCLC: 6159648
- Dewey Decimal: 843.912
- LC Class: PQ2631.R63
- Translation: In Search of Lost Time (Remembrance of Things Past) at Wikisource
- Word count = 1,267,069

In Search of Lost Time (French: À la recherche du temps perdu), first translated into English as Remembrance of Things Past, and sometimes referred to in French as La Recherche (IPA: [la ʁə.ʃɛʁʃ]; lit. 'The Search'), is a novel in seven volumes by French author Marcel Proust. This early twentieth-century work is his most prominent, known for both its length and its theme of involuntary memory.

The novel gained fame in English through translations by C. K. Scott Moncrieff and Terence Kilmartin and was known in the Anglosphere as Remembrance of Things Past. The title In Search of Lost Time, a literal rendering of the French, became ascendant after D. J. Enright adopted it for his revised translation published in 1992.

In Search of Lost Time follows the narrator's recollections of childhood and experiences into adulthood in late 19th-century and early 20th-century high-society France. Proust began to shape the novel in 1909; he continued to work on it until his final illness in the autumn of 1922 forced him to break off. Proust established the structure early on, but even after volumes were initially finished, he continued to add new material and edited one volume after another for publication. The last three of the seven volumes contain oversights and fragmentary or unpolished passages, as they existed only in draft form at the time of Proust's death. His brother Robert oversaw editing and publication of these parts.

The work was published in France between 1913 and 1927. Proust paid to publish the first volume (with Éditions Grasset) after it had been turned down by leading editors who had been offered the manuscript in longhand. Many of its ideas, motifs and scenes were anticipated in Proust's unfinished novel, Jean Santeuil (1896–1899), though the perspective and treatment there are different, and in his unfinished hybrid of philosophical essay and story, Contre Sainte-Beuve (1908–09).

The novel had great influence on twentieth-century literature; some writers have sought to emulate it, others to parody it. For the centenary of the French publication of the novel's first volume, American author Edmund White pronounced In Search of Lost Time "the most respected novel of the twentieth century".

It holds the Guinness World Record for longest novel.

== Initial publication ==
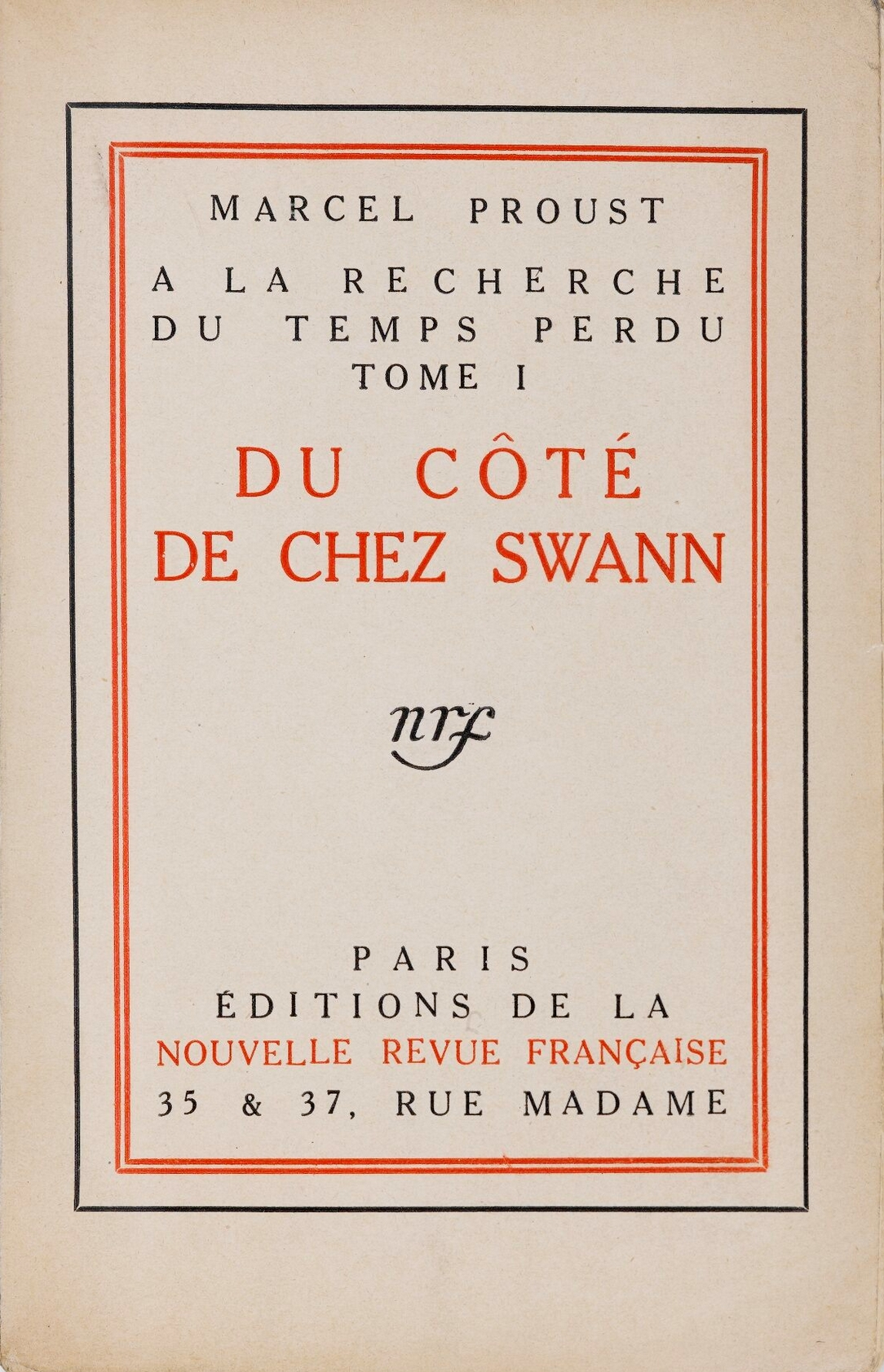
NRF edition of Du côté de chez Swann, 1917

The novel was initially published in seven volumes:

1. Swann's Way (Du côté de chez Swann, also translated as The Way by Swann's and The Swann Way), published in 1913, was rejected by a number of publishers, including Fasquelle, Ollendorff, and the Nouvelle Revue Française (NRF). André Gide was famously given the manuscript to read to advise the NRF on publication and, leafing through the seemingly endless collection of memories and philosophising or melancholic episodes, came across a few minor syntactic errors, which made him decide to turn the work down in his audit. Proust eventually arranged with the publisher Grasset to pay the cost of publication himself. When published, the book was advertised as the first of a three-volume novel (Bouillaguet and Rogers, 316–7). Du côté de chez Swann is divided into four parts: "Combray I" (sometimes referred to in English as the "Overture"), "Combray II", "Un Amour de Swann" ("Swann in Love"), and "Noms de pays: le nom" ("Names of places: the name"). A third-person novella within Du côté de chez Swann, "Un Amour de Swann" is sometimes published as a volume by itself. As it forms the self-contained story of Charles Swann's love affair with Odette de Crécy and is relatively short, it is generally considered a good introduction to the work and is often a set text in French schools. "Combray I" is similarly excerpted; it ends with the famous madeleine cake episode, introducing the theme of involuntary memory. In early 1914 Gide, who had been involved in the NRF's rejection of the book, wrote to Proust to apologise and to offer congratulations on the novel:
  For several days I have been unable to put your book down ... The rejection of this book will remain the most serious mistake ever made by the NRF and, since I bear the shame of being very much responsible for it, one of the most stinging and remorseful regrets of my life (Tadié, 611).
  Gallimard (the publishing arm of the NRF) offered to publish the remaining volumes, but Proust chose to stay with Grasset.
2. In the Shadow of Young Girls in Flower (À l'ombre des jeunes filles en fleurs, also translated as Within a Budding Grove or In the Shadow of Girls in Blossom), published on 30 November 1918, was scheduled to be published in 1914 but was delayed by the onset of World War I. At the same time, Grasset's firm was closed down when the publisher went into military service. This freed Proust to move to Gallimard, where all of the subsequent volumes were published. Meanwhile, the novel kept growing in length and in conception. When published, this volume was awarded the Prix Goncourt in 1919.
3. The Guermantes Way (Le Côté de Guermantes) was published in 1920 and 1921 and was originally split into two volumes as Le Côté de Guermantes I and Le Côté de Guermantes II.
4. Sodom and Gomorrah (Sodome et Gomorrhe, sometimes translated as Cities of the Plain) was spread across two volumes. The first forty pages initially appeared as Sodome et Gomorrhe I at the end of Le Côté de Guermantes II in 1921 (Bouillaguet and Rogers, 942), while the remainder appeared as Sodome et Gomorrhe II in 1922. This was the last volume over which Proust supervised publication before his death in November 1922. The publication of the remaining volumes was carried out by his brother, Robert Proust, and Jacques Rivière.
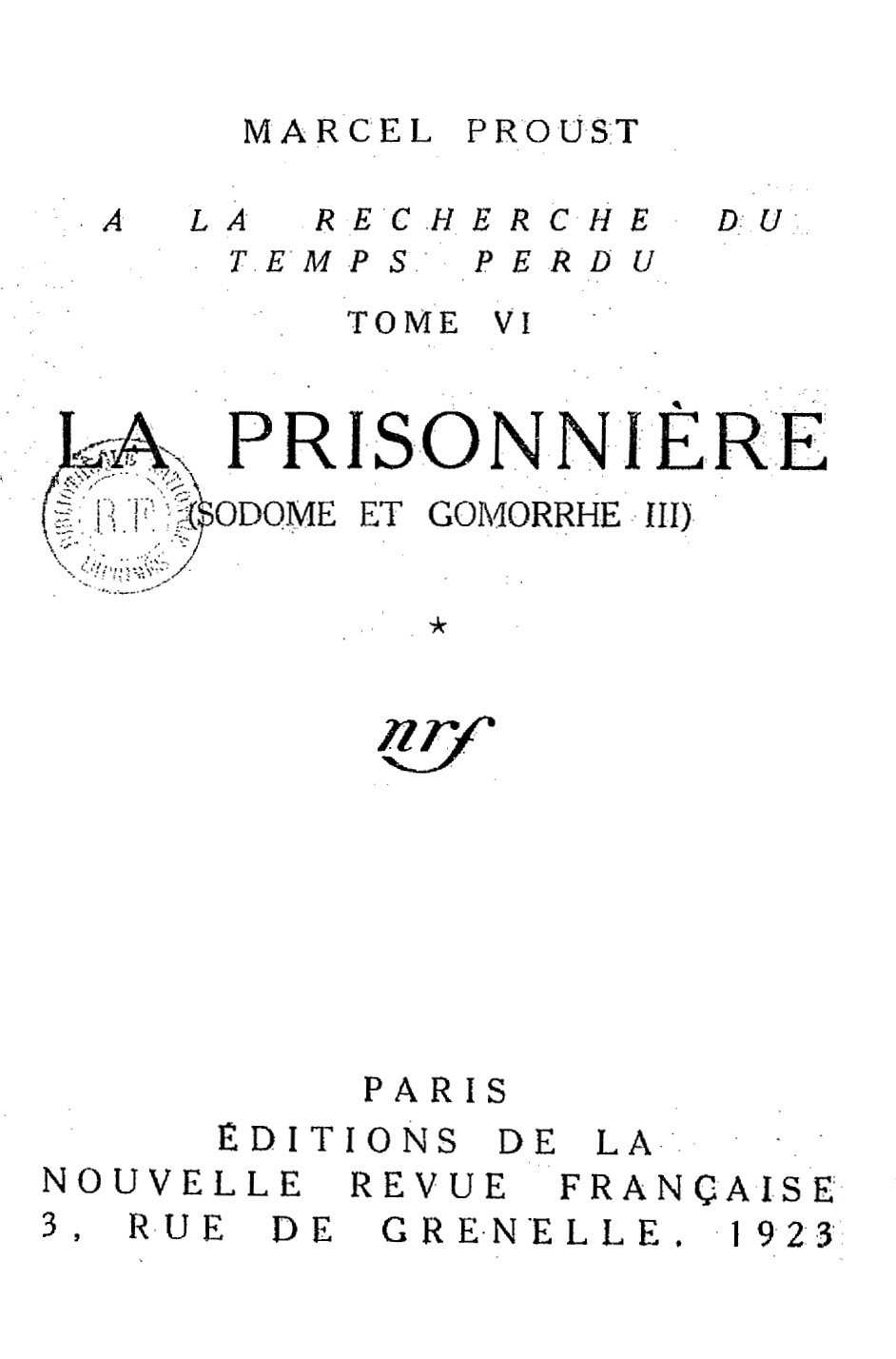
  1923 edition of La Prisonnière. It is labelled as "Tome VI" as Sodom et Gomorrhe was originally published in two volumes.
5. The Prisoner (La Prisonnière, also translated as The Captive), published in 1923, is the first volume of the section within In Search of Lost Time known as "le Roman d'Albertine" ("the Albertine novel"). The name "Albertine" first appears in Proust's notebooks in 1913. The material in volumes 5 and 6 were developed during the hiatus between the publication of volumes 1 and 2 and they are a departure of the original three-volume series originally planned by Proust. This is the first of Proust's books published posthumously. Early editions describe La Prisonnière as the third volume of Sodome et Gomorrhe.
6. The Fugitive (Albertine disparue, also titled La Fugitive, sometimes translated as The Sweet Cheat Gone [the last line of Walter de la Mare's poem "The Ghost"] or Albertine Gone), published in 1925, is the second and final volume in "le Roman d'Albertine" and the second volume published after Proust's death. It is the most editorially vexed volume. As noted, the final three volumes of the novel were published posthumously, and without Proust's final corrections and revisions. The first edition, based on Proust's manuscript, was published as Albertine disparue to prevent it from being confused with Rabindranath Tagore's La Fugitive, first published in 1921. The first authoritative "La Pléiade" edition of the novel in French (1954), also based on Proust's manuscript, used the title La Fugitive. The second "La Pléiade" French edition (1987–1989), uses the title Albertine disparue and is based on an unmarked typescript acquired in 1962 by the Bibliothèque Nationale. To complicate matters, after the death in 1986 of Proust's niece, Suzy Mante-Proust, her son-in-law discovered among her papers a typescript that had been corrected and annotated by Proust. The late changes Proust made include a small, crucial detail and the deletion of approximately 150 pages. This version was published as Albertine disparue in France in 1987.
7. Finding Time Again (Le Temps retrouvé, also translated as Time Regained and The Past Recaptured), published in 1927, is the final volume in Proust's novel. Much of the final volume was written at the same time as Swann's Way, but was revised and expanded during the course of the novel's publication to account for, to a greater or lesser success, the then unforeseen material now contained in the middle volumes (Terdiman, 153n3). This volume includes a noteworthy episode describing Paris during the First World War.

== Synopsis ==
The novel recounts the experiences of the Narrator (who is never definitively named) while he is growing up, learning about art, participating in society, and falling in love.

An approximate timeline of the novel was deduced by literary theorist Gérard Genette in his 1980 book Narrative Discourse: An Essay in Method.

- The narrator's birth: 1878
- Volume I: Swann's Way – 1883–1893 (with "Swann in Love" taking place in 1877–1878)
- Volume II: In the Shadow of Young Girls in Flower – 1893–1897
- Volume III: The Guermantes Way – 1897–1899
- Volume IV: Sodom and Gomorrah – 1899–1900
- Volume V: The Prisoner – 1900–1902
- Volume VI: The Fugitive – 1902–1903
- Volume VII: Time Regained – 1903–1925

=== Volume One: Swann's Way ===
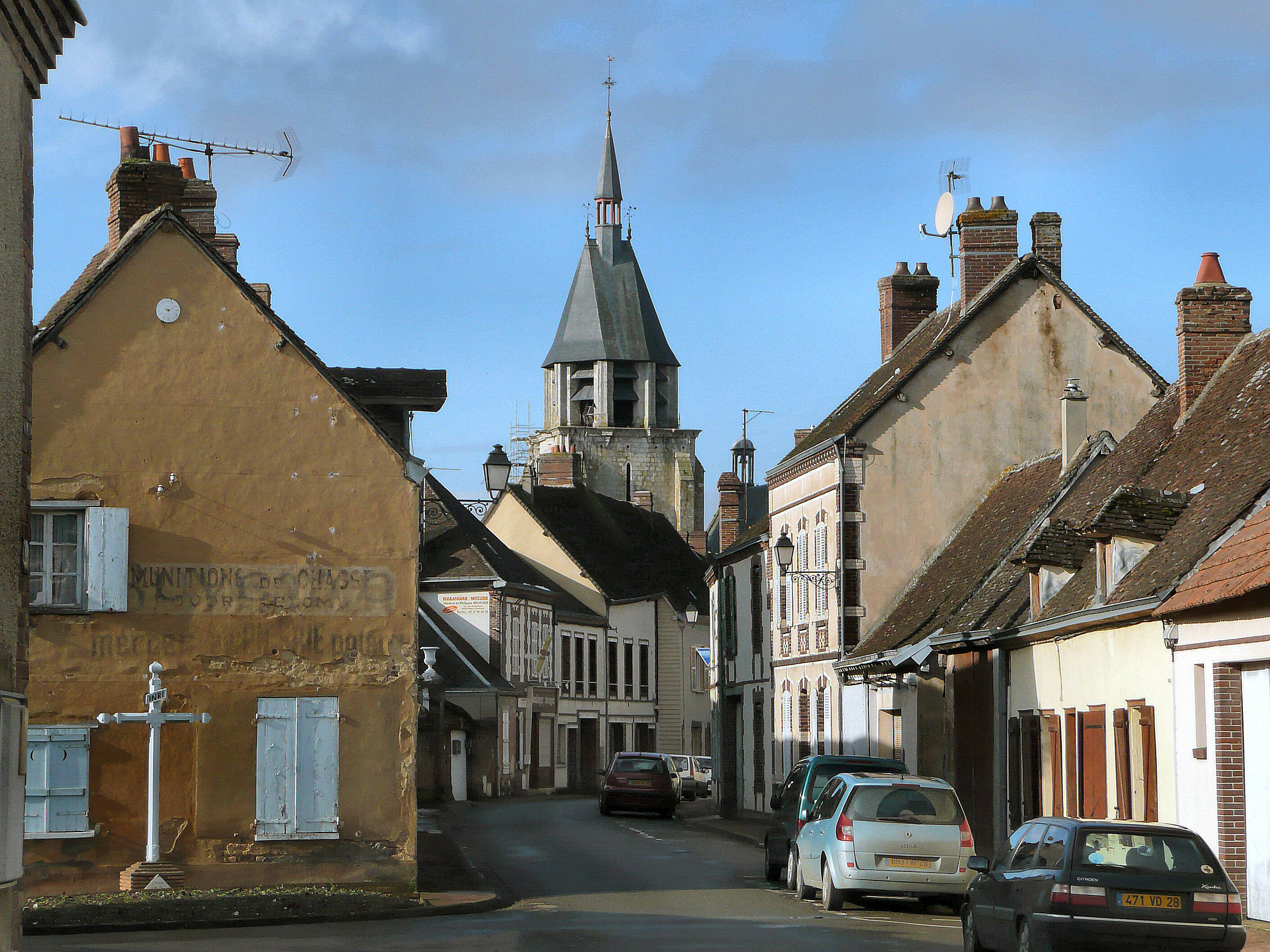
Illiers, the country town overlooked by a church steeple where Proust spent time as a child and which he described as "Combray" in the novel. The town adopted the name Illiers-Combray in homage.

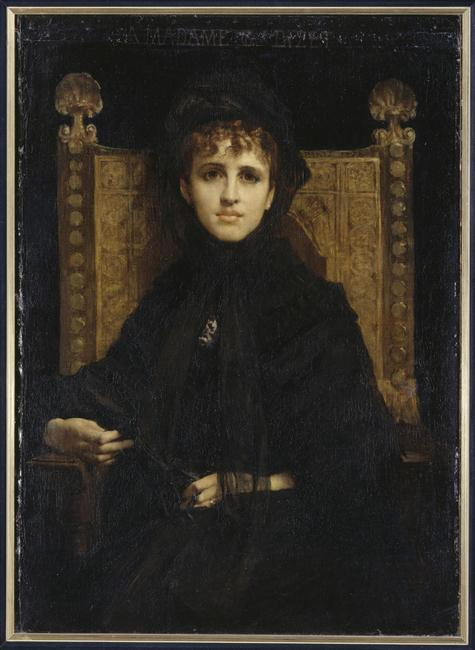
Portrait of Mme. Geneviève Bizet, née Geneviève Halévy, by Jules-Élie Delaunay, in Musée d'Orsay (1878). She served as partial inspiration for the character of Oriane de Guermantes.

The Narrator begins by noting, "For a long time, I went to bed early." He comments on the way in which sleep seems to alter one's surroundings, and the way habit makes one indifferent to them. He remembers being in his room in the family's country home in Combray, while downstairs his parents entertain their friend Charles Swann, an elegant man of Jewish origin with strong ties to society. Due to Swann's visit, the Narrator is deprived of his mother's goodnight kiss, but he gets her to spend the night reading to him. This memory is the only one he has of Combray until years later the taste of a madeleine cake dipped in tea inspires a nostalgic incident of involuntary memory. He remembers having a similar snack as a child with his invalid aunt Léonie, and it leads to more memories of Combray. He describes their servant Françoise, who is uneducated but possesses an earthy wisdom and a strong sense of both duty and tradition. He meets an elegant "lady in pink" while visiting his uncle Adolphe. He develops a love of the theater, especially the actress la Berma, and his awkward Jewish friend Bloch introduces him to the works of the writer Bergotte. He learns Swann made an unsuitable marriage but has social ambitions for his beautiful daughter Gilberte. Legrandin, a snobbish friend of the family, tries to avoid introducing the boy to his well-to-do sister. The Narrator describes two routes for country walks the child and his parents often enjoyed: the way past Swann's home (the Méséglise way), and the Guermantes way, both containing scenes of natural beauty. Taking the Méséglise way, he sees Gilberte Swann standing in her yard with a lady in white, Mme. Swann, and her supposed lover: Baron de Charlus, a friend of Swann's. Gilberte makes a gesture that the Narrator interprets as a rude dismissal. During another walk, he spies a lesbian scene involving Mlle. Vinteuil, daughter of a composer, and her friend. The Guermantes way is symbolic of the Guermantes family, the nobility of the area. The Narrator is awed by the magic of their name and is captivated when he first sees Mme. de Guermantes. He discovers how appearances conceal the true nature of things and tries writing a description of some nearby steeples. Lying in bed, he seems transported back to these places until he awakens.

Mme. Verdurin is a very rich and autocratic hostess who, aided by her husband, demands total obedience from the guests in her "little clan". One guest is Odette de Crécy, a former courtesan, who has met Swann and invites him to the group. Swann is too refined for such company, but Odette gradually intrigues him with her unusual style. A sonata by Vinteuil, which features a "little phrase", becomes the motif for their deepening relationship. The Verdurins host M. de Forcheville; their guests include Cottard, a doctor; Brichot, an academic; Saniette, the object of scorn; and a painter, M. Biche. Swann grows jealous of Odette, who now keeps him at arm's length, and suspects an affair between her and Forcheville, aided by the Verdurins. Swann seeks respite by attending a society concert that includes Legrandin's sister and a young Mme. de Guermantes; the "little phrase" is played and Swann realizes Odette's love for him is gone. He tortures himself wondering about her true relationships with others, but his love for her, despite renewals, gradually diminishes. He moves on and marvels that he ever loved a woman who was not his type.

At home in Paris, the Narrator dreams of visiting Venice or the church in Balbec, a resort, but he is too unwell and instead takes walks in the Champs-Élysées. There he meets and befriends Gilberte. He holds her father, now married to Odette, in the highest esteem, and is awed by the beautiful sight of Mme. Swann strolling in public. Years later, the old sights of the area are long gone, and he laments the fleeting nature of places.

=== Volume Two: Within a Budding Grove ===
The Narrator's parents invite M. de Norpois, a diplomat colleague of the Narrator's father, to dinner. With Norpois's intervention, the Narrator is finally allowed to go and see the Berma perform in a play, but is disappointed by her acting. Afterwards, at dinner, he watches Norpois, who is extremely diplomatic and correct at all times, expound on society and art. The Narrator gives him a draft of his writing, but Norpois gently indicates it is not good. The Narrator continues to go to the Champs-Élysées and play with Gilberte. Her parents distrust him, so he writes to them in protest. He and Gilberte wrestle and he has an orgasm. Gilberte invites him to tea, and he becomes a regular at her house. He observes Mme. Swann's inferior social status, Swann's lowered standards and indifference towards his wife, and Gilberte's affection for her father. The Narrator contemplates how he has attained his wish to know the Swanns, and savors their unique style. At one of their parties he meets and befriends Bergotte, who gives his impressions of society figures and artists. But the Narrator is still unable to start writing seriously. His friend Bloch takes him to a brothel, where there is a Jewish prostitute named Rachel. He showers Mme. Swann with flowers, being almost on better terms with her than with Gilberte. One day, he and Gilberte quarrel and he decides never to see her again. However, he continues to visit Mme. Swann, who has become a popular hostess, with her guests including Mme. Bontemps, who has a niece named Albertine. The Narrator hopes for a letter from Gilberte repairing their friendship, but gradually feels himself losing interest. He breaks down and plans to reconcile with her, but spies from afar someone resembling her walking with a boy and gives her up for good. He stops visiting her mother also, who is now a celebrated beauty admired by passersby, and years later he can recall the glamour she displayed then.

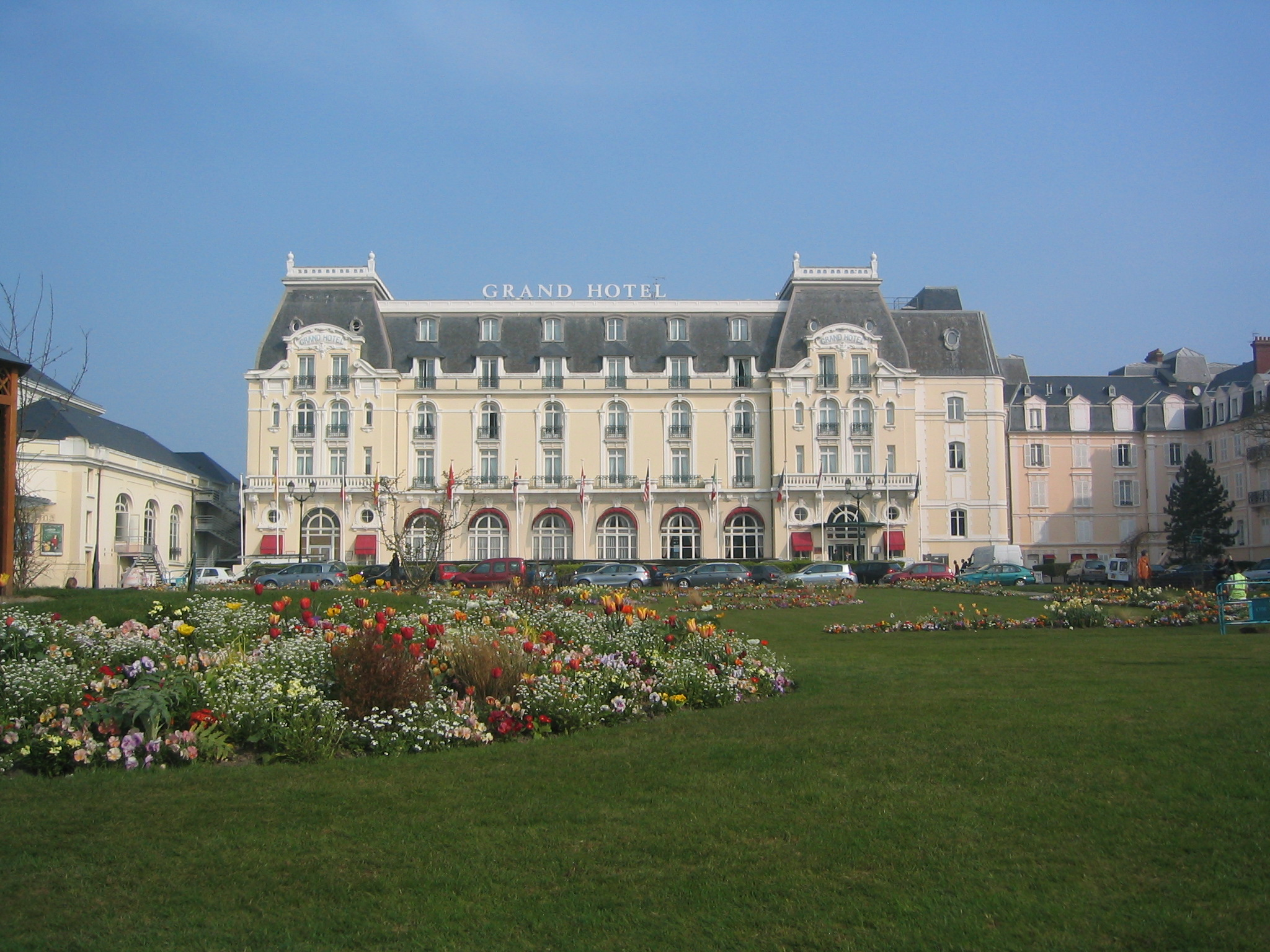
Grand Hotel of Cabourg, where Proust often vacationed and wrote parts of his novel, is the model for Balbec.

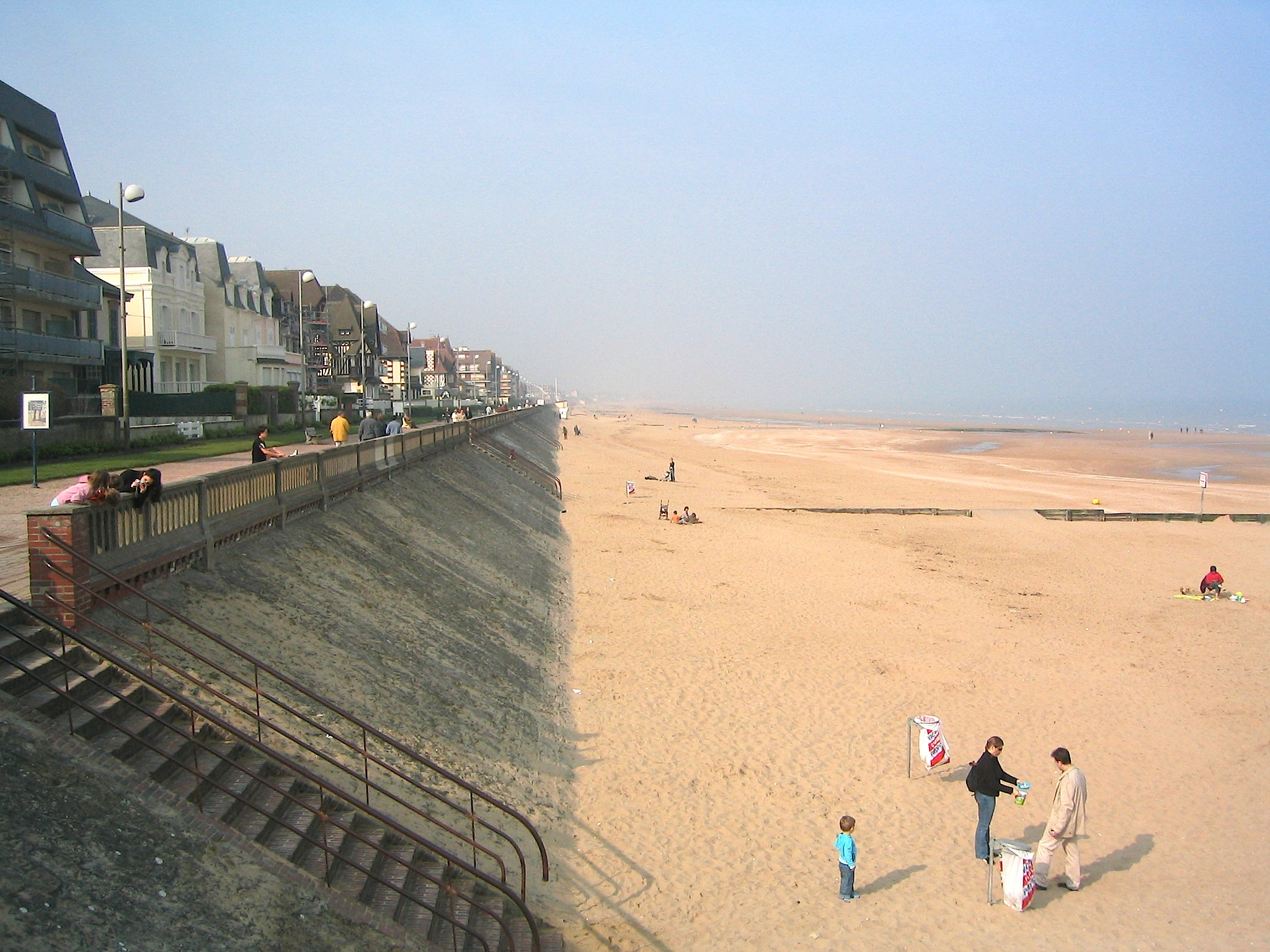
The beach at Cabourg

Two years later, the Narrator, his grandmother, and Françoise set out for the seaside town of Balbec. The Narrator is almost totally indifferent to Gilberte now. During the train ride, his grandmother, who only believes in proper books, lends him her favorite: the Letters of Mme. de Sévigné. At Balbec, the Narrator is disappointed with the church and uncomfortable in his unfamiliar hotel room, but his grandmother comforts him. He admires the seascape, and learns about the colorful staff and customers around the hotel: Aimé, the discreet headwaiter; the lift operator; M. de Stermaria and his beautiful young daughter; and M. de Cambremer and his wife, Legrandin's sister. His grandmother encounters an old friend, the blue-blooded Mme. de Villeparisis, and they renew their friendship. The three of them go for rides in the country, openly discussing art and politics. The Narrator longs for the country girls he sees alongside the roads, and has a strange feeling—possibly memory, possibly something else—while admiring a row of three trees. Mme. de Villeparisis is joined by her glamorous great-nephew Robert de Saint-Loup, who is involved with an unsuitable woman. Despite initial awkwardness, the Narrator and his grandmother become good friends with him. Bloch, the childhood friend from Combray, turns up with his family, and acts in typically inappropriate fashion. Saint-Loup's ultra-aristocratic and extremely rude uncle the Baron de Charlus arrives. The Narrator discovers Mme. de Villeparisis, her nephew M. de Charlus, and his nephew Saint-Loup are all of the Guermantes family. Charlus ignores the Narrator, but later visits him in his room and lends him a book. The next day, the Baron speaks shockingly informally to him, then demands the book back. The Narrator ponders Saint-Loup's attitude towards his aristocratic roots, and his relationship with his mistress, a mere actress whose recital bombed horribly with his family. One day, the Narrator sees a "little band" of teenage girls strolling beside the sea, and becomes infatuated with them, along with an unseen hotel guest named Mlle. Simonet. He joins Saint-Loup for dinner and reflects on how drunkenness affects his perceptions. Later they meet the painter Elstir, and the Narrator visits his studio. The Narrator marvels at Elstir's method of renewing impressions of ordinary things, as well as his connections with the Verdurins (he is "M. Biche") and Mme. Swann. He discovers the painter knows the teenage girls, particularly one dark-haired beauty who is Albertine Simonet. Elstir arranges an introduction, and the Narrator becomes friends with her, as well as her friends Andrée, Rosemonde, and Gisèle. The group goes for picnics and tours the countryside, as well as playing games, while the Narrator reflects on the nature of love as he becomes attracted to Albertine. Despite her rejection, they become close, although he still feels attracted to the whole group. At summer's end, the town closes up, and the Narrator is left with his image of first seeing the girls walking beside the sea.

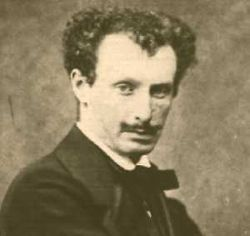
Charles Haas (1832–1902), Charles Swann

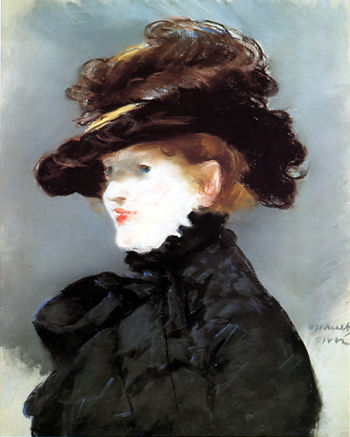
Méry Laurent (by Édouard Manet, 1882), Odette de Crécy (later Madame Swann)

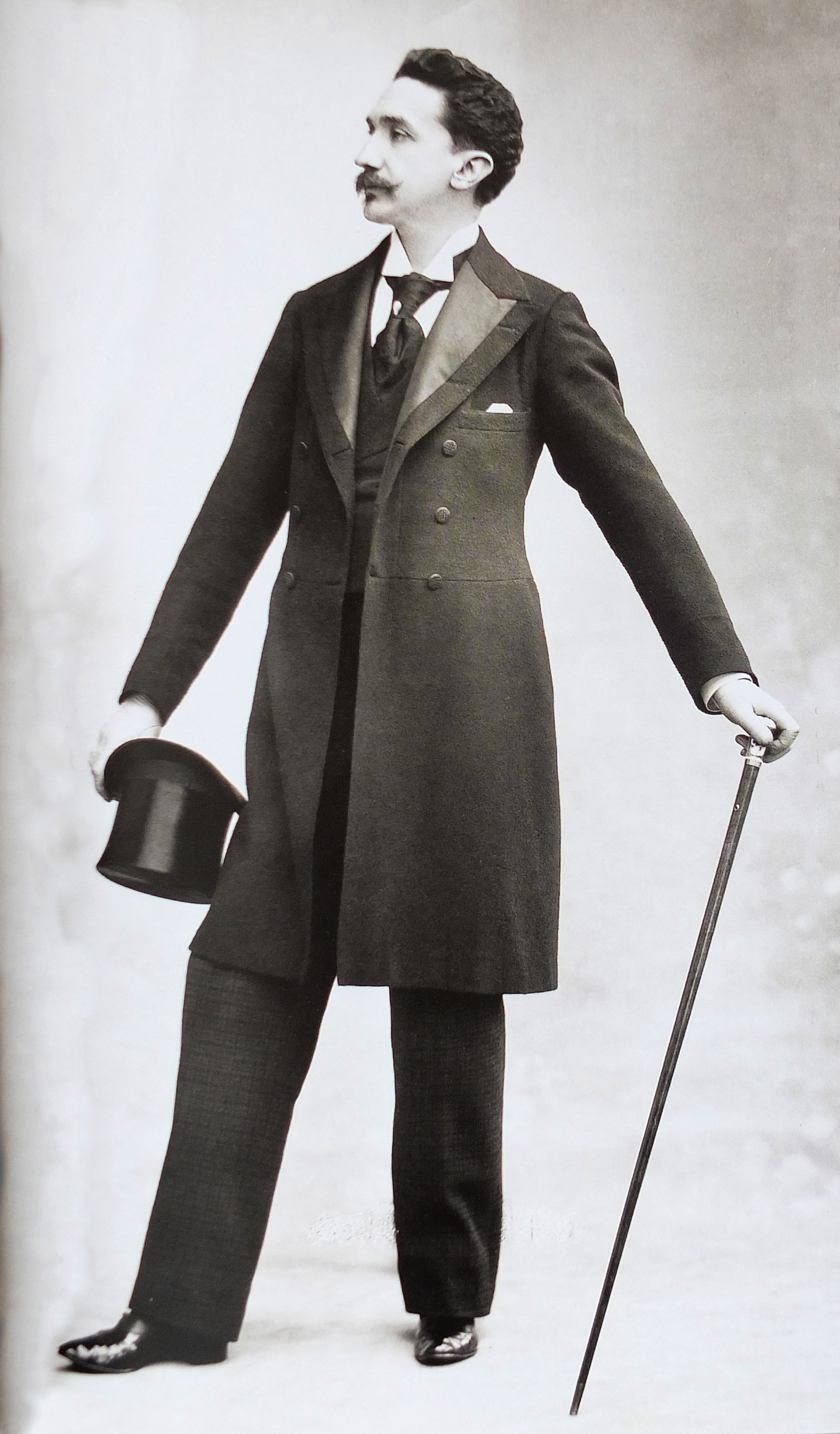
Robert de Montesquiou (by Paul Nadar, 1895), Baron Charlus

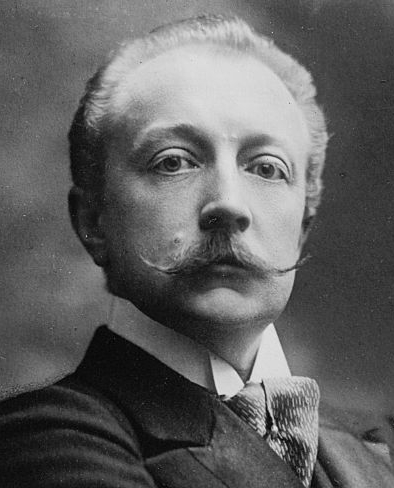
Boni de Castellane (1867–1932), Marquis de Saint-Loup

=== Volume Three: The Guermantes Way ===
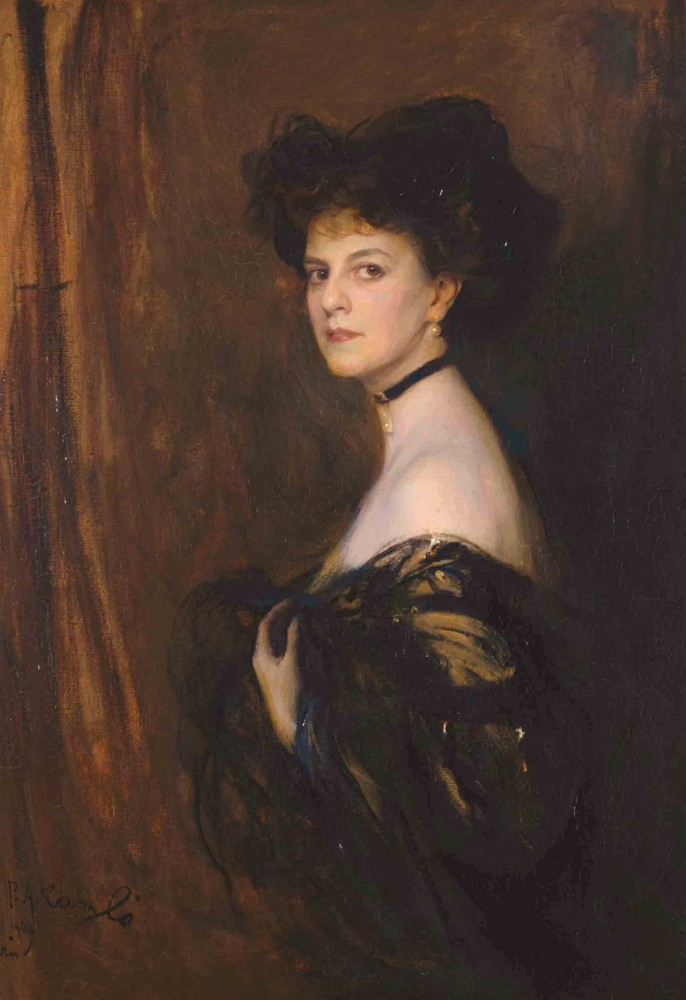
Élisabeth, Countess Greffulhe (1905), by Philip de László, who served as the model for the character of the Duchesse de Guermantes

The Narrator's family has moved to an apartment connected with the Guermantes residence. Françoise befriends a fellow tenant, the tailor Jupien and his niece. The Narrator is fascinated by the Guermantes and their life, and is awed by their social circle while attending another Berma performance. He begins staking out the street where Mme. de Guermantes walks every day, to her evident annoyance. He decides to visit her nephew Saint-Loup at his military base, to ask to be introduced to her. After noting the landscape and his state of mind while sleeping, the Narrator meets and attends dinners with Saint-Loup's fellow officers, where they discuss the Dreyfus Affair and the art of military strategy. But the Narrator returns home after receiving a call from his aging grandmother. Mme. de Guermantes declines to see him, and he also finds he is still unable to begin writing. Saint-Loup visits on leave, and they have lunch and attend a recital with his actress mistress: Rachel, the Jewish prostitute, toward whom the unsuspecting Saint-Loup is crazed with jealousy. The Narrator then goes to Mme. de Villeparisis's salon, which is considered second-rate despite its public reputation. Legrandin attends and displays his social climbing. Bloch stridently interrogates M. de Norpois about the Dreyfus Affair, which has ripped all of society asunder, but Norpois diplomatically avoids answering. The Narrator observes Mme. de Guermantes and her aristocratic bearing, as she makes caustic remarks about friends and family, including the mistresses of her husband, who is M. de Charlus's brother. Mme. Swann arrives, and the Narrator remembers a visit from Morel, the son of his uncle Adolphe's valet, who revealed that the "lady in pink" was Mme. Swann. Charlus asks the Narrator to leave with him, and offers to make him his protégé. At home, the Narrator's grandmother has worsened, and while walking with him she suffers a stroke.

The family seeks out the best medical help, and she is often visited by Bergotte, himself unwell, but she dies, her face reverting to its youthful appearance. Several months later, Saint-Loup, now single, convinces the Narrator to ask out the Stermaria daughter, newly divorced. Albertine visits; she has matured and they share a kiss. The Narrator then goes to see Mme. de Villeparisis, where Mme. de Guermantes, whom he has stopped following, invites him to dinner. The Narrator daydreams of Mme. de Stermaria, but she abruptly cancels, although Saint-Loup rescues him from despair by taking him to dine with his aristocratic friends, who engage in petty gossip. Saint-Loup passes on an invitation from Charlus to come visit him. The next day, at the Guermantes's dinner party, the Narrator admires their Elstir paintings, then meets the cream of society, including the Princess of Parma, who is an amiable simpleton. He learns more about the Guermantes: their hereditary features; their less-refined cousins the Courvoisiers; and Mme. de Guermantes's celebrated humor, artistic tastes, and exalted diction (although she does not live up to the enchantment of her name). The discussion turns to gossip about society, including Charlus and his late wife; the affair between Norpois and Mme. de Villeparisis; and aristocratic lineages. Leaving, the Narrator visits Charlus, who falsely accuses him of slandering him. The Narrator stomps on Charlus's hat and storms out, but Charlus is strangely unperturbed and gives him a ride home. Months later, the Narrator is invited to the Princesse de Guermantes's party. He tries to verify the invitation with M. and Mme. de Guermantes, but first sees something he will describe later. They will be attending the party but do not help him, and while they are chatting, Swann arrives. Now a committed Dreyfusard, he is very sick and nearing death, but the Guermantes assure him he will outlive them.

=== Volume Four: Sodom and Gomorrah ===
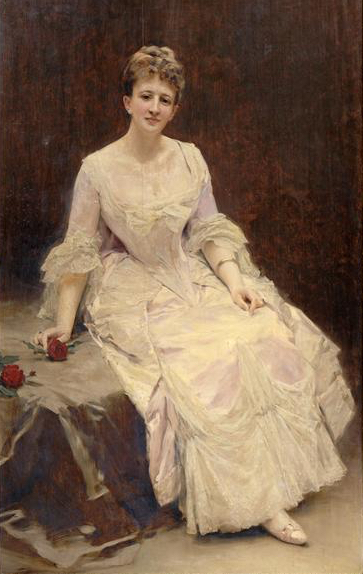
French society belle Louise Ward, Marquise d'Hervey de Saint-Denys, was Proust's model for the Princesse d’Orvillers, who later in the series is called the Princesse de Nassau.

The Narrator describes what he had seen earlier: while waiting for the Guermantes to return so he could ask about his invitation, he saw Charlus encounter Jupien in their courtyard. The two then went into Jupien's shop and had intercourse. The Narrator reflects on the nature of "inverts", and how they are like a secret society, never able to live in the open. He compares them to flowers, whose reproduction through the aid of insects depends solely on happenstance. Arriving at the Princesse's party, his invitation seems valid as he is greeted warmly by her. He sees Charlus exchanging knowing looks with the diplomat Vaugoubert, a fellow invert. After several tries, the Narrator manages to be introduced to the Prince de Guermantes, who then walks off with Swann, causing speculation on the topic of their conversation. Mme. de Saint-Euverte tries to recruit guests for her party the next day, but is subjected to scorn from some of the Guermantes. Charlus is captivated by the two young sons of M. de Guermantes's newest mistress. Saint-Loup arrives and mentions the names of several promiscuous women to the Narrator. Swann takes the Narrator aside and reveals the Prince wanted to admit his and his wife's pro-Dreyfus leanings. Swann is aware of his old friend Charlus's behavior, then urges the Narrator to visit Gilberte, and departs. The Narrator leaves with M. and Mme. de Guermantes, and heads home for a late-night meeting with Albertine. He grows frantic when first she is late and then calls to cancel, but he convinces her to come. He writes an indifferent letter to Gilberte, and reviews the changing social scene, which now includes Mme. Swann's salon centered on Bergotte.

He decides to return to Balbec, after learning the women mentioned by Saint-Loup will be there. At Balbec, grief at his grandmother's suffering, which was worse than he knew, overwhelms him. He ponders the intermittencies of the heart and the ways of dealing with sad memories. His mother, even sadder, has become more like his grandmother in homage. Albertine is nearby and they begin spending time together, but he starts to suspect her of lesbianism and of lying to him about her activities. He fakes a preference for her friend Andrée to make her become more trustworthy, and it works, but he soon suspects her of knowing several scandalous women at the hotel, including Léa, an actress. On the way to visit Saint-Loup, they meet Morel, the valet's son who is now an excellent violinist, and then the aging Charlus, who falsely claims to know Morel and goes to speak to him. The Narrator visits the Verdurins, who are renting a house from the Cambremers. On the train with him is the little clan: Brichot, who explains at length the derivation of the local place-names; Cottard, now a celebrated doctor; Saniette, still the butt of everyone's ridicule; and a new member, Ski. The Verdurins are still haughty and dictatorial toward their guests, who are as pedantic as ever. Charlus and Morel arrive together, and Charlus's true nature is an open secret. The Cambremers arrive, and the Verdurins barely tolerate them.

Back at the hotel, the Narrator ruminates on sleep and time, and observes the amusing mannerisms of the staff, who are mostly aware of Charlus's proclivities. The Narrator and Albertine hire a chauffeur and take rides in the country, leading to observations about new forms of travel as well as country life. The Narrator is unaware that the chauffeur and Morel are acquainted, and he reviews Morel's amoral character and plans towards Jupien's niece. The Narrator is jealously suspicious of Albertine but grows tired of her. She and the Narrator attend evening dinners at the Verdurins, taking the train with the other guests; Charlus is now a regular, despite his obliviousness to the clan's mockery. He and Morel try to maintain the secret of their relationship, and the Narrator recounts a ploy involving a fake duel that Charlus used to control Morel. The passing station stops remind the Narrator of various people and incidents, including two failed attempts by the Prince de Guermantes to arrange liaisons with Morel; a final break between the Verdurins and Cambremers; and a misunderstanding between the Narrator, Charlus, and Bloch. The Narrator has grown weary of the area and prefers others over Albertine, but she reveals to him as they leave the train that she has plans with Mlle. Vinteuil and her friend (the lesbians from Combray), which plunges him into despair. He invents a story about a broken engagement of his, to convince her to go to Paris with him, and after hesitating she suddenly agrees to go immediately. The Narrator tells his mother: he must marry Albertine.

=== Volume Five: The Prisoner ===
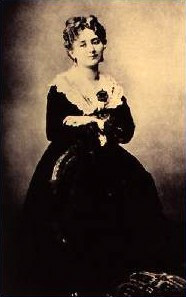
Léontine Lippmann (1844–1910), better known by her married name of Madame Arman or Madame Arman de Caillavet, was the model for Proust's Madame Verdurin.

The Narrator is living with Albertine in his family's apartment, to Françoise's distrust and his absent mother's chagrin. He marvels that he has come to possess her, but has grown bored with her. He mostly stays home, but has enlisted Andrée to report on Albertine's whereabouts, as his jealousy remains. The Narrator gets advice on fashion from Mme. de Guermantes, and encounters Charlus and Morel visiting Jupien and his niece, who is being married off to Morel despite his cruelty towards her. One day, the Narrator returns from the Guermantes and finds Andrée just leaving, claiming to dislike the smell of their flowers. Albertine, who is more guarded to avoid provoking his jealousy, is maturing into an intelligent and elegant young lady. The Narrator is entranced by her beauty as she sleeps, and is only content when she is not out with others. She mentions wanting to go to the Verdurins, but the Narrator suspects an ulterior motive and analyzes her conversation for hints. He suggests she go instead to the Trocadéro with Andrée, and she reluctantly agrees. The Narrator compares dreams to wakefulness, and listens to the street vendors with Albertine, then she departs. He remembers trips she took with the chauffeur, then learns Léa the notorious actress will be at the Trocadero too. He sends Françoise to retrieve Albertine, and while waiting, he muses on music and Morel. When she returns, they go for a drive, while he pines for Venice and realizes she feels captive. He learns of Bergotte's final illness. That evening, he sneaks off to the Verdurins to try to discover the reason for Albertine's interest in them. He encounters Brichot on the way, and they discuss Swann, who has died. Charlus arrives and the Narrator reviews the Baron's struggles with Morel, then learns Mlle. Vinteuil and her friend are expected (although they do not come). Morel joins in performing a septet by Vinteuil, which evokes commonalities with his sonata that only the composer could create. Mme. Verdurin is furious that Charlus has taken control of her party; in revenge the Verdurins persuade Morel to repudiate him, and Charlus falls temporarily ill from the shock. Returning home, the Narrator and Albertine fight about his solo visit to the Verdurins, and she denies having affairs with Léa or Mlle. Vinteuil, but admits she lied on occasion to avoid arguments. He threatens to break it off, but they reconcile. He appreciates art and fashion with her, and ponders her mysteriousness. But his suspicion of her and Andrée is renewed, and they quarrel. After two awkward days and a restless night, he resolves to end the affair, but in the morning Françoise informs him: Albertine has asked for her boxes and left.

=== Volume Six: The Fugitive ===
The Narrator is anguished at Albertine's departure and absence. He dispatches Saint-Loup to convince her aunt Mme. Bontemps to send her back, but Albertine insists the Narrator should ask, and she will gladly return. The Narrator lies and replies he is done with her, but she just agrees with him. He writes to her that he will marry Andrée, then hears from Saint-Loup of the failure of his mission to the aunt. Desperate, he begs Albertine to return, but receives word: she has died in a riding accident. He receives two last letters from her: one wishing him and Andrée well, and one asking if she can return. The Narrator plunges into suffering amid the many different memories of Albertine, intimately linked to all of his everyday sensations. He recalls a suspicious incident she told him of at Balbec, and asks Aimé, the headwaiter, to investigate. He recalls their history together and his regrets, as well as love's randomness. Aimé reports back: Albertine often engaged in affairs with girls at Balbec. The Narrator sends him to learn more, and he reports other liaisons with girls. The Narrator wishes he could have known the true Albertine, whom he would have accepted. He begins to grow accustomed to the idea of her death, despite constant reminders that renew his grief. Andrée admits her own lesbianism but denies being with Albertine. The Narrator knows he will forget Albertine, just as he has forgotten Gilberte.

He happens to meet Gilberte again; her mother Mme. Swann became Mme. de Forcheville and Gilberte is now part of high society, received by the Guermantes. The Narrator publishes an article in Le Figaro. Andrée visits him and confesses her relations with Albertine. She also explains the truth behind Albertine's departure: her aunt wanted her to marry another man. The Narrator and his mother visit Venice, which enthralls him. They happen to see Norpois and Mme. de Villeparisis there. A telegram signed from Albertine arrives, but the Narrator is indifferent. Returning home, the Narrator and his mother receive surprising news: Gilberte will marry Saint-Loup, and Jupien's niece will be adopted by Charlus and then married to Legrandin's nephew, an invert. There is much discussion of these marriages among society. The Narrator visits Gilberte in her new home where he also realizes that the telegram was from her, not Albertine, who is not alive, and is shocked to learn of Saint-Loup's affair with Morel, among others. He despairs for their friendship.

=== Volume Seven: Time Regained ===
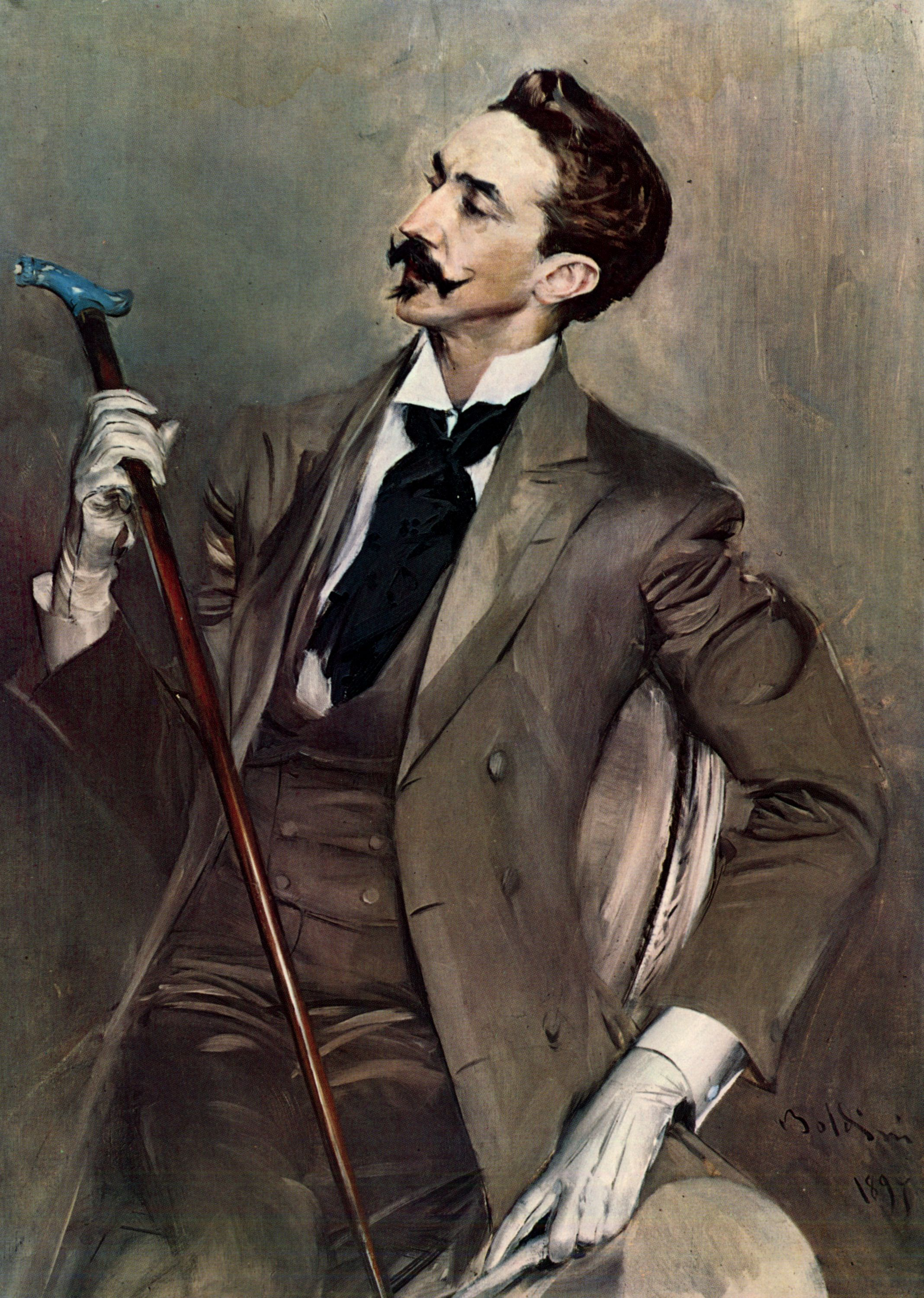
Robert de Montesquiou, the main inspiration for Baron de Charlus in À la recherche du temps perdu

The Narrator is staying with Gilberte at her home near Combray. They go for walks, on one of which he is stunned to learn the Méséglise way and the Guermantes way are actually linked. Gilberte also tells him she was attracted to him when young, and had made a suggestive gesture to him as he watched her. Also, it was Léa she was walking with the evening he had planned to reconcile with her. He considers Saint-Loup's nature and reads an account of the Verdurins' salon, deciding he has no talent for writing.

The scene shifts to a night in 1916, during World War I, when the Narrator has returned to Paris from a stay in a sanatorium and is walking the streets during a blackout. He reflects on the changed norms of art and society, with the Verdurins now highly esteemed. He recounts a 1914 visit from Saint-Loup, who was trying to enlist secretly. He recalls descriptions of the fighting he subsequently received from Saint-Loup and Gilberte, whose home was threatened. He describes a call paid on him a few days previously by Saint-Loup; they discussed military strategy. Now on the dark street, the Narrator encounters Charlus, who has completely surrendered to his impulses. Charlus reviews Morel's betrayals and his own temptation to seek vengeance; critiques Brichot's new fame as a writer, which has ostracized him from the Verdurins; and admits his general sympathy with Germany. The last part of the conversation draws a crowd of suspicious onlookers. After parting the Narrator seeks refuge in what appears to be a hotel, where he sees someone who looks familiar leaving. Inside, he discovers it to be a male brothel, and spies Charlus using the services. The proprietor turns out to be Jupien, who expresses a perverse pride in his business. A few days later, news comes that Saint-Loup has been killed in combat. The Narrator pieces together that Saint-Loup had visited Jupien's brothel, and ponders what might have been had he lived.

Years later, again in Paris, the Narrator goes to a party at the house of the Prince de Guermantes. On the way he sees Charlus, now a mere shell of his former self, being helped by Jupien. The paving stones at the Guermantes house inspire another incident of involuntary memory for the Narrator, quickly followed by two more. Inside, while waiting in the library, he discerns their meaning: by putting him in contact with both the past and present, the impressions allow him to gain a vantage point outside time, affording a glimpse of the true nature of things. He realizes his whole life has prepared him for the mission of describing events as fully revealed, and (finally) resolves to begin writing. Entering the party, he is shocked at the disguises old age has given to the people he knew, and at the changes in society. Legrandin is now an invert, but is no longer a snob. Bloch is a respected writer and vital figure in society. Morel has reformed and become a respected citizen. Mme. de Forcheville is the mistress of M. de Guermantes. Mme. Verdurin has married the Prince de Guermantes after both their spouses died. Rachel is the star of the party, abetted by Mme. de Guermantes, whose social position has been eroded by her affinity for theater. Gilberte introduces her daughter to the Narrator; he is struck by the way the daughter encapsulates both the Méséglise and Guermantes ways within herself. He is spurred to writing, with help from Françoise and despite signs of approaching death. He realizes that every person carries within them the accumulated baggage of their past, and concludes that to be accurate he must describe how everyone occupies an immense range "in Time".

== Themes ==
À la recherche made a decisive break with the 19th-century realist and plot-driven novel, populated by people of action and people representing social and cultural groups or morals. Although parts of the novel could be read as an exploration of snobbery, deceit, jealousy and suffering, and although it contains a multitude of realistic details, the focus is not on the development of a tight plot or of a coherent evolution but on a multiplicity of perspectives and on the formation of experience. The protagonists of the first volume (the narrator as a boy and Swann) are, by the standards of 19th-century novels, remarkably introspective and passive, nor do they trigger action from other leading characters; to contemporary readers, reared on Honoré de Balzac, Victor Hugo and Leo Tolstoy, they would not function as centers of a plot. While there is an array of symbolism in the work, it is rarely defined through explicit "keys" leading to moral, romantic or philosophical ideas. The significance of what is happening is often placed within the memory or into the inner contemplation of what is described. This focus on the relationship between experience, memory and writing, and the radical de-emphasizing of the outward plot have become staples of the modern novel but were almost unheard of in 1913.

Roger Shattuck elucidates an underlying principle in understanding Proust and the various themes present in his novel:

Thus the novel embodies and manifests the principle of intermittence: to live means to perceive different and often conflicting aspects of reality. This iridescence never resolves itself completely into a unitive point of view. Accordingly, it is possible to project out of the Search itself a series of putative and intermittent authors ... The portraitist of an expiring society, the artist of romantic reminiscence, the narrator of the laminated "I," the classicist of formal structure—all these figures are to be found in Proust ...

=== Memory ===
The role of memory is central to the novel, introduced with the famous madeleine episode in the first section of the novel, and in the last volume, Time Regained, a flashback similar to that caused by the madeleine is the beginning of the resolution of the story. Throughout the work many similar instances of involuntary memory, triggered by sensory experiences such as sights, sounds and smells conjure important memories for the narrator and sometimes return attention to an earlier episode of the novel. Although Proust wrote contemporaneously with Sigmund Freud, with there being many points of similarity between their thought on the structures and mechanisms of the human mind, neither author read the other.

The madeleine episode reads:

No sooner had the warm liquid mixed with the crumbs touched my palate than a shudder ran through me and I stopped, intent upon the extraordinary thing that was happening to me. An exquisite pleasure had invaded my senses, something isolated, detached, with no suggestion of its origin. And at once the vicissitudes of life had become indifferent to me, its disasters innocuous, its brevity illusory—this new sensation having had on me the effect which love has of filling me with a precious essence; or rather this essence was not in me it was me. ... Whence did it come? What did it mean? How could I seize and apprehend it? ... And suddenly the memory revealed itself. The taste was that of the little piece of madeleine which on Sunday mornings at Combray (because on those mornings I did not go out before mass), when I went to say good morning to her in her bedroom, my aunt Léonie used to give me, dipping it first in her own cup of tea or tisane. The sight of the little madeleine had recalled nothing to my mind before I tasted it. And all from my cup of tea.

Gilles Deleuze believed that the focus of Proust was not memory and the past but the narrator's learning the use of "signs" to understand and communicate ultimate reality, thereby becoming an artist. While Proust was bitterly aware of the experience of loss and exclusion—loss of loved ones, loss of affection, friendship and innocent joy, which are dramatized in the novel through recurrent jealousy, betrayal and the death of loved ones—his response to this, formulated after he had discovered Ruskin, was that the work of art can recapture the lost and thus save it from destruction, at least in our minds. Art triumphs over the destructive power of time. This element of his artistic thought is clearly inherited from romantic platonism, but Proust combines it with a new intensity in describing jealousy, desire and self-doubt.

=== Separation anxiety ===
Proust begins his novel with the statement, "For a long time I used to go to bed early." This leads to lengthy discussion of his anxiety at leaving his mother at night and his attempts to force her to come and kiss him goodnight, even on nights when the family has company, culminating in a spectacular success, when his father suggests that his mother stay the night with him after he has waylaid her in the hall when she is going to bed.

His anxiety leads to manipulation, much like the manipulation employed by his invalid aunt Léonie and all the lovers in the entire book, who use the same methods of petty tyranny to manipulate and possess their loved ones.

=== Nature of art ===
The nature of art is a motif in the novel and is often explored at great length. Proust sets forth a theory of art in which we are all capable of producing art, if by this we mean taking the experiences of life and transforming them in a way that shows understanding and maturity. Writing, painting, and music are also discussed at great length. Morel the violinist is examined to give an example of a certain type of "artistic" character, along with other fictional artists like the novelist Bergotte, the composer Vinteuil, and the painter Elstir.

As early as the Combray section of Swann's Way, the narrator is concerned with his ability to write, since he desires to pursue a writing career. The transmutation of the experience of a scene in one of the family's usual walks into a short descriptive passage is described and the sample passage given. The narrator presents this passage as an early sample of his own writing, in which he has only had to alter a few words. The question of his own genius relates to all the passages in which genius is recognized or misunderstood because it presents itself in the guise of a humble friend, rather than a passionate artiste.

The question of taste or judgement in art is also an important theme, as exemplified by Swann's exquisite taste in art, which is often hidden from his friends who do not share it or subordinated to his love interests.

=== Homosexuality ===
Questions pertaining to homosexuality appear throughout the novel, particularly in the later volumes. The first arrival of this theme comes in the Combray section of Swann's Way, where the daughter of the piano teacher and composer Vinteuil is seduced, and the narrator observes her having lesbian relations in front of the portrait of her recently deceased father.

The narrator invariably suspects his lovers of liaisons with other women, a repetition of the suspicions held by Charles Swann about his mistress and eventual wife, Odette, in "Swann's Way". The first chapter of "Cities of the Plain" ("Sodom and Gomorrah") includes a detailed account of a sexual encounter between M. de Charlus, the novel's most prominent male homosexual, and his tailor. Critics have often observed that while the character of the narrator is ostensibly heterosexual, Proust intimates that the narrator is a closeted homosexual. The narrator's manner towards male homosexuality is consistently aloof, yet the narrator is unaccountably knowledgeable. This strategy enables Proust to pursue themes related to male homosexuality—in particular the nature of closetedness—from both within and without a homosexual perspective. Proust does not designate Charlus's homosexuality until the middle of the novel, in "Cities"; afterwards the Baron's ostentatiousness and flamboyance, of which he is blithely unaware, completely absorb the narrator's perception. Lesbianism, on the other hand, tortures Swann and the narrator because it presents an inaccessible world. Whereas male homosexual desire is recognizable, insofar as it encompasses male sexuality, Odette's and Albertine's lesbian trysts represent Swann and the narrator's painful exclusion from characters they desire.

There is much debate as to how great a bearing Proust's sexuality has on understanding these aspects of the novel. Although many of Proust's close family and friends suspected that he was homosexual, Proust never admitted this. It was only after his death that André Gide, in his publication of correspondence with Proust, made public Proust's homosexuality. In response to Gide's criticism that he hid his actual sexuality within his novel, Proust told Gide that "one can say anything so long as one does not say 'I'." Proust's intimate relations with such individuals as Alfred Agostinelli and Reynaldo Hahn are well-documented, though Proust was not "out", except perhaps in close-knit social circles.

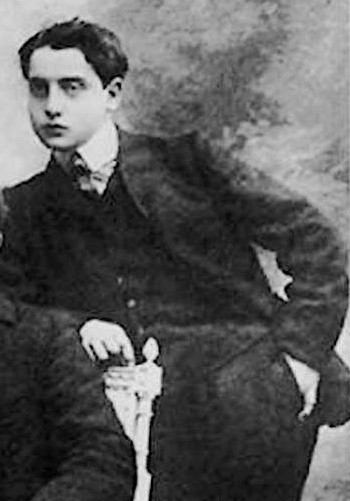
Alfred Agostinelli (1888–1914) around 1905

In 1913, Proust's former regular taxi driver during his summer holidays in Cabourg, Alfred Agostinelli, suddenly reappeared at Proust's house in Paris, looking for work, and was hired as a secretary, as Proust already had a housekeeper-driver but needed support with his work. Agostinelli moved in with his fiancée that May and typed the first volume of "Lost Time". Despite, or perhaps because of, the hopelessness, Proust fell in love with Agostinelli, with whom he had previously only had a brief, temporary affair. This is evident from the letters Proust wrote after Agostinelli "fled" to Nice to be with his family in the spring of 1914 (sometimes using the pseudonym Marcel Swann after his escape) and died shortly thereafter in a plane crash as a pioneer pilot. Proust's relationship with Agostinelli largely shaped the volumes The Prisoner and The Fugitive, in which the novel's heroine, Albertine, and her relationship with the first-person narrator Marcel are modeled after the author's relationship with his secretary.

In 1949, the critic Justin O'Brien published an article in the Publications of the Modern Language Association called "Albertine the Ambiguous: Notes on Proust's Transposition of Sexes", in which he proposed that some female characters are best understood as actually referring to young men. Strip off the feminine ending of the names of the Narrator's lovers, Albertine, Gilberte, and Andrée, and one has their masculine counterparts. This theory has become known as the "transposition of sexes theory" in Proust criticism. The models for the novel's figures were later examined in more detail and it was found that they are not always transpositioned men, for example, Gilberte was modeled on three young women. Edmund White wrote: "In the past gay writers adopted Proust's Albertine strategy, pretending Albert was Albertine, which sometimes made them great observers of women to render the substitution credible. At the very least it made them good liars with good memories. Isn't fiction called "lies like truth?"" It was a common strategy in the "closet era", however Eve Kosofsky Sedgwick and Elisabeth Ladenson point out that feminized forms of masculine names were and are commonplace in French.

== Critical reception ==
In Search of Lost Time is considered, by many scholars and critics, to be the definitive modern novel. It has had a profound effect on subsequent writers, such as the British authors who were members of the Bloomsbury Group. Virginia Woolf wrote in 1922: "Oh if I could write like that!" Edith Wharton wrote that "Every reader enamoured of the art must brood in amazement over the way in which Proust maintains the balance between these two manners—the broad and the minute. His endowment as a novelist—his range of presentation combined with mastery of his instruments—has probably never been surpassed." During Proust's lifetime, on the other hand, while he would achieve success, he would also face criticism from critics of his work. According to Cambridge University Press, "Proust's reception during his lifetime is always set against the backdrop of often-hostile criticism, frequently based on the myth of the sickly, reclusive snob writing from the safety of his cork-lined room."

Harold Bloom wrote that In Search of Lost Time is now "widely recognized as the major novel of the twentieth century". Vladimir Nabokov, in a 1965 interview, named the greatest prose works of the 20th century as, in order, "Joyce's Ulysses, Kafka's Transformation [usually called The Metamorphosis], Bely's Petersburg, and the first half of Proust's fairy tale In Search of Lost Time". J. Peder Zane's book The Top Ten: Writers Pick Their Favorite Books, collates 125 "top 10 greatest books of all time" lists by prominent living writers; In Search of Lost Time is placed eighth. In the 1960s, Swedish literary critic Bengt Holmqvist described the novel as "at once the last great classic of French epic prose tradition and the towering precursor of the 'nouveau roman'", indicating the vogue of new, experimental French prose but also, by extension, other post-war attempts to fuse different planes of location, temporality and fragmented consciousness within the same novel. Michael Dirda wrote that "To its admirers, it remains one of those rare encyclopedic summas, like Chaucer's Canterbury Tales, the essays of Montaigne or Dante's Commedia, that offer insight into our unruly passions and solace for life's miseries." Pulitzer Prize-winning author Michael Chabon has called it his favorite book.

Proust's influence (in parody) is seen in Evelyn Waugh's A Handful of Dust (1934), in which Chapter 1 is entitled "Du Côté de Chez Beaver" and Chapter 6 "Du Côté de Chez Tod". Waugh did not like Proust: in letters to Nancy Mitford in 1948, he wrote, "I am reading Proust for the first time ... and am surprised to find him a mental defective" and later, "I still think [Proust] insane ... the structure must be sane & that is raving." Another hostile critic is Kazuo Ishiguro, who said in an interview: "To be absolutely honest, apart from the opening volume of Proust, I find him crushingly dull."

Since the publication in 1992 of a revised English translation by The Modern Library, based on a new definitive French edition (1987–89), interest in Proust's novel in the English-speaking world has increased. Two substantial new biographies have appeared in English, by Edmund White and William C. Carter, and at least two books about the experience of reading Proust have appeared, Alain de Botton's How Proust Can Change Your Life and Phyllis Rose's The Year of Reading Proust. The Proust Society of America, founded in 1997, has three chapters: at The New York Mercantile Library, the Mechanic's Institute Library in San Francisco, and the Boston Athenæum Library. Furthermore, in 2016, The Proust Society of Greenwich, a non-profit organization, was created to accommodate reading and discussing Proust to readers all over the world through monthly online sessions.

== Main characters ==
Main characters of the novel. Blue lines denote acquaintances and pink lines love interests.

=== The Narrator's household ===
- The Narrator: A sensitive young man who wishes to become a writer, whose identity is kept vague. In volume 5, The Captive, he addresses the reader thus: "Now she began to speak; her first words were 'darling' or 'my darling,' followed by my Christian name, which, if we give the narrator the same name as the author of this book, would produce 'darling Marcel' or 'my darling Marcel.'" (Proust, 64)
- The Narrator's father: A diplomat who initially discourages the Narrator from writing.
- The Narrator's mother: A supportive woman who worries for her son's career.
- Bathilde Amédée: The narrator's grandmother. Her life and death greatly influence her daughter and grandson.
- Aunt Léonie: A sickly woman whom the Narrator visits during stays at Combray.
- Uncle Adolphe: The Narrator's great-uncle, who has many actress friends.
- Françoise: The Narrator's faithful, stubborn maid.

=== The Guermantes ===
- Palamède, Baron de Charlus: An aristocratic, decadent aesthete with many antisocial habits. Model is Robert de Montesquiou.
- Oriane, Duchesse de Guermantes: The toast of Paris high society. She lives in the fashionable Faubourg St. Germain. Models are Comtesse Greffulhe and Laure de Chevigné.
- Robert de Saint-Loup: An army officer and the narrator's best friend. Despite his patrician birth (he is the nephew of M. de Guermantes) and affluent lifestyle, Saint-Loup has no great fortune of his own until he marries Gilberte. Models are Gaston de Cavaillet and Clement de Maugny.
- Marquise de Villeparisis: The aunt of the Baron de Charlus. She is an old friend of the Narrator's grandmother.
- Basin, Duc de Guermantes: Oriane's husband and Charlus's brother. He is a pompous man with a succession of mistresses.
- Prince de Guermantes: The cousin of the Duc and Duchess.
- Princesse de Guermantes: Wife of the Prince.

=== The Swanns ===
- Charles Swann: A friend of the narrator's family, he is mainly modeled on Charles Haas (1832–1902) − with a few aspects of Charles Ephrussi – both friends of Proust. Swann is Jewish, an art connoisseur, and has risen to the highest circles of Parisian society. At the same time, he is a womanizer. His political views on the Dreyfus Affair and marriage to Odette ostracize him from much of high society.
- Odette de Crécy: A Parisian courtesan. Odette is also referred to as Mme. Swann, the lady in pink, and in the final volume, Mme. de Forcheville.
- Gilberte Swann: The daughter of Swann and Odette. She takes the name of her adopted father, M. de Forcheville, after Swann's death, and then becomes Mme. de Saint-Loup following her marriage to Robert de Saint-Loup, which joins Swann's Way and the Guermantes Way.

=== Artists ===
- Elstir: A famous painter whose renditions of sea and sky echo the novel's theme of the mutability of human life. Modeled on Claude Monet.
- Bergotte: A well-known writer whose works the narrator has admired since childhood. The models are Anatole France and Paul Bourget.
- Vinteuil: An obscure musician who gains posthumous recognition for composing a beautiful, evocative sonata, known as the Vinteuil Sonata.
- Berma: A famous actress who specializes in roles by Jean Racine.

=== The Verdurins' "Little Clan" ===
- Madame Verdurin (Sidonie Verdurin): A poseur and a salonnière who rises to the top of society through inheritance, marriage, and sheer single-mindedness. One of the models is Madame Arman de Caillavet.
- M. Verdurin: The husband of Mme. Verdurin, who is her faithful accomplice.
- Cottard: A doctor who is very good at his work.
- Brichot: A pompous academic.
- Saniette: A palaeographer who is subjected to ridicule by the clan.
- M. Biche: A painter who is later revealed to be Elstir.

=== The "little band" of Balbec girls ===
- Albertine Simonet: A privileged orphan of average beauty and intelligence. The narrator's romance with her is the subject of much of the novel.
- Andrée: Albertine's friend, whom the Narrator occasionally feels attracted to.
- Gisèle and Rosemonde: Other members of the little band.
- Octave: Also known as "I'm a wash-out", a rich boy who leads an idle existence at Balbec and is involved with several of the girls. Model is a young Jean Cocteau.

=== Others ===
- Charles Morel: The son of a former servant of the narrator's uncle and a gifted violinist. He profits greatly from the patronage of the Baron de Charlus and later Robert de Saint-Loup.
- Rachel: A prostitute and actress who is the mistress of Robert de Saint-Loup.
- Marquis de Norpois: A diplomat and friend of the Narrator's father. He is involved with Mme. de Villeparisis.
- Albert Bloch: A pretentious Jewish friend of the Narrator, later a successful playwright.
- Jupien: A tailor who has a shop in the courtyard of the Guermantes hotel. He lives with his niece.
- Madame Bontemps: Albertine's aunt and guardian.
- Legrandin: A snobbish friend of the Narrator's family. Engineer and man of letters.
- Marquis and Marquise de Cambremer: Provincial gentry who live near Balbec. Mme. de Cambremer is Legrandin's sister.
- Mlle. Vinteuil: Daughter of the composer Vinteuil. She has a wicked friend who encourages her to lesbianism.
- Léa: A notorious lesbian actress in residence at Balbec.

== English-language translations ==
The first six volumes were first translated into English by the Scotsman C. K. Scott Moncrieff under the title Remembrance of Things Past, a phrase taken from Shakespeare's Sonnet 30; this was the first translation of the Recherche into another language. The individual volumes were Swann's Way, in two books (1922), Within a Budding Grove, in two books (1924), The Guermantes Way, in two books (1925), Cities of the Plain, in two books (1927), The Captive (1929), and The Sweet Cheat Gone (1930). The final volume, Le Temps retrouvé, was initially published in English in the UK as Time Regained (1931), translated by Stephen Hudson (a pseudonym of Sydney Schiff), and in the US as The Past Recaptured (1932) in a translation by Frederick Blossom. There were thus eleven books in the original English translation. Although cordial with Scott Moncrieff, Proust grudgingly remarked in a letter that Remembrance eliminated the correspondence between Temps perdu and Temps retrouvé (Painter, 352). Terence Kilmartin revised the Scott Moncrieff translation in 1981, using the first French "La Pléiade" edition of 1954, edited by Pierre Clarac et André Ferré. An additional revision by D. J. Enright—that is, a revision of a revision—was published by the Modern Library in 1992. It is based on the second "La Pléiade" edition of the French text edited by Jean-Yves Tadié (1987–89), and rendered the title of the novel more literally as In Search of Lost Time. It also includes an index/concordance to the novel compiled by Terence Kilmartin that was published in 1983 as the Reader's Guide to the Remembrance of Things Past. The guide contains four indices: fictional characters from the novels; actual persons; places; and themes.

In 1995, Penguin undertook a fresh translation based on the second "La Pléiade" French text (published in 1987–89) of In Search of Lost Time by a team of seven different translators overseen by editor Christopher Prendergast. The six volumes were published in Britain under the Allen Lane imprint in 2002, each volume under the name of a separate translator, the first volume being American writer Lydia Davis, and the others under English translators and one Australian, James Grieve. The first four volumes were published in the US under the Viking imprint as hardcover editions in 2003–2004, while the entire set is available in paperback under the Penguin Classics imprint.

Both the Modern Library and Penguin translations provide a detailed plot synopsis at the end of each volume. The last volume of the Modern Library edition, Time Regained, also includes Kilmartin's "A Guide to Proust", a set of four indexes covering the (fictional) characters, (real) persons, places (both real and fictional), and themes in the novel. The Modern Library volumes include a handful of endnotes, and alternative versions of some of the novel's famous episodes. The Penguin volumes each provide an extensive set of brief, non-scholarly endnotes that help identify cultural references perhaps unfamiliar to contemporary English readers. Reviews that discuss the merits of both translations can be found online at the Observer, the Telegraph, The New York Review of Books, The New York Times, TempsPerdu.com, and Reading Proust.

From 2013 to 2025, Yale University Press published a new revision of Scott Moncrieff's translation, edited and annotated by William C. Carter, at the rate of one volume every two or three years, using Andreas Mayor's translation for the final volume.

After a partial translation of the first volume in 2018, since 2023 Oxford University Press is publishing a new, complete translation, edited by Adam Watt.

=== Scott Moncrieff and subsequent revisions ===
- Remembrance of Things Past, translated by C. K. Scott Moncrieff. London: Chatto & Windus.
  Ten books: Swann's Way, in two books (1922), Within a Budding Grove, in two books (1924), The Guermantes Way, in two books (1925), Cities of the Plain, in two books (1927), The Captive (1929), and The Sweet Cheat Gone (1930).
- Remembrance of Things Past, translated by C. K. Scott Moncrieff and Terence Kilmartin, with Andreas Mayor (Time Regained). New York: Random House, 1981 (3 vols). ISBN 0-394-71243-9
  Three books: Vol. 1: Swann's Way; Within a Budding Grove—Vol. 2: The Guermantes Way; Cities of the Plain—Vol. 3: The Captive; The Fugitive; Time Regained
- In Search of Lost Time, translated by C. K. Scott Moncrieff and Terence Kilmartin, with Andreas Mayor (Time Regained). Revised by D.J. Enright. London: Chatto and Windus, New York: The Modern Library, 1992. Based on the second French "La Pléiade" edition (1987–89). ISBN 0-8129-6964-2
  Six books: Swann's Way—Within a Budding Grove—The Guermantes Way—Sodom and Gomorrah—The Captive; The Fugitive—Time Regained.
- In Search of Lost Time, translated by C. K. Scott Moncrieff, with Andreas Mayor (Time Regained), edited and annotated by William C. Carter (New Haven: Yale University Press, 2013, 2015, 2018, 2021, 2023, 2025).
  Six books: Swann's Way ISBN 978-0300185430; In the Shadow of Young Girls in Flower ISBN 978-0300185423; The Guermantes Way ISBN 978-0300186192; Sodom and Gomorrah ISBN 978-0300186208; The Captive and The Fugitive ISBN 978-0300186215; Time Regained ISBN 978-0300186222

=== Penguin Proust ===
- In Search of Lost Time (General Editor: Christopher Prendergast), translated by Lydia Davis, James Grieve, Mark Treharne, John Sturrock, Carol Clark, Peter Collier, & Ian Patterson. London: Allen Lane, 2002 (6 vols). Based on the second French "La Pléiade" edition (1987–89), except The Fugitive, which is based on the first French "La Pléiade" edition (1954). The first four volumes have been published in New York by Viking, 2003–04.
  Six books: The Way by Swann's (in the U.S., Swann's Way) ISBN 0-14-243796-4; In the Shadow of Young Girls in Flower ISBN 0-14-303907-5; The Guermantes Way ISBN 0-14-303922-9; Sodom and Gomorrah ISBN 0-14-303931-8; The Prisoner; and The Fugitive – Finding Time Again.

=== Oxford Proust ===
- The Swann Way by Brian Nelson (Oxford, 2023)
- In the Shadow of Girls in Blossom by Charlotte Mandell (Oxford, 2025)
- The Guermantes Way by Peter Bush (Oxford, 2026)
- Sodom and Gomorrah by Helen Constantine (Oxford, 2026)
- The Captive by Andrew Rothwell (Oxford, 2027)

=== Individual translators ===
==== Partial ====
- Swann in Love by Brian Nelson (Oxford, 2018)
- Swann in Love by Lucy Raitz (Pushkin, 2022)

==== Volume 1 ====
- A Search for Lost Time: Swann's Way by James Grieve (Australian National University, 1982)
- Swann's Way by Richard Howard (Macmillan, 1992)
- The Way by Swann's (UK) / Swann's Way (US) by Lydia Davis (Allen Lane, 2002)
- The Swann Way by Brian Nelson (Oxford, 2023)

==== Volume 2 ====
- In the Shadow of Young Girls in Flower by James Grieve (Allen Lane, 2002)
- In the Shadow of Girls in Blossom by Charlotte Mandell (Oxford, 2025)

==== Volume 3 ====
- The Guermantes Way by Mark Treharne (Allen Lane, 2002)
- The Guermantes Way by Peter Bush (Oxford, 2026)

==== Volume 4 ====
- Sodom and Gomorrah by John Sturrock (Allen Lane, 2002)
- Sodom and Gomorrah by Helen Constantine (Oxford, 2026)

==== Volume 5 ====
- The Captive by Carol Clark (Allen Lane, 2002)

==== Volume 6 ====
- Albertine Gone by Terence Kilmartin (Chatto & Windus, 1989)
- The Fugitive by Peter Collier (Allen Lane, 2002)

==== Volume 7 ====
- Time Regained by Stephen Hudson (Sydney Schiff) (Chatto & Windus, 1931)
- The Past Recaptured by Frederick Blossom (Random House, 1932)
- The Past Recaptured by Andreas Mayor (Random House, 1970)
- Finding Time Again by Ian Patterson (Allen Lane, 2002)
- Time Regained by David Whiting (Naxos AudioBooks, 2012)

== Adaptations ==
=== Print ===
- The Proust Screenplay, a film adaptation by Harold Pinter published in 1978 (never filmed).
- Remembrance of Things Past, Part One: Combray; Part Two: Within a Budding Grove, vol. 1; Part Three: Within a Budding Grove, vol. 2; and Part Four: Un amour de Swann, vol. 1 are graphic novel adaptations by Franco-Belgian comics artist Stéphane Heuet in 1988.
- Albertine, a parallel novel based on a rewriting of Albertine by Jacqueline Rose. Vintage UK, 2002.

=== Audio ===
- Remembrance of Things Past narrated by Neville Jason for Naxos Audiobooks, abridged 1995–2002, unabridged 2010–2012.

=== Film ===
- Basileus Quartet (Quartetto Basileus), a 1982 film by Fabio Carpi, uses segments from Sodom and Gomorrah and Time Regained.
- Swann in Love (Un Amour de Swann), a 1984 film by Volker Schlöndorff starring Jeremy Irons and Ornella Muti.
- Time Regained (Le Temps retrouvé), a 1999 film by Raúl Ruiz starring Catherine Deneuve, Emmanuelle Béart, and John Malkovich.
- La Captive, a 2000 film by Chantal Akerman.

=== Television ===
- Les Cent Livres des Hommes: "Du côté de chez Swann", a 1971 episode by Claude Santelli starring Marie-Christine Barrault and Isabelle Huppert.
- The Modern World: Ten Great Writers: "Marcel Proust's 'A la recherche du temps perdu'", a 1988 episode by Nigel Wattis starring Roger Rees.
- À la recherche du temps perdu (2011) by Nina Companéez, a four-hour, two-part French TV movie that covers all seven volumes.

=== Stage ===
- Proust ou les intermittences du coeur, a ballet by Roland Petit. Premiered at Opéra de Monte-Carlo in 1974 by Ballet National de Marseille.
- A Waste of Time, by Philip Prowse and Robert David MacDonald. A 4-hour long adaptation with a huge cast. Dir. by Philip Prowse at the Glasgow Citizens' Theatre in 1980, revived 1981 plus European tour.
- Remembrance of Things Past, by Harold Pinter and Di Trevis, based on Pinter's The Proust Screenplay. Dir. by Trevis (who had acted in A Waste of Time – see above) at the Royal National Theatre in 2000.
- Eleven Rooms of Proust, adapted and directed by Mary Zimmerman. A series of 11 vignettes from In Search of Lost Time, staged throughout an abandoned factory in Chicago.
- My Life with Albertine, a 2003 Off-Broadway musical with book by Richard Nelson, music by Ricky Ian Gordon, and lyrics by both.
- Du côté de chez Proust, a 2005 solo performance adapted and acted by Jacques Sereys, directed by Jean-Luc Tardieu, performed again in 2012 at the Comédie-Française.
- Le Côté de Guermantes, adapted and directed by Christophe Honoré, created in 2020 at Comédie-Française's Théâtre Marigny, with Loïc Corbery, Laurent Lafitte and Dominique Blanc.

=== Radio ===
- The Proust Screenplay, a radio play adapted from Harold Pinter's screenplay by Michael Bakewell, directed by Ned Chaillet, featuring Pinter as narrator, broadcast on BBC Radio 3 on May 11, 1997.
- In Search of Lost Time dramatised by Michael Butt for The Classic Serial, broadcast on BBC Radio 4 between February 6, 2005, and March 13, 2005. Starring James Wilby, it condensed the entire series into six episodes. Although considerably shortened, it received excellent reviews.
- Marcel Proust's In Search of Lost Time, translated from French and dramatised by Timberlake Wertenbaker and broadcast on BBC Radio 4 in 2019, with Derek Jacobi as the narrator.

== References in popular culture ==
- Andy Warhol's 1955 book A La Recherche du Shoe Perdu marked Warhol's "transition from commercial to gallery artist".
- The British television series Monty Python's Flying Circus (1969–1974) references the book and its author in two episodes. In the "Fish Licence" sketch, Mr. Praline mentions that Proust "had an 'addock" as a pet fish, and warns, when his listener laughs, "if you're calling the author of À la recherche du temps perdu a looney, I shall have to ask you to step outside!" In another sketch entitled "The All-England Summarize Proust Competition", contestants are required to summarize all of Proust's seven volumes of the novel in 15 seconds.
- Science fiction author Gene Wolfe cited Proust as an influence, saying: "Proust, of course, was obsessed with some of the same things I deal with in The Book of the New Sun – memory and the way memory affects us." The opening line of his novella The Fifth Head of Cerberus is a paraphrase of the first sentence of Swann's Way.
- The 1998 television series Serial Experiments Lain concludes with an allusion to the madeleine episode of Lost Time.
- The 2012 television series Psycho Pass concludes with a shot of the protagonist, with Swann's Way (スワン家の方へ) opened on his coffee table.
- In Larry McMurtry's 1999 novel Duane's Depressed, Duane Moore's therapist assigns him the task of reading the Proust novel. She tells him, "The reason I made you read Proust is because it's still the greatest catalogue of the varieties of disappointment human beings feel."
- In the third episode of the third season of The Sopranos, "Fortunate Son" (2001), Tony Soprano has a breakthrough about the role the smell of meat plays in triggering his panic attacks, which his therapist, Dr. Jennifer Melfi, likens to Proust's madeleines.
- In Haruki Murakami's 1Q84 (2009), the main character Aomame spends an entire fall locked in an apartment, where the book becomes her only entertainment. Aomame's days are spent eating, sleeping, working out, staring off the balcony to the city below and the Moon above, and slowly reading through Lost Time.
- In Ruth Ozeki's A Tale for the Time Being (2013), a French edition of the novel is turned into a diary by a handicraft saleswoman in Harajuku. The diary is bought by protagonist Nao Yasutani, and later discovered by Ruth when it washes ashore in British Columbia.
- Dan Simmons's science fiction duology Ilium and Olympos features frequent references to In Search of Lost Time. In Ilium, the character Mahnmut, a Jovian moravec (robot), is an avid reader of Proust and often reflects on his themes of memory and time. These references continue in Olympos with subtler allusions.
- In the 2018 movie, The Equalizer 2, In Search of lost time was the final book on Robert McCall's '100 books to read' list. He was shown buying this book from a book store.

== See also ==
- Le Monde's 100 Books of the Century
- Mono no aware

== Notes and references ==
=== Bibliography ===
- Bouillaguet, Annick and Rogers, Brian G. Dictionnaire Marcel Proust. Paris: Honoré Champion, 2004. ISBN 2-7453-0956-0
- Douglas-Fairbank, Robert. "In search of Marcel Proust" in the Guardian, November 17, 2002.
- Kilmartin, Terence. "Note on the Translation." Remembrance of Things Past. Vol. 1. New York: Vintage, 1981: ix–xii. ISBN 0-394-71182-3
- Painter, George. Marcel Proust: A Biography. Vol. 2. New York: Random House, 1959. ISBN 0-394-50041-5
- Proust, Marcel. (Carol Clark, Peter Collier, trans.) The Prisoner and The Fugitive. London: Penguin Books Ltd, 2003. ISBN 0-14-118035-8
- Shattuck, Roger. Proust's Binoculars. Chatto & Windus London, 1964.
- Shattuck, Roger. Proust's Way: A Field Guide To in Search of Lost Time. New York: W W Norton, 2000. ISBN 0-393-32180-0
- Tadié, J-Y. (Euan Cameron, trans.) Marcel Proust: A Life. New York: Penguin Putnam, 2000. ISBN 0-14-100203-4
- Terdiman, Richard. Present Past: Modernity and the Memory Crisis. Ithaca: Cornell UP, 1993. ISBN 0-8014-8132-5
- Woolf, Virginia. The Letters of Virginia Woolf. Eds. Nigel Nicolson and Joanne Trautmann. 7 vols. New York: Harcourt, 1976, 1977.
- Beugnet, Martin and Schmid, Marion. Proust at the Movies. Burlington, VT: Ashgate, 2004.
