= C. K. Scott Moncrieff =

Scottish writer and translator (1889–1930)

C. K. Scott Moncrieff MC
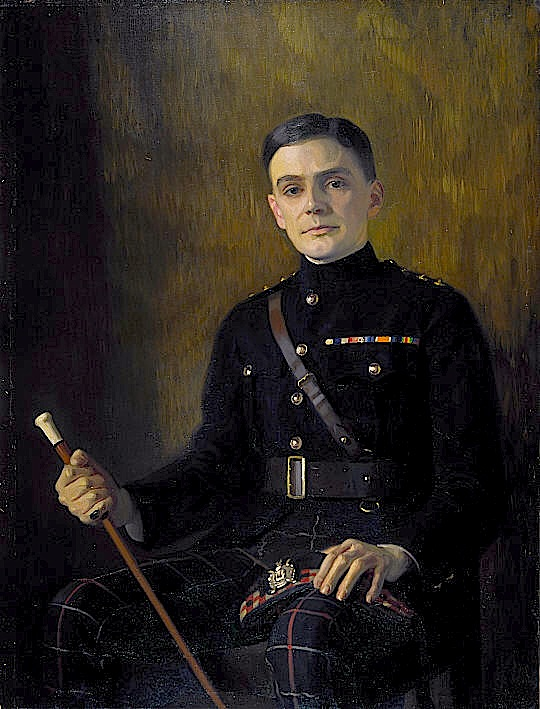
- C. K. Scott Moncrieff painted by Edward Stanley Mercer (1889–1932)
- Born: Charles Kenneth Scott Moncrieff; 25 September 1889; Stirlingshire, Scotland
- Died: 28 February 1930 (aged 40); Rome, Italy
- Resting place: Campo Verano, Rome
- Education: University of Edinburgh
- Occupations: Writer; translator
- Writing career
- Period: 1894–1930

Charles Kenneth Scott Moncrieff MC (25 September 1889 – 28 February 1930) was a Scottish writer and translator, most famous for his English translation of most of Marcel Proust's In Search of Lost Time, which he published under the Shakespearean title Remembrance of Things Past. He translated six out of the seven volumes of Proust's masterpiece including, Swann's Way (1922), Within a Budding Grove (1924), The Guermantes Way (1925), Cities of the Plain (1928), The Captive (1929), and The Sweet Cheat Gone (1930).

== Early life ==
Charles Kenneth Scott Moncrieff was born at Weedingshall, Stirlingshire, in 1889, the youngest son of William George Scott Moncrieff (1846–1927), Advocate, Sheriff Substitute, and Jessie Margaret Scott Moncrieff (1858–1936). He had two elder brothers: Colin William (1879–1943), father of the Scottish author and playwright George Scott Moncrieff; and John Irving Scott Moncrieff (1881–1920).

== Education ==
=== Winchester College ===
In 1903, Scott Moncrieff was accepted as a scholar to Winchester College.

In 1907, while a scholar at Winchester College, Scott Moncrieff met Christopher Sclater Millard, bibliographer of Wildeana and private secretary to Oscar Wilde's literary executor and friend Robbie Ross.

In the Spring 1908, he published a short story, 'Evensong and Morwe Song', in the pageant issue of New Field, a literary magazine of which he was the editor. The story's sensational opening implies fellatio between two boys at a fictional public school 'Gainsborough' but its action principally concerns the hypocrisy of William Carruthers, the elder of the boys, who as headmaster of 'Cheddar' school, goes on to expel, for the same offence, the son of the boy he seduced. The story was republished in 1923 by Uranian publisher John Murray in an edition of fifty copies for private circulation only. The magazine was hastily suppressed. Though it is sometimes stated that Scott Moncrieff was expelled from Winchester there is no evidence of this, though his biographer, Jean Findlay suggests that the scandal cost him the opportunity to go up to Oxford.

=== The University of Edinburgh ===
After Winchester Scott Moncrieff attended the University of Edinburgh, where he undertook two degrees, one in law and then one in English literature. He then began an MA in Anglo-Saxon under the supervision of George Saintsbury. In 1913 Scott Moncrieff won the Patterson Bursary in Anglo Saxon. In 1914 he graduated with first-class honours. This stood him in good stead for his translation of Beowulf, published in 1919.

During his time at Edinburgh Scott Moncrieff met Philip Bainbrigge, then an undergraduate at Trinity College, Cambridge with whom he began a relationship that lasted until Bainbrigge's death at the Battle of Épehy in September 1918. Bainbrigge was for a time a schoolmaster at Shrewsbury, and the author of miscellaneous homoerotic odes to "Uranian Love". as well as the comic play Achilles in Sycros.

== First World War and military service ==
Having been a cadet of the Edinburgh University Contingent of the Officers Training Corps, Scott Moncrieff was commissioned as a second lieutenant on 19 March 1913 in the General Reserve of Officers, British Army. On 9 August 1914, he transferred to the Kings Own Scottish Borderers and was promoted to lieutenant. He served with the 2nd Battalion in Flanders on the Western Front from 1914 to 1917. Having been posted to France in the opening months of the war, he qualified for the 1914 Star. He was promoted to captain on 2 February 1915. He converted to Roman Catholicism at the front in 1915. On 23 April 1917, while he was leading the 1st Battalion in the Battle of Arras, he was seriously wounded by an exploding shell. He avoided amputation, but the injuries to his left leg disqualified him from further active service and left him permanently lame. In May 1917, he was awarded the Military Cross (MC).

After his release from hospital in March 1918, Scott Moncrieff worked at the War Office in Whitehall. He supplemented his income by writing reviews for the New Witness, a literary magazine edited by G. K. Chesterton.

At Robert Graves's wedding in January 1918, Scott Moncrieff met the war poet Wilfred Owen, in whose work he took a keen interest. Through his role at the War Office, Scott Moncrieff attempted to secure Owen a home posting and, according to Owen's biographer Dominic Hibberd, the evidence suggests a "brief sexual relationship that somehow failed".

After Owen's death in late 1918, Scott Moncrieff's failure to secure a "safe" posting for Owen was viewed with suspicion by Owen's friends, including Osbert Sitwell and Siegfried Sassoon. During the 1920s Scott Moncrieff maintained a rancorous rivalry with Sitwell, who depicted him unflatteringly as "Mr X" in All at Sea. Scott Moncrieff responded with the pamphlet "The Strange and Striking Adventure of Four Authors in Search of a Character, 1926", a satire on the Sitwell family.

Through his friendship with the young Noël Coward, Scott Moncrieff made the acquaintance of Mrs Astley Cooper and became a frequent guest at her home, Hambleton Hall. He dedicated the first volume of his translation of Proust to Cooper.

== Post-war work ==
After the war, in 1920 and 1921, Scott Moncrieff worked for a year as private secretary to the press baron Alfred Harmsworth, 1st Viscount Northcliffe, owner of The Times. He then transferred to the editorial staff in Printing House Square, while also working as a journalist for The Times. Claud Cockburn, who worked in Printing House Square a few years later, wrote that the work of the Foreign Room was often held up for as much as half an hour while everyone was consulted about "the precise English word or phrase which would best convey the meaning and flavour of a passage in the Recherche du Temps Perdu", which Scott Moncrieff was then engaged in translating. In 1923, he moved to Italy for the sake of his health and divided his time between Florence, Pisa, and, later, Rome. He supported himself with literary work, notably translations from medieval and modern French.

Scott Moncrieff published the first volume of his Proust translation in 1922 and continued to work on the other volumes until his death in 1930. By then he was working on the final volume. His choice of the title Remembrance of Things Past, by which Proust's novel has long been known in English, is not a literal translation of the original French: it is taken from the second line of Shakespeare's Sonnet 30: "When to the sessions of sweet silent thought / I summon up remembrance of things past".

By the autumn of 1921, Scott Moncrieff had resigned his employment with The Times, and was determined to live from then on by translation alone. He had already successfully published his translations of Song of Roland and Beowulf, and now undertook to translate Proust's lengthy masterpiece in its entirety. He persuaded the publishers Chatto & Windus to undertake the project.

On 9 September 1922 Sydney Schiff, a friend and admirer of Proust, was alarmed by the following publisher's announcement in The Athenaeum:

Messrs Chatto & Windus, as publishers, and Mr Scott Moncrieff, as author, have almost ready the first instalment of M. Marcel Proust’s Remembrance of Things Past in the English translation. The title of this initial volume is 'Swann’s Way.'

Schiff hastened to inform Proust that the titles in the English version were "hopelessly inaccurate". Proust, highly distressed, considered preventing the publication of the translation, but Swann's Way came out in English as scheduled on 19 September 1922. "Despite his shaky acquaintance with English, Proust was relieved a little as he struggled through his own copy by the beauty he dimly perceived." The English reviews were extremely complimentary both to the work itself and to the translation.

On 10 October 1922, Proust wrote to Scott Moncrieff, thanked him for "the trouble you have taken," and complimented him on his "fine talent." However, he added: "The verses you have inserted and the dedication to your friends are no substitute for the intentional ambiguity of my Temps perdu, which corresponds to the Temps retrouvé that appears at the end of my work." Proust also thought that Swann's Way might have been better called To Swann's Way.

Scott Moncrieff replied as follows: "My dear Sir, I beg that you will allow me to thank you for your very gratifying letter in English as my knowledge of French—as you have shown me, with regard to your titles, is too imperfect, too stunted a growth for me to weave from it the chapelet [wreath] that I would fain offer you. Are you still suffering—which I am very sorry to hear, and wish that my real sympathy could bring you some relief—I am making my reply to your critiques on another sheet, and by the aid of a machine which I hope you do not abominate: it is the machine on which Swann and one-third of the Jeunes Filles have been translated. Thus you can throw away this sheet unread, or keep it, or inflict it upon M. Gallimard." As Proust died very shortly after, on 18 November 1922, they had no further correspondence.

The further volumes of Scott Moncrieff's Remembrance were published in the following sequence:

- II. Within a Budding Grove (1924)
- III. The Guermantes Way (1925)
- IV. Cities of the Plain (1928)
- V. The Captive (1929)
- VI. The Sweet Cheat Gone (1930)

== Death and remembrance ==
Scott Moncrieff died of cancer in 1930, aged 40, at the Calvary Hospital in Rome, leaving the translation of the final volume of the Remembrance to the hands of Sydney Schiff. Scott Moncrieff was buried in the Campo Verano, in a small communal ossuary with the remains of those who died in the same month at the same convent. (The exact place can be located by doing a search by name and date of death at the gate.)

The French text of Remembrance was re-edited in later years, in two successive editions, and these additions and revisions have since been incorporated in later English translations. Terence Kilmartin revised Scott Moncrieff's translation in 1981 and an additional revision was made by D. J. Enright in 1992. Some publishers have given Enright's the literally translated title In Search of Lost Time, though Enright retained Scott Moncrieff's titles for the individual volumes. In 2013, Yale University Press began to publish a new version of Scott Moncrieff's translation, edited and annotated by William C. Carter, but under the title In Search of Lost Time instead of Scott Moncrieff's preferred title.

The Society of Authors administers the annual award of a Scott Moncrieff Prize for French Translation.

A biography of Scott Moncrieff, Chasing Lost Time: The Life of C K Scott Moncrieff, Soldier, Spy and Translator, written by his great-great-niece Jean Findlay, was published in 2014.

== Bibliography ==
Among the many works translated by Scott Moncrieff are:

- Widsith, Beowulf, Finnsburgh, Waldere, Deor
- Proust, Remembrance of Things Past [Volumes I to VI]
- Stendhal, The Red and The Black and The Charterhouse of Parma
- Works by Pirandello
- The Song of Roland
- The Collected Letters of Peter Abelard and Heloise the abbess
- De Biron's Memoirs of the Duc de Lauzun
- Moncrif's Adventures of Zeloide & Amanzarifdine
- Bloch's --- & Co.

Scott Moncrieff also had his own poetry, short stories and war serials regularly published in literary periodicals

- Ant - Collected Short Stories, War Serials, and Selected Poems of C. K. Scott Moncrieff (Scotland Street Press, 2016)
