= Madeleine (cake) =

Sponge cake made with a génoise

Madeleines
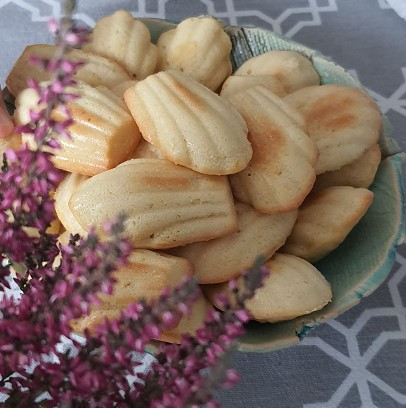
- Type: Cake
- Place of origin: France
- Region or state: Commercy and Liverdun, Lorraine
- Main ingredients: Flour, sugar, eggs, butter
- Variations: Almonds or other nuts, citrus zest, cocoa

The madeleine (English: /ˈmædəlɪn/ MAD-əl-in, /ˈmædəleɪn/ MAD-əl-ayn or /ˌmædəlˈeɪn/ MAD-əl-AYN, French: [madlɛn]) is a small traditional cake that originated in Commercy and Liverdun, two communes of the Lorraine region in northeastern France.

Madeleines are very small sponge cakes with a distinctive scallop shape acquired from being baked in pans with shell-shaped depressions.

Marcel Proust's description of his experience as an adult of the taste of a madeleine dipped in tea triggering memories of childhood in his early 20th century Remembrance of Things Past caused the term 'Proustian' to become synonymous with something that "evok(es) the recall of a forgotten memory".

== Invention ==
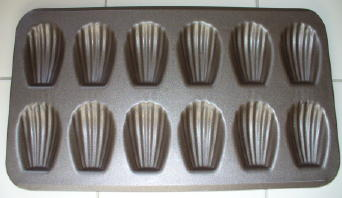
Madeleine pan

Several legends are attached to the development of the madeleine. They have tended to center on a woman named Madeleine who is said to have been in the service of an important character in the history of Lorraine – although there is neither consensus over the last name of the cook nor the identity of the famous character. Some believe that the illustrious patron was 17th-century cardinal and rebel Paul de Gondi, who owned a castle in Commercy.

Others think that the inventor was named Madeleine Paulmier, who is said to have been a cook in the 18th century for Stanislaus I, duke of Lorraine and exiled King of Poland. The story goes that, in 1755, Louis XV, son-in-law of the duke, charmed by the little cakes prepared by Madeleine Paulmier, named them after her, while his wife, Maria Leszczyńska, introduced them soon afterward to the court in Versailles. Another version claims Leszczynska herself created them with help from her own cook, a woman named Madeleine.

Other stories have linked the cake with the pilgrimage to Compostela, in Spain: a pilgrim named Madeleine is said to have brought the recipe from France to Compostela, or a cook named Madeleine is said to have offered little cakes in the shape of a shell to the pilgrims passing through Lorraine on the Camino to visit the burial place of St. James, whom the scallop symbolizes. This version of the origin story argues that the madeleine was originally Spanish and was imported to Lorraine.

Other stories do not give the cake a Lorraine origin and lay its invention at the feet of pastry chef Jean Avice, who worked in the kitchens of Prince Talleyrand. Avice is said to have invented the madeleine in the 19th century by baking little cakes in moulds normally reserved for aspic.

== Description ==
Madeleines are characterized both by the shell pattern with well-defined ridges on one side and by the typical bump or hump on the other side. The interior is tender and the exterior is crisp.

== Ingredients, preparation, and serving ==
A génoise sponge cake batter is used. The flavour is similar to but the texture somewhat lighter than the typical sponge cake. Some recipes include very finely ground nuts, usually almonds, or the zest of lemons or oranges. The batter is scooped or piped into a madeleine pan and baked. Madeleines are often served for breakfast or tea and often are dunked in coffee or tea. They are best served the day they are baked and ideally still warm from the oven as they stale quickly.

=== First recipes ===
The term madeleine, used to describe a small cake, seems to appear for the first time in France in the middle of the 18th century. In 1758, a French retainer of Lord Southwell, an Irish Jacobite refugee in France, was said to prepare "cakes à la Madeleine and other small desserts".

Cakes à la Madeleine
On a pound of flour, you need a pound of butter, eight egg whites & yolks, three fourths of a pound of fine sugar, a half glass of water, a little grated lime, or preserved lemon rind minced very finely, orange blossom praliné; knead the whole together, & make little cakes, that you will serve iced with sugar.
Menon, Les soupers de la Cour ou L'art de travailler toutes sortes d'aliments, p.282 (1755).

The appearance of the madeleine is indicative of the increasing use of metal moulds in European baking in the 18th century (see also Canelés), but the commercial success of the madeleine dates back to the early years of the 19th century. Several mentions of the madeleine are made by culinary writers during the Napoleonic era, in particular in the recipe books of Antonin Carême and by famous gastronomer Grimod de la Reynière.

In Commercy, the production at a large scale of madeleines is said to have begun in the 1760s. In addition to being sold at the rail station, thus accelerating their spread through the country, it is likely that the cakes were exported to Paris along with the marmalade from Bar-le-duc and the croquantes from Rheims. By the end of the 19th century, the madeleine was considered a staple of the diet of the French bourgeoisie.

== Popularity ==
Commercy was a stop on the railroad between Paris and Strasbourg, and passengers from other areas were offered madeleines by platform-side vendors. According to Patricia Wells, writing for the New York Times in 1983, madeleines are "one of the few pastries that French women, accustomed to buying most pastries and breads at pastry shops, do make at home" and were a common first baking project.

== Literary reference ==
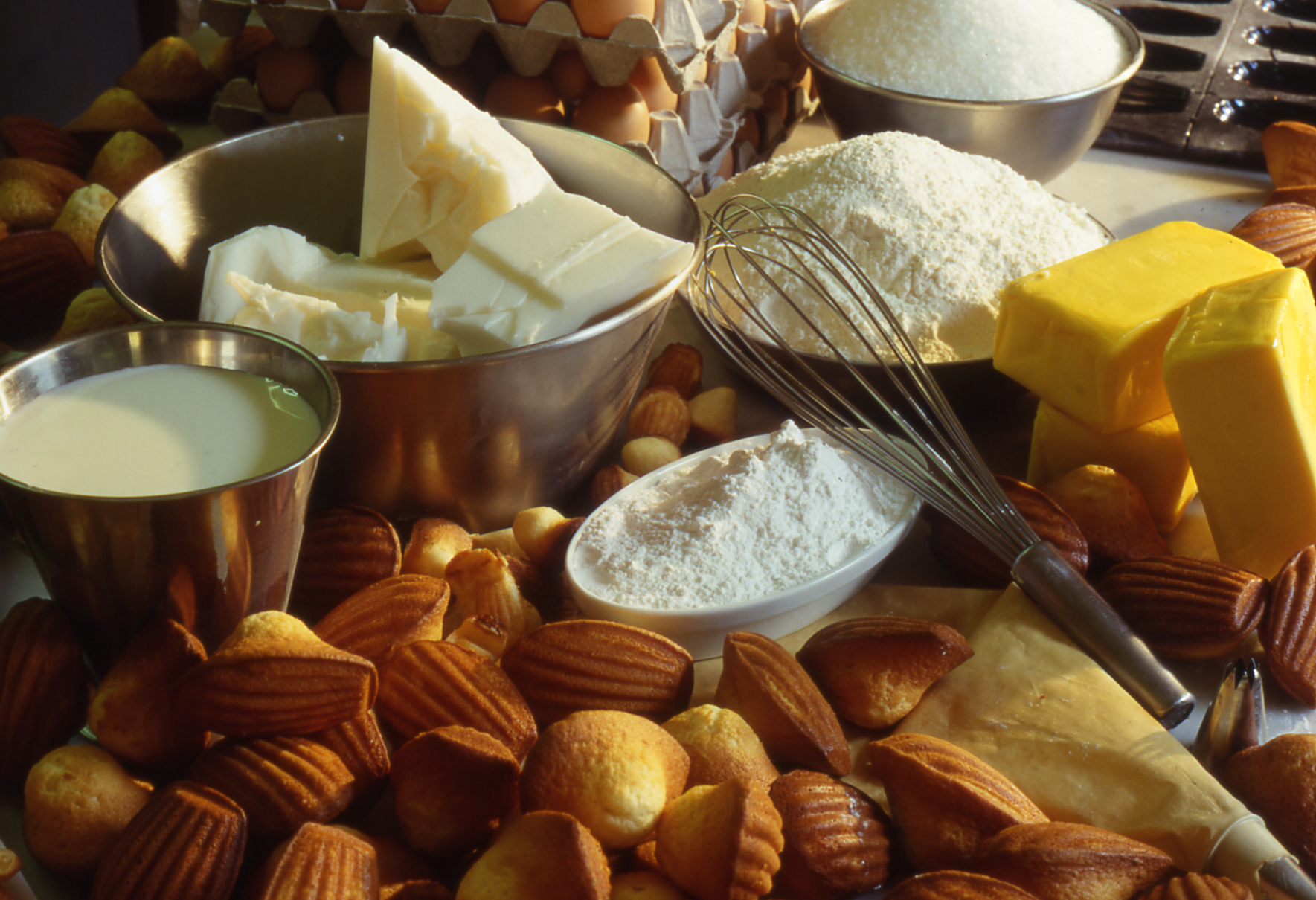
Madeleine ingredients

In In Search of Lost Time (also known as Remembrance of Things Past), author Marcel Proust uses madeleines to contrast involuntary memory with voluntary memory. The latter designates memories retrieved by "intelligence", that is, memories produced by putting conscious effort into remembering events, people, and places. Proust's narrator laments that such memories are inevitably partial, and do not bear the "essence" of the past. The most famous instance of involuntary memory by Proust is known as the "episode of the madeleine", yet there are at least half a dozen other examples in In Search of Lost Time.

No sooner had the warm liquid mixed with the crumbs touched my palate than a shudder ran through me and I stopped, intent upon the extraordinary thing that was happening to me. An exquisite pleasure had invaded my senses, something isolated, detached, with no suggestion of its origin. And at once the vicissitudes of life had become indifferent to me, its disasters innocuous, its brevity illusory – this new sensation having had on me the effect which love has of filling me with a precious essence; or rather this essence was not in me it was me. ... Whence did it come? What did it mean? How could I seize and apprehend it? ... And suddenly the memory revealed itself. The taste was that of the little piece of madeleine which on Sunday mornings at Combray (because on those mornings I did not go out before mass), when I went to say good morning to her in her bedroom, my aunt Léonie used to give me, dipping it first in her own cup of tea or tisane. The sight of the little madeleine had recalled nothing to my mind before I tasted it. And all from my cup of tea.

— Marcel Proust, In Search of Lost Time (1913, first English publication 1922)

The "episode of the madeleines" is considered one of the most important moments in the work and to "encapsulat(e) its theme of involuntary memory". The terms 'Proustian' and 'memoires de Proust' are often used to refer to something that "evok(es) the recall of a forgotten memory".

== Similarly named foods ==
English madeleines

In the UK a madeleine, also known as an Eiffel Tower cake, is an individual sponge cake baked in a dariole mould. After cooking, these are coated in jam and desiccated coconut and are usually topped with a glacé cherry.

== See also ==
- Bahulu, a Malaysian version of madeleines, inspired by European influence
- Financier, a similar cake with ground almonds and much more butter
