= Terence Kilmartin =

Terence Kevin Kilmartin CBE (10 January 1922 – 17 August 1991) was an Irish-born translator who served as the literary editor of The Observer between 1952 and 1986. He is best known for his 1981 revision of the Scott Moncrieff translation of Remembrance of Things Past by Marcel Proust.

== Early life and career in journalism ==
Kilmartin was born on 10 January 1922 in the Irish Free State. Moving to England as a child, he was educated at Xaverian College in Mayfield, East Sussex. His knowledge of French was limited at the age of 17, when he was recruited to teach English to a French family's children.

During the Second World War, Kilmartin was keen to serve in the armed forces, but with only one kidney he was deemed medically unfit. Instead he served in the Special Operations Executive (SOE). He worked in London under Colonel Maurice Buckmaster. Kilmartin defied orders from Buckmaster in 1944 to take part in a parachute jump into France as part of Operation Jedburgh. He subsequently earned medals for his military service. During his time at SOE Kilmartin became acquainted with David Astor.

His first post after the war was as a radio journalist, before he joined the staff of The Observer in 1949. Initially, he worked in the foreign affairs office of the newspaper, becoming assistant literary editor in 1950 and literary editor in 1952.

As literary editor of The Observer, Kilmartin commissioned reviews from Anthony Burgess beginning in 1960 and from Martin Amis in the early 1970s.

== Translation and Proust ==
Kilmartin began to work as a translator from French with the major works of Henry de Montherlant: The Bachelors, The Girls, The Boys, and Chaos and Night. He also translated works by Malraux and Françoise Sagan.

The revision of the Scott Moncrieff translation of Proust's Remembrance of Things Past by Kilmartin was published in 1981. He compiled a comprehensive Reader's Guide to the Remembrance of Things Past (1983). The Guide comprises four separate indices: an index of characters in the Remembrance; an index of actual persons; an index of places; and an index of themes. The reader is thus enabled to locate almost any reference, such as Hector Berlioz, or The Arabian Nights, or Madame Verdurin in any particular scene or setting, or Versailles. The volume and page numbers are keyed to the 3-volume Remembrance of Things Past of 1981, translated by Scott Moncrieff and revised by Kilmartin. The Guide's volume and page references were revised for inclusion as "A Guide to Proust" in the 6-volume edition of the 1992 Moncrieff-Kilmartin-D. J. Enright translation newly entitled "In Search of Lost Time".
