= Philip Bainbrigge (died 1918) =

British poet, classicist and army officer

Philip Gillespie Bainbrigge
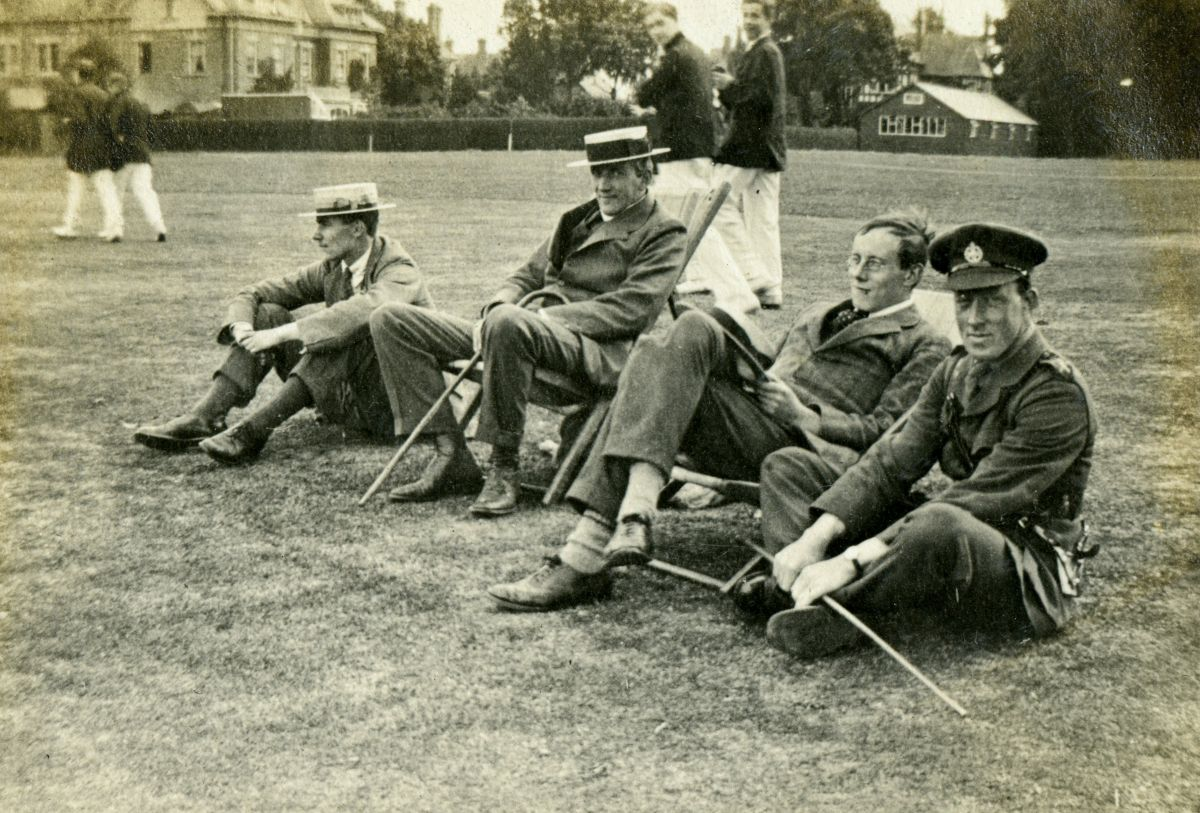
- Bainbrigge (second from right) with staff at Shrewsbury School in 1915
- Born: 19 September 1890
- Died: 18 September 1918 (aged 27); France
- Resting place: Five Points Cemetery, Léchelle, France
- Education: Eton College
- Alma mater: Trinity College, Cambridge
- Occupations: Classicist, schoolmaster
- Writing career
- Genre: Poetry
- Notable work: Achilles in Scyros
- Military career
- Allegiance: United Kingdom
- Branch: British Army
- Rank: Second lieutenant
- Unit: Lancashire Fusiliers
- Conflicts: First World War; Battle of Épehy

Philip Gillespie Bainbrigge (19 September 1890 – 18 September 1918) studied at Eton and had taken a first in classics at Trinity College, Cambridge. While he was an undergraduate at Trinity College he met C. K. Scott Moncrieff and became his friend and lover. From 1914, he became a classics master at Shrewsbury School.

In November 1917 during the Great War after learning of the death of two of his colleagues in Shrewsbury, and despite being nearly blind without his thick glasses, Bainbrigge enlisted in the army after memorizing the standard army's eye test. Bainbrigge attempted to enlist in the same regiment as Moncrieff, but failed and ended up in the Lancashire Fusiliers as a second lieutenant. Moncrieff would later refer Wilfred Owen to Bainbrigge who was stationed near Scarborough, North Yorkshire and the two would become friends. Bainbrigge died in action on 18 September 1918 in the Battle of Épehy, while leading a patrol over a sunken road where the enemy was hiding. Six weeks later, his friend Owen would be killed in action as well.

At the inaugural ceremony of the Shrewsbury School war memorial his lack of physical fitness and his courage were noted by describing him as "magnificently unsuited for war in everything except courage".

Bainbrigge was buried at Five Points Cemetery, Léchelle, France, in Grave B. 24.

He was among those named by J. B. Priestley as a "Cambridge Lost Generation"; the others being D.H.L. Baynes, Geoffrey Hopley, Donald Innes, Allan Parke, Francis Storrs, Geoffrey Tatham and James Woolston.

== Poems ==
Bainbrigge wrote a few homoerotic ballads, "mostly ballads of a private kind", as described by Moncrieff. He also wrote a verse play titled Achilles in Scyros, which was printed privately in 1927 with only 200 copies, one of which is in the British Library. In a parody of Rupert Brooke's The Soldier, Bainbridge wrote If I Should Die:

If I should die, be not concerned to know

The manner of my ending, if I fell

Leading a forlorn charge against the foe,

Strangled by gas, or shattered by a shell.

Nor seek to see me in this death-in-life

Mid shirks and curse, oaths and blood and sweat,

Cold in the darkness, on the edge of strife,

Bored and afraid, irresolute, and wet

But if you think of me, remember one

Who loved good dinners, curious parody,

Swimming, and lying naked in the sun,

Latin hexameters, and heraldry,

Athenian subtleties of δηs and ποιs,

Beethoven, Botticelli, beer, and boys.

— Philip Gillespie Bainbrigge, as published in Stand in the Trench, Achilles
