= Poème élégiaque =

- by Eugène Ysaÿe
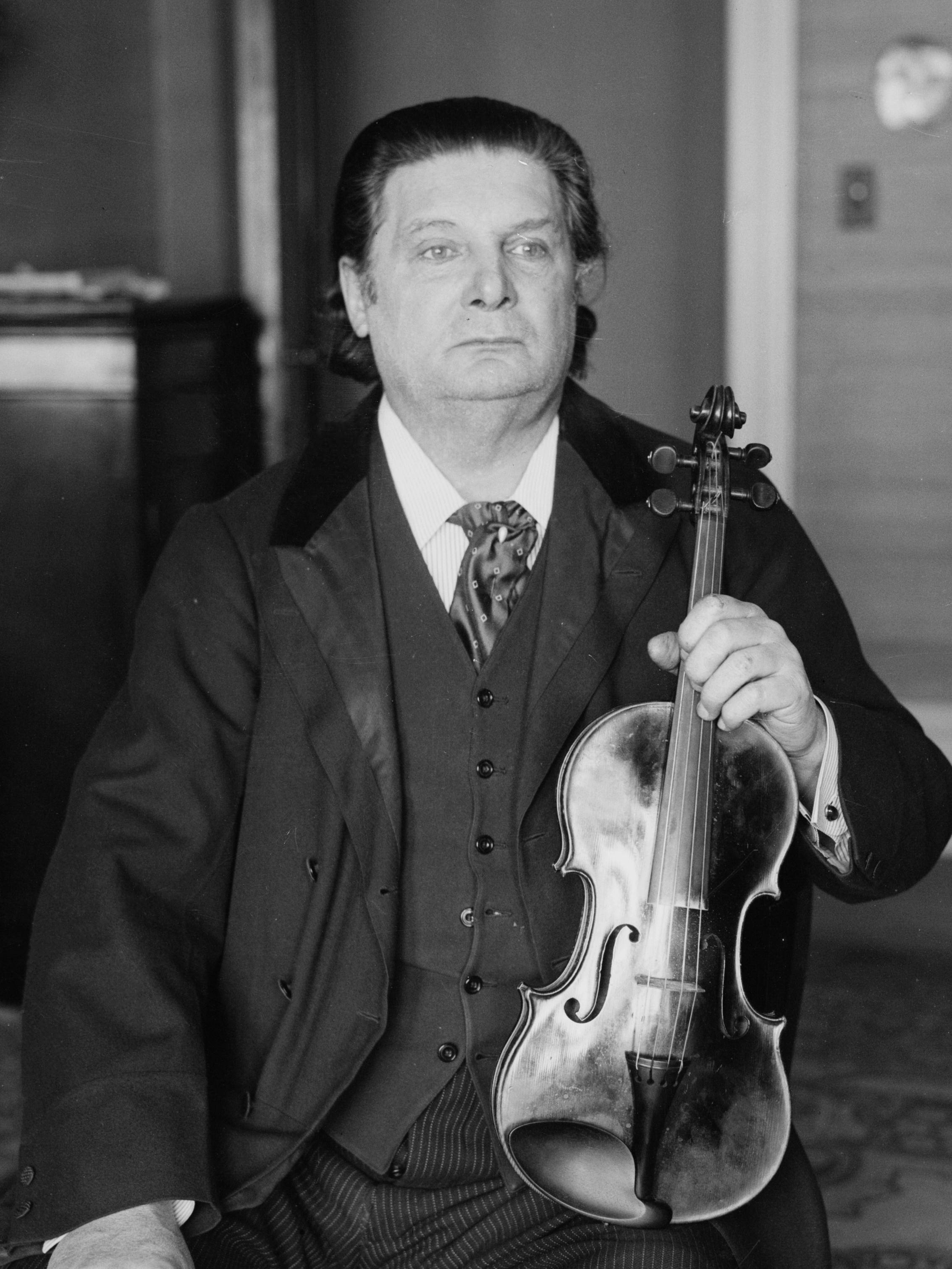
- Key: D minor
- Period: Romantic
- Genre: Poem
- Composed: 1893-1896
- Dedication: Gabriel Fauré
- Scoring: Solo violin (tuned FDAE), 2 flutes, 3 oboes (3rd doubling English horn), 3 clarinets (3rd doubling bass clarinet) 2 bassoons, 4 horns, 3 trumpets (3rd doubling piccolo trumpet) 3 trombones, 1 tuba, timpani, 2 percussion (cymbals and bass drum), harp, and strings

Poème élégiaque in D minor, Op. 12 for violin and orchestra (or piano) is the first of Eugène Ysaÿe's poems for string instruments and orchestra. The piece first took shape around 1892-1896 but achieved its final orchestrated form in 1902-1903. Dedicated to Gabriel Fauré, it served as an inspiration for Ernest Chausson's own Poème, Op. 25.

== The birth of Ysaÿe's poems ==
By the time of Ysaÿe's second stay in Paris around 1885, he had prided himself on having written several polonaises, mazurkas, and concertos without ever having taken harmony and musical composition lessons. He never stopped composing, even when his career as a traveling virtuoso gave him respite. However, from the 1890s on, Ysaÿe reflected on his youthful compositions and felt that they were devoid of any originality or value.

He then turned to the poem for string instruments, a genre in which it seems he created himself. Without any real formal constraints, this genre usually consists of a single movement, alternating different sections with clearly contrasted characters, sometimes melancholy, sometimes turbulent, but always of a basically lyrical nature (even sentimental at times). Combining aesthetic considerations and virtuosity, Ysaÿe's poems become a special place for the evocation of different images and emotions, without ever turning into program music. Ysaÿe had always been attracted to the 'poem' form and states himself that "it is more receptive to emotion and is not constrained by the restrictions imposed by the hallowed form of the concerto; it can be dramatic and lyrical; it is essentially romantic and impressionistic..." He continues by explaining that "(the poem) weeps and sings, it is shadow and light and has a changing prism; it is free and needs only its title to guide the composer and make him paint feelings, images, abstractions without a literary canvas; in a word, it is a picture painted without a model." To Ysaÿe, the poem is a progression in his musical writing and an experiment to associate musical interest with that of true and great virtuosity, which he felt had been neglected by instrumental players.

Throughout his life, Ysaÿe wrote nine poems: Poème élégiaque in D minor, Op. 12 for violin and orchestra; Au rotet, Op. 13 for violin and orchestra, Chant d'hiver in B minor, Op. 15 for violin and orchestra; Méditation, Op. 16 for cello and orchestra; Extase, Op. 21 for violin and orchestra; Les neiges d'antan, Op. 23 for violin and orchestra; Amitié, Op. 26 for two violins and orchestra, Poème nocturne, Op. 29 for violin, cello, and orchestra; Harmonies du soir, Op. 31 for string quartet and string orchestra.

He is also said to have composed a recently discovered Poème concertante for his pupil Irma Sèthe, in 1994.

== Poème élégiaque ==
This crucial work of Ysaÿe's, which ignited his passion for poem compositions, was inspired by Shakespeare's Romeo and Juliet. Ysaÿe builds on the virtuoso pieces of the 19th century and utilizes devices such as scordatura, in which the violin's lowest string is tuned down to give it a darker, warmer timbre. With this piece, Ysaÿe seems to have found his own voice, stating "I think that 'Poème élégiaque' marks a definite step in my work as a composer for it contains clear evidence of my desire to link music and virtuosity—the true virtuosity which had been neglected since the instrumentalists, departing from the example set them by the early masters, had ceased composing themselves and had left this art to those who ignored the resources of the violin."

The beginning of this piece, marked soutenu et calme, opens with a very lyrical theme from the solo violin in D minor which steadily gains in animation and attains a high degree of intensity. This section is a setting for the moment after Romeo and Juliet's death. Ysaÿe marks this with accents, syncopations, and a triple fortissimo.

Following the end of this introduction, a new theme in B-flat minor, is introduced. This section is titled Scène funèbre (funeral scene) and is solemn and deeply felt, to be played in a very sustained manner. The piece then becomes more agitated, with more syncopated rhythms and interplay between the violinist and orchestra. As the piece reaches its climax, the funeral theme returns, marked triple forte and this time played by the orchestra and violinist.

As the music settles, the final section begins with the superposition of both the opening theme and the funeral theme. As the piece ends, the violin plays sublime trills which can also be heard in Chausson's Poème.

Poème élégiaque shows a mixture of influences including elements of Wagner and the composers involved in the Société Nationale de Musique, such as Fauré, Franck, Saint-Saëns, Debussy, d’Indy, Chausson and Lekeu. This poem provided Ysaÿe with a new freedom of expression and is one of the absolute high points of the repertoire.
