= Vinteuil Sonata =

Fictional music work described by Marcel Proust

The Vinteuil Sonata is a fictional musical work described in the novel sequence In Search of Lost Time by Marcel Proust. The sonata features mainly in the section Un amour de Swann. The character Charles Swann associates a musical phrase in the piece with his love for Odette de Crécy. In the Scott Moncrieff translation (1922): "He found in the little phrase a mysterious and delicate meaning, but one which he could not understand."

The piece is heard again.

It was on one of those days that [Odette] happened to play for me the passage in Vinteuil's sonata that contained the little phrase of which Swann had been so fond. But often one hears nothing when one listens for the first time to a piece of music that is at all complicated ... For our memory, relatively to the complexity of the impressions which it has to face while we are listening, is infinitesimal, as brief as the memory of a man who in his sleep thinks of a thousand things and at once forgets them, or as that of a man in his second childhood who cannot recall a minute afterwards what one has just said to him...

Proust was interested in music's power to trigger involuntary memory, a term which he invented. The Vinteuil Sonata is thus comparable to the celebrated episode of the madeleine earlier in the novel, which triggers memories on the part of the narrator.

== The composer ==
In the context of the novel, the sonata is a contemporary work. The composer Vinteuil -- we do not learn his first name -- is one of Proust's characters. We learn that he is also the composer of a septet, and that his daughter is a lesbian.

== The sonata ==
The Vinteuil Sonata is identifiable as a violin sonata. Violin sonatas are today mostly described as being for violin and piano, but Proust preferred to list the instruments the other way round. In Proust's time, the naming of a violin sonata as for "piano and violin" was not unusual, as numerous contemporary examples demonstrate.

== Possible models for the sonata ==
The Vinteuil Sonata has a precursor in Proust's unfinished novel Jean Santeuil, written in the 1890s, but not published until after his death. Here the musical composition is not a fictional work, but the Violin Sonata No. 1 in D minor by Camille Saint-Saëns, which was written in 1885.

Proust was not a musician, but his description of the music is sufficiently detailed for comparisons to be made with various violin sonatas which the author is known to have heard. One relevant example is the Violin Sonata in A major by César Franck, which was written in 1886 as a wedding gift for the violinist Eugène Ysaÿe. Franck's themes reappear in different movements of the sonata which presents parallels to the Vinteuil Sonata. Neville Jason in his biography of Proust says that the author attended a performance of the Franck Sonata given by George Enescu. Afterwards he wrote enthusiastically about the concert to a friend and added a description of the Vinteuil Sonata to his draft of Swann's Way. Proust later wrote about Franck's sonata for violin and piano in the third part of À la recherche, Sodom et Gomorrhe.

Attention has also been drawn to a sonata by the lesser-known Guillaume Lekeu, who described his work as being for piano and violin rather than violin and piano.

In his 2015 book, André Vincens suggests that during a four-week honeymoon between Proust and the composer Reynaldo Hahn, the latter "played for his friend his Sonata in D minor, one phrase of which struck him so deeply that it would become not only the ‘national anthem of their relationship,’ but also the famous ‘little phrase of Vinteuil’ that accompanies the love affair between Swann and Odette in La Recherche."

French musicologist Georges Kan says it could be Johannes Brahms' Violin Sonata No. 2 in A major, Op. 100. He locates "the little phrase" at bar 89 in the last movement. This passage in F sharp minor appears three times, "quasi andante", and ends the piece. When Mme. Verdurin is crying "Just as though, 'in the Ninth', he said "we need only have the Finale", or "just the overture" of The Meistersingers one naturally thinks about Beethoven or Wagner, but it should be understood as Brahms' Ninth Sonata (Op. 100 is the ninth in chronology) dubbed "Meistersinger" for its Wagnerian accents, the finale of which is reminiscent of the overture to The Meistersingers. Georges Kan specifies that "a four-hand piano arrangement was available since 1887 at Simrock and Proust could have had some information about a coming issue of Paul Klengel's piano version".

Maria and Nathalia Milstein, concert musicians and sisters, made the case in 2017 that Gabriel Pierné’s Sonata for violin and piano in D minor, Opus 36, is the model for the sonata.

== "Creations" of the sonata ==
- Proust inspired French composer Claude Pascal in 1947 to write a sonata for violin and piano that "could have been" the sonata from Un amour de Swann.
- American composer Joseph Fennimore in 1978 wrote Swann in Love for violin and piano. Earlier, in 1976, he composed a Quartet after Vinteuil for clarinet, viola, cello and piano.
- David Graham, Hans Werner Henze, Gerd Kuhr and Marcel Wengler collaborated to compose their version of this sonata for the 1984 film Swann in Love.
- The Chilean composer Jorge Arriagada created his version of Vinteuil's violin sonata for Raoul Ruiz's 1999 film Le Temps retrouvé (Time Regained). There is a scene where it is played in a salon.
- Korean composer Sangin Lee wrote La petite phrase de Vinteuil for clarinet, horn, violin, viola, cello, double bass in 2018. This piece was commissioned by the Festival Pablo Casals.

== Possible link with the visual arts ==
The sonata is evoked for the reader partly through recording the emotional reactions to it. The achievement of Proust in describing something we cannot hear has been compared to the French Impressionists´ achievement in "making visible the invisible" through their brush-stokes. In particular, research has drawn attention to links with the work of Claude Monet.

== The sonata in concert programmes and recordings ==
The sonata has been used as a basis on which to build concert programmes, for example a concert in Madrid at the Fundación Juan March in 2017.

=== Recordings ===
- The Vinteuil Sonata

In 2017 an album of music related to Proust's work was released on the French label Mirare. Here it was suggested that the Violin Sonata Op. 36 by Gabriel Pierné could have been the model for Vinteuil's sonata.

- The Proust Album

In 2021 an album was released on Warner Classics featuring various performers including Pierre Fouchenneret (violin) and Shani Diluka (piano). A Hahn piece was labelled as the Vinteuil sonata.
