= Violin Sonata No. 2 (Brahms) =

1886 composition by Johannes Brahms

- Thun
- by Johannes Brahms
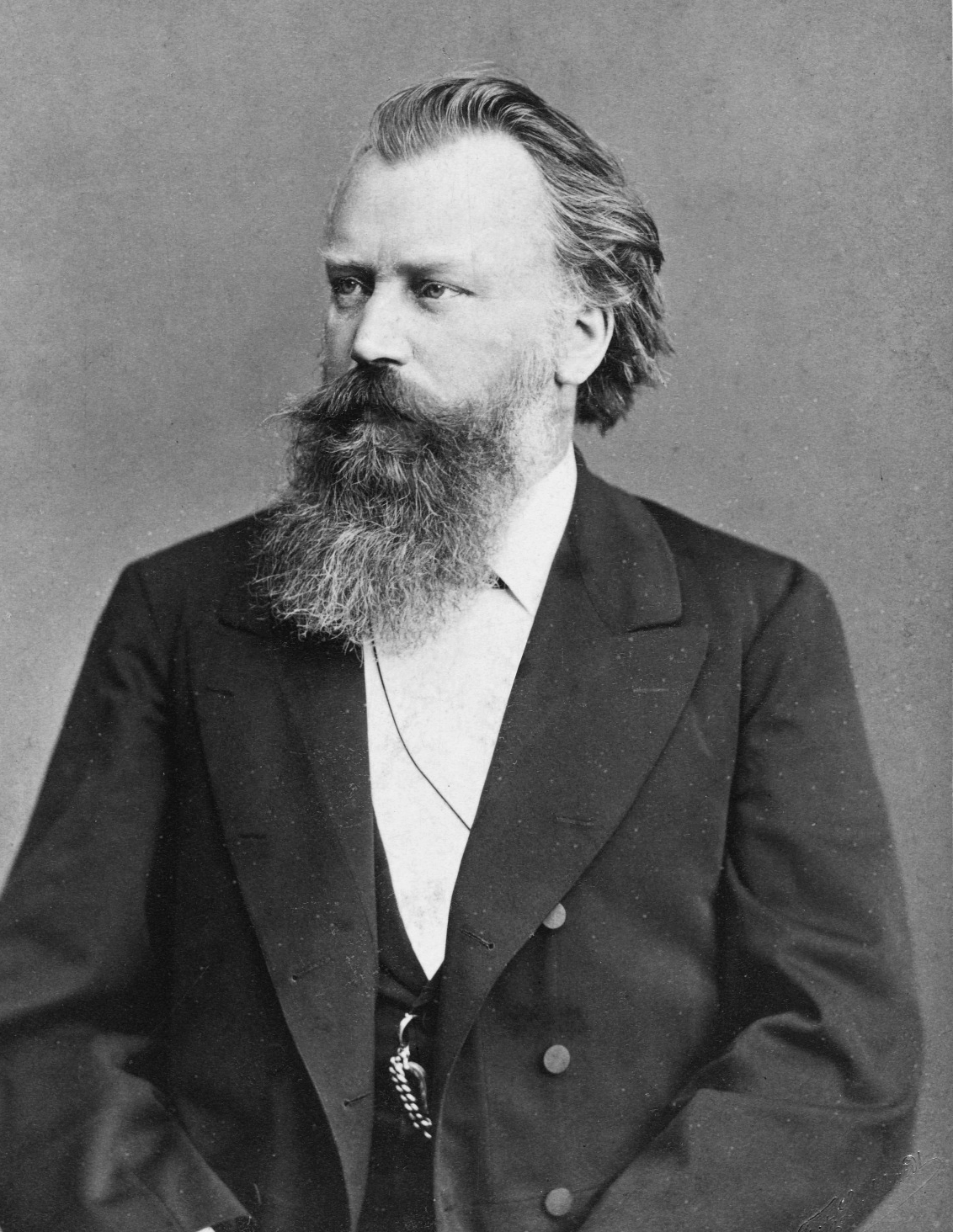
- The composer around 1885
- Other name: Meistersinger
- Key: A major
- Opus: 100
- Composed: 1886, Thun
- Performed: 2 December 1886: Vienna
- Movements: 3
- Scoring: Violin and Piano

The Violin Sonata No. 2 in A major, Op. 100 ("Thun" or "Meistersinger"), by Johannes Brahms, the second of three such works for violin and piano, was written while spending the summer of 1886 in Thun in the Bernese Oberland, Switzerland. It was first performed on 2 December 1886 in Vienna.

It was a very fertile and refreshing time for Brahms. His friend, the Swiss pastor and poet Josef Victor Widmann (1842–1911), lived in Bern and they visited each other. He was also visited by the poet Klaus Groth and the young German contralto Hermine Spies. Both Groth and Brahms were somewhat enamoured of Spies. He found himself so invigorated by the genial atmosphere and surroundings that he said the area was "so full of melodies that one has to be careful not to step on any". In a short space of time, he produced, in addition to this violin sonata, the Cello Sonata No. 2 in F major, Op. 99, the Piano Trio No. 3 in C minor, Op. 101, and various songs.

The second Violin Sonata is the shortest and is considered the most lyrical of Brahms's three violin sonatas. It is also considered the most difficult of the three to bring off successfully where virtuosity bows in the face of lyricism. It maintains a radiant, happy mood throughout.

== Movements ==
External audio
- Performed by Josef Suk and Julius Katchen
- I. Allegro amabile
- II. Andante tranquillo
- III. Allegretto grazioso (quasi andante)

The sonata consists of three movements, with the middle movement doing service as both a slow movement and a scherzo:

1. Allegro amabile (A major)
2. Andante tranquillo — Vivace — Andante — Vivace di più — Andante — Vivace (F major)
3. Allegretto grazioso (quasi andante) (A major)

== Commentary ==
By giving the work the formal title of "Sonata for Piano and Violin", rather than the more usual "Sonata for Violin and Piano", Brahms indicated the piano part was just as important as the violin part. In keeping with this, he allowed the piano to announce the opening theme. The first three notes of the first movement are very similar in both melody and harmony to the first three notes of "Walther's Prize Song" (Morgenlich leuchtend im rosigen Schein) from Richard Wagner's opera Die Meistersinger von Nürnberg. Although they were musical rivals, Brahms was a great admirer of Wagner's music, but whether this was a deliberate quotation on Brahms's part is open to speculation. Nevertheless, the sonata has often been subtitled the "Meistersinger" Sonata. It is also sometimes called the "Thun" Sonata from the place of its creation.

Motifs from three of the songs Brahms wrote that summer with Hermine Spies's voice in mind appear fleetingly in the sonata: "Wie Melodien zieht es mir leise durch den Sinn", Op. 105/1 ("Like melodies it steals softly through my mind"; words by Klaus Groth) makes an appearance in the second subject of the first movement. "Immer leiser wird mein Schlummer", Op. 105/2 ("Ever gentle is my slumber"; words by Hermann Lingg) and "Auf dem Kirchhofe", Op. 105/4 (words by Detlev von Liliencron) are quoted in the final movement. The song "Komm bald", Op. 97/5 ("Come soon"; words by Groth) is also said have provided thematic inspiration for the sonata.

An outstanding quotation of Brahms' own music can also be found at bar 89 in the last movement. Lied Meine liebe ist grün (Op. 63 no 5, poem by Felix Schumann, son of Robert and Clara, died in 1879) provides the dramatic portion of its melody corresponding to die glänzt wohl herab auf den Fliederbusch lyrics ('which gleams down on the lilac bush').

For French musicologist Georges Kan, this is the location of the little phrase in Vinteuil Sonata which Swann listens to in 'In Search of Lost Time' by Marcel Proust.

The Violin Sonata No. 2 was premiered in Vienna on 2 December 1886 by the violinist Joseph Hellmesberger and Brahms himself at the piano.

Brahms's friend the poet Josef Widmann later wrote a poem to be accompanied by the sonata.

== Recordings ==
Year	Piano	Violin	Label	Remarks
1990	Daniel Barenboim	Itzhak Perlman	Sony	
1985	Vladimir Ashkenazy	Itzhak Perlman	Warner	
1960	Arthur Rubinstein	Henryk Szeryng		
1962		Yehudi Menuhin		
1948	Georg Solti	Georg Kulenkampff	Decca	
2009	Lambert Orkis	Anne-Sophie Mutter	Deutsche Grammophon	
1983	Alexis Weissenberg	Anne-Sophie Mutter	Warner	
1993	Yefim Bronfman	Isaac Stern	Sony	
1972		Jascha Heifetz	RCA	
1991	Maria João Pires	Augustin Dumay	Deutsche Grammophon	
1975	György Sebők	Arthur Grumiaux	Philips	
1990	Pascal Rogé	Pierre Amoyal	Decca	
1997	Peter Frankl	Kyung-Wha Chung	Warner	
2005	Nicholas Angelich	Renaud Capuçon		
1998		Ruggiero Ricci		
2015	Alexander Melnikov	Isabelle Faust	Harmonia mundi	
2013	Yuja Wang	Leonidas Kavakos	Decca	
1967	Julius Katchen	Josef Suk	Decca	
1960	Carl Seemann	Wolfgang Schneiderhan	Deutsche Grammophon	
2001		Zino Francescatti	Sony	
1995	Piotr Anderszewski	Viktoria Mullova	Philips	
2017		Nathan Milstein		
1991		Maxim Vengerov	Teldec	
1955	Andrei Mytnik	Leonid Kogan		
1997	Roland Pöntinen	Ulf Wallin	Arte Nova	
2019	Éric le Sage	Pierre Fouchenneret		
2015	Lars Vogt	Christian Tetzlaff	Ondine	
1996	Peter Serkin	Pamela Frank	Decca	
2018		Tasmin Little	Chandos	
2002	Frederic Chiu	Pierre Amoyal		
2011		Arabella Steinbacher	PentaTone	
2002		Ilya Kaler	Naxos	
1988		Nils-Erik Sparf	BIS	
2015		Szenthelyi Miklós	Hungaroton	
1974	Daniel Barenboim	Pinchas Zukerman	Deutsche Grammophon	
	Sviatoslav Richter	David Oistrakh	Melodiya	
1987	Valery Afanassiev	Gidon Kremer	Deutsche Grammophon	
1968	Pierre Barbizet	Christian Ferras	Deutsche Grammophon	
2011	Gary Graffman	Berl Senofsky		
2019	Nicholas Angelich	Akiko Suwanai		
2014	Louise Lortie	Augustin Dumay	Onyx	
1932	Rudolf Serkin	Adolf Busch	HMV	
2019	Cédric Tiberghien	Alina Ibragimova	Hyperion	
