= Muse (person) =

Person who inspires the creation of achievement or work

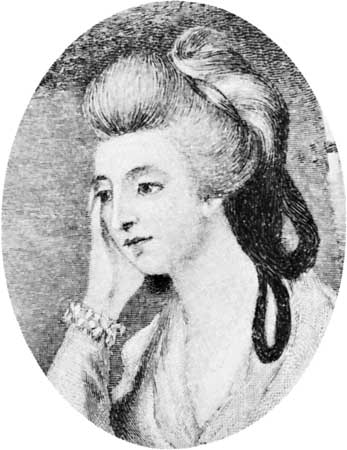
Charlotte von Stein, Johann Wolfgang von Goethe's close friend and model for Iphigenia in Iphigenia in Tauris and Natalie in Wilhelm Meister's Apprenticeship and Wilhelm Meister's Journeyman Years

A muse is a person who provides creative inspiration to a person of the arts (such as a writer, artist, composer, and so on). In the course of history, these have usually (but not necessarily) been women. The term is derived from the Muses, nine ancient Greek goddesses of inspiration.

Human muses are woven throughout history. In modern times, specific people are called muses; as a rule, these are close friends and sometimes lovers or spouses, who inspire or affect the works of an artist due to their disposition, charisma, wisdom, sophistication, eroticism, intimate friendship, or other traits. Sometimes muses directly provide models for specific paintings and sculptures and for characters in literary works, but sometimes not, rather providing inspiration for the artist's work as a whole.

Muses are distinct from persons who may organize, teach, befriend, marry or support artists without providing inspiration for their works. Persons who serve only as models for paintings or sculptures are not necessarily muses (although they may be).

Modern muses who have left a noticeable mark on the history of culture include Regine Olsen (for Søren Kierkegaard), Fanny Brawne (for John Keats), Varvara Bakhmeteva (for Mikhail Lermontov), Elizabeth Siddal (for the Pre-Raphaelite Brotherhood), Camille Claudel (for Auguste Rodin), Leila Waddell (for Aleister Crowley), Gala (for Salvador Dalí), Dora Maar (for Pablo Picasso), Aline Bernstein (for Thomas Wolfe), Yoko Ono (for John Lennon), Pattie Boyd (for Eric Clapton and George Harrison), Uma Thurman (for Quentin Tarantino), Annabelle Neilson (for Alexander McQueen and John Galliano), Victorine Meurent, Grace Jones (for Jean-Paul Goude), Méry Laurent (for Édouard Manet and others), and many others. Muses are sometimes artists in their own right (as with Meurent, Siddal, Claudel, Ono, Maar, Jones, and Thurman).
