= Zalkind =

Zalkind or Salkind (Russian: Залкинд) is a name for

- Alexander Salkind (1887–1940), Austrian journalist
- Alexander Michailowitsch Salkind (1921–1997), film producer
- Alexander Veniaminovich Zalkind (1866–1931), Russian medician
- Alvin J. Salkind (1927–2015), American chemical engineer
- Aron Borissovich Zalkind (1888–1936), Soviet psychoanalyst
- Ber Zalkind (1878–1944), Lithuanian painter
- Evgeny Mikhailovich Zalkind (1912–1980), Russian historian und orientalist
- Ilya Alexandrovich Salkind (born 1947), film producer
- Ivan Abramovich Zalkind (1885–1928), Soviet diplomat
- Lazar Borisovich Zalkind (1886–1945), Soviet chess composer
- Michael Yakovlevich Salkind (1890–1974), film producer
- Milton Zalkind (1916–1998), US-American pianist
- Morton Salkind (1932–2014), American politician
- Rosalia Zemlyachka Salkind (1876–1947), Soviet politician
- Solomon Salkind (1802–1868), Lithuanian Hebrew poet and educator
- Solomon Zalkind Minor (1826–1900), Lithuanian-Russian rabbi and writer
- Semyon Ilyich Zalkind (1879–1940), Soviet politician
- Semyon Rafailovich Zalkind (1869–1941), Russian medician
- Semyon Yakovlevich Zalkind (1903–1976), Soviet biologist
- Shneur Zalkind (1887–1959), Jewish poet
- Vera Salkind alias Véra Flory (born 1907), French actress
- Yankev-Meyer Zalkind (1875–1937), British rabbi

== See also ==
- Zalkind Hourwitz (1751–1812), Polish emigrant in France
- Mischa Salkind-Pearl, American composer, keyboardist and educator
