= Irma Sèthe =

Belgian violinist

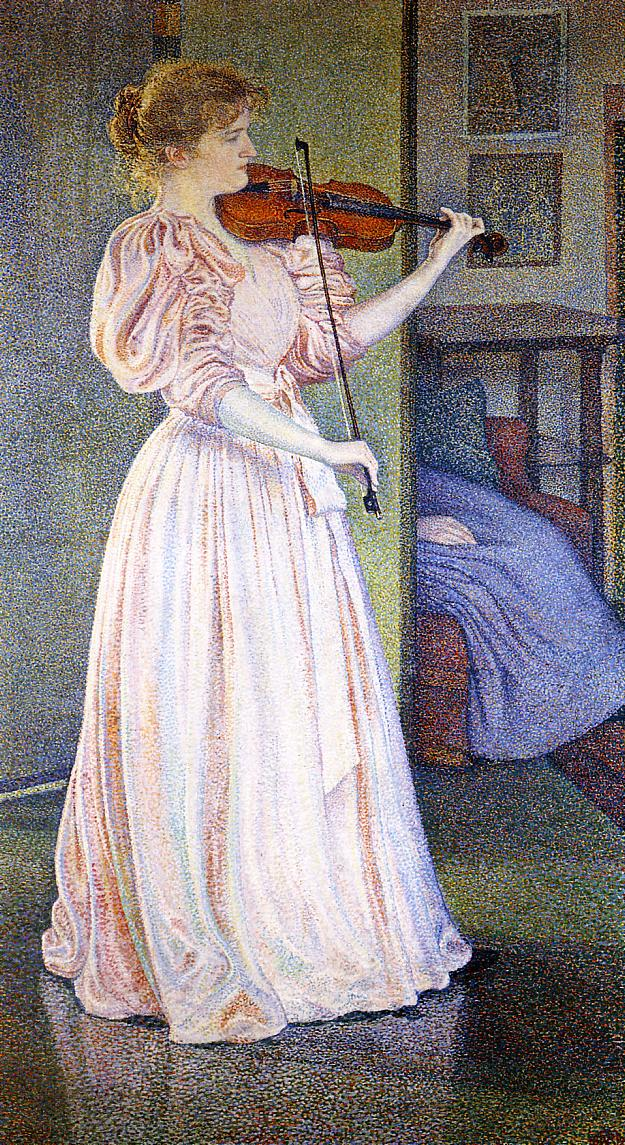
- Portrait of Irma Sèthe by Theo Van Rysselberghe

Background information
- Born: 27 April 1876
- Origin: Bruxelles, Belgium
- Died: 12 May 1958 (aged 82)
- Occupation(s): Violinist and pedagogue

Irma Sèthe (April 27, 1876, in Brussels – May 12, 1958, in New York City) was a Belgian violinist and pedagogue.

== Biography ==
=== Youth and learning ===
Irma Sèthe was the daughter of Gérard Sèthe (1827-1893), a textile merchant, and Louise Frédérique Seyberth (1847-1923). She had two older sisters: Maria (1867-1943), who married the Belgian architect Henry van de Velde in 1894, and Alice, who married the Belgian sculptor Paul Du Bois. Irma also had a younger brother, Walter (1878-1937), an engineer.

Irma Sèthe was introduced to the world of music by her mother at an early age, and at the age of five she began her apprenticeship with Ottomar Jokisch (1841-1901). During the summer of 1885, the young girl continued her violin training with the German violinist August Wilhelmj.

=== Musical training ===
On September 23, 1890, Irma Sèthe was admitted to the Royal Conservatory of Brussels, where she joined Eugène Ysaÿe's advanced violin class, and where she also took harmony lessons from Gustave Huberti and instrumental ensemble lessons from Jean-Baptiste Colyns (1834-1902). On May 6, 1891, Eugène Ysaÿe invited her to perform with him at St. James's Hall in London in works by Felix Mendelssohn, Piotr Ilitch Tchaikovsky and Henryk Wieniawski. Two months later, in early July 1891, Irma was awarded the first prize in violin at the age of 15. Among her friends at the time were the Belgians Guillaume Lekeu and Mathieu Crickboom, with whom she performed in concert. Although the register of students indicates that she left the Conservatoire in September 1891, it seems that she remained at the institution for a longer period of time, helping some of Eugène Ysaÿe's students in their training until 1894. That same year marked the departure of Ysaÿe for his first American tour but also the end of his love affair with Irma Sèthe. Before the separation, he composed his Poème concertant for her, while Théo Van Rysselberghe painted her in a famous portrait. In a letter to Irma, Ysaÿe writes: "I find that this Poème is 'ours', that this music tells the passionate drama that is being played out here, at this hour; [...] Yes, I feel that no work I will ever write will tell this bitter chapter of my existence better than this one!"

=== Career ===
In 1898, Irma Sèthe moved to Berlin with her husband, the Russian philosopher, journalist, writer and diplomat Samuel Saenger (1864-1944), and played in the Berlin Philharmonic Orchestra. That same year, she gave birth to her first daughter, Elisabeth (1898-1990). Her second daughter, Magdalene (1907-1991), was born nine years later, in August 1907.

In 1909, Irma Sèthe was a member of the Berliner Kammerspiel-Trio with the pianist Walther Lampe (1872-1964) and the cellist Otto Urack (1884-1963). At the same time, the violinist gives private violin lessons.

During the period 1894 to 1911, she collaborated with many artists: Marguerite Swale, Gustav Ernest, Alfred Reisenauer, Paul Ludwig, George Henschel, Henry Bird, Eleanor King, Louis Hillier, Waldemar Lütschg and Erna Klein.

On March 12, 1897, Louis Hillier accompanied her on the piano at St. James Hall in London, notably in his piece Serpentine which he dedicated to her.

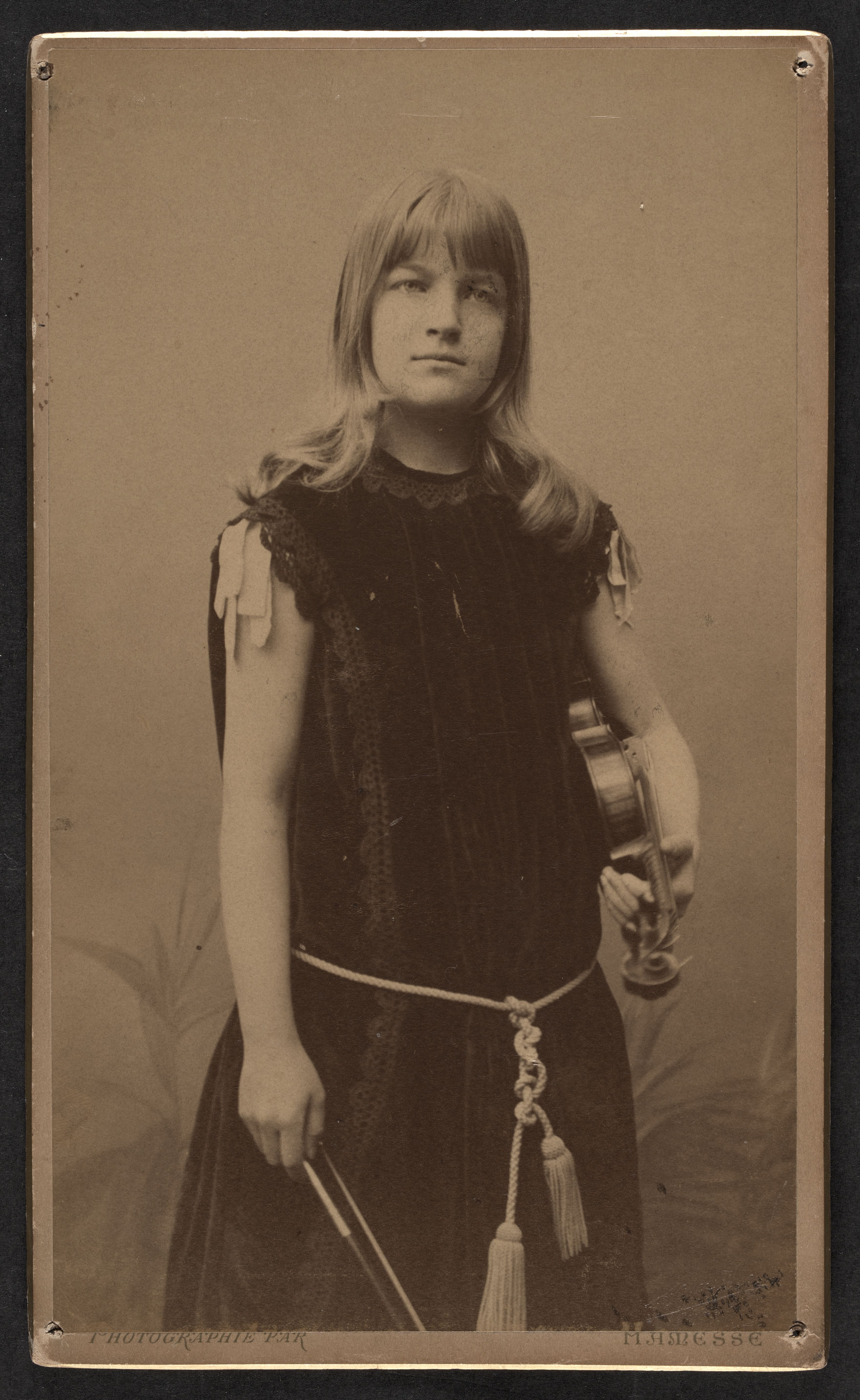
Irma Sèthe photographed by Adolphe Hamesse.

Irma Sèthe stopped performing in public at the beginning of the World War I. After the war, she moved briefly to Prague with her husband. In 1922, the couple returned to Berlin, where they remained until World War II. In 1939, the Saenger-Sèthe couple fled Europe for the United States, taking a boat in Lisbon to reach New York on March 26, 1941, where they joined their youngest daughter Magdalene.

After the death of her husband in 1944, Irma Sèthe experienced a difficult exile and gradually fell into madness. Living with her eldest daughter Elisabeth in New York, she died at the age of 82, leaving among her personal belongings her child's half violin, which became part of the collections of the Royal Library of Belgium in June 2022.

== Bibliography ==
=== Articles ===
- Volker Timmermann, Saenger-Sethe, Irma, Sophie Drinker Institut für muzikwissenschaftliche Frauen-und Geschlechterforschung, 2016.
- Silke Wenzel, Irma Saenger-Sethe, Musik und Gender im Internet, 2017.

=== Books ===
- Marie Cornaz, À la redécouverte d'Eugène Ysaÿe, Turnhout, Brepols, 2019 (pp. 60–92, 286, 310).

== See also ==
- Portrait of Irma Sèthe by Théo van Rysselberghe.
