= Swann in Love =

Swann in Love may refer to:

- Swann in Love (novella). In the original French this work is known as Un amour de Swann. It is a section of the novel sequence In Search of Lost Time by Marcel Proust.
- Swann in Love, a film based on the book
