= Portrait of Irma Sèthe =

Painting by Théo van Rysselberghe

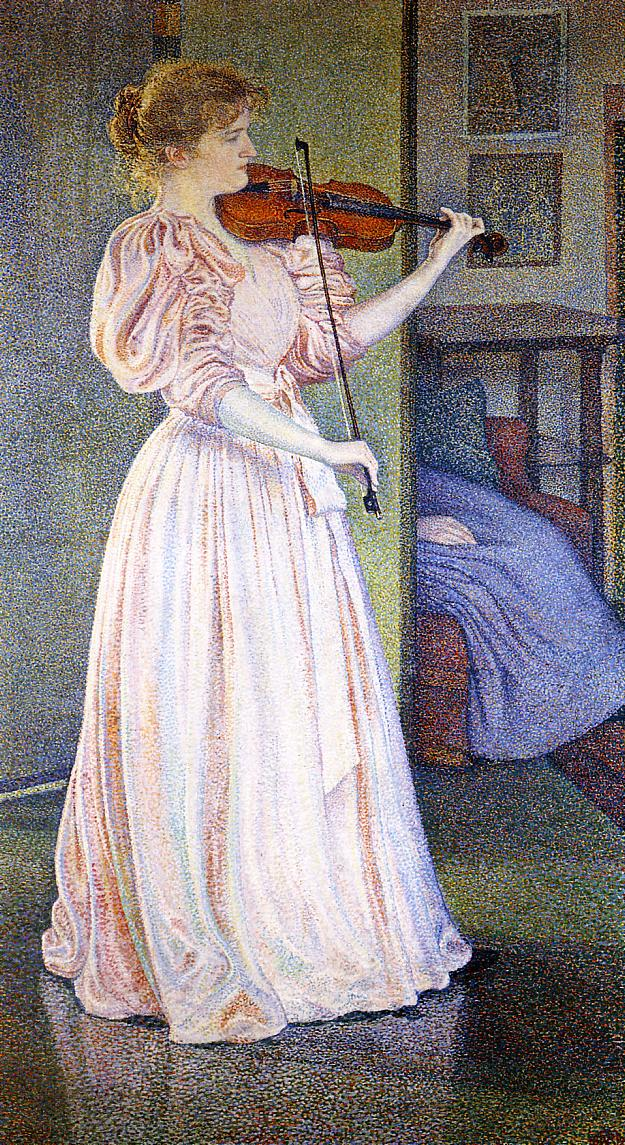
- Artist: Théo van Rysselberghe
- Year: 1894
- Medium: Oil on canvas
- Dimensions: 197 cm × 114.5 cm (77.5 in × 45 in)
- Location: Petit Palais, Geneve

Portrait of Irma Sèthe is an oil on canvas painting by the Belgian neo-impressionist painter Théo van Rysselberghe. The work is a portrait, painted in pointillist style, of the violin-playing Irma Sèthe, one of the heiresses of a musical family from Brussels with whom the painter was close. The work is now in the private collection of the Musée du Petit Palais in Geneva.

== Context ==
In 1884 Van Rysselberghe was one of the founders of the avant-garde society of Les XX. Members of the group initially focused on Impressionism, but under the influence of Georges Seurat and Paul Signac, several of its members moved on, with many of them embracing Seurat's Pointillism. While Van Rysselberghe was not the first member of Les XX to produce work based on the guidelines set by Seurat, he nevertheless ended up with being to most committed to the latter, sticking with divisionism for the rest of his career. Today, Van Rysselberghe is considered one of the greatest Neo-Impressionists of the 19th century.

Van Rysselberghe had previously mainly studied the old masters in search of solutions for the representation of light effects. He found a suitable solution after his acquaintance with Seurat, in the technique of the Divisionists.

In his Mademoiselle Alice Sèthe (1888) Van Rysselbergeh combined avant-garde technique with the Dutch realist approach, to show both the financial status of the Sèthe family and their passion for music. In the Portrait of Irma Sèthe (who was Alice's sister) Van Rysselberghe cemented his newly discovered style.

== Painting ==
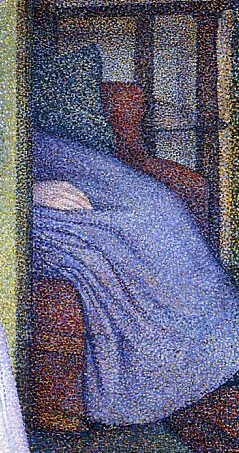
Detail of unidentified individual

The Sèthe family from Brussels belonged to Van Rysselberghe's circle of friends. Van Rysselberghe portrayed the Sèthe daughters, Irma, Maria (the wife of Henry Van de Velde) and Alice (wife of sculptor Paul Dubois) on several occasions.

Portrait of Irma Sèthe depicts Irma playing the violin. Making music played an important role in the Sèthe family. Maria played the harmonium and Irma was apprenticed to the "King of the Violin" Eugène Ysaÿe, a violinist and teacher at the Royal Conservatory of Brussels.

Van Rysselberghe portrayed Irma Sèthe completely immersed in playing the violin. Attention is focused on her. However, Irma is not alone: in the room next to her there sits another woman. The depiction of this second, partly concealed figure gives the painting some tension. It raises the question of who she is, what is she doing, and why is she behind the door.

The Portrait of Irma Sèthe typifies Van Rysselberghe's pointillism. The satin of Irma's dress lights up in full pink, composed of thousands of dots of unmixed colors. The changing light and color effects create a strong plastic effect over the folds on Irma's sleeves and skirt.

Van Rysselberghe made a great impression on his fellow painters with his Portrait of Irma Sèthe, especially on Paul Signac, who described it in his diary as "extraordinarily delicate." The portrait was exhibited in 1895 at the Paris Salon des Indépendants, in 1898 at the salon of La Libre Esthétique, and in 1899 at the thirteenth exhibition of the Vienna Secession. It established Van Rysselberghe's name in Europe as a prominent pointillist painter. Van Rysselberghe was one of the few pointillists who primarily focused on portraiture. While many of his Belgian colleagues later switched to fauvism, he remained faithful to his divisionist technique.

== Sources ==
- Anna Benthues, Rolf Schneider e.a.: De 100 mooiste vrouwen uit de schilderkunst. Rebo, Lisse, 2007. ISBN 9789036620239
