= Jonny Heykens =

Dutch composer (1884–1945)

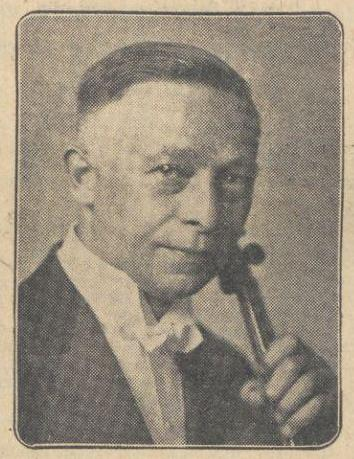
Jonny Heykens (1932)

Jonny Heykens, Johannes Jacobus Heijkens (24 September 1884 – 28 June 1945) was a Dutch composer of light classical music, best known for his jaunty Ständchen (Serenade) No.1 Opus 21.

Heykens was born at Groningen, Netherlands. He was taught violin by Eugène Ysaÿe at the Brussels Conservatory. He played in various orchestras before founding his own orchestra in Groningen in 1914. After the First World War, he toured Europe and achieved immense popularity, especially in Germany. Heykens composed pieces for his orchestra, in addition to songs and musical comedies. His records sold widely. In the Second World War, he continued touring throughout Europe. He joined the NSB, the fascist National Socialist Party of the Netherlands. He expressed racist opinions about Jews and black people and he performed at the parties of important Nazi officials. Resistance groups broadcast his famous tune with words: Sells his people and homeland for six loose cents. After the war, Heykens was arrested as a suspected collaborator. He died in prison in Hilversum several weeks later.

In Japan the Serenade became a popular song, and so it was selected in 1943 by NHK, The Broadcasting Corporation of Japan as the signature tune of "The Evening Show for the Front Line", a radio programme to entertain serving Japanese soldiers and sailors, in spite of strenuous government efforts to dispense with Western cultural influences. After WWII, Japanese National Railways (JNR) chose part of the serenade for use in its passenger cars. It is still used on several Japan Railway (JR) trains.

Heykens' Serenade was also used during the 1940s, by Albert Sandler as the signature tune for the BBC Sunday evening radio programme "The Palm Court Orchestra at the Grand Hotel." In Germany, Heykens Serenade is the music to Loriot's comedy sketch "Schmeckt's?"

The serenade is also used as background music in English listening tests in college entrance examinations in China.

== In popular culture ==
A 1976 barrel organ recording of Heykens’ classic carousel song Ständchen (Serenade) by the C. John Mears Organisation is prominently featured in popular Atari Interactive video game RollerCoaster Tycoon. The English yodeller Harry Torrani (Harry Hopkinson) recorded the song on Regal Zonophone MR 2982 backed with The Cuckoo Waltz. Torrani is almost forgotten in the UK now but retains almost legendary status in Australian country music circles, where he was a huge influence on local artists.
