= Fünf Lieder, Op. 105 (Brahms) =

Compositions by Johannes Brahms

Fünf Lieder
- für eine tiefere Stimme und Klavier
- by Johannes Brahms
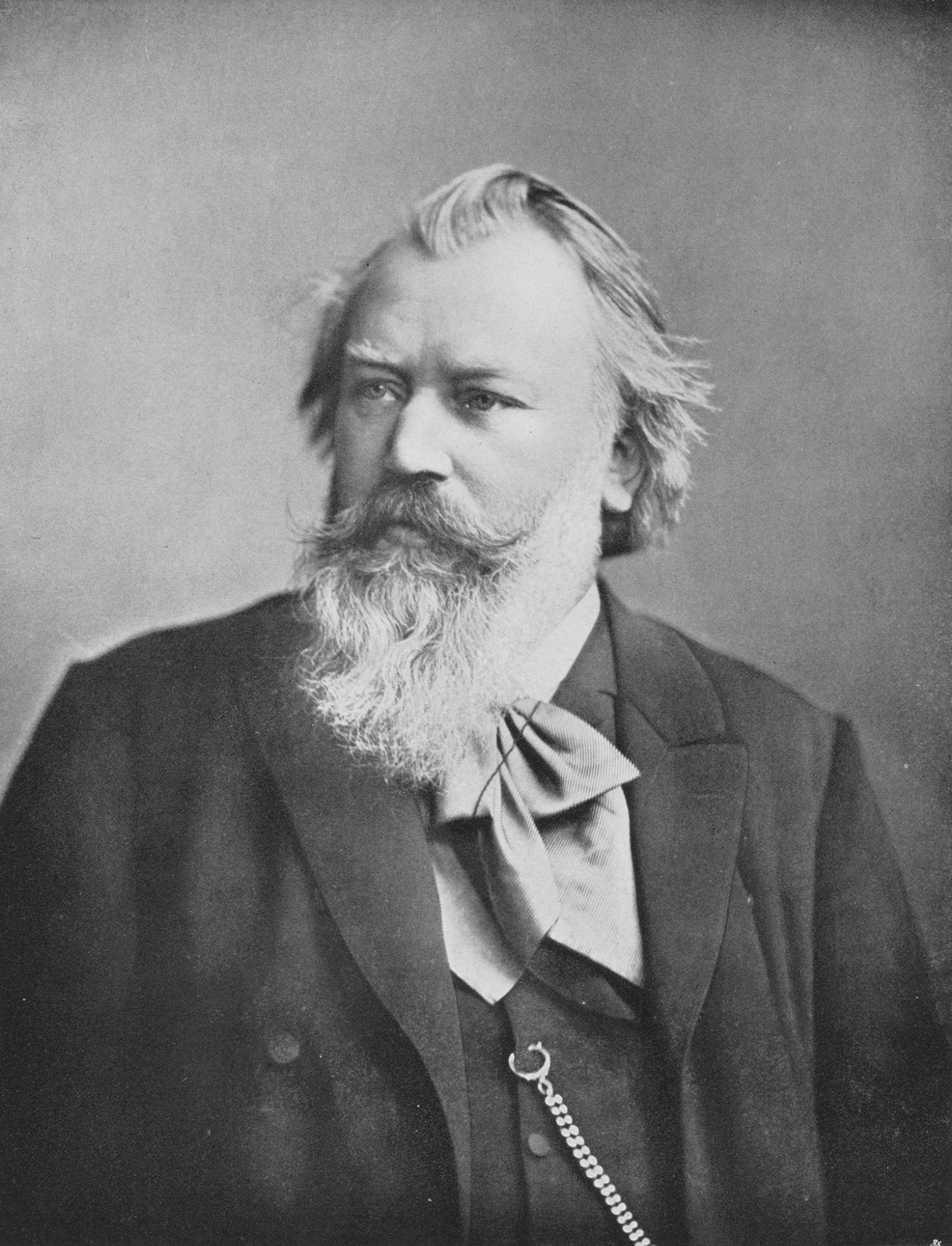
- The composer around 1885
- Opus: 105
- Text: by Klaus Groth, Hermann Lingg, Detlev von Liliencron and Carl von Lemcke, and a traditional
- Language: German
- Composed: 1886–1888
- Published: 1888
- Movements: five
- Scoring: lower voice; piano

Fünf Lieder (Five Songs), Op. 105, were composed by Johannes Brahms between 1886 and 1888. He set five poems by different authors, mostly contemporary poets, for a lower voice and piano. Simrock published the work in 1888.

== History ==
Brahms recorded in a pocket diary entry written in Thun, Switzerland, in August 1886, that he had set several poems to music, including Klaus Groth's "Wie Melodien zieht es mir leise durch den Sinn" (Like melodies it steals softly through my mind), Hermann Lingg's "Immer leiser wird mein Schlummer" (Ever quieter grows my slumber), Carl von Lemcke's "Verrat / Ich stand in einer lauen Nacht" (Betrayal / I stood in one balmy night) and another song by Paul Flemming, all of them authors from the 19th century. He probably composed the songs with the voice of Hermine Spies in mind, who privately sang some of them for him.

Two years later, Brahms offered a group of songs for lower voice to his publisher Simrock, to be his Op. 105, together with a group for high voice as Op. 106. The final grouping and order was achieved in a personal meeting of the composer and the publisher, ultimately adding to Op. 105 a setting of a traditional Lower Rhenish song, "Feins Liebchen, trau du nicht" (Beloved, do not trust) and a poem by Detlev von Liliencron, "Auf dem Kirchhofe / Der Tag ging regenschwer und sturmbewegt" (At the graveyard / "The day was heavy with rain and storms"):

1. "Wie Melodien zieht es mir leise durch den Sinn" (Groth)
2. "Immer leiser wird mein Schlummer" (Lingg)
3. "Feins Liebchen, trau du nicht" (traditional)
4. "Der Tag ging regenschwer" (Liliencron)
5. "Ich stand in einer lauen Nacht" (Lemcke)

The group, as others by Brahms, has been metaphorically described as a "song bouquet", likening it to flowers "plucked" from different sources and then combined into a whole. The songs were premiered individually, the first song on 11 February 1887 in Vienna, the second at a recital of Amalie Joachim in Berlin on 1 February 1888, the third on 6 March 1888 in Vienna, the fourth on 30 November 1888 there, and the fifth also there on 5 December 1888, in a concert of Olga Segel. Later performances and recordings also often ignored the published grouping, placing individual songs in different contexts.

The melodies of some of these songs also make appearances in Brahms' instrumental works, especially "Immer leiser wird mein Schlummer", which he had used a few years earlier as a cello solo theme in the third movement of his Piano Concerto No. 2 in B♭ major. Motifs from three of the songs appear in his Violin Sonata No. 2, "Wie Melodien zieht es mir leise durch den Sinn" as the second subject of the first movement, and both "Immer leiser wird mein Schlummer" and "Auf dem Kirchhofe" in the final movement.
