= Carl von Lemcke =

German aesthetician and art historian

Carl von Lemcke Karl (von) Lemcke
- Born: 26 August 1831; Schwerin, Germany
- Died: 7 April 1913 (aged 81)
- Occupations: German aesthetician and art historian

Carl von Lemcke, or Karl (von) Lemcke, who sometimes wrote as Karl Manno (26 August 1831 – 7 April 1913) was a German aesthetician and art historian who also wrote songs and novels.

He was born in Schwerin. Between 1852 and 1856, he studied art history and philosophy at the University of Göttingen, where he became member of Burschenschaft Hannovera (fraternity), the Ludwig-Maximilians-Universität München, and finally at Heidelberg University, where he obtained his doctorate in 1856. He then studied and worked at the Friedrich Wilhelm University of Berlin, the University of Paris and the Ludwig-Maximilians-Universität München before returning to Heidelberg University. There, Lemcke obtained his habilitation in 1862 with his book Zur Einleitung in die Ästhetik ("An Introduction to Aesthetics"). He taught German literature, aesthetics, and history for five years before being appointed associate professor. The frequently-translated Populäre Ästhetik dates from those years.

In 1871, Lemcke moved to the Ludwig-Maximilians-Universität München and joined the Munich circle of writers Die Krokodile, taking the nickname "Hyena." Just two years later, he accepted a position at the Rijksakademie van Beeldende Kunsten in Amsterdam, where he was given a full professorship of aesthetics and art history. After the establishment of a chair in 1870 at the Polytechnikum Aachen, Lemcke moved to Aachen in 1876, where he was the first professor of art history and general aesthetics. Here, another important piece was created for his series on the history of German poetry, From Opitz to Klopstock, as well as numerous biographies and monographs, especially on Dutch painters, for Robert Dohme's Kunst und Künstler and the Allgemeine Deutsche Biographie.

Finally, he moved in 1885 to the University of Stuttgart, where in the same position as Wilhelm Lübke he worked until his retirement in 1903. From 1892 to 1895, he succeeded Jakob Johann Weyrauch as rector of the university and at the same time became the temporary director of the Museum of Fine Arts, now the State Gallery in Stuttgart. In this role, Lemcke advocated realism as exemplified by Dutch painting and contemporary art. He was responsible for the museum's purchase of a larger collection of paintings by the impressionist Christian Landenberger.

Ever after his stay in Munich, Lemcke was a sought-after writer of lyrics for major composers of his time such as, for example, Johannes Brahms who set his poem "Verrat" as No. 5 of his Fünf Lieder, Op. 105, Joseph Rheinberger, and Anton Rubinstein. Lemcke also wrote novels under the pseudonym Karl Manno.

He spent his retirement quietly and died in Munich.

== Selected works ==
- Zur Einleitung in die Aesthetik, Habilitation, Universität Heidelberg, 1862
- Populäre Ästhetik, E. A. Seemann, Leipzig 1865 GoogleBooks
- Von Opitz bis Klopstock, Leipzig, E. A. Seemann, 1882, Neue Ausgabe des ersten Bandes v. Lemckes Geschichte der deutschen Dichtung. Text über Carl von Lemcke auf Wikisource
- Ästhetik in gemeinverständlichem Vortrag / Bd. 1. Begriff u. Wesen d. Ästhetik u. a., / Bd. 2. Dt. Kunst, 1890, 6. aufs Neue durchgearbeitete und verbesserte. Auflage
- Novels, as Karl Manno:
  - Beowulf, Berlin 1882, 3 vols
  - Ein süßer Knabe, Berlin 1885
  - Gräfin Gerhild, Stuttgart 1892
  - Jugendgenossen Berlin, 1898, 3 vols
