= Georges Kan =

French musicologist, music publisher and composer

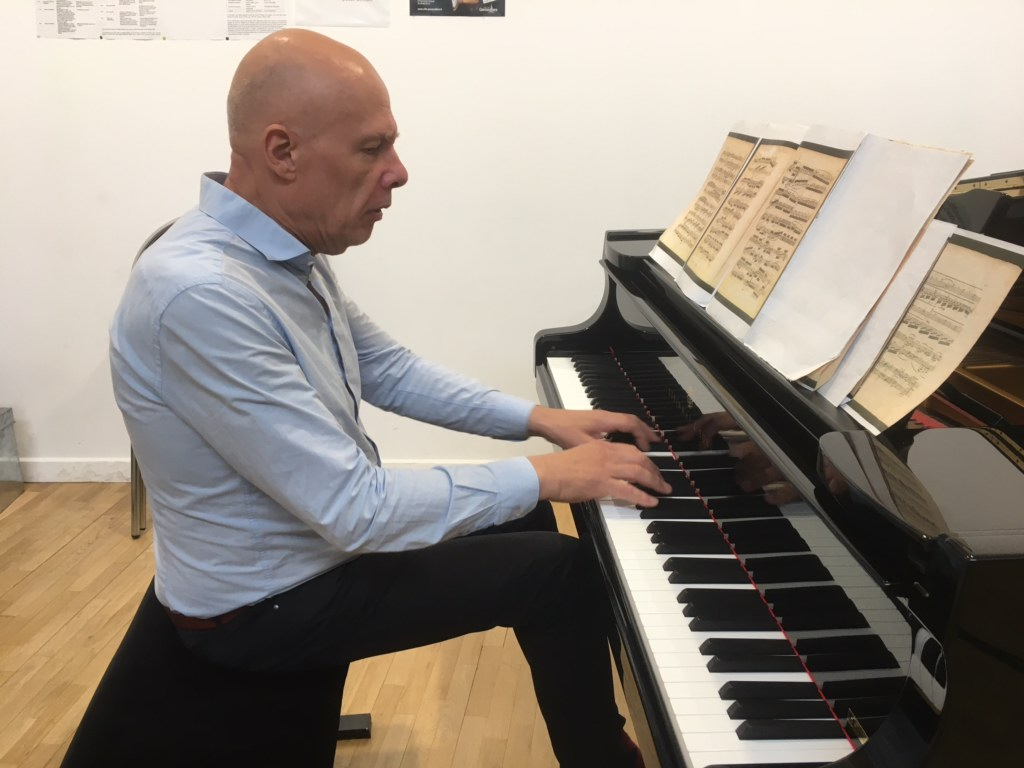
Georges Kan

Georges Kan (born in 1958) is a French musicologist, music publisher and composer. Kan has written several articles, notably for the series "À la ligne" of the ensemble 2e2m. His research also concerns the link between music and literature: he suggests Brahms' Violin Sonata No. 2 as a possible model for the Vinteuil Sonata. He has collaborated with the Royaumont Foundation.

Born in Enghien-les-Bains, Kan studied music at the Limoges Conservatory, then at the Rubin Academy of Tel-Aviv-Jaffa, in Walter Aufhauser's piano class.

== Publisher ==
Kan founded the "Éditions musicales européennes" (EME) in 1994 which was dissolved in 2010; they published nearly 500 works, including the works of composers of the new generation such as Bernard Cavanna, Thierry Pécou, François Narboni, Paul Méfano, Alain Louvier, Johannes Schöllhorn, Alberto Posadas, Philippe Schœller, José-Luis Campana, and Aureliano Cattaneo, – and those of composers of the beginning of the 20th century, including André Gedalge and Jacques de La Presle.

Through his intense editorial activity and close ties with composers, Kan is the dedicatee of several musical works: Gennevilliers Symphony (2003) by Bernard Cavanna, Clouds and Sky (2010) by Johannes Schöllhorn, Cripsis (2001) by Alberto Posadas, La Noia (2004) by François Narboni, Zéphyr (1999) by Suzanne Giraud, Sopherim (1998) by Philippe Schœller, Bing (2009) by Gérard Zinsstag.

== Musicology, writings, compositions ==
In 2008, impressed by the quality of the publications of the Artaria publishing house in Vienna (1796), he embarked on a pre-romantic reconstitution of Beethoven's piano sonatas. He published research on the opus 2 and opus 7.

In particular, he proposes a link between Beethoven's Piano Sonata No. 22 and the Battle of Valmy.

His recent research on Bach's The Well-Tempered Clavier directs him towards a new analysis of the cover page graphics of the manuscript leading to a possible link to the Book of Genesis.

Kan is also the author/translator of musical notices (Spur by Johannes Schöllhorn, Ça sonne by Bernard Cavanna) and the composer of educational works (Sept Études sur les intervalles for piano, two pieces (Ondée and Romance) for clarinet and piano).

His Piano Concert premiered in 1989 at the Salle Cortot by Martine Vialatte and the Ensemble orchestral d'Île-de-France, Bruno de Saint-Maurice conducting, and has been available on CD since 2015.

In 1999, he also launched a manifesto, with the support of 250 artists, on the programming of France Musique, expressing concern about the development of this radio station: "Everything concerning musicological knowledge, the diffusion of Baroque music, the encouragement of young talents, the discovery of traditional music and finally contemporary creation, everything has evaporated." Pierre Bouteiller, then director of that radio station, stayed the course and replied that the station could not be confiscated by specialists, musicologists and academics, and that the idea was to make this musical programme available to a wide audience.
