= Méry Laurent =

French salonnière and demimonde

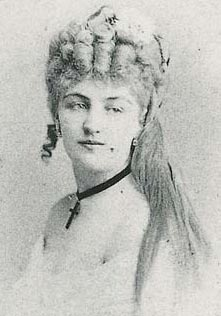
- Laurent c. 1870s-1880s
- Born: Anne Rose Suzanne Louviot; 29 April 1849; Nancy, France
- Died: November 26, 1900 (aged 51); Paris, France
- Known for: Demimonde, artist's model, salonnière

Méry Laurent, born Anne Rose Suzanne Louviot (29 April 1849 - 26 November 1900), was a demi-mondaine (courtesan) and the muse of several Parisian artists. She used to run her own "salon" where she hosted many French (and even American) writers and painters of her time: Stéphane Mallarmé, Émile Zola, Marcel Proust, François Coppée, Henri Gervex, James Whistler, and Édouard Manet.

== Biography ==
Anne Rose Suzanne Louviot was born in Nancy in 1849. She was the daughter of a woman who worked as a laundress in Marshal Francois Certain De Canrobert's household, and of an unknown father. Her laundress mother sold her 15-year-old daughter's virginity to Canrobert, so that her daughter would become Canorbert's mistress and receive an annuity for life of 500 francs per month. When she turned 16, this enabled her to go in Paris, where she started a career as an actress. She played in light comedies at the Théâtre des Variétés; the most well-known role there was the Venus Anadyomene, posing naked on her shell; at the Théâtre du Châtelet, she also played Offenbach's féeries such as La Belle Hélène.

In 1874, she met Thomas W. Evans, an extremely wealthy American dental surgeon who tended to many high-profile people, and even royal families. He made her his mistress and helped her settle down at 52, rue de Rome, where she held her "salon", hosting all of the Parisian artistic avant-garde. Through this occasion, she became the mistress of Francois Coppée, Stéphane Mallarmé, Antonin Proust, as well as Edouard Manet's mistress and model. Mallarme dedicated many poems to her, and they left behind a wealth of correspondence.

When Laurent died, she bequeathed her wealth to Victor Margueritte, her last favorite and "protégé", with the exception of her allegoric portrait of Autumn (a painting by Manet, begun in 1882), which went to the Museum of Fine Arts of Nancy.

Laurent was buried in the Père-Lachaise cemetery (56th section).

== Her "Salon" ==
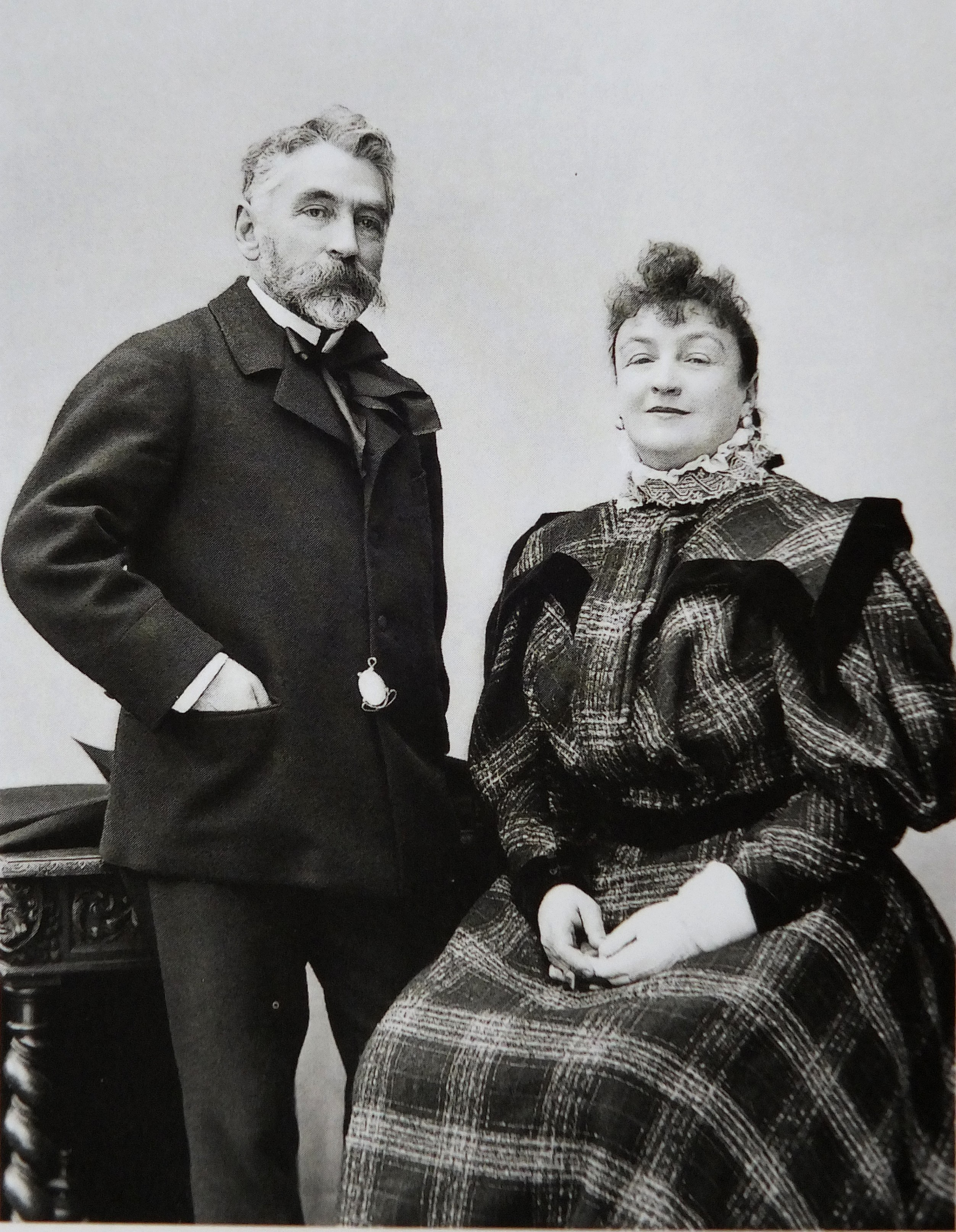
Méry Laurent (right) and Stéphane Mallarmé, 1896

The "salon" she ran was a place of exchanges which boosted the creative steps of those who patronized it: one could find there Edouard Manet and Henri Gervex, but also poets and writers such as Stéphane Mallarmé, François Coppée, Joris-Karl Huysmans, Marcel Proust (the author painted Méry Laurent's portrait through Odette de Crécy's character in "Swann in Love",) or even Zola (who based his 1880 novel Nana on Méry Laurent). She also received sculptors, lyrical artists and musicians, such as Hortense Schneider and Reynaldo Hahn. Hahn would go on to become her testamentary executor.

== Her portraits by Edouard Manet ==
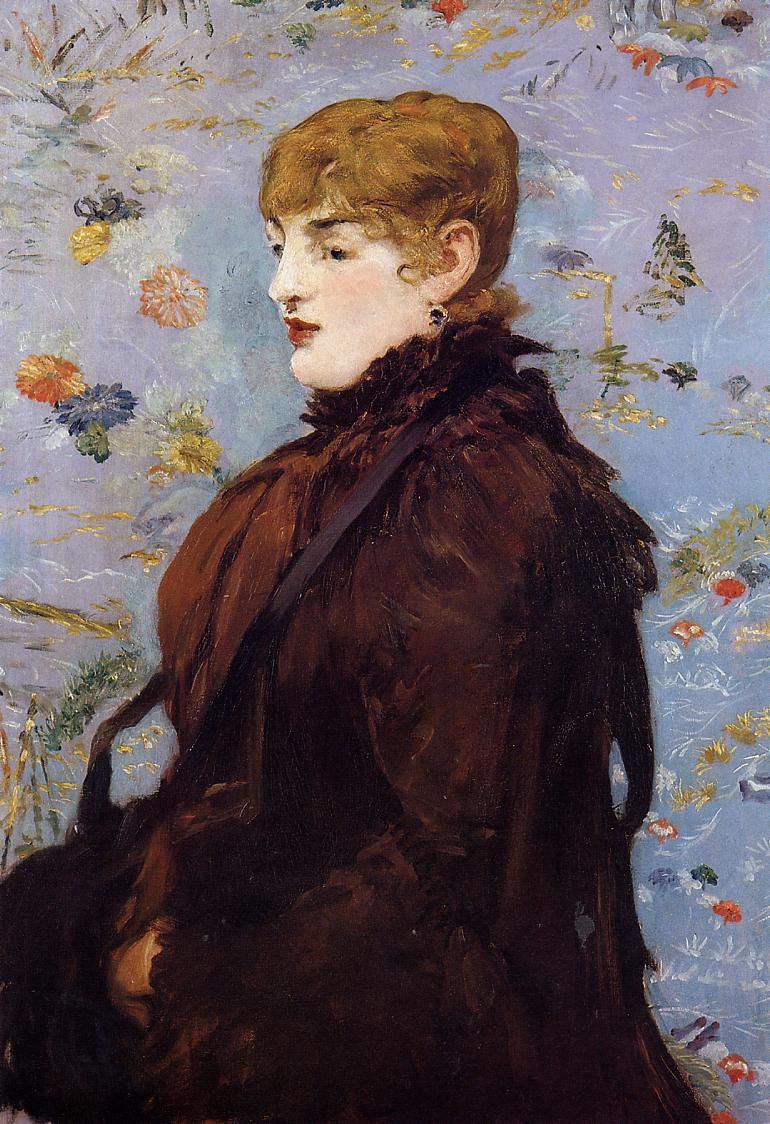
Autumn, Portrait Of Méry Laurent in a Brown Fur Cape, 1881

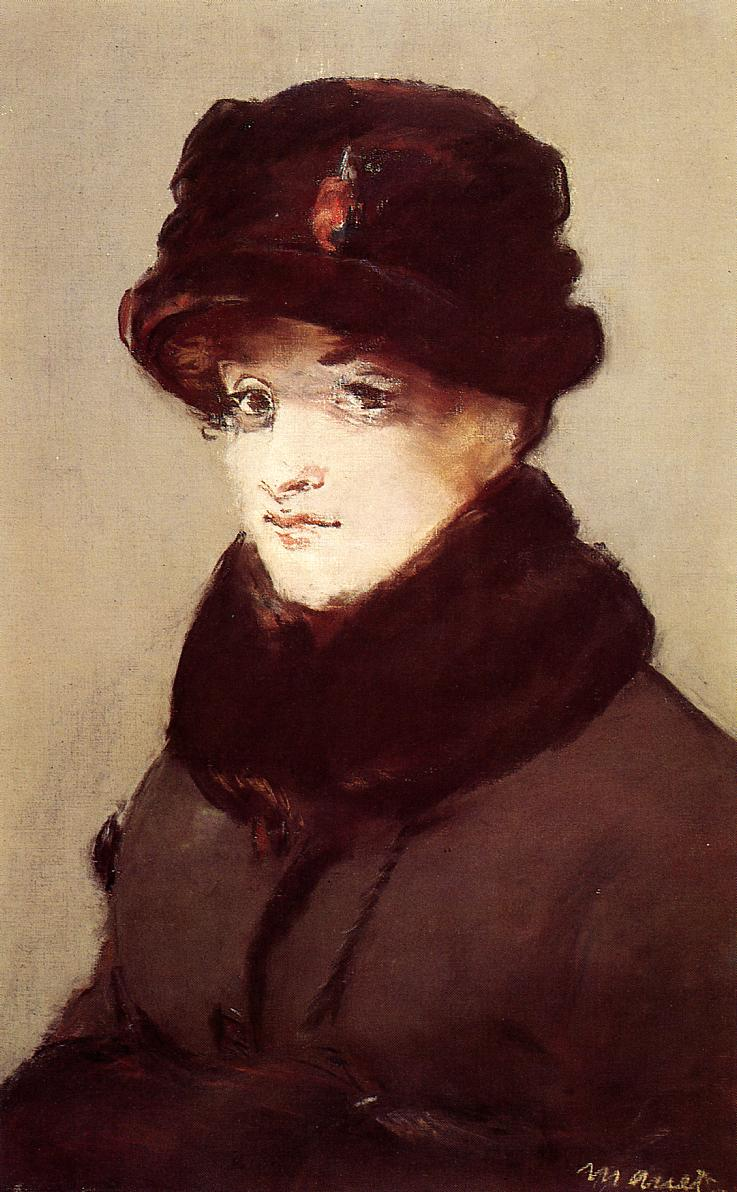
Méry Laurent with a Fur Hat, 1882

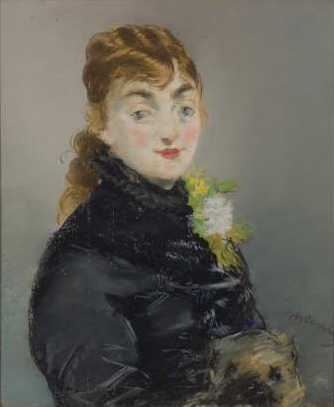
Méry Laurent with a Pug, 1882

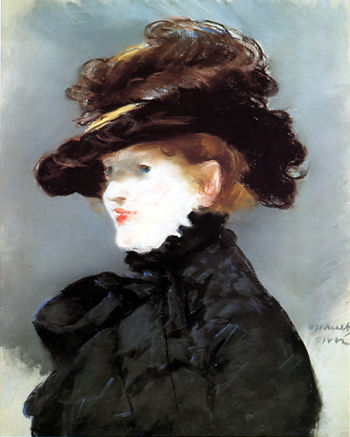
Méry Laurent with a black hat, 1882

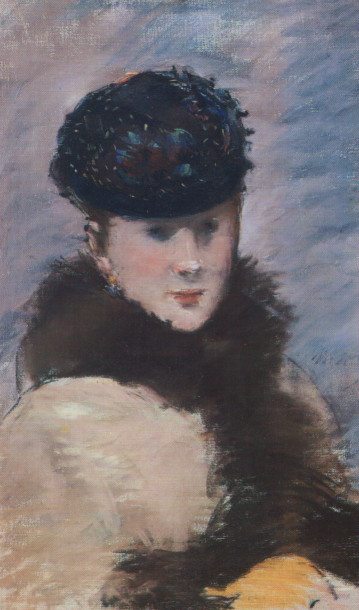
Méry Laurent with a little hat, 1882
