= Jeanette Dincin =

American violinist (1902–1967)

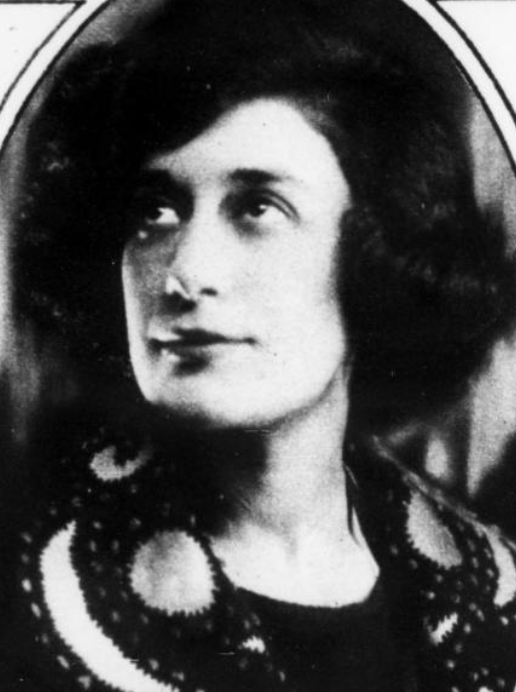
- Jeanette Dincin, from a 1924 publication
- Born: August 26, 1902; Brooklyn, New York
- Died: November 1967 (aged 65)
- Other name: Jeannette Dincin Ysaÿe
- Occupation: Violinist
- Spouse: Eugène Ysaÿe
- Relatives: Theo Ysaÿe (brother-in-law)

Jeanette Dincin Ysaÿe (August 26, 1902 – November 1967), also seen as Jeannette Dincin Ysaÿe, was an American violinist and violin teacher. She was a student and personal secretary of Eugène Ysaÿe, and became his wife in 1927.

== Early life ==
Dincin was from Brooklyn, the daughter of Herman Dincin and Lena Tietze Dincin. Her father was a physician. She studied violin as a child at the New York College of Music, and later with Leopold Auer, Otakar Ševčik, and Ysaÿe.

== Career ==
Dincin made her concert debut in Paris in 1923, and performed in Germany, Switzerland, Spain, Belgium and England in the 1920s. She taught violin at the Royal Conservatory of Brussels, and in private lessons for Queen Elisabeth of Belgium. She cared for her husband in his last years at their home in Brussels, and after his death promoted his work, while performing and teaching in the United States. She played his Guarneri violin in at least one concert, in New York in 1932; the same violin was played by Isaac Stern from 1965 to 1998.

== Personal life ==
Dincin married her widowed Belgian violin teacher, Ysaÿe, in 1927. Her husband was in ill health for much of their marriage, and died in 1931. She died in 1967, aged 65 years. The Juilliard School's Lila Acheson Wallace Library holds a collection of Dincin's papers, including unpublished compositions and arrangements by her husband.
