= Violin Sonata No. 3 (Ysaÿe) =

1923 composition by Eugène Ysaÿe

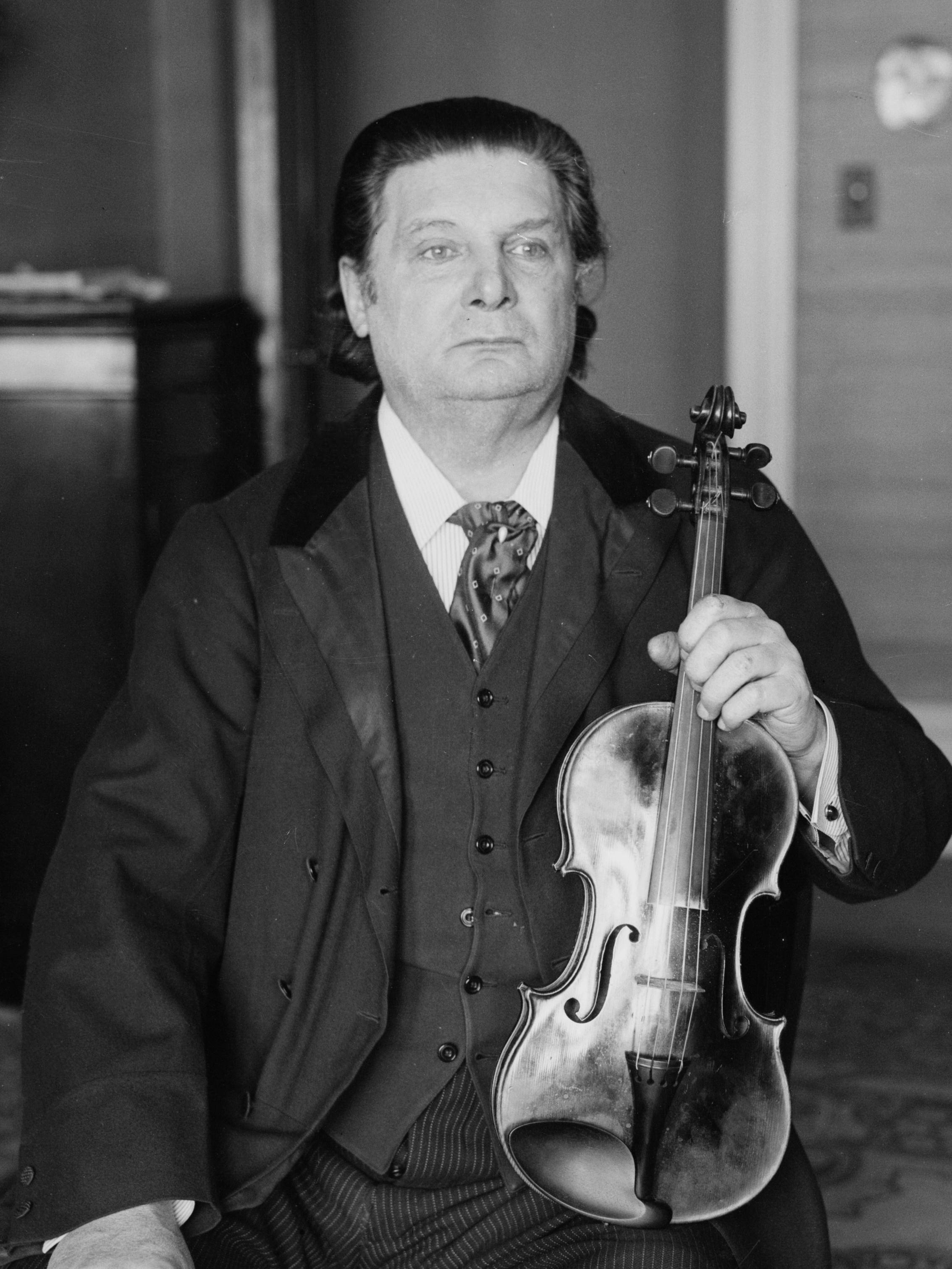
Eugène Ysaÿe, around 1915

The Sonata for Solo Violin "Ballade", Op. 27, No. 3 in D minor is a sonata in one movement written in 1923, as the third sonata from the set of Six Sonatas for solo violin by Eugène Ysaÿe. It is dedicated to the Romanian violinist and composer George Enescu.

== History ==
During the 20th century, this sonata was the most often played out of the six sonatas, and it still remains one of Ysaÿe’s most popular works.

Ysaÿe himself wrote of the sonata, “I have let my imagination wander at will. The memory of my friendship and admiration for George Enescu and the performances we gave together at the home of the delightful Queen Carmen Sylvia have done the rest.”

== Structure ==
The sonata is a single movement written in two sections.

The first section, marked Lento molto sostenuto, is a slow introduction in the manner of a recitative, which hints at some of the motifs to be heard later in the piece. It makes use of the whole tone scale, as well as many disjunct melodic leaps, and a large amount of dissonance and chromaticism.

The introduction leads directly into the main section of the piece, marked Allegro in tempo giusto e con bravura. It is in 3/8 meter, and is characterised by agitated dotted rhythms, as well as many double and triple stops. After a calmer middle section with rapid legato triplet passages, the dotted rhythm theme returns. The piece ends with a brilliant coda of very fast demisemiquaver passages.
