= Ber Zalkind =

Lithuanian painter

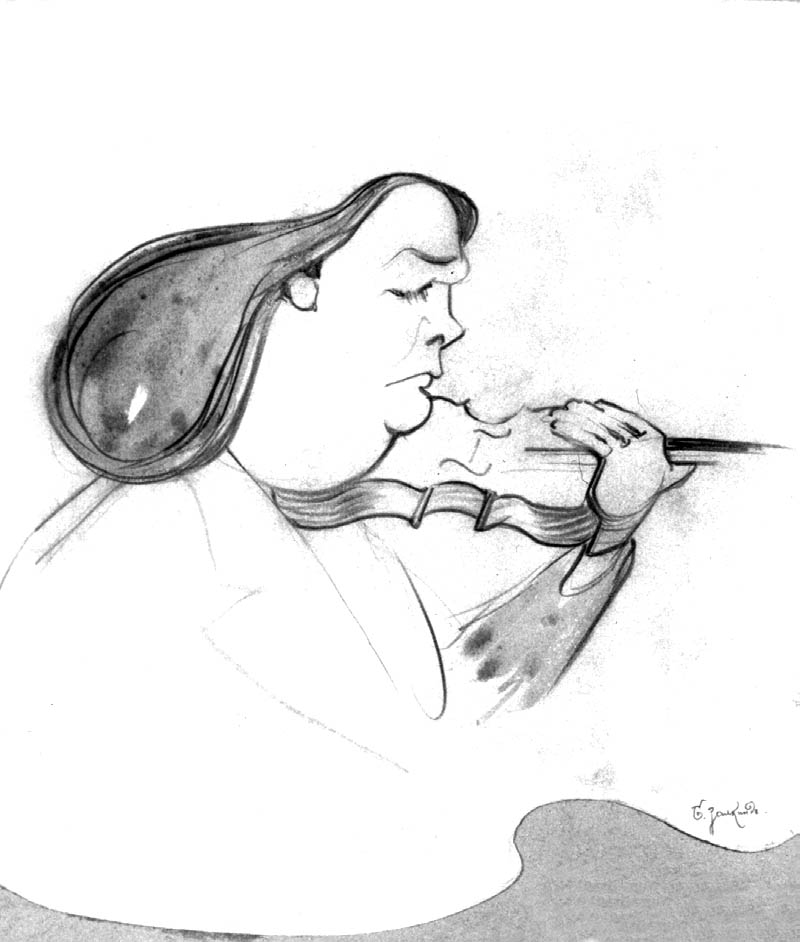
Ber Zalkind. “Cartoon of Violinist Eugène Ysaÿe.” 1913

Ber Zalkind (1878-1944) was a Lithuanian Jewish painter. He studied in Paris, France and was a member of the Artists' Association of Vilna from 1909.
