= Hermine Spies =

German opera singer (1857–1893)

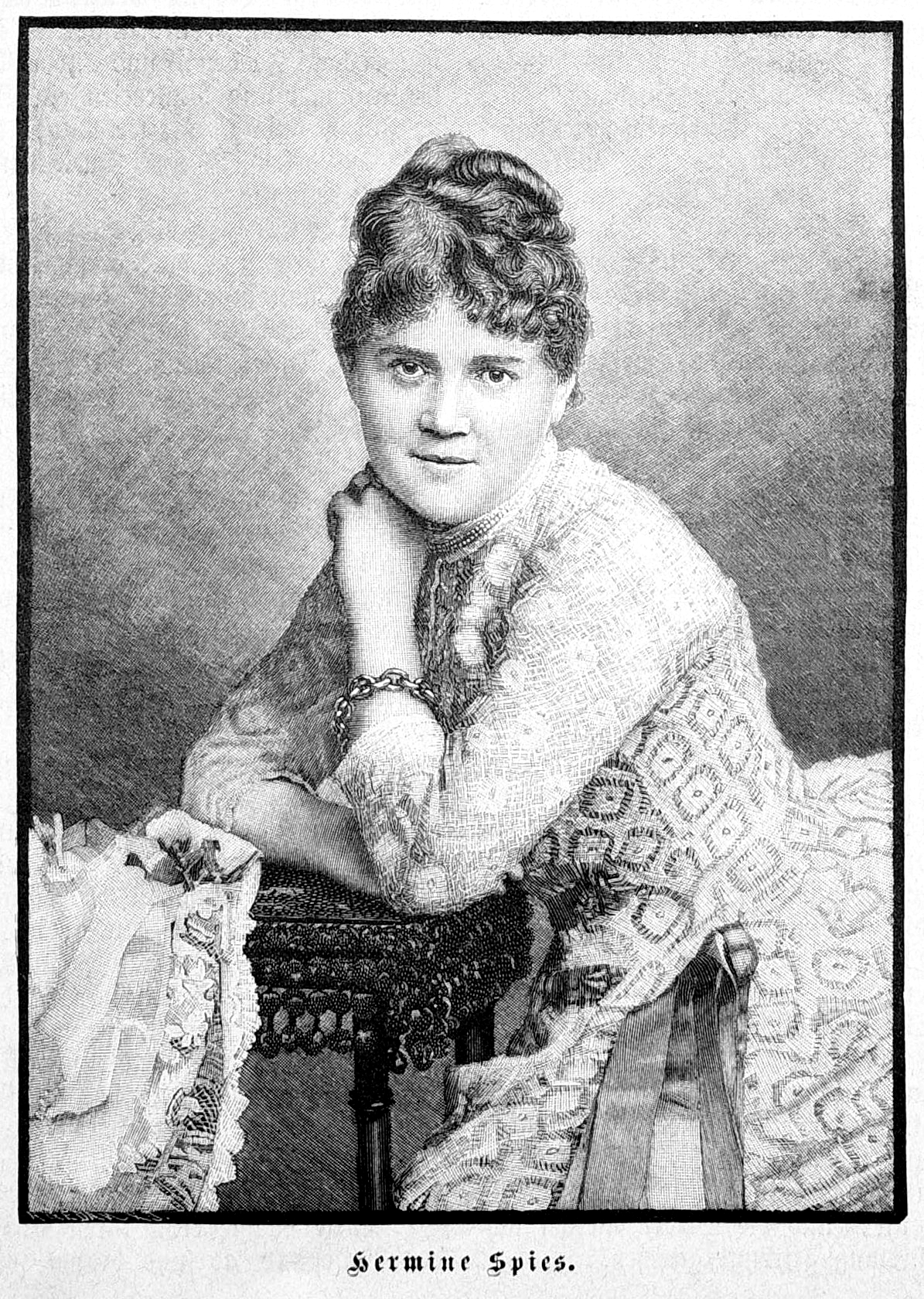
Hermine Spies in 1887

Hermine Spies (German pronunciation: [hɛʁ'miːnə ʃpiːs], 25 February 1857 – 26 February 1893) was a German concert and opera singer.

== Life ==
Hermine Spies (also Spieß) was considered to be one of the leading alto singers of the late 19th century, and an exceptional interpreter of the works of Johannes Brahms, whom she knew personally. Spies struck up a close friendship with the much older Brahms in the late 1870s, and he composed a number of songs for her and accompanied her on the piano in recitals, including his Fünf Lieder, Op. 105. Brahms is often thought to have been infatuated with the young singer.

Born near Löhnberg, Spies moved with her family to Wiesbaden in 1879. She took lessons with the voice teacher Julius Stockhausen at Dr Hoch's Conservatory in Frankfurt am Main and made her stage debut in 1880 in Mannheim. In 1892 she married a judge named Walter Hardtmuth. Though she was at the height of her career, she decided to retire into private life. She died aged 36 while pregnant.

A street was named after her in 1958 in Wiesbaden.
