= Guillaume Lekeu =

Belgian composer (1870–1894)

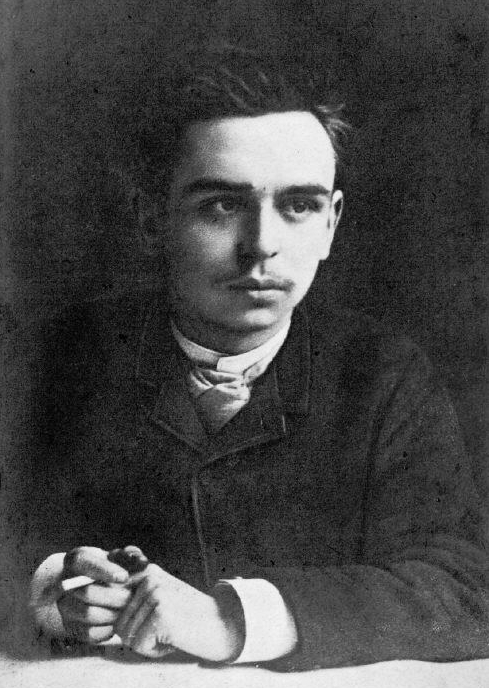
Guillaume Lekeu

Jean Joseph Nicolas Guillaume Lekeu (French pronunciation: [ɡijom ləkø]; 20 January 1870 – 21 January 1894) was a Belgian composer.

== Life ==
Lekeu was born in Heusy, a village near Verviers, Belgium. He originally studied piano and music theory under Alphonse Voss, the director of the brass band at the local conservatory. In 1879, his parents moved to Poitiers, France. He continued to pursue his music studies independently while at school, composing his first piece at the age of 15. From 1885 onwards, he regularly composed new music, especially chamber music, and studied harmony and violin from 1887 under Octave Grisard.

In June 1888, his family moved to Paris where he began to study philosophy. He was introduced to the works of Téodor de Wyzewa and continued his studies under Gaston Vallin. In August 1889, he travelled to Bayreuth to see the operas of Richard Wagner. On his return, he studied counterpoint and fugue privately with César Franck. Franck encouraged him to continue composing; after Franck's death in the autumn of 1890, Wyzewa introduced him to Vincent d'Indy, who taught him orchestration and encouraged him to compete for the Belgian Prix de Rome, awarded in Brussels. In 1891, he won second prize in the competition for the cantata Andromède.

In 1892, d'Indy introduced Lekeu to Octave Maus, then secretary of Brussels-based Le Cercle des XX. Eugène Ysaÿe commissioned a work from him, the Violin Sonata in G major, which premiered in March 1893 and is his most famous and most often recorded work.

Lekeu contracted typhoid fever from a contaminated sorbet in October 1893. He died in his parents' home in Angers on 21 January 1894, the day after his 24th birthday. On 26 January 1894, he was buried in a small cemetery in Heusy.

== Musical style and influences ==
Lekeu's personal style was present in his earliest compositions. In 1887, he said "Bien plus, ce sera bizarre, détraqué, horrible, tout ce qu'on voudra; mais, du moins, ce sera original" ("Even more, it will be weird, mad, horrible, anything you like, but at least it will be original").

Lekeu's string quartets were inspired by Beethoven, and exposure to Wagner's operas at Bayreuth influenced his approaches to melody. He described this as "des mélodies de telle longueur qu'un seul exposé suffisait à parfaire ... un morceau de musique" ("melodies of such length that a single presentation was sufficient to complete ... a piece of music").

His primary influence was Franck. Many of his works are characterized by a certain melancholy: in his own words, "la joie [est] mille fois plus difficile à peindre que la souffrance" ("joy is a thousand times harder to paint than suffering").

His larger compositions are cyclic in structure; that is, themes in his works will often recur from movement to movement, something no doubt inherited from a long tradition of nineteenth-century European composers, as well as from many works of Franck and d'Indy. The recurring themes in the violin sonata have led some scholars to suggest that it was an inspiration for the Vinteuil Sonata, an imaginary work described by Marcel Proust in In Search of Lost Time. However, the structure imagined by Proust is also similar to the violin sonata by Franck.

His style, prophetic of early-twentieth-century avant-garde French composers like Satie and Milhaud, was influenced by Franck, Wagner and (especially in the Trio) Beethoven, though these influences did not manifest themselves as mere imitation. In general, Lekeu is regarded as a highly talented composer whose death cut short a promising musical career.

== Compositions ==
Lekeu composed about 50 works and left a number of unfinished compositions at the time of his death. Two of these, a Cello Sonata and his Piano Quartet, were completed by d'Indy. All have been recorded at least once, and several of them more than once, notably the Violin Sonata in G Major and the Piano Trio in C minor. The first time the Piano Sonata in G minor was completely performed live was by pianist Paweł Albiński in Kraków, Poland on 20 August 2014.

Significant works

=== Choral ===
- Chant lyrique, for chorus & orchestra (poem by Lamartine) (1891)
- Andromède. Poème lyrique et symphonique, cantata (in 2 acts) for soprano, tenor, baritone, and bass soloists, chorus, and orchestra (text by Jules Sauvenière) (1891)

=== Songs ===
- Two poems of Lamartine, for voice & piano (1887)
  - La Fenêtre de la maison paternelle
  - Les Pavots
- Two songs with words by Lekeu, for voice & piano (1889)
  - Quelque antique et lente danse
  - L'ombre plus dense
- Chanson de Mai, song for voice & piano (text by Jean Lekeu) (1891)
- Plainte d'Andromède, for soprano & piano sextet (string quartet and doublebass) (1892)
- Trois Poèmes, for voice & piano (also arr. for unaccompanied soprano) (words by Lekeu) (1892)
  - Sur une tombe
  - Ronde
  - Nocturne (also arr. for mezzo-soprano & piano quintet)

=== Orchestra ===
- Introduction symphonique aux Burgraves (Overture after Victor Hugo's Les Burgraves) (2 movements), for orchestra (1889)
- Barberine, Prélude (Prélude au 2e acte) (Prelude to Act II of the opera Barberine), for orchestra (1889)
- Chant de triomphale délivrance, Étude symphonique (Première Étude symphonique), for orchestra (1889–90)
- Hamlet. Étude symphonique (Deuxième Étude symphonique) (Hamlet et Ophélie), for orchestra (2 mvts) (1890)
  1. Hamlet
  2. Ophélie
- Les Fleurs pâles du souvenir, Adagio pour quatuor d'orchestre, for string orchestra (with violin solo) (1891)
- Fantaisie sur deux airs populaires angevins (Fantasy on two Angers folktunes), for orchestra (also for piano 4-hands) (1892)

=== Concertante and ensemble works ===
- Fantaisie contrapuntique sur un cramignon liégeois (Contrapuntal fantasy on the Liège Cramignon), for chamber orchestra (with choreography for the individual musicians) (1890)
- Épithalame, for organ & string orchestra (with 3 trombones) (1891)
- Larghetto, for cello & string orchestra (with 2 horns & bassoon) (1892)
- Introduction et Adagio pour tuba et orchestre d'harmonie (tuba & wind orchestra) (1892)

=== Chamber music ===
- Quatuor (String Quartet) in G major, (in 6 mvts) (1888)
- Sonate (Cello Sonata) in F major (in 4 descriptive mvts) (1888)
- Trio pour piano, violon et violoncelle (Trio à clavier) (Piano Trio) in C minor (in 4 mvts) (1889–91)
- Sonate pour piano et violon (Violin Sonata) in G major (in 3 mvts) (1892–93)
- Quatuor a clavier (Piano Quartet) in B minor (2 mvts) (1892–94)

=== Piano ===
- Berceuse et Valse (Pot-pourri), for piano (1887)
- Morceaux égoïstes, for piano (7 pieces) (1887–88)
- Morceau (a fantasia on a Cramignon or Walloon folk dance melody), for piano 4-hands (1889)
- Sonate (Piano Sonata) in G minor (in 5 mvts) (1891)
- 3 Pièces, for piano (1892)
  - Chansonette sans paroles
  - Valse oubliée
  - Danse joyeuse
