= Klaus Groth =

Low German poet (1819–1899)

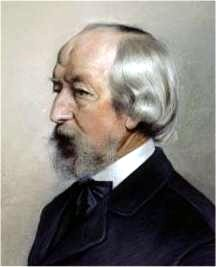
- Portrait painting of Klaus Groth wearing formal black clothing (1888), by C.W.Allers
- Born: April 24, 1819; Heide, Dithmarschen
- Died: June 1, 1899 (aged 80)

Klaus Groth (24 April 1819 – 1 June 1899) was a Low German poet.

== Biography ==
Groth was born in Heide, in Ditmarschen, the western part of the Duchy of Holstein. He was the oldest son of Hartwig Groth, a miller, and his wife Anna Christina. He spent an idyllic childhood in Heide, which served as inspiration for many of his later poetic works. After attending the local school, he studied at the teacher training college in Tondern from 1838 to 1841. Groth subsequently became a teacher at the girls’ school in his native village and devoted his spare time to the study of philosophy, mathematics, and the natural sciences. He took an interest in local traditions and played a part in several unique to Dithmarschen. Groth did not enjoy teaching and frequently came into conflict with both the school’s board of governors and his students’ parents. In 1847, he suffered a nervous breakdown. A friend and follow teacher, Leonhard Selle, invited Groth to spend time with him on the island of Fehmarn, in the Baltic Sea. He stayed with Selle for six years, and it was on Fehmarn that his famous Low German poetry compilation Quickborn was written.

The publication of Quickborn in 1852 brought Groth fame across the German-speaking states, and he quickly moved to Kiel and began writing more poems, as well as his first attempts at prose, all in Low German.

Groth’s health was often poor and this prompted him to take a trip to Rome in 1855 to recuperate, but he only came as far as Bonn. While he was there, the University of Bonn awarded him an honorary doctorate for his services to the German language.

Back in Kiel after two years of travelling, he courted Doris Finke, the daughter of a wealthy wine merchant from Bremen, and married her in 1859. The couple had four sons. To provide for his growing family, Groth strove for a position as professor of literature at the University of Kiel and, in 1866, succeeded at his goal. In the same year, his oldest son died and the family moved into a house of their own in the "Schwanenweg". Groth continued to live in this house until his death.

Doris organised a great many social gatherings and music evenings in their home and through these the Groth family established important social contacts, becoming friends with many contemporary musicians such as Clara Schumann. Johannes Brahms, especially, became a close personal friend of Groth. He also became acquainted with many painters; it is through these relationships that Klaus Groth became the most painted poet of the 19th century.

The next few years proved very hard for Groth; Doris died of tuberculosis in 1878 and his youngest son of appendicitis in 1889.

His eightieth birthday in 1899 prompted large celebrations, especially in Kiel. The cities of Kiel and Heide both awarded him honorary citizenship. He died on 1 June 1899, only a few weeks after turning eighty. A large funeral was held in Kiel, attended by politicians, government envoys, poets, musicians and artists.

== Works ==
In his Low German lyric and epic poems, heavily influenced by the works of Johann Peter Hebel, Groth writes of the country life of his home region. Although his descriptions may not always reflect the peculiar characteristics of the peasantry of Holstein as faithfully as those of his rival Fritz Reuter, Groth is a lyric poet of genuine inspiration. Groth strove to show the Low German language, as well as the people who spoke it, as something noble and worthy of high poetry.

His chief works are Quickborn, Volksleben - in plattdeutschen Gedichten Ditmarscher Mundart (1852; 25th edition 1900; and in (standard) German translations, notably by MJ Berchem, Krefeld, 1896); and two volumes of stories, Vertelln (1835-1859, 3rd edition 1881); also Vær de Gærn (1858) and Ut min Jungsparadies (1875).

Groth's Gesammelte Werke appeared in four volumes (Kiel, 1893). His Lebenserinnerungen were edited by E. Wolff in 1891; see also K. Eggers, K. Groth und die plattdeutsche Dichtung (1885); and biographies by A. Bartels (1899) and H. Siercks (1899).

== Music ==
Since Groth and his wife were well acquainted with many musicians of their time, a lot of his poems were set to music. All in all, there are 1149 known musical versions of his poems by 224 composers.

Johannes Brahms set thirteen High German poems to music, among them the poem "Wie Melodien zieht es mir leise durch den Sinn" that became Brahms' No. 1 of his Fünf Lieder, Op. 105.
