= Swann in Love (novella) =

Novella by Marcel Proust

Swann in Love (French: Un amour de Swann) is a section from the novel sequence In Search of Lost Time by the French writer Marcel Proust. This narrative is included in Swann's Way (Du côté de chez Swann), the first volume of In Search of Lost Time, which was published in 1913.

Un amour de Swann is about the love affair between Charles Swann and Odette. The story is largely self-contained and is novella-length. For these reasons, various publishers have printed Un amour de Swann as a stand-alone volume. For example, it is included in the Encyclopedia Britannica series 'Great Books of the Western World' in the first of two volumes dedicated to the 'Imaginative Literature of the Twentieth Century' as a stand-alone work.

== Translations ==
The atmospheric English translation by C. K. Scott Moncrieff is widely admired, although his Edwardian English dates it to some extent and its elegance may dilute the emotional complexity. Recent English translations of this section include those by:

- Brian Nelson
  - Swann in Love (Oxford World's Classics 2017)
  - The Swann Way (Oxford, 2023)
- Lucy Raitz (Pushkin Press, 2022)
