= Eugène Ysaÿe =

Belgian violinist and composer (1858–1931)

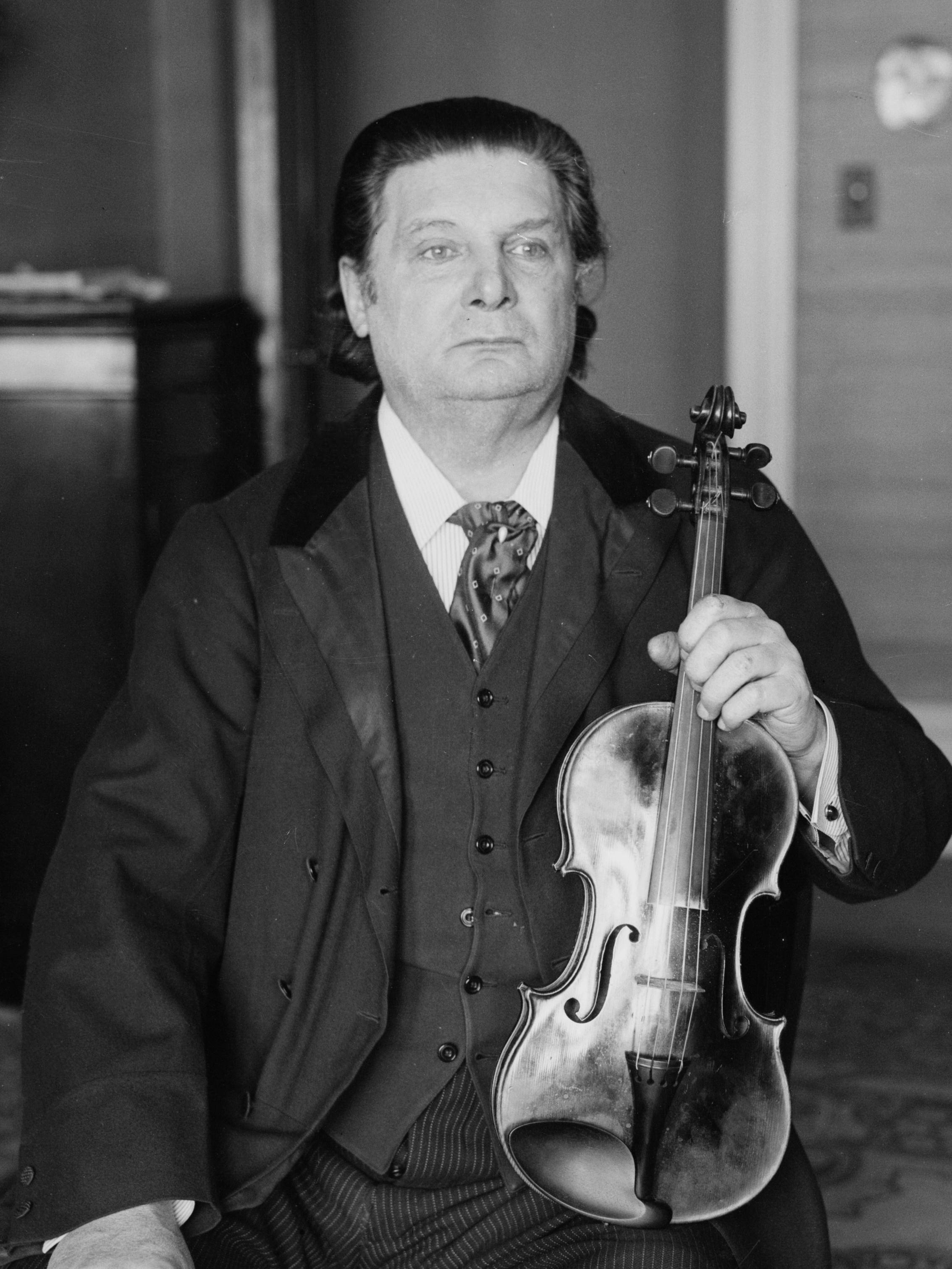
Eugène Ysaÿe, around 1915

Eugène-Auguste Ysaÿe (French: [øʒɛn iza.i]; 16 July 1858 – 12 May 1931) was a Belgian violinist, composer, and conductor. He was regarded as "The King of the Violin", or, as his former student Nathan Milstein put it, the "tsar".

== Early years ==
Born in Liège, Ysaÿe began violin lessons at age five with his father. He would later recognise his father's teaching as the foundation of everything he knew on his instrument, even though he went on to study with highly reputed masters. In 1867, Ysaÿe entered the Royal Conservatory of Liège to study with Désiré Heynberg, and in the process won a shared second prize with the Viotti 22nd Violin Concerto. He then went on to study with Henryk Wieniawski for two years in Brussels and Henri Vieuxtemps in Paris.

Studying with these teachers meant that he was part of the Franco-Belgian school of violin playing, which dates back to the development of the modern violin bow by François Tourte. Qualities of this "École" included elegance, a full tone with a sense of drawing a "long" bow with no jerks, precise left hand techniques, and bowing using the whole forearm while keeping both the wrist and upper arm quiet (as opposed to Joseph Joachim's German school of wrist bowing and Leopold Auer's Russian concept of using the whole arm).

== Early career ==
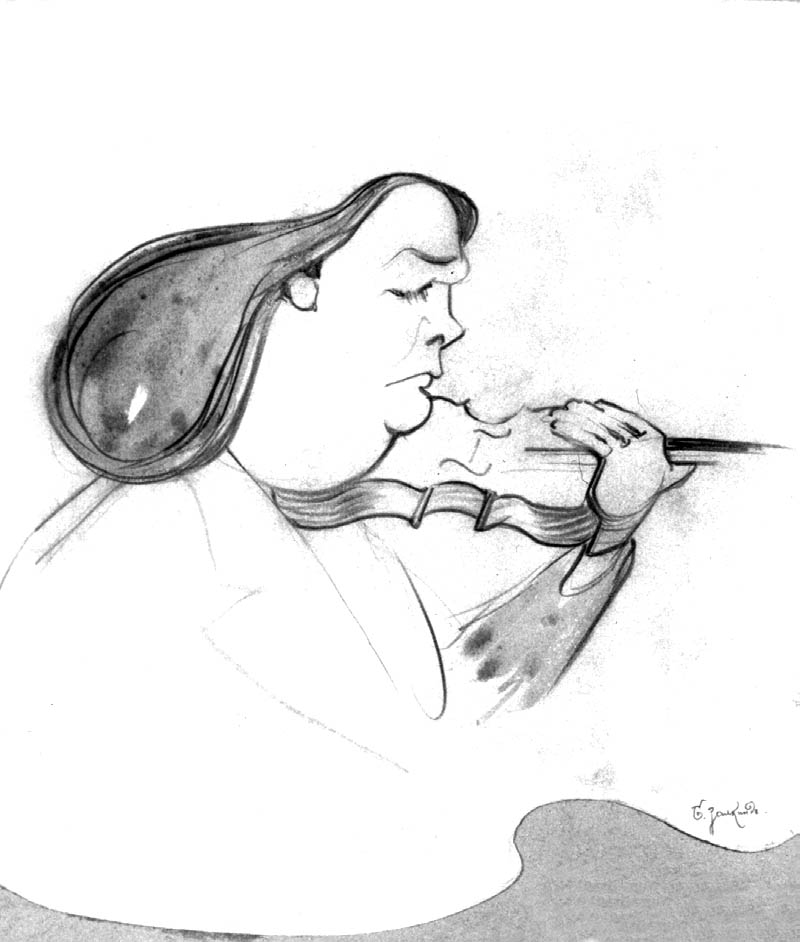
Ber Zalkind. "Cartoon of Violinist Eugène Ysaÿe" (1913)

After his graduation from the Royal Conservatory of Liège, Ysaÿe was the principal violin of the Benjamin Bilse beer-hall orchestra, which later developed into the Berlin Philharmonic. Many musicians of note and influence came regularly to hear this orchestra and Ysaÿe in particular, among them Joseph Joachim, Franz Liszt, Clara Schumann, and Anton Rubinstein, who asked that Ysaÿe be released from his contract to accompany him on tour.

When Ysaÿe was 27 years old, he was recommended as a soloist for one of the Concerts Colonne in Paris, which was the start of his great success as a concert artist. The next year, Ysaÿe received a professorship at the Brussels Conservatoire. His teaching career continued for the rest of his life, even after he left the Conservatory in 1898. Among his notable pupils were Josef Gingold, the viola virtuoso William Primrose, the violin virtuoso Nathan Milstein (who primarily studied with Pyotr Stolyarsky), Oskar Back, Ernest Bloch, Jascha Brodsky, Mathieu Crickboom, George Enescu, Aldo Ferraresi, Jonny Heykens, Nellie A. Hope, Charles Houdret, Julia Klumpke, Louis Persinger, Oscar Shumsky, and Jacques Thibaud. (See: List of music students by teacher: T to Z#Eugène Ysaÿe.)

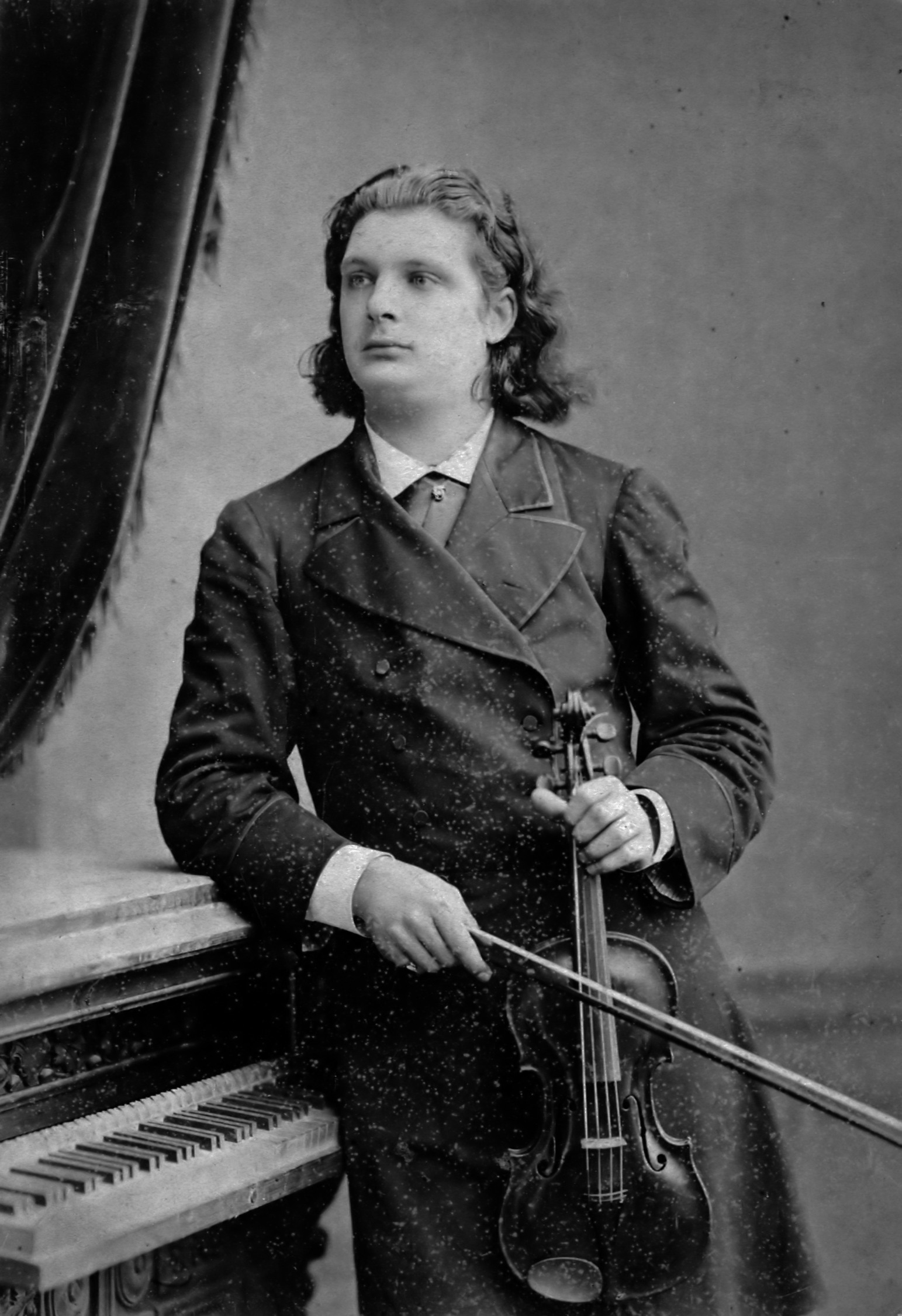
Eugène Ysaÿe in Russia, 1883

During his tenure as professor at the Conservatoire, Ysaÿe continued to tour ever more widely, visiting all of Europe, Russia, and the United States. Despite health concerns, particularly regarding the condition of his hands, Ysaÿe was at his best when performing, and many prominent composers dedicated major works to him, including Claude Debussy, Camille Saint-Saëns, César Franck, and Ernest Chausson. He arranged for violin and orchestra Saint-Saëns's Étude en forme de valse, which had originally been written for solo piano.

Franck's Violin Sonata in A was written as a wedding present for Ysaÿe and his wife in 1886. Ysaÿe played it often for the rest of his life. Chausson's Poème was his response to Ysaÿe's request for a concerto. Joseph Szigeti thought those two dedications demonstrated the enormous respect in which Ysaÿe was held.

In 1886, he established the Ysaÿe Quartet, which premiered Debussy's String Quartet.

== Teaching and composing ==
As his physical ailments grew more prohibitive, Ysaÿe turned more to teaching, conducting and an early love, composition. Among his most famous works are the six Sonatas for Solo Violin op. 27, the unaccompanied Sonata for Cello, op. 28, one Sonata for Two Violins, eight Poèmes for various instruments (one or two violins, violin and cello, string quartet) and orchestra (Poème élégiaque, Poème de l'Extase, Chant d'hiver, Poème nocturne, among others), pieces for string orchestra without basses (including Exil), several violin concertos, various shorter pieces for violin and piano, two string trios, an early string quintet, and an opera, Peter the Miner, written near the end of his life in the Walloon language.

Ysaÿe had been offered the post of music director of the New York Philharmonic in 1898, but declined it due to his busy solo performance schedule. In 1918, he accepted the music director's position with the Cincinnati Symphony Orchestra, where he remained until 1922 and with which he made several recordings.

Finally, in 1931, suffering from the extreme ravages of diabetes that had necessitated the amputation of his left foot, Eugène Ysaÿe died in his house in Forest, Belgium, 48 Avenue Brugmann, and was interred in the Ixelles Cemetery in Brussels.

== Performing career ==
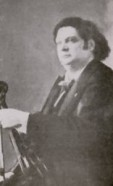
Ysaÿe with violin

As a performer, Ysaÿe was compelling and highly original. Pablo Casals claimed never to have heard a violinist play in tune before Ysaÿe, and Carl Flesch called him "the most outstanding and individual violinist I have ever heard in my life."

Ysaÿe possessed a large and flexible tone, influenced by a considerable variety of vibrato — from no vibrato at all to very intense. He said, "Don't always vibrate, but always be vibrating". His modus operandi was, in his own words: "Nothing which wouldn't have for goal emotion, poetry, heart." The conductor Sir Henry Wood said, "The quality of tone was ravishingly beautiful.... He seemed to get more colour out of a violin than any of his contemporaries."

Possibly the most distinctive feature of Ysaÿe's interpretations was his masterful rubato (in English: "stolen"). Sir Henry Wood said, "Whenever he stole time from one note, he faithfully paid it back within four bars", allowing his accompanist to maintain strict tempo under his free cantilena. Incidentally, this kind of rubato fits the description of Frédéric Chopin's rubato.

Although Ysaÿe was a celebrated interpreter of late Romantic and early modern composers such as Max Bruch, Camille Saint-Saëns, and César Franck, who composed his Violin Sonata as a wedding present for Ysaÿe. He was also highly admired for his interpretations of Bach and Beethoven.

An international violin competition in Brussels was created in his memory: in 1951, this became the violin section of the Queen Elisabeth Music Competition.

== Personal life ==
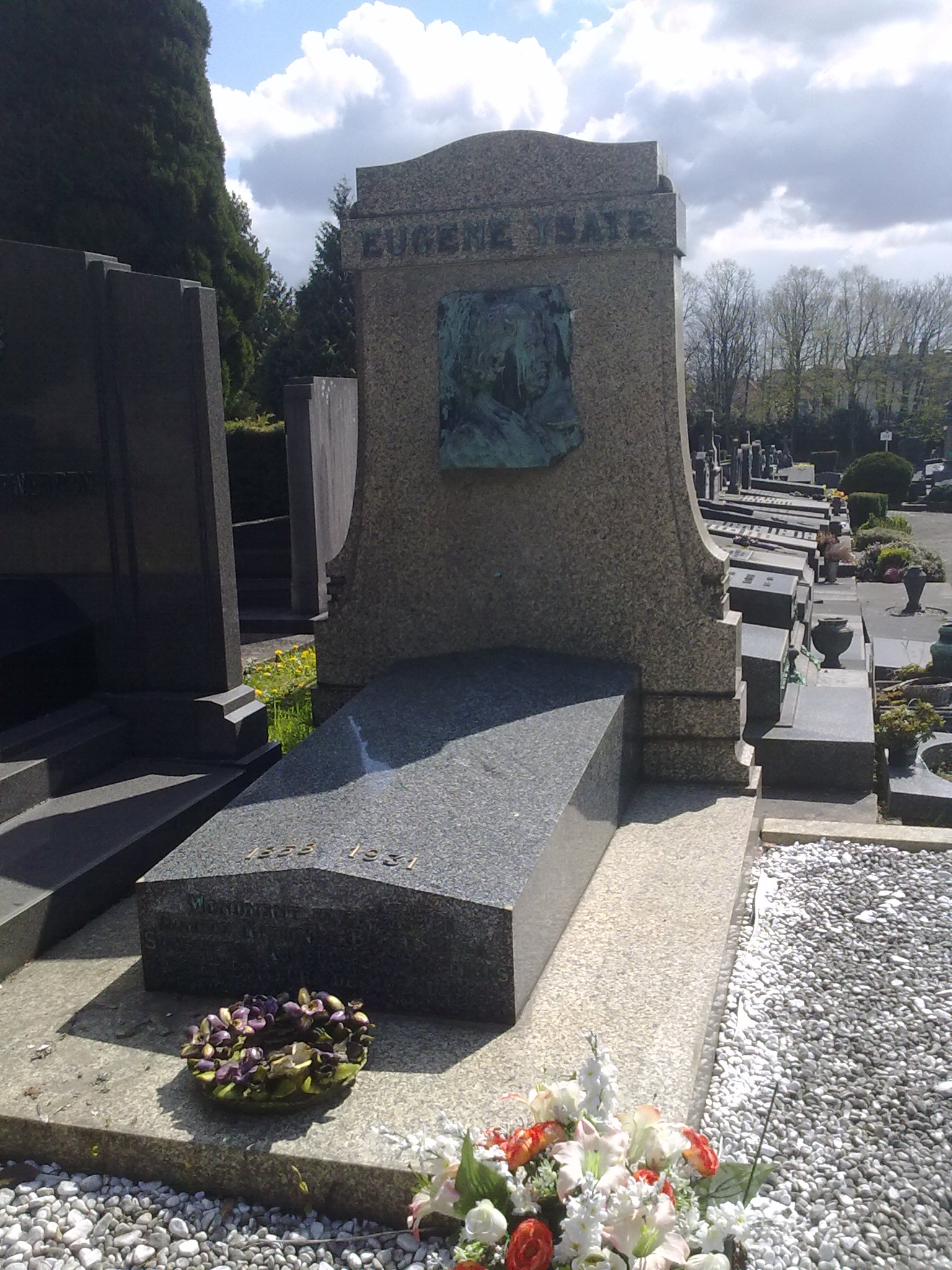
Eugène Ysaÿe's grave in Brussels (Ixelles Cemetery)

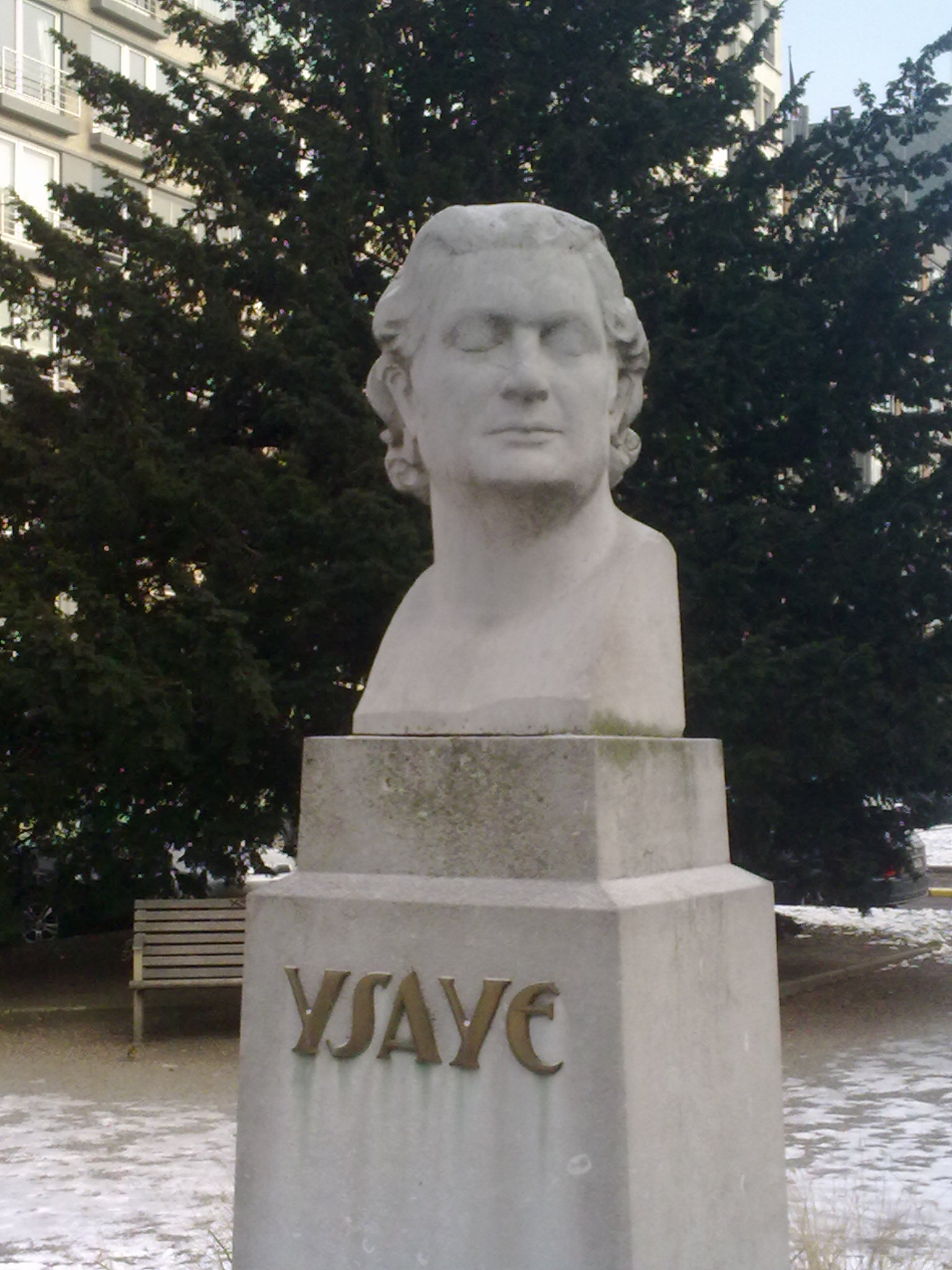
Bust of Eugène Ysaÿe in Liège (Boulevard Piercot gardens)

Ysaÿe was married twice. His first marriage, on 28 September 1886 in Arlon, was to Louise Bourdau (from Dendermonde), with whom he had three sons and two daughters: Gabriel (1887–1961), Carry (1889–1930), Thérèse called Thésy (1890–1956), Antoine (1894–1979) and Théodore (1898–1934). César Franck presented his Violin Sonata in A to them as a gift on the morning of the wedding, and after a hurried rehearsal Ysaÿe performed the piece at the marriage celebration. The sonata had its formal concert premiere in Brussels on 15 December 1886 with Franck in the audience.

After Louise's death (9 February 1924) he married a pupil of his, Jeanette Dincin (1902–1967), 44 years his junior. She was a violinist who in her teens had studied with prominent teachers such as Franz Kneisel, Leopold Auer, and Otakar Ševčík. Ysaÿe met her in 1922 while conductor of the Cincinnati Orchestra. She cared for him in his ailing years. Eugène's only request of her after he died was that she carry on her performances under his name.

His brother was pianist and composer Théo Ysaÿe (1865–1918), and his great-grandson is Marc Ysaÿe, founder-controller of radio Classic 21 and drummer of rock band Machiavel. Eugène Ysaÿe was also close friends with Queen Elisabeth of Belgium, whom he taught violin despite her lack of talent. His widow took over the royal teaching herself after his death, and the queen began the competition in his honour. His granddaughter, Nadine Ysaye Mosbaugh, was a noted concert pianist who toured Europe with José Iturbi before settling down in Canada. She also hosted and performed on a classical radio show on CKAR Radio in Huntsville, Ontario. Ysaÿe's great-grandson, Franc Mosbaugh, is a Canadian musician/singer and award-winning commercial jingle composer.

Ysaÿe was also a friend of Claude Debussy and would sometimes correspond with him by letter. The two had great respect for each other and Ysaÿe was a significant supporter of the younger composer's early career. Debussy dedicated his only string quartet to the violinist, who studied the score with great care. The quartet received its premiere on 29 December 1893 by the Ysaÿe Quartet at the Société Nationale in Paris, to mixed reviews. The virtuoso and the composer also corresponded during the writing of Debussy's Nocturnes.

== Legend of the Ysaÿe violin ==
Eugène Ysaÿe came from a background of "artisans", though a large part of his family played instruments. As violinist Arnold Steinhardt recounts, a legend was passed down through the Ysaÿe family about the first violin brought to the lineage:

It was told of a boy whom some woodcutters found in the forest and brought to the village. The boy grew up to be a blacksmith. Once, at a village festival, he astonished everyone by playing the viol beautifully. From then on the villagers took pleasure in dancing and singing to the strains of his viol. One day an illustrious stranger stopped in front of the smithy to have his horse shod. The count's servant saw the viol inside and told the young smith that he had heard a new Italian instrument played by some minstrels at the count's court. That instrument, called the violin, was much better than the viol – its tone was like the human voice and could express every feeling and passion. From that moment the young man no longer took pleasure in his viol. Day and night he was thinking of that wonderful new instrument that could express joy and sorrow and whose tones went straight to the human heart. Then he had a dream: he saw before him a young woman of indescribable beauty, not unlike his own love, Biethline. She came to him and kissed his brow. The young man awoke and looked at the wall his broken and neglected viol used to hang on and could barely believe his eyes: there, instead of the viol, was a new instrument of beautiful proportions. He put it against his shoulder and drew the bow over the strings, producing sounds that were truly divine. The violin sang in a heartwarming tone: it rejoiced and wept for happiness – and so did the musician. Thus, goes the legend, came the first violin to the Ardennes and to the Ysaÿe family.

== The Eugène Ysaÿe Collection ==
The Eugène Ysaÿe Collection, housed in the Music Division of the Royal Library of Belgium, combines four decades of purchases with a donation made by the Ysaÿe family in 2007. An essential source for the study of musician's life and works, it includes some 700 letters and autograph scores, over 1,000 printed scores and books, abundant collection of photographs, four films, and about fifty 78 RPM and 33 RPM recordings. A second collection of handwritten and printed scores is conserved in New York at the Juilliard School.

== Honours ==
- 1900: Officer in the Order of Leopold.
- 1919: Commander of the Order of Leopold.

== List of compositions ==
=== Works for solo violin ===
- 6 Sonatas for solo violin, Op. 27 (each dedicated to a different famous violinist and written in their corresponding styles)
  - Sonata No. 1 ("Joseph Szigeti")
  - Sonata No. 2 ("Jacques Thibaud")
  - Sonata No. 3 ("Georges Enescu")
  - Sonata No. 4 ("Fritz Kreisler")
  - Sonata No. 5 ("Mathieu Crickboom")
  - Sonata No. 6 ("Manuel Quiroga")
- 10 Preludes (Exercises for violin), Op. 35
- Étude posthume
- Cadenza for Beethoven, Violin Concerto in D major, Op. 61, 1st mov. (1888–89)
- Cadenza for Mozart, Violin Concerto No. 3 in G major, K. 216, 1st, 2nd and 3rd mov.
- Cadenza for Tchaikovsky, Violin Concerto in D major, Op. 35, 1st mov.
- Cadenza for Brahms, Violin Concerto in D major, Op. 77, 1st mov.

=== Works for violin and piano ===
- Scènes Sentimentales (1885) [ms discovered in 2012]
- 2 Mazurkas de Salon, Op. 10 (c. 1893)
  1. Dans le lointain (Tempo di Mazurka)
  2. Mazurka, in A minor (Moderato) [orchestrated by Allan Wilson]
- Lointain passé, Mazurka No. 3 in B minor, Op. 11 (1893)
- Petite fantaisie romantique (c. 1901)
- Poème élégiaque, for violin and piano (1892/3) [revised as Poème No. 1 in D minor, for violin and orchestra, Op. 12]
- Rêve d'enfant, in A♭ major, for violin and piano (or orchestra) Op. 14
- Untitled piece in F♯ minor (c. 1912) [ms discovered in 2012, ending missing, completed and entitled Élégie, by Sherban Lupu]
- Trois Études-Poèmes (completed 1924) [mss discovered in 2012]
  1. Sérénade, in G minor (Allegretto poco scherzando) [ms piano part missing, piano accompaniment written by Sabin Pautza]
  2. Au ruisseau (Poco lento)
  3. Cara memoria, in E♭ minor (Molto moderato alla marcia funèbre)
- "Paganini Variations", on 24th Caprice (published 1960)
- "Caprice after the Study in the form of a Waltz, Op. 52/6" (composed by Camille Saint-Saëns, arranged by Ysaÿe)
- Deux célèbres Arias (composed by J.S. Bach and G.F. Handel, arranged by Ysaÿe)
- Waltz in E minor Op. posth. [KKIVa/15] (composed by Frédéric Chopin, arranged by Ysaÿe)
- Ballade No. 1 in G minor, Op. 23 (composed by Frédéric Chopin, arranged by Ysaÿe)
- Légende norvégienne.

=== Chamber works ===
- String Quintet, in B minor, for 2 violins, 2 violas and cello "à mon frère Théophile" (1894) [Grave et lent – Allegro] [later arranged for violin and piano/orchestra Op. 15]
- Sonata for solo cello, in C minor, Op. 28 (1924) [1. Grave; 2. Intermezzo; 3. In modo di Recitativo; 4. Finale. Con brio]
- Sonata for two violins, in A minor, Op. posth. (1915) [1. Poco lento, maestoso – Allegro fermo; 2. Allegretto poco lento; 3. Finale. Allegro vivo e con fuoco)
- String Trio No. 1, Op. 33, a.k.a. "Le Chimay" (1927) [Molto lento – Allegro non troppo – Lento ben sostenuto – Allegro non-troppo – Allegro poco presto]
- String Trio No. 2, Op. 34 (1927) [Allegro assai – Lento]
- Trio “Le Londres” for 2 violins and viola
- String Quartet
- "Paganini Variations" for String Quartet

=== Orchestral works ===
- Brabançonne in D major, for orchestra (1918)
- Exil, for string orchestra without double basses, Op. 25 (1917)

=== Concertante works ===
- Poème élégiaque (Poème No. 1) in D minor, for violin and orchestra Op. 12 (1902/3) [orchestrated by Jacques Ysaye]
- Au rouet (Poème No. 2), for violin and orchestra, Op. 13
- Chant d'hiver (Poème No. 3), in B minor, for violin and orchestra (or piano), Op. 15 (1902) [same music of String Quintet]
- Méditation, for cello and orchestra, Op. 16
- Violin Concerto No. ?, in G minor, for violin and orchestra, Op. 17 (1893,1901,1908,1910) [mss discovered in 2012, reconstructed from 4 ms versions by Sherban Lupu and orchestrated by Sabin Pautza in 2017]
- Berceuse, in F minor, for violin and orchestra, Op. 20
- Extase (Poème No. 4), for violin and orchestra, Op. 21 (dedicated to Mischa Elman)
- Sérénade, for cello and orchestra, Op. 22
- Les neiges d'antan (Poème No. 5), for violin and orchestra, Op. 23 (1911)
- Divertimento, for violin and orchestra (or piano) Op. 24 (1921) [1. Molto moderato; 2. Allegro non-troppo vivo]
- Amitié (Poème No. 6), for 2 violins and orchestra, Op. 26
- Poème nocturne (Poème No. 7), for violin, cello and orchestra, Op. 29
- Harmonies du soir (Poème No. 8), for string quartet and orchestra, Op. 31
- Fantasia, for violin and orchestra, Op. 32
- Violin Concerto No. 8 (orchestrated by Jacques Ysaÿe) [I. Grave e lento poco mesto; II. Andante non-troppo; III. (with no tempo indication)]
- Violin Concerto No. ?, in E minor, for violin and orchestra [I. Allegro appassionato non troppo vivo]
- Saltarelle carnavalesque, in A minor, for violin and orchestra (or piano), Op. posth

=== Operas ===
- Piére li houyeû (Pierre le mineur) 1931 (Original in Walloon language, perhaps the only opera composed for a libretto in that language)

The première of Piére li houyeû (the composer's only opera) took place at the Opéra de Liège on 4 March 1931, during a long evening dedicated to the composer's works, in the presence of Queen Elisabeth of Belgium who had been his pupil. Ysaÿe, very ill with diabetes, listened to the performance from his hospital room. The Queen, informed of the seriousness of Ysaÿe's condition, had organised a radio broadcast of the work and Ysaÿe addressed the audience from his room. The work was then performed in Brussels on 25 April. Ysaÿe, transported on a stretcher to a box in the theater, was able to view the performance. He died 18 days later.

The critics were appreciative but the opera did not find a place in the standard repertoire. It was performed again by Opéra Royal de Wallonie in Liege, 25 November 2006. This performance was recorded and is published by the non-profit association in a two CD set accompanied by a book containing the Walloon text and its French, Dutch and English translations, and introductory texts in French, Dutch, German and English. The story is based on an incident that occurred in 1877 during a miners' strike in the Liège region. During clashes with the police, some shots were fired. The wife of a foreman rushed forward to seize a grenade which had been placed in the offices by a striker, but the grenade exploded and she was killed.

- L’avièrge di pièr (La vierge de pierre) – not completed, not performed

A complete list of available orchestral works, including concerto works, is available on the Symphony Orchestra Library Center.

== Selected discography ==
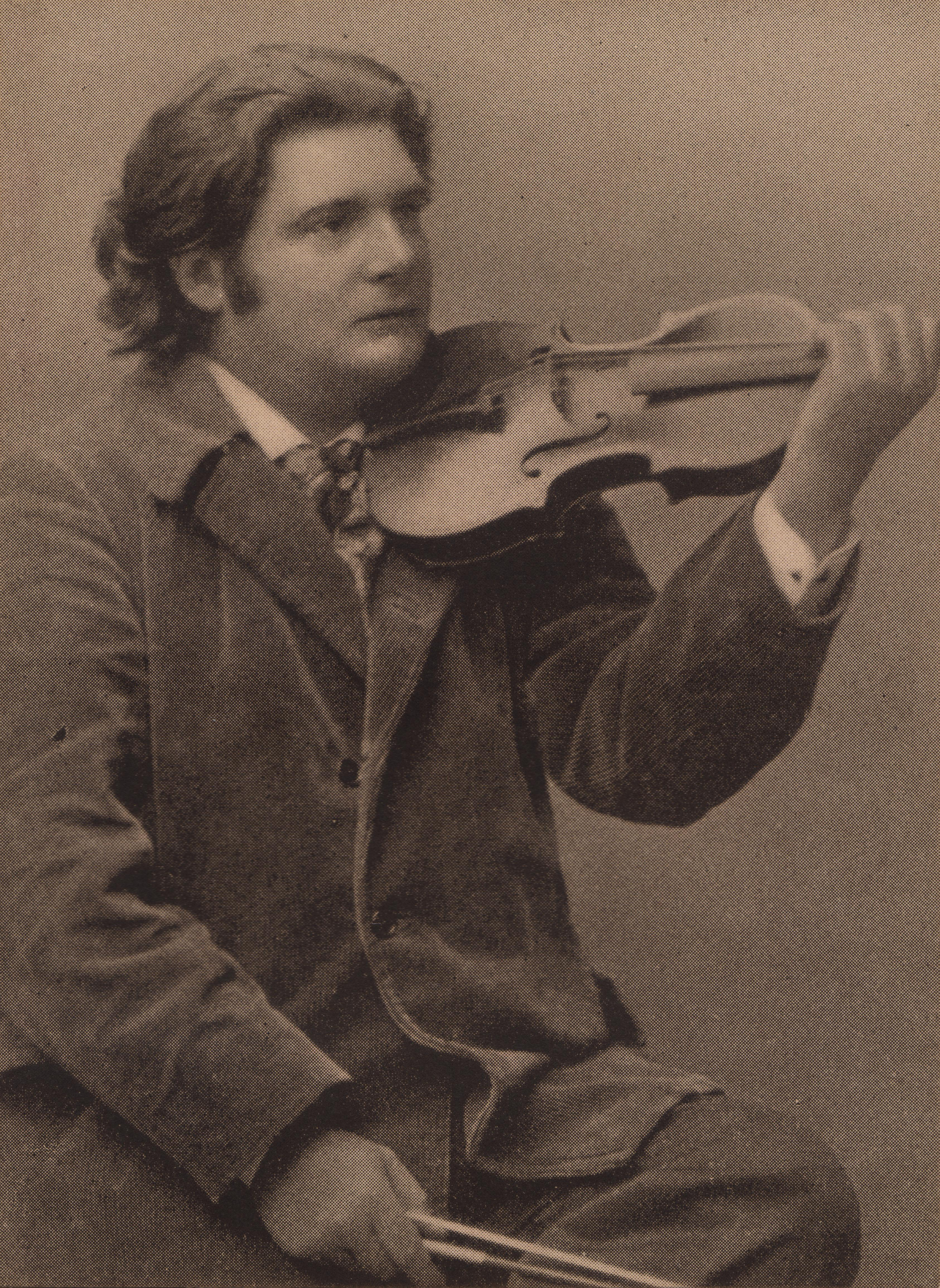
Eugène Ysaÿe

[Released on CD, Sony Classical MHK 62337, 1996]

=== Camille de Creus, piano accompaniment ===
- R. Wagner: Prize Song from Die Meistersinger Von Nürnberg, recorded 1 Feb.1912
- E. Chabrier: Pièce pittoresque No.10 from Scherzo-Valse, recorded 20 Dec.1912
- R. Schumann: Abendlied, Op.85, No.12 by Schumann, recorded 24 Dec.1912
- H. Wieniawski: Obertass, Mazurka Op.19, No.1 in G major, recorded 26 Dec.1912
- H. Wieniawski: Dudziarz, Mazurka Op.19, No.2 in D major, recorded 26 Dec.1912
- G. Fauré: Berceuse Op.16, recorded 27 Dec.1912
- F. Mendelssohn: Concerto for Violin and Orchestra in E minor Op.64 (III: Allegro molto vivace), recorded 27 Dec.1912
- H. Vieuxtemps: Rondino Op.32, No.2, recorded 30 Dec.1912
- J. Brahms: Hungarian Dance No.5, in F♯ minor (arr. Joachim), recorded 30 Dec.1912
- F. Kreisler: Caprice Viennois, Op.2, recorded 30 Dec.1912
- R. Wagner: Albumblatt in C major, recorded 30 Dec.1912
- E. Ysaÿe: Lointain passé, Mazurka No.3 in B minor Op.11, recorded 1 Feb.1913
- E. Ysaÿe: Rêve d'Enfant Op.14, recorded 1 Feb.1913
- A. Dvořák: Humoresque in G♭ major Op.101, No.7 (arr. Kreisler), recorded 9 Mar.1914
- F. Schubert: Ave Maria D.839, recorded 9 Mar.1914
- E. Chabrier: Marche Joyeuse, recorded 30 Nov.1919

=== Conducting the Cincinnati Symphony Orchestra, recorded 28 Nov 1919 ===
- L. Delibes: Intermezzo from 'Naila' (Pas Des Fleurs, Grande Valse)
- Aimé Maillart: Overture to Les Dragons De Villars
- J. Massenet: Navarraise from 'Le Cid', by Massenet
- Eduard Lassen: Festival Overture
- E. Chabrier: Marche Joyeuse
- N. Rimsky-Korsakov: Scheherazade
- J. Offenbach: Orpheus in Hades
