= Violin Concerto No. 1 (Saint-Saëns) =

Concerto for violin and orchestra by Camile Saint-Saëns

Violin Concerto
- by Camille Saint-Saëns
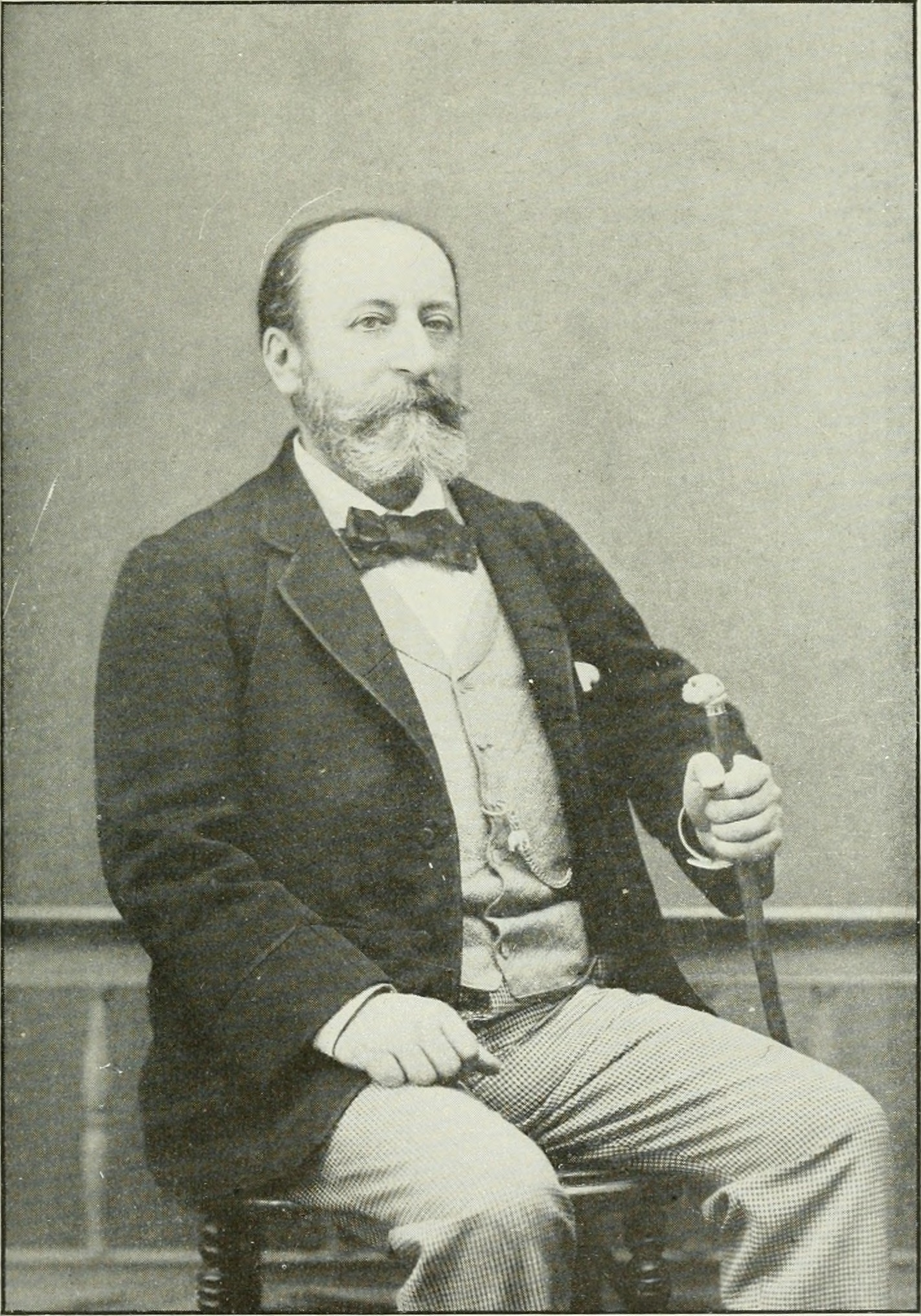
- Key: A Major
- Opus: 20
- Period: Romantic
- Genre: Concerto
- Composed: 1859
- Movements: 1
- Scoring: Violin & Orchestra

Premiere
- Date: April 4, 1867
- Location: Paris
- Conductor: Camille Saint-Saëns
- Performers: Pablo de Sarasate, Paris Philharmonic

The Violin Concerto No. 1 in A major, Op. 20, by Camille Saint-Saëns is a piece for violin and orchestra written in 1859 and premiered in 1867 in Paris. Despite its numbering, this concerto was Saint-Saëns' second for the violin because it was published first. This was the first in a string of collaborations with virtuoso violinist Pablo Sarasate, who was only 15 years old at the time. This concerto, along with No. 2 and No. 3, would result in a lifelong friendship and collaboration between Saint-Saëns and Sarasate. The work never gained much popularity during Saint-Saëns' lifetime, to his disappointment.

== Instrumentation ==
The work is scored for solo violin, 2 flutes/piccolo, 2 oboes, 2 clarinets, 2 bassoons, 2 horns, 2 trumpets, timpani, and strings.

== Structure ==
The work is in only a single movement, labeled allegro.

The piece has a performance time of approximately 12 minutes, garnering criticism for its short length. Critics called the work a 'concert piece' because it is barely longer than other works of that label, much to the annoyance of Saint-Saëns himself.

== Notable recordings ==
- Ruggiero Ricci, violin, Cincinnati Symphony Orchestra, conductor Max Rudolf. Record 1965
- Ivry Gitlis, violin, (with concerto n°4, op.62, unfinished), Orchestre National de Mont Carlo, conductor Edouard Van Remoortel. LP Philipps 1968 report CD 1998
- Ulf Hoelscher, violin, Complete Violin Concertos (n°1, n°2, n°3), New Philharmonia Orchestra, conductor Pierre Dervaux. Recorded 1977. 2 CD Brillant Classics 2012
- Philippe Graffin, violin, Complete Violin Concertos (n°1, n°2, n°3), Scottish Symphony Orchestra, conductor Martyn Brabbins. CD Hyperion 1998
- Fanny Clamagirand, violin, Complete Violin Concertos (n°1, n°2, n°3), Finlandia Jyväskilä, conductor Patrick Gallois. CD Naxos 2009
- Andrew Wan, violin, Complete Violin Concertos (n°1, n°2, n°3), Orchestre symphonique de Montréal, conductor Kent Nagano. CD Analekta 2015
