= Violin Sonata (Franck) =

1886 composition by César Franck

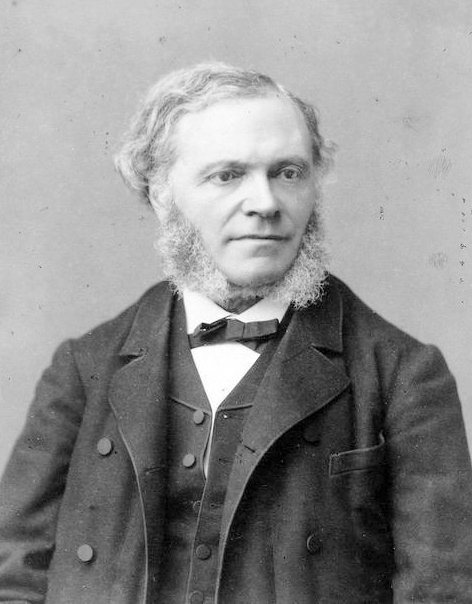
César Franck, photographed by Pierre Petit, 1887

The Sonata in A major for Violin and Piano by César Franck is one of his best-known compositions, and is considered one of the finest sonatas for violin and piano ever written. It is an amalgam of his rich native harmonic language with the Classical traditions he valued highly, held together in a cyclic framework.

== Background ==
The Violin Sonata in A was written in 1886, when César Franck was 63, as a wedding present for the 28-year-old violinist Eugène Ysaÿe. Twenty-eight years earlier, in 1858, Franck had promised a violin sonata for Cosima von Bülow. This never appeared; it has been speculated that whatever work Franck had done on that piece was put aside, and eventually ended up in the sonata he wrote for Ysaÿe in 1886.

Franck was not present when Ysaÿe married, but on the morning of the wedding, on 26 September 1886 in Arlon, their mutual friend Charles Bordes presented the work as Franck's gift to Ysaÿe and his bride Louise Bourdeau de Courtrai. After a hurried rehearsal, Ysaÿe and Bordes' sister-in-law, the pianist Marie-Léontine Bordes-Pène, played the Sonata to the other wedding guests.

The Sonata was given its first public concert performance on 16 December of that year, at the Musée Moderne de Peinture in Brussels. Ysaÿe and Bordes-Pène were again the performers. The Sonata was the final item in a long program which started at 3pm. When the time arrived for the Sonata, dusk had fallen and the gallery was bathed in gloom, but the museum authorities permitted no artificial light whatsoever. Initially, it seemed the Sonata would have to be abandoned, but Ysaÿe and Bordes-Pène decided to continue regardless. They had to play the last three movements from memory in virtual darkness. When the violinist Armand Parent remarked that Ysaÿe had played the first movement faster than the composer intended, Franck replied that Ysaÿe had made the right decision, saying "from now on there will be no other way to play it". Vincent d'Indy, who was present, recorded these details of the event.

Ysaÿe kept the Violin Sonata in his repertoire for the next 40 years of his life, with a variety of pianists, like Théo Ysaÿe, Ernest Chausson, Ferruccio Busoni, Vincent d'Indy, Raoul Pugno, Camille Decreus, Arthur De Greef, Leopold Godowsky, Yves Nat, and many others. His championing of the Sonata contributed to the public recognition of Franck as a major composer. This recognition was quite belated; Franck died within four years of the Sonata's public première, and did not have his first unqualified public success until the last year of his life on 19 April 1890, at the Salle Pleyel, where his String Quartet in D was premiered.

The Sonata in A regularly appears on concert programs and on recordings, and is in the core repertoire of all major violinists. Jascha Heifetz played it at his final recital in 1972.

The piece is further notable for the difficulty of its piano part, when compared with most of the chamber repertoire. Its technical problems include frequent extreme extended figures—the composer himself having possessed huge hands—and virtuoso runs and leaps, particularly in the second movement, though some passages can be facilitated by employing a spare hand to cover some notes.

== Structure ==
I. Allegretto ben moderato

II. Allegro

III. Recitativo-Fantasia: Ben moderato

IV. Allegretto poco mosso
Performed by Tibor Szomora and Minami Matsunaga

The work is cyclic in nature, all the movements sharing common thematic threads. Themes from one movement reappear in subsequent movements, but usually transformed. Franck had adapted this technique from Franz Liszt—his friend, and Cosima von Bülow's father. Vincent d'Indy described the Sonata as "the first and purest model of the cyclical use of themes in sonata form", and referred to it as "this true musical monument".

The movements alternate between slow and fast.

1. Allegretto ben moderato, 9/8
2. Allegro
3. Ben moderato: Recitativo-Fantasia
4. Allegretto poco mosso

In the first movement, the gentle and sweetly reflective rocking theme, introduced by the violin after a short introduction by the piano, is the thematic core of the entire work. Franck originally intended it as a slow movement, but Ysaÿe preferred a slightly quicker tempo, and convinced Franck to mark it Allegretto.

The turbulent second movement is sometimes considered the real opening movement, with the Allegretto ben moderato serving as a long introduction.

The third movement is improvisatory in nature, and free in both structure and expression.

In the final movement, the main melody is heard in canonic imitation between the instruments, and recurs in a rondo-like manner to a triumphant and soaring conclusion. James Harding described the movement as "a magnificent example of canonic writing, simple, majestic and irresistible in its ample, beautifully wrought proportions".

== Transcriptions ==
Arrangement for flute and piano
I. Allegretto moderato

II. Allegro

III. Ben moderato: Recitativo-Fantasia

IV. Allegretto poco mosso
Performed by Albert Tipton (flute) and Mary Norris (piano)

Jean-Pierre Rampal made a transcription for flute and piano that is still performed frequently. The Violin Sonata in A also exists in versions for cello; viola; double bass; oboe; clarinet; alto saxophone; tuba; organ with choir; violin and strings; and violin and orchestra most famously recorded by Leonid Kogan. A version for piano duet by the pianist and composer Alfred Cortot has been recorded several times. Cortot also made a version for solo piano.

The setting for cello and piano was the only alternative version sanctioned by Franck. This was created by the renowned cellist Jules Delsart. After thorough historical study based on reliable documents, Delsart's transcription for cello where the piano part remains the same as in the violin sonata was published by G. Henle Verlag as an Urtext edition. Based on oral history by Pablo Casals and a letter written by Antoine Ysaye, Eugène Ysaÿe's son, it has often been speculated that the work was first conceived as a sonata for cello and piano, and only later reset for violin and piano when the commission from Eugène Ysaÿe arrived.

== Recordings ==
The Violin Sonata in A by César Franck has been recorded by many great violinist/pianist duos. Among them are:

- Lisa Batiashvili with Giorgi Gigashvili
- Joshua Bell with Jean-Yves Thibaudet
- Lola Bobesco with Jacques Genty
- Renaud Capuçon with Alexandre Gurning and with Martha Argerich
- Kyung-wha Chung with Radu Lupu
- Kaja Danczowska with Krystian Zimerman
- Augustin Dumay with Maria João Pires
- James Ehnes with Andrew Armstrong
- Isabelle Faust with Alexander Melnikov
- Christian Ferras with Pierre Barbizet
- Zino Francescatti with Robert Casadesus
- Erick Friedman with André Previn
- Ivry Gitlis with Martha Argerich
- Arthur Grumiaux (multiple recordings)
- Jascha Heifetz with Arthur Rubinstein and with Brooks Smith
- Alina Ibragimova with Cédric Tiberghien
- Sergey Khachatryan with Luisine Khachatryan
- Yehudi Menuhin with Hephzibah Menuhin
- Shlomo Mintz with Yefim Bronfman
- Anne-Sophie Mutter with Alexis Weissenberg (1983) and with Lambert Orkis (1996);
- Takako Nishizaki with Jenő Jandó
- David Oistrakh with Lev Oborin, also with Sviatoslav Richter, and with Vladimir Yampolsky
- Elmar Oliveira with Jonathan Feldman
- Itzhak Perlman with Martha Argerich and with Vladimir Ashkenazy
- Ossy Renardy with Eugene List
- Vadim Repin with Nikolai Lugansky
- Aaron Rosand with Seymour Lipkin
- Gil Shaham with Gerhard Oppitz
- Isaac Stern with Alexander Zakin
- Josef Suk with Jan Panenka
- Henryk Szeryng with Mindru Katz
- Gerhard Taschner with Walter Gieseking
- Jacques Thibaud with Alfred Cortot

Violist Tabea Zimmermann released a recording of it arranged for viola and piano with pianist Kirill Gerstein.

Among the recordings of the version for cello and piano are:

- Jacqueline du Pré with Daniel Barenboim (du Pré's last recording)
- Maria Kliegel with Jörg Demus
- Ofra Harnoy with Cyprien Katsaris
- Steven Isserlis with Pascal Devoyon
- Yo-Yo Ma with Kathryn Stott
- Mischa Maisky with Martha Argerich
- Leonard Rose with Leonid Hambro
- Daniel Müller-Schott with Robert Kulek
- Sonia Wieder-Atherton with Imogen Cooper
- Truls Mørk with Håkon Austbø
- Edgar Moreau with David Kadouch

Double bassist Mikyung Sung released a recording based on the Delsart cello transcription with pianist Jaemin Shin.

The flute and piano version has been recorded by:

- William Bennett and Clifford Benson
- Albert Tipton and Mary Norris
- Jean-Pierre Rampal and Pierre Barbizet
- James Galway and Martha Argerich
- Aurèle Nicolet and Boris Berman
- Sharon Bezaly and Vladimir Ashkenazy
- Marina Piccinini and Andreas Haefliger
- Emmanuel Pahud and Éric Le Sage
- Jeffrey Khaner and Hugh Sung

Some transcriptions for oboe and clarinet have been made and recorded by David Walter and Michael Collins, respectively.

In 2020, a recording of a version for theremin and piano, played by Clara Rockmore and Nadia Reisenberg, was released as part of the album Music and Memories: Clara Rockmore.
