= Gerhard Taschner =

German violinist and teacher

Gerhard Taschner (25 May 1922 – 21 July 1976) was a noted German violinist and teacher.

== Biography ==
Taschner was born in Krnov (in German, Jägerndorf), Czechoslovakia, of Moravian origins. After studying with his grandfather, he played Mozart's Violin Concerto No. 5 at his debut in Prague, when aged only 7. He studied with Jenő Hubay in Budapest 1930-32, and with Bronisław Huberman and Adolf Bak in Vienna. At age 10, he played three concertos with the Vienna Symphony Orchestra under Felix Weingartner. By age 17, having undertaken tours in the United States and Germany, he was concertmaster at the City Theatre of Brno. In 1941, still aged only 19, he was chosen by Wilhelm Furtwängler as Concertmaster of the Berlin Philharmonic, while also forging a solo career. He attracted immediate attention, and his portrait was used on advertisements for the orchestra's upcoming programs.

In 1943, aged 21, he married the 37-year-old pianist Gerda Nette-Rothe. She then became known as Gerda Nette-Taschner.

In the dying days of the Second World War, the sacked German munitions minister Albert Speer devised a plan to protect the players of the Berlin Philharmonic from the invading Soviet forces. They would play a concert under Robert Heger and then be whisked away to a safe location out of Berlin. Gerhard Taschner played the Beethoven Violin Concerto. At the end of the concert, however, the players voted to remain in Berlin, in solidarity with their patrons, who were unable to escape. However, Taschner left in a car driven by Speer's chauffeur, taking with him his wife, two children, and the daughter of another musician. They took refuge in Thurnau. From 1946 to 1950 he lived in Rüdesheim am Rhein.

After the War he joined the pianist Walter Gieseking and the cellist Ludwig Hoelscher in a celebrated piano trio. He also played the violin-piano repertoire with Gieseking and Edith Farnadi and the concerto repertoire under conductors such as Karl Böhm, Georg Solti, Joseph Keilberth and Carl Schuricht. He was mainly responsible for making Khachaturian's Violin Concerto in D minor known in Germany, having had the score made available to him by the Soviets. In 1947 he made only the third recording of the work, after its dedicatee David Oistrakh in 1944 and Louis Kaufman in 1946.

Wolfgang Fortner dedicated his Violin Concerto to Gerhard Taschner. He premiered it in 1947 and went on to become its greatest champion. Fortner also dedicated his Violin Sonata to Taschner.

In 1948 Taschner played the Dvořák Violin Concerto in Vienna under Leonard Bernstein, who declined to invite him to the United States at that time.

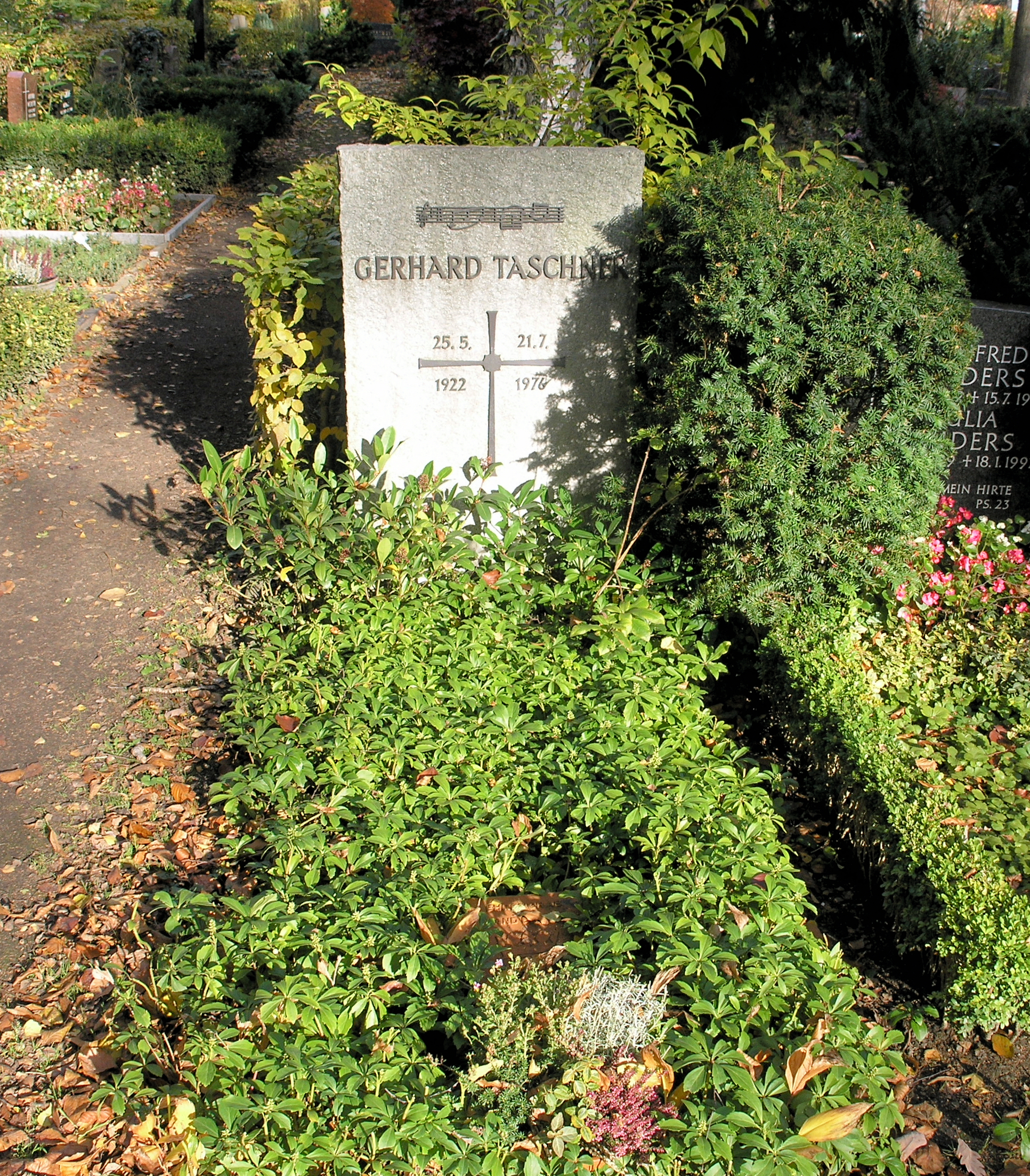
Gravesite of Gerhard Taschner

His personal nature was difficult and uncompromising, often leading to irreparable rifts with students, peers and others. He had very strong and inflexible ideas which sometimes put him at odds with conductors and composers. In 1944 he suggested to Jean Sibelius that the final movement of his Violin Concerto in D minor be played more slowly than the composer had indicated; a suggestion not taken up by Sibelius. During a rehearsal in the late 1940s, he and the conductor Herbert von Karajan were unable to agree on some matters of artistic interpretation, which led to Taschner storming out of the rehearsal and refusing to play the concert; the two never played together again.

In 1950 Taschner was appointed a professor at the Musikhochschule in Berlin. He also concertised internationally; in South America he was dubbed "the Manolete of the violin". In Europe, he was seen as the successor to Adolf Busch, Huberman and Fritz Kreisler.

A back condition caused his withdrawal from the concert platform in the early 1960s when still aged only 40. He continued to teach and play chamber music, and served on various competition juries such as the 1957 Henryk Wieniawski Competition in Poznan; the 1957 and 1959 Marguerite Long-Jacques Thibaud Competition in Paris, the 1960 Paganini Competition in Genoa and the 1963 Queen Elisabeth Competition in Brussels.

Gerhard Taschner died in Berlin in 1976, aged 54. He is buried in the III. Municipal cemetery Stubenrauchstraße in Berlin-Friedenau.

== Posthumous reputation ==
Taschner never had a major recording contract. However, he made numerous radio broadcasts and many of these recordings have been re-released, or released for the first time, leading to a latter-day following. Many of the radio recordings were confiscated by the invading Soviet forces at the end of the war, and came to light only after their return in 1991.

Critical reaction to these recordings varies considerably: one critic compares him with Jascha Heifetz, Bronisław Huberman, Nathan Milstein and Ginette Neveu when it comes to intensity of expression and richness in sound colours, but another says he is not in the same league as Joseph Szigeti, Isolde Menges, Emil Telmányi or Szymon Goldberg.

Of his recording of the Ravel Violin Sonata, one critic says: Taschner projects the Ravel Sonata's jazz-tinged nuances to perfection, but another says His Ravel sonata misses the jazzy comical element and is rather straightforward and serious.

The Berlin University of the Arts created the "Gerhard Taschner Prize for Violin" in his honour.

There is a biography of him: Gerhard Taschner – das vergessene Genie. Eine Biographie, by Klaus Weiler.

== Recordings ==
Gerhard Taschner's recordings include:

- J.S. Bach: Chaconne from Partita No. 2, BWV 1004
- Beethoven: Violin Concerto in D major, Op. 61 (with the Berlin Philharmonic under Georg Solti)
  - Berlin Radio Symphony Orchestra under Paul Rother
- Beethoven: Kreutzer Sonata (with Walter Gieseking)
- Beethoven: Spring Sonata; Sonata No. 3 in E flat, Op. 12/3 (with Edith Fernadi)
- Brahms: Violin Sonata No. 1 in G major, Op. 78 (with Martin Krause)
- Brahms: Violin Sonata No. 3 in D minor, Op. 108 (with Gieseking)
- Bruch: Violin Concerto No. 1 in G minor, Op. 26:
  - under Hermann Abendroth
  - Stuttgart Radio Symphony Orchestra under Hans Müller-Kray
- Dvořák: Sonatina in G major, Op. 100, B. 183
- Blair Fairchild: Mosquitos
- Wolfgang Fortner: Violin Concerto (ded. Taschner)
  - Berlin Philharmonic under Wilhelm Furtwängler
  - Southwest German Radio Symphony Orchestra under Hans Rosbaud
- Franck: Violin Sonata in A major (with Gieseking)
- Franck: Violin Sonata in A major (with Cor de Groot, 1942)
- Gershwin: Short Story
- Grieg: C minor and G major sonatas
- Handel: Sonata Op. 1, No. 13 (with Cor de Groot)
- Khachaturian: Violin Concerto in D minor
  - Berlin Radio Symphony Orchestra under Artur Rother
  - North German Radio Symphony Orchestra under Hans Schmidt-Isserstedt
- Kreisler: Praeludium and Allegro
- Paganini: Sonata No. 12 (with Gerda Nette-Taschner)
- Pfitzner: Violin Concerto in B minor, Op. 34 (Berlin Radio Symphony Orchestra under Rudolf Kempe)
- Ravel: Violin Sonata
- Sarasate: Zigeunerweisen (with Michael Raucheisen)
- Sarasate: Carmen Fantasy (Bamberg Symphony under Fritz Lehmann)
- Sarasate: Romanza Andaluza, Op. 22/1 (with Gerda Nette-Taschner)
- Schoeck: Violin Sonata in D major, Op. 16
- Sibelius: Violin Concerto (Cologne Radio Symphony Orchestra)
- Tartini: Devil's Trill Sonata (with Hubert Giesen)
- On a recording of the Tchaikovsky Violin Concerto in D major with the Berlin Symphony Orchestra under Joseph Balzer, the soloist was identified as "Fritz Malachowsky", but this is believed to in fact be Gerhard Taschner.
