= Violin Concerto No. 3 (Saint-Saëns) =

Musical composition by Saint-Saëns

Violin Concerto
- by Camille Saint-Saëns
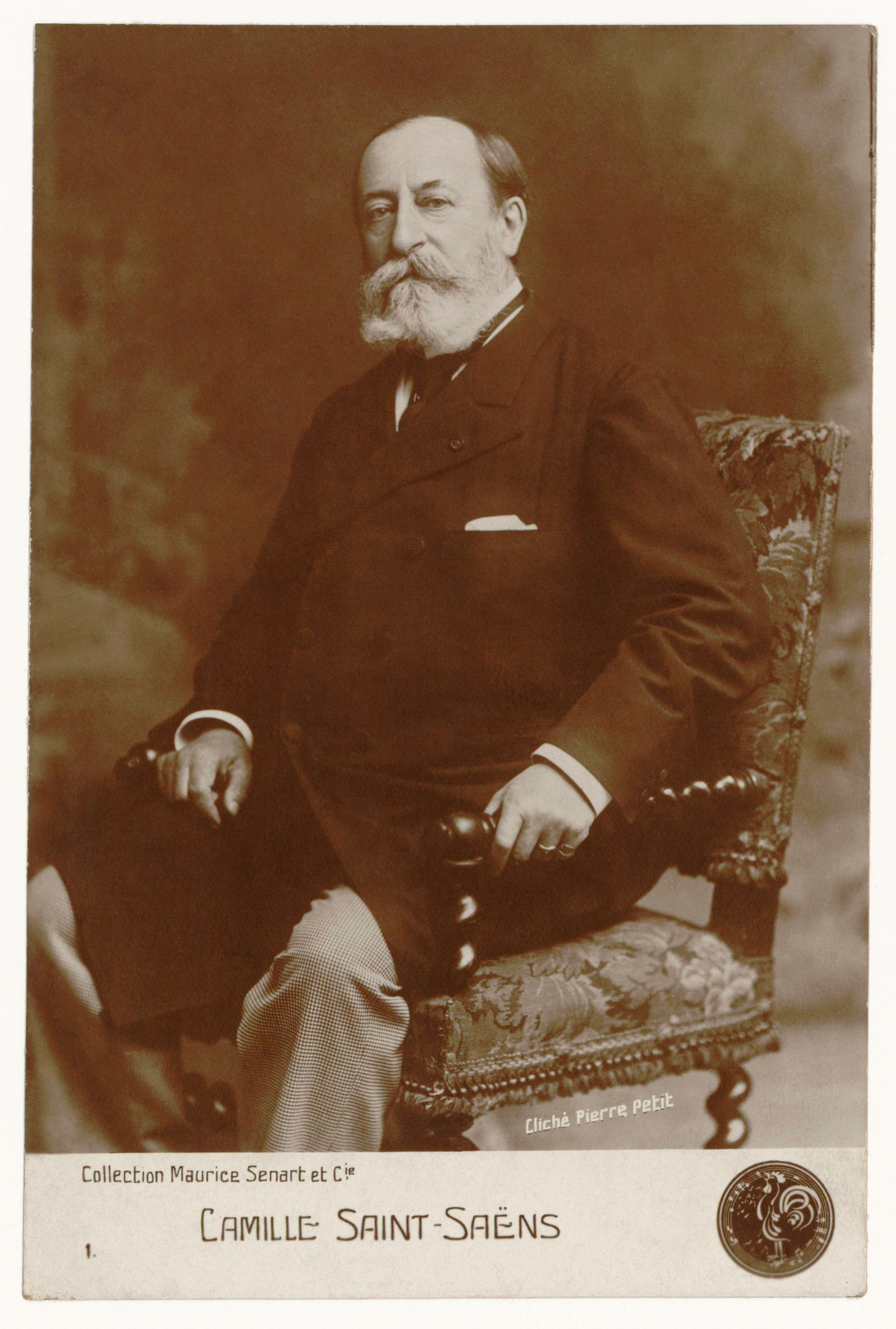
- Key: B minor
- Opus: 61
- Period: Romantic
- Genre: Concerto
- Composed: 1880
- Movements: 3
- Scoring: Violin & Orchestra

Premiere
- Date: October 15, 1880
- Location: Hamburg
- Conductor: Adolf Georg Beer
- Performers: Pablo de Sarasate, Philharmonisches Orchester Hamburg

The Violin Concerto No. 3 in B minor, Op. 61, by Camille Saint-Saëns is a piece for violin and orchestra written in March 1880. Saint-Saëns dedicated the concerto to fellow composer-virtuoso Pablo de Sarasate, who performed the solo part at the premiere in October 1880 in Hamburg.

Even though the third violin concerto seems to impose fewer technical demands on the soloist than its predecessors, its melodic invention and impressionistic subtlety present significant interpretive challenges. This stress is most notable in the second movement and the chorale of the finale, which is reminiscent of the conclusion of the Fourth Piano Concerto. Possibly because of this, the Third Concerto along with the Introduction and Rondo Capriccioso, Op. 28, and the Havanaise, Op. 83 have endured as the major concertante works for violin by Saint-Saëns still heard regularly today.

== Music ==
The work is scored for solo violin, 2 flutes/piccolo, 2 oboes, 2 clarinets, 2 bassoons, 2 horns, 2 trumpets, 3 trombones, timpani, and strings.

I. Allegro non troppo

II. Andantino quasi allegretto

III. Molto moderato e maestoso – Allegro non troppo
Performed by Zino Francescatti and the New York Philharmonic, under the baton of Dimitri Mitropoulos

The work is in three movements:

1. Allegro non troppo
2. Andantino quasi allegretto
3. Molto moderato e maestoso – Allegro non troppo

A performance of the whole piece takes around 28 minutes.

== Selected recordings ==
- Zino Francescati, violin, The Philharmonic Symphony Orchestra of New York, conductor Dimitri Mitropoulos. Recorded 1950. CD Sony 1996
- Arthur Grumiaux, violin, Orchestre des Concerts Lamoureux, conductor Jean Fournet. LP Philips 1957
- Nathan Milstein, violin, The Philharmonia Orchestra, dir. Anatole Fistoulari. LP Columbia Emi 1962
- Arthur Grumiaux, violin, Orchestre des Concerts Lamoureux, conductor Manuel Rosenthal. Recorded 1963. CD Classic best 1200, 2016
- Henrik Szeryng, violin, Orchestre National de l'Opéra de Monte Carlo, conductor Édouard Van Remoortel. Recorded 10/1969. CD Philips 1988
- Zino Francescatti, violin, New York Philharmonic, conductor Pierre Boulez. CD Lyrinx ( live recording 16/12/1975)
- Pierre Amoyal, violin, New Philharmonia Orchestra, conductor Vernon Handley. CD Erato 1977
- Ulf Hoelscher, violin, Complete Violin Concertos (n°1, n°2, n°3), , New Philharmonia Orchestra, conductor Pierre Dervaux. Recorded 1977 for EMI. Reissued by Brilliant Classics 2012
- Joshua Bell, violin, Orchestre Symphonique de Montréal, conductor Charles Dutoit. CD Decca 1989
- Isaac Stern, violin, Orchestre de Paris, conductor Daniel Barenboim. CD Sony 1995
- Pierre Amoyal, violin, Orchestre National de France, conductor Charles Dutoit. CD Decca 1995
- Chee-Yun, violin, London Philharmonic Orchestra, conductor Jesús López-Cobos. CD Denon 1997
- Stefan Tönz, violin, Academy of St Martin in the Fields, conductor Sir Neville Mariner. CD Novalis 1998
- Philippe Graffin, violin, Complete Violin Concertos (n°1, n°2, n°3),, BBC Scottish Symphony Orchestra, conductor Martyn Brabbins. CD Hyperion 1998
- Itzhak Perlman, violin, Orchestre de Paris, conductor, Daniel Barenboim. CD DG 2006
- Fanny Clamagirand, violin, Complete Violin Concertos (n°1, n°2, n°3), Sinfonia Finlandia Jyväskilä, conductor Patrick Gallois. CD Naxos 2009
- Renaud Capuçon, violin, Orchestre Philharmonique de Radio France, conductor Lionel Bringuier. CD Erato 2013
- Andrew Wan, violin, Complete Violin Concertos (n°1, n°2, n°3), Orchestre Symphonique de Montréal, conductor Kent Nagano. CD Analekta 2015
