= Violin Concerto No. 2 (Saint-Saëns) =

Concerto by Camille Saint-Saëns

Violin Concerto
- by Camille Saint-Saëns
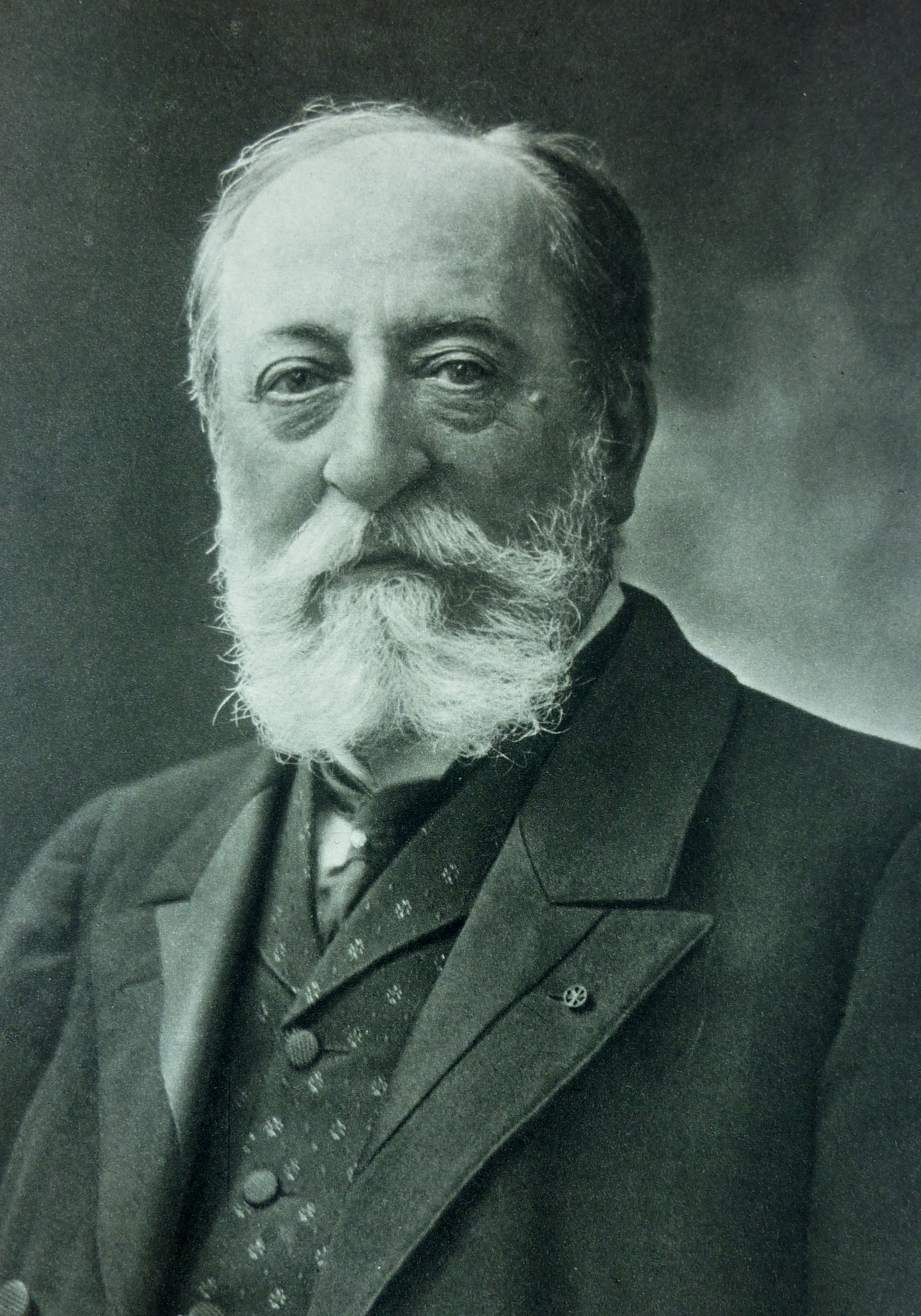
- Key: C major
- Opus: 58
- Period: Romantic
- Genre: Concerto
- Composed: 1858
- Movements: 3
- Scoring: Violin & Orchestra

Premiere
- Date: 1880

The Violin Concerto No. 2 in C major, Op. 58, by Camille Saint-Saëns, was the composer's first violin concerto, written in 1858, although it was published in 1879 and so is numbered second. It was premiered in 1880 with Pierre Marsick as soloist.

== Structure ==
The work is in three movements:

1. Allegro moderato e maestoso – a tempo più allegro
2. Andante espressivo
3. Allegro scherzando quasi allegretto

== Recordings ==
- Ivry Gitlis, violon, (with concerto n°4, op.62, unfinished), Orchestre National de Mont Carlo, conductor Edouard Van Remoortel. LP Philipps 1968 report CD 1998
- Ulf Hoelscher, violin, Complete Violin Concertos (n°1, n°2, n°3), New Philharmonia Orchestra, conductor Pierre Dervaux. Recorded 1977. 2 CD Brillant Classics 2012
- Philippe Graffin, violin, Complete Violin Concertos (n°1, n°2, n°3), Scottish Symphony Orchestra, conductor Martyn Brabbins. CD Hyperion 1998
- Fanny Clamagirand, violin, Complete Violin Concertos (n°1, n°2, n°3), Finlandia Jyväskilä, conductor Patrick Gallois. CD Naxos 2009
- Andrew Wan, violin, Complete Violin Concertos (n°1, n°2, n°3), Orchestre symphonique de Montréal, conductor Kent Nagano. CD Analekta 2015
