= Suvi Raj Grubb =

Suvi Raj Grubb (7 October 1917 – 22 December 1999) was a South-Indian record producer who worked for EMI during the mid-20th Century, initially as assistant to Walter Legge, succeeding Legge on his resignation from EMI in 1964. He was accounted one of the foremost tonmeisters in the world by many contemporary musicians including Mstislav Rostropovich, Gerald Moore and Herbert von Karajan. He is widely acknowledged as a key figure in classical music recording from the 1960s up to his retirement in 1985.

Among his achievements was the discovery and promotion of the young Daniel Barenboim. He recorded many of the great classical musicians of the day including Otto Klemperer, Carlo Maria Giulini, Dame Janet Baker, André Previn (with whom he was nominated for the Grammy award for best orchestral recording in 1979) and Itzhak Perlman.

Grubb's knowledge of Western music was founded on his early experiences of Christian hymns in his youth in India, where he was an organist and choirmaster alongside his career which saw him studying a BSc at Madras University and working in a technical capacity for All India Radio. He emigrated to the United Kingdom with his wife, a medical doctor, in 1953, working freelance for the BBC, and in his spare time joined the Philharmonia Chorus. Through the Philharmonia he met Legge, who was the founder of the Philharmonia Orchestra, and was recruited to EMI after an exacting interview at which he demonstrated detailed knowledge of the Western classical repertoire.

His influence was such that in just three months he managed to arrange, book, record and release a record to celebrate the 70th birthday of accompanist Gerald Moore, including Yehudi Menuhin, Jacqueline du Pré, Daniel Barenboim, Dietrich Fischer-Dieskau, Victoria de los Ángeles, Elisabeth Schwarzkopf, Léon Goossens, Gervase de Peyer, and Nicolai Gedda. At one point these artists were queuing in the waiting room at EMI's studios for their allotted slots with Moore at the piano.

His close personal friendship with Barenboim led to the creation of a remarkable and poignant recording: in 1971, Jacqueline du Pré, Barenboim's wife, had already been diagnosed with multiple sclerosis and had not played for a year. On one day she pronounced that she was feeling somewhat fitter, and Barenboim telephoned Grubb who used his position in EMI to secure an empty studio at Abbey Road where, over two days, he recorded Barenboim and du Pré in Frédéric Chopin's Cello Sonata in G minor and César Franck's Violin Sonata in A arranged as a cello sonata. This was du Pré's last recording.

This period, from the mid-1960s to the mid-1980s, saw a change in the type of person entering the recording industry; technicians who were also appreciators of music were replaced with music graduates who were educated on the technical aspects. Grubb, as one of the old school, was an advocate of the naturalistic style of recording, where the aim was to faithfully reproduce the sound of a concert hall. Grubb was distinctly cool towards modernist music, and was a firm traditionalist. He counted Ralph Vaughan Williams and Benjamin Britten among his friends, but both these composers' styles had their roots in 19th Century classicism. He did, though, produce a number of important first recordings, including Dmitri Shostakovich's Lady Macbeth of Mtsensk and Manuel de Falla's Atlántida. He also produced recordings of works by Béla Bartók and a 1967 recording of Ferruccio Busoni's Piano Concerto played by John Ogdon; it appears that he was influenced in these choices by his friendship with and trust towards the many exceptional musicians with whom he worked.

Grubb retired in 1985, living first in Spain and returning to India in 1992. He died in Pune in 1999.

Grubb wrote a memoir entitled Music Makers on Record, for which Barenboim wrote an introduction.
