= Carmen Fantasy =

Carmen Fantasy may refer to:

- Carmen Fantasy (Sarasate), an 1881 fantasy by Pablo de Sarasate
- Carmen Fantasie (Waxman), a showpiece for violin and orchestra by Franz Waxman
