= Teresa Sterne =

American concert pianist and record producer (1927–2000)

- Born: March 29, 1927; Brooklyn, New York City
- Died: December 10, 2000 (aged 73); Manhattan, New York City
- Other name: Teresa Rosenbaum
- Occupation: Record executive

Teresa Sterne (also known as Teresa Rosenbaum and Tracey Sterne; March 29, 1927 – December 10, 2000) was an American concert pianist and record producer. Sterne's performance career began at the age of twelve when she appeared with the NBC Symphony and the New York Philharmonic Orchestra. Following her performance career, Sterne was director of Nonesuch Records from 1965 through 1979.

== Early life ==
Sterne was born in Brooklyn to a musical family. Her mother was a professional cellist who retired from her career to advance her daughter's musical development. Sterne's paternal uncle was a distinguished violinist who also helped develop her talents. She showed musical talent at an early age and was taken out of school at the age of 10 to be privately tutored and focus on the piano.

== Performance career ==
Sterne began performing at the age of eleven and made her professional debut at twelve when she performed Grieg's Piano Concerto with the NBC Symphony Orchestra at Madison Square Garden. The following year she performed Tchaikovsky's Piano Concerto No. 1 with the New York Philharmonic at Lewisohn Stadium in Harlem in front of nearly 6,000 people. The New York Times said of her performance, "Although several critics noted that the 13-year-old Ms. Sterne lacked the strength to fully handle the work's thundering octave passages, they uniformly praised her temperament, singing tone and impressive technique."

Sterne went on to perform many well known works. By the time she was fourteen, she had performed Bach's "Italian" Concerto and Mozart's Piano Concerto No. 20 to much acclaim. At sixteen, she gave a full recital at the Brooklyn Museum, where she performed Liszt's Hungarian Rhapsody No. 13, as well as works by Bach-von Bülow, Medtner, Debussy, Chopin and Beethoven. She again performed Rachmaninoff's Second Piano Concerto with the New York Philharmonic at Lewisohn Stadium at the age of 19.

== Transition away from performing ==
In her early twenties, Sterne's family began experiencing financial difficulties, so she set aside her performance career to work as a secretary in the offices of the impresario Sol Hurok, where she "nurtured the careers of other young artists." Her first job in the recording industry was in the customer service department of Columbia Records (now known as Sony Classical) where she was secretary and general assistant to Seymour Solomon at Vanguard Records for seven years. In 1965, Sterne became director of Nonesuch Records, a label that had been created the previous year as part of Jac Holzman's pop- and folk-oriented Elektra Records. Sterne died in her Manhattan apartment after suffering from Lou Gehrig’s disease.

== Nonesuch Records ==
When Sterne became director of Nonesuch Records, the label's function consisted mostly of buying the rights to European ensembles' recordings of Baroque music and reissuing them in the United States. She made a name for herself at Nonesuch by producing music that other major recording labels ignored, including American vernacular music, world music, and music by contemporary composers. She produced recordings by American composers George Crumb, Elliott Carter, Morton Subotnick, Charles Wuorinen and Donald Martino, and commissioned original music by them. She also issued important recordings of lesser-known works by Schoenberg, Busoni, and Stravinsky.
