= Uncommon Ritual =

Studio album by Edgar Meyer, Béla Fleck, Mike Marshall
- Released: September 30, 1997
- Recorded: November 1996, February 1997
- Genre: Classical
- Length: 77:31
- Label: Sony Classical
- Producer: Edgar Meyer and Béla Fleck, with association with Mike Marshall

Professional ratings
Review scores
Source	Rating
The Strad	(measured favorable)
Allmusic	3.5/5 stars

Uncommon Ritual is the second album released by Sony Classical of string trios, following Appalachia Waltz, with unusual instrumentation and influences from bluegrass and folk music to create an Americana-style of traditional classical music. Uncommon Ritual adds jazz, blues, and elements from world music to the mix. Regarding the genre-defying nature of the music, New York Times music critic Ben Ratliff wrote, "Despite its inclusion of Bach and Pablo de Sarasate's "Zigeunerweisen", Uncommon Ritual is not a classical album. But neither does it belong to bluegrass, traditional Irish music, jazz or any of the other traditions it lightly borrows from. It's sort of a chamberized health shake of music that's acceptable to a National Public Radio listenership: it comes with an unmistakable patina of culture, the pieces are brief and funny and the sound of the music is comfortably familiar." The trio includes double-bassist and composer Edgar Meyer, banjoist and composer Béla Fleck, and mandolin player Mike Marshall. The album is noted for the variety of instruments used, and the performers' ability to change instruments fluently within songs. The pairing of these three musicians was new for the recording of this album; however, Meyer and Fleck's musical relationship dates back to the mid '80s.

== Track listing ==
1. "Uncommon Ritual" (Edgar Meyer)
2. "Seesaw" (Béla Fleck)
3. "Sliding Down" (Meyer)
4. "Chromium Picolinate" (Meyer, Fleck)
5. "Contramonkey" (Meyer)
6. "Chance Meeting" (Meyer)
7. "Zigeunerweisen" (Pablo de Sarasate - arr: Mike Marshall, Meyer)
8. "Travis" (Fleck)
9. "Old Tyme" (Meyer)
10. "Contrapunctus VIII from The Art of the Fugue" (Johann Sebastian Bach - arr: Fleck, Marshall, Meyer)
11. Third movement from Amalgamations for solo bass (Meyer)
12. "By the River" (Meyer)
13. "Big Country" (Fleck)
14. "Barnyard Disturbance" (Meyer)
15. "In the Garden" (Meyer)
16. "Child's Play" (Marshall)
17. "The Big Cheese" (Fleck, Marshall, Meyer)

== Personnel ==
- Edgar Meyer, bass; piano and mandocello on "Sliding Down"
- Béla Fleck, banjo; mandolin on "Sliding Down"; guitar on "Sliding Down", "Travis", and "By the River"
- Mike Marshall, mandolin; mandocello on "Uncommon Ritual" and "Travis"; mandola on "Sliding Down", "Travis", and "In the Garden"; guitar on "Sliding Down" and "Big Country"
