= El vito =

Spanish traditional folk song and dance from Andalusia

"El Vito" is a traditional folk song and dance music of Andalusia whose origins can be traced back to the 16th century. Its name refers to Saint Vitus, patron of dancers. It was created in the nineteenth century as a dancing song typical of the bolero. It includes steps in the art of bullfighting and is usually played by women. The typical costume includes jacket and brimmed hat.

The melody of El vito is played fast in a 3/8 time signature, and it uses the harmonic minor scale for the ascending motives, and the phrygian mode, which is the most characteristic of Andalusian music, for the descending mode, which generates an harmonic accompaniment based on the Andalusian cadence. It is also sung with different lyrics, humorous or serious.

Pablo de Sarasate composed a "Vito" as part of his Spanish Dances, as well as briefly in an Allegretto section toward the end of his Airs espagnols, Op. 18.

It also serves as part of the melody for the "El Quinto Regimiento", an anthem of socialist and communist troops fighting on the Republican side during the Spanish Civil War.

Folk duo Esther & Abi Ofarim recorded a version of "El Vito" for their 1967 album 2 in 3.

The melody of John Coltrane's song "Olé" on his album Olé Coltrane is an interpolated version of "El Vito".

== See also ==
- Saint Vitus' dance
