= Marie-Léontine Bordes-Pène =

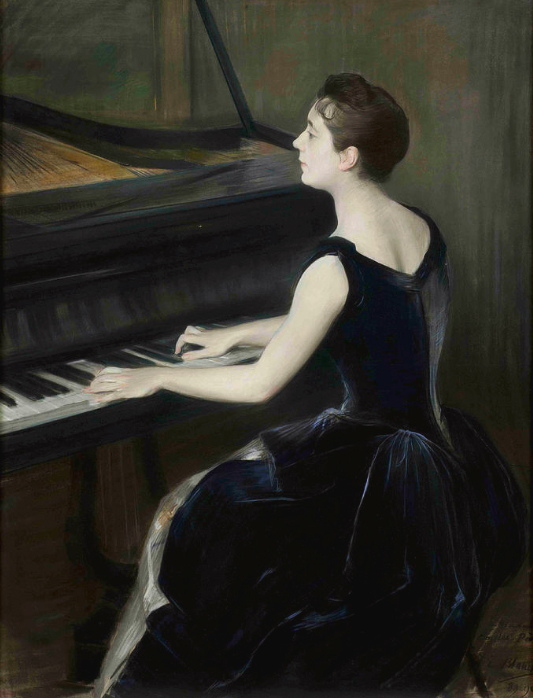
Portrait of Marie-Léontine Bordes-Pène (1890), by Jacques-Émile Blanche

Marie-Léontine Bordes-Pène (Léontine-Marie Pène) was a French pianist, who premiered major works by César Franck, Vincent d'Indy and others. She married a brother of the composer Charles Bordes, and was known by the surname Bordes-Pène thereafter. In 1889-91, the painter Jacques Émile Blanche painted her portrait.

== Biography ==
Marie-Léontine Pène was born in Lorient on 25 November 1858. She studied at the Conservatoire de Paris, gaining first prize in playing the piano in 1872. Her teachers included Félix Le Couppey. On 16 December 1886, in Brussels, Bordes-Pène was the co-performer, along with the dedicatee Eugène Ysaÿe, in the premiere public performance of César Franck's Violin Sonata in A major, which began early evening, being the finale to a long program that started at 3 pm. However, the gallery in which the performance took place permitted no artificial lighting for fear of damaging the paintings. Hence, the artists played most of the sonata in the dark and from memory. Also in 1886, in Paris, she was the soloist at the first performance of Vincent d'Indy's Symphony on a French Mountain Air, which was dedicated to her.

In 1888, Pierre de Bréville dedicated his Fantasie to her. Franck also dedicated his Prelude, aria et finale to her, which she premiered on 12 May 1888. She championed other new French piano music, by composers such as Emmanuel Chabrier, Gabriel Fauré, Henri Duparc, Ernest Chausson, her brother-in-law Charles Bordes and others. In 1890, a stroke left her paralysed, and she retired to teach in Rouen where she died on 24 January 1924, aged 65.
