= Francisca Sarasate =

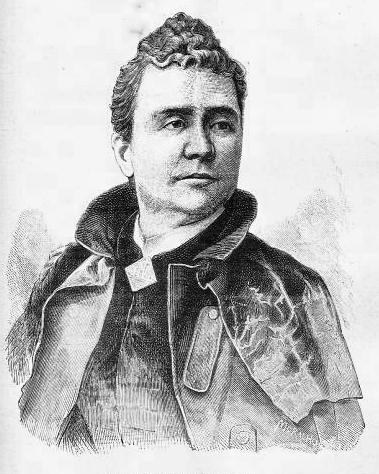
Francisca Sarasate de Mena (1893)

Francisca Sarasate Navascués (A Coruña, 29 November 1853 – Pamplona, 1 May 1922) was a Spanish writer. She signed some of her books with her married surname, Francisca Sarasate de Mena. Her works included fiction, non-fiction, and poetry, with some of the latter being set to music by others. Sarasate served as director of La Gaceta de París.

== Biography ==
Her parents were Miguel Sarasate Juanena, a military musician, and Francisca Javiera Navascués Oarriechena. Francisca's brother was the violinist Pablo de Sarasate. She was born in A Coruña while her father was stationed there, but Francisca considered herself Navarrese like the rest of her family.

She married the Carlist professor and writer Juan Cancio Mena, and was widowed in April 1916.

Her first novel was a contribution in La Ilustración Española y Americana in 1879. Her writings earned her some admiration among musicians such as Camille Saint-Saëns, who in 1880 composed in Sarasate's honor the Aragonese jota "A mademoiselle Paquita de Sarasate". Some of Sarasate's poems were set to music by her brother. She gave several lectures at the Ateneo de Zaragoza and was director of La Gaceta de París.

== Awards ==
In 1882, Sarasate won the 5th prize -consisting of a golden pen- in the contest organized by the City Council of Alba de Tormes on the occasion of the 3rd Centenary of the death of Teresa de Ávila, for “Amor divino”.

== Selected works ==
=== Fiction ===
- Un libro para las pollas. Novela de costumbres contemporáneas relacionadas con la educación de la mujer. Obra útil a las madres y a las hijas (novel, 1976)
- Fulvia, o los primeros cristianos (short novel, 1889)
- Cuentos vascongados (short stories, 1896)

=== Non-fiction ===
- Noticias biográficas del primer período de la vida artística de don Pablo Sarasate (biography, 1878; republished, 1921)
- Recuerdos de Sarasate (memoir, 1921)

=== Poetry ===
- Horizontes poéticos (1881)
- Amor divino (1883)
- Una velada poética en el Ateneo de Zaragoza (1890)
- Romancero aragonés (1894)
- Poesías religiosas (1900)
- Pensamienos místicos (1910)

== Bibliography ==
- Mata Induráin, Carlos (1999). "Panorama del cuento literario navarro en el siglo XX". Príncipe de Viana (in Spanish). 60 (216): 235–265. ISSN 0032-8472. Archived from the original on 31 December 2019 – via archive.org.
