= Zino Francescatti =

French violinist (1902–1991)

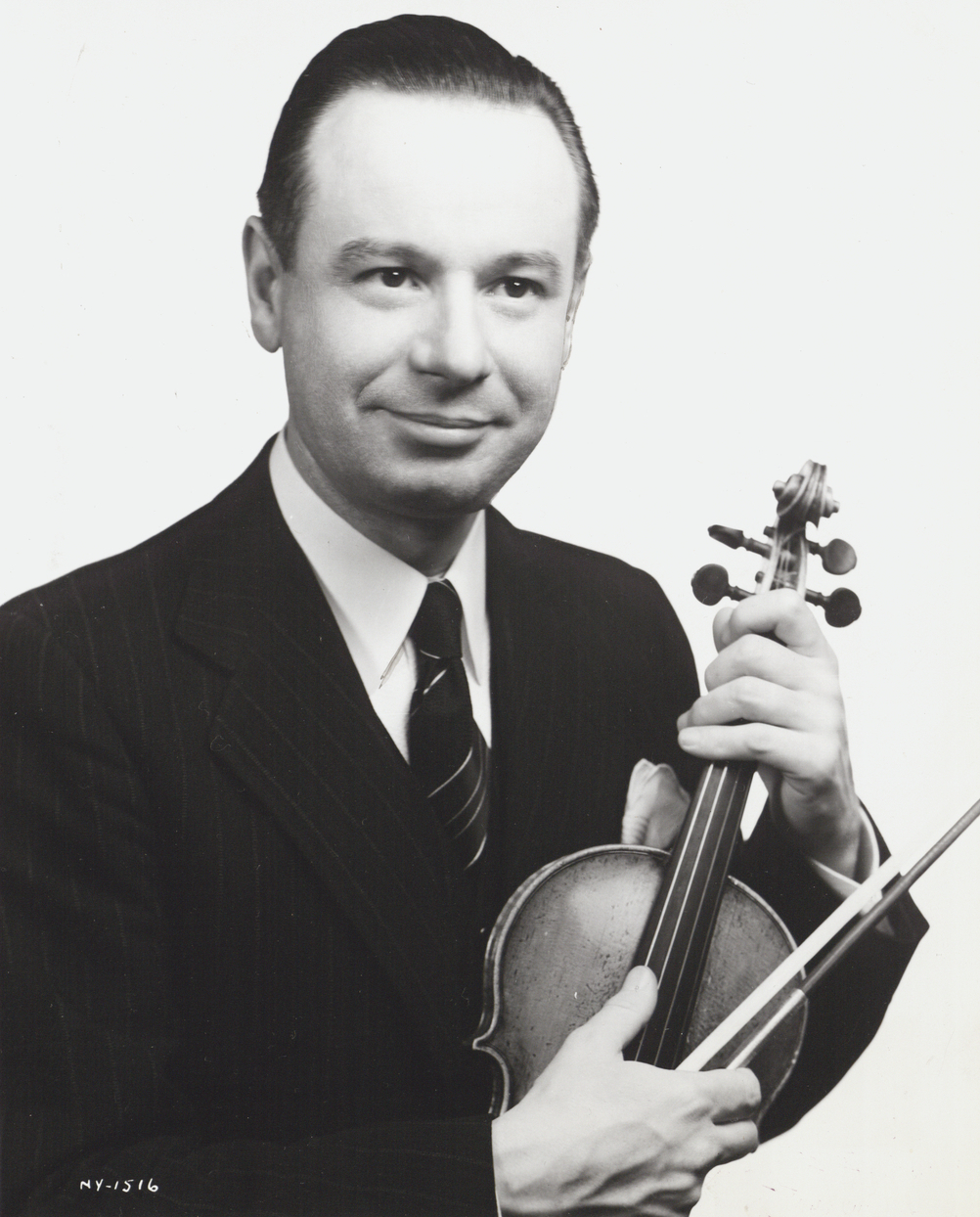
- Francescatti, in the 1940s
- Born: René-Charles Francescatti; 9 August 1902; Marseille, France
- Died: 17 September 1991 (aged 89); La Ciotat, Bouches-du-Rhône, France
- Occupations: Violinist; Pedagogue
- Organizations: École Normale de Musique

René-Charles "Zino" Francescatti (9 August 1902 – 17 September 1991) was a French virtuoso violinist, renowned for his lyrical playing style.

== Career ==
René-Charles "Zino" Francescatti was born in Marseille, to a musical family. Both parents were violinists. His father, who also played the cello, had studied with Camillo Sivori. Zino studied violin from age three and was quickly recognized as a child prodigy. He began performing at the age of five and made his debut at age 10, playing Beethoven's Violin Concerto.

In 1925, he made his Paris debut with Paganini's Violin Concerto No. 1, and in 1927 he joined the faculty of the École Normale de Musique; he also conducted the Concerts Poulets. He made his first world tour in 1931 and his American debut with Sir John Barbirolli and the New York Philharmonic in 1939, again playing Paganini's Violin Concerto. For three decades after 1945 he had an exceptionally impressive international career, living in the United States and France.

Francescatti played all of the great concerti. His notable performances include Mendelssohn's Violin Concerto in E minor, Saint-Saëns' Violin Concerto No. 3, Max Bruch's Violin Concerto No. 1, and others.

Francescatti made several LPs, including a set of the complete Beethoven violin-piano sonatas with Robert Casadesus, a frequent musical collaborator of his. Both in concerts and on disc, he performed on the celebrated "Hart" Stradivarius of 1727. Francescatti was active as an editor of classical repertoire for the International Music Company, which continues to publish his work. Upon his retirement in 1976, he sold the instrument and established the Zino Francescatti Foundation to assist young violinists in La Ciotat. In 1987, an international violin competition was organized in his honor in Aix-en-Provence.

He died in La Ciotat, aged 89.

== Recordings ==
- Saint-Saëns: Concerto No. 3, New York Philharmonic Orchestra, conducted by Pierre Boulez (Live concert 16/12/ 1975). CD Lyrinx LYR 086
- Saint-Saëns: Concerto No. 3, Philharmonic Symphony Orchestra of New York, conducted by Dimitri Mitropoulos. LP Columbia 1950 report CD Sony 1996
- Saint-Saëns: Introduction et Rondo Capricioso, Havanaise, Ernest Chausson: Poème, Philadelphia Orchestra, conducted by Eugene Ormandy. LP Columbia 1950
- Beethoven, Sonata in E-flat major, Op. 12 and Sonata in A minor, Op. 23, with Robert Casadesus, piano, Philips A01611R, 1961.
