= Berthe Marx =

French pianist

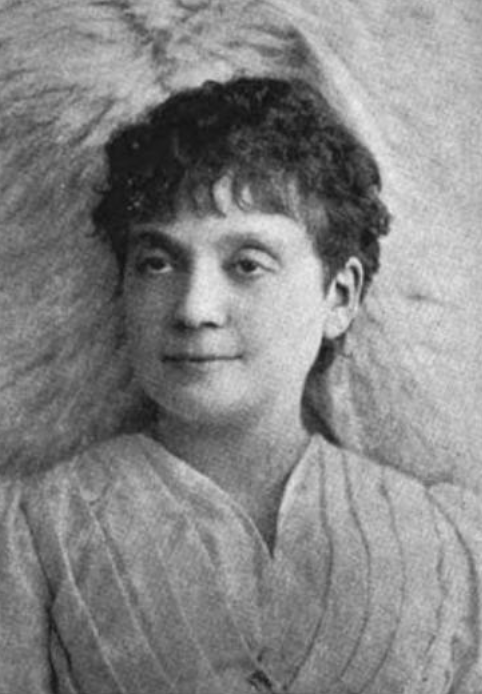
- Born: 28 July 1859; Paris, France
- Died: 1925 (aged 65–66)
- Other name: Berthe Marx-Goldschmidt
- Occupation: Pianist

Berthe Marx (Berthe Marx-Goldschmidt; 28 July 1859 – 1925) was a French pianist. She played about 250 works by heart during a series of concerts in Berlin and Paris in 1894.

== Early years and education ==
Berthe Marx, born at Paris, July 28, 1859. Her father may have been Charles Lamoureux. She began to study the pianoforte at the age of four, receiving her first instruction from her father, who for 40 years was a violoncello-player in the Conservatoire de Paris and Grand Opera orchestras. In 1868, she was accepted by Auber as a student at the Conservatoire without any preliminary examination. At this institution, she gained the first prize for piano playing under Henri Herz’s guidance, and afterwards studied with Stephen Heller.

== Career ==
Upon completing her studies, Marx undertook a series of concert tours through France and Belgium, everywhere meeting with a cordial reception. At Brussels, she met Pablo de Sarasate, who, recognizing her great talent, engaged her as soloist and accompanist, in which capacities she accompanied him on his tours through Europe, Mexico, and the US; she played in all in about 600 concerts. She composed several "Rhapsodies Espagnoles," and arranged Sarasate's Spanish Dances for the piano. Around 1894, she married Otto Goldschmidt, Sarasate's friend, accompanist, and manager.

Marx accomplished some large memorizing feats in the course of her career. Perhaps the greatest occurred in 1894, when she played about 250 works by heart, during a series of concerts in Berlin and Paris. She died in 1925.

== Bibliography ==
- Ehrlich, A. Celebrated Pianists of the Past and Present Time. Philadelphia: T. Presser, 1894.
- Musical News (1903). Musical News (Public domain ed.).
- Singer, Isidore; Adler, Cyrus (1912). The Jewish Encyclopedia: A Descriptive Record of the History, Religion, Literature, and Customs of the Jewish People from the Earliest Times to the Present Day. Funk and Wagnalls.
