= Hungarian Rhapsody No. 13 =

Composition by Franz Liszt

Hungarian Rhapsody No. 13, S.244/13, in A minor, is the thirteenth Hungarian Rhapsody by Franz Liszt. One of the lesser performed works of Liszt, the friska section starts with a theme used by the well-known Allegro molto vivace from Zigeunerweisen by Pablo de Sarasate (Ketten mentünk, hárman jöttünk). At the end, it quotes the authentic Hungarian folk song Nem, nem, nem, nem megyünk mi innen el (No, no, no, no, we're not going out of here).

A typical performance of the work lasts from eight to ten minutes.

== Sources of the melodies ==
In addition to the two folk songs mentioned above, this rhapsody quotes Akkor szép az erdő, mikor zöld. This rhapsody is based on the 17th number of Magyar Dalok, Volume I.
