= Carmen Fantasie (Waxman) =

1946 virtuoso showpiece by Franz Waxman

Carmen Fantasie is a virtuoso showpiece for violin and orchestra. The piece is part of Franz Waxman's score to the 1946 movie Humoresque for which he received an Academy Award nomination for Best Music, Scoring of a Dramatic or Comedy Picture. The music, based on various themes from Georges Bizet's opera Carmen and unrelated to the similarly titled work Carmen Fantasy by Pablo de Sarasate, was initially meant to be played by Jascha Heifetz. However, he was replaced by a young Isaac Stern for the film's recording of the score. Stern's hands can be seen in the close-up shots from the movie.

After seeing the film, Heifetz asked Waxman to expand the work because he wanted to play it on the radio program, The Bell Telephone Hour, where it premiered on 9 September 1946. The work has been played since by many virtuoso violinists in concerts. It has also been adapted for a variety of orchestral/chamber arrangements, such as a versions for trumpet and orchestra, for violin and piano, as well as for viola and piano/orchestra.

The score and parts are published by Fidelio Music and is available on IMSLP. It and the rest of Waxman's catalog was acquired by G. Schirmer from the composer's son in 2022.
