= Christian Ferras =

French violinist (1933–1982)

Christian Ferras (17 June 1933 – 14 September 1982) was a French violinist.

== Early life and education ==
Ferras was born at Le Touquet in 1933. He began studying the violin with his father. He entered the Conservatoire de Nice as a student of Charles Bistesi in 1941, and in 1943 obtained the First Prize. In 1944 he went to the Conservatoire de Paris.

== Career ==
In 1946 he won the First Prize in both disciplines (violin and chamber music), and started his performing career with the Pasdeloup Orchestra under Albert Wolff, and later Paul Paray. He worked with Romanian violinist and composer George Enescu, who also acted as an instructor.

The Violin Concerto by Federico Elizalde was premiered by Ginette Neveu in Paris in 1944, but Christian Ferras gave its London premiere under the direction of Gaston Poulet, in the presence of the composer, and made the world premiere recording on 7 November 1947, at the age of 14. In 1948 Ferras won First Prize at the international Scheveningen Festival; Yehudi Menuhin was among the judges. He premiered Arthur Honegger's Sonata for Solo Violin in the Salle Gaveau on 16 November 1948. The next year, he won the second prize (the first prize was not awarded) in the international Marguerite Long-Jacques Thibaud Competition. It was there that he met Pierre Barbizet, with whom he formed one of the most famous partnerships in the history of piano-violin collaboration. In 1950 he, along with Jean-Pierre Rampal and George Enescu, recorded various works by J.S. Bach. It was at this point that his career took off when he was invited by Karl Böhm to play with the Berlin Philharmonic in 1951. He subsequently gave a series of concerts in, amongst other places, Japan and South America.

=== Later years ===
In 1952, he premiered both Claude Pascal's violin sonata, and (with Pierre Barbizet), he premiered Double Concerto by Ivan Semenoff. In 1954, he recorded Brahms's Violin Concerto with Carl Schuricht. 1959 was a year in which Ferras rose to real prominence: he began his career in the United States by playing Brahms's concerto under Charles Munch; recorded Bach's Double Concerto with Yehudi Menuhin; played at the Prades Festival with Pablo Casals and Wilhelm Kempff; and premiered Gyula Bando's Violin Concerto.

In 1960 he premiered Serge Nigg's Concerto, which the composer is said to have written "for the violin and not without the violin". In 1965 he enjoyed a much acclaimed tour through Southern Africa with accompanist Jean-Clause Ambrosini.

Ferras made many recordings with EMI, including

- Beethoven's sonatas for violin and piano with Pierre Barbizet (1958)
- Berg's Chamber Concerto and his Violin Concerto 'To the Memory of an Angel'.

He went on in 1964 to record the Brahms Concerto with Herbert von Karajan for the Deutsche Grammophon label, and then the concertos of Sibelius, Tchaikovsky, Beethoven and Bach, which are the recordings for which he is most admired. He continued to make recordings with Deutsche Grammophon: with Barbizet, the violin sonatas of Brahms, Schumann, Franck and Lekeu.

== Accolades ==
Ferras's 1965 Deutsche Grammophon recording of the Sibelius Violin Concerto with Herbert von Karajan and the Berlin Philharmonic won both the Grand Prix du Disque and Edison Prize. In 1975, he was awarded recognition by the Conservatoire de Paris for his works, and retired from regular public performance for health reasons. He returned to playing in Paris on 9 March 1982 with Alain Lefèvre and then on 6 May with Pierre Barbizet. He gave his last concert in Vichy on 25 August 1982.

== Personal life ==
Ferras struggled with severe lifelong depression.

=== Death ===
He died by suicide in Paris on 14 September 1982, aged 49.
