= Spanish Dances =

Collection of eighy pieces for violin and piano

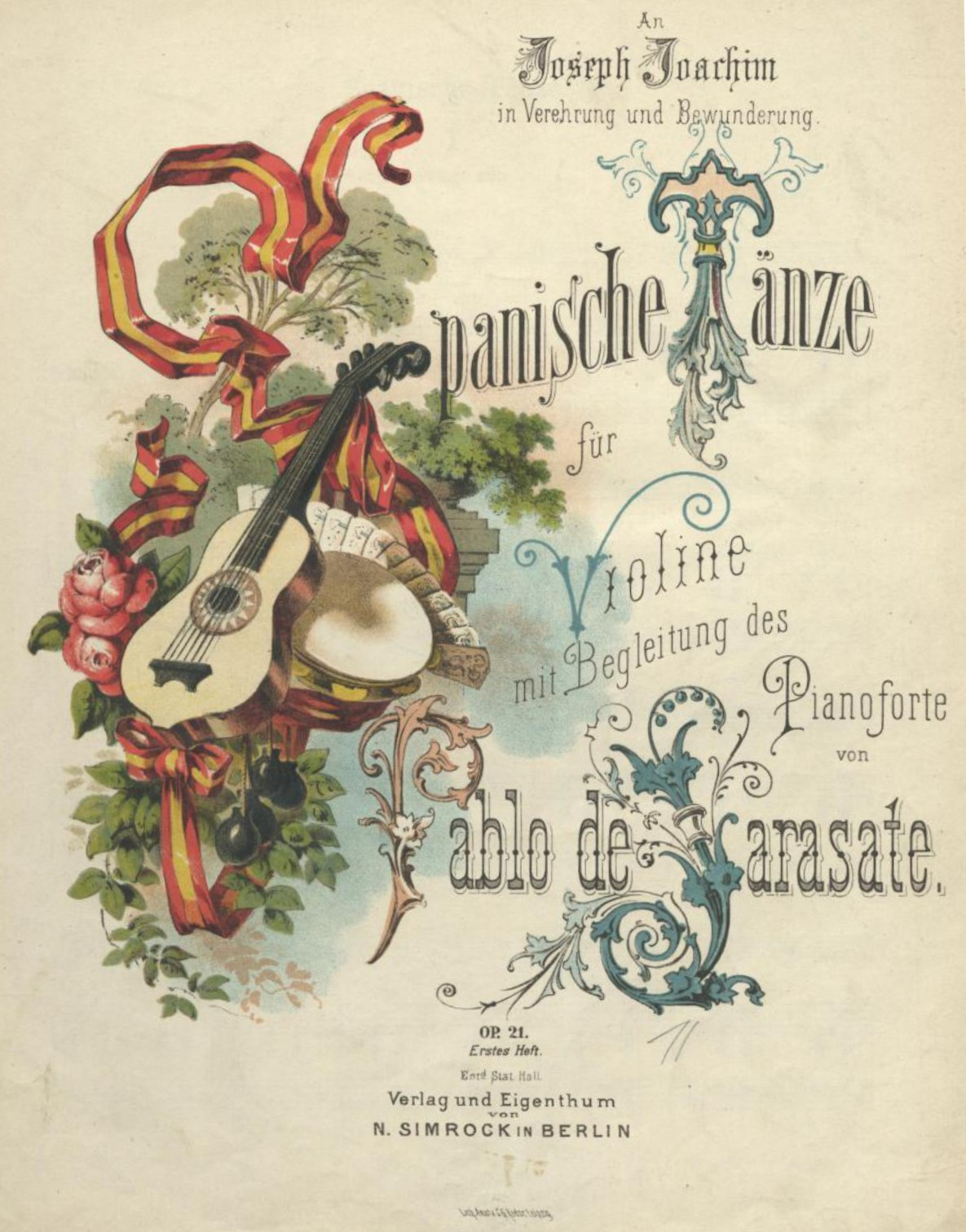
Cover of the first edition of Book I

The Spanish Dances (Spanish: Danzas españolas, first published title: German: Spanische Tänze) are a collection of eight pieces for violin and piano composed by Pablo de Sarasate between 1877 and 1882 and published in four books, each book combining two dances contrasting in rhythm and character. They are among Sarasate's best known works.

== History ==
The Spanish Dances were commissioned by German publisher Fritz Simrock in 1877, who had recognized the potential of European folk dances, starting a few years earlier with the Hungarian Dances by Johannes Brahms. Sarasate composed eight pieces, published by Simrock between 1878 and 1882 in four books of two pieces each. The Spanish Dances proved to be a great commercial success, and another ten pieces were listed in Simrock's catalogue as books V to XIV, though none of them (including El canto del ruiseñor, Op. 29, and Airs Écossais, Op. 34) ended up being published as Spanish Dances.

Book I (Malagueña and Habanera), Op. 21, was composed in Germany between December 1877 and February 1878, and dedicated to Joseph Joachim, whom he had met in Berlin.

Book II (Romanza andaluza and Jota navarra), Op. 22, was composed during his first tour of Scandinavia in 1878, and dedicated to Moravian violinist Wilma Neruda.

Book III (Playera and Zapateado), Op. 23, was composed in summer 1879 and dedicated to Hugo Heermann, a German violinist Sarasate had met in Frankfurt that year.

Book IV, Op. 26, was completed in October 1881 in Paris, and is the only book where the dances do not have titles. Instead, they are usually named after the dances they were inspired by (Vito and Habanera). Book IV was dedicated to Leopold Auer, whom Sarasate had met in Saint Petersburg at the end of 1881.

== Structure ==
External audio
- Performed by Itzhak Perlman and Samuel Sanders
- 1. Malagueña
- 2. Habanera
- 3. Romanza andaluza
- 4. Jota navarra
- 5. Playera
- 6. Zapateado
- 8. Habanera

The dances make use of folk tunes in elegant arrangements.

1. Malagueña (Andantino)
  D major, 3/8; an Andalusian song with ornamented melodies and augmented seconds.
2. Habanera (Allegretto)
  D minor, 2/4; a Cuban dance.
3. Romanza andaluza (Andantino)
  C major, 6/8; a moving, lyrical romance.
4. Jota navarra (Allegro)
  A major, 3/8; a lively, brilliant dance.
5. Playera (Lento)
  D minor, 3/4; a popular Andalusian folk song with a lamenting tone.
6. Zapateado (Allegro)
  A major, 6/8; a virtuosic, expressive-lyrical dance.
7. Vito (Allegretto)
  A minor, 3/8; a popular Andalusian song which Sarasate had already used in the Airs espagnols, Op. 18. The middle section is based on the popular Spanish song La partida by Fermín María Álvarez.
8. Habanera (Allegro moderato)
  C major, 2/4; a habanera with great rhythmic and harmonic variety.

== Reception ==
The Spanish Dances were immensely successful for Sarasate, who frequently performed them as encores. They were also a commercial success, leading to a large number of editions and reprints, and arrangements for other instruments, including a piano arrangement by Berthe Marx.

Leopold Auer, the dedicatee of Book IV, described the Spanish works of Sarasate as "original, inventive and effective concert pieces, so warmly coloured with the fire and romance of his native land".
