= Cello Sonata (Franck/Delsart) =

Arrangement of a violin sonata for cello by Delsart

The setting for cello of César Franck's Violin Sonata in A major was the only alternative version sanctioned by Franck. It was created by the cellist Jules Delsart.

== History ==
The A major Violin Sonata is one of César Franck's best-known compositions, and is considered one of the finest sonatas for violin and piano ever written. After thorough historical study based on reliable documents, the Jules Delsart arrangement for cello (the piano part remains the same as in the violin sonata) was published by G. Henle Verlag as an Urtext edition.

In his biography of Franck, Joël-Marie Fauquet reports on how there came to be a cello version. After a performance of the violin sonata in Paris on 27 December 1887, the cellist Jules Delsart, who was actively participating in this concert as a quartet player, was so enthusiastic that he begged Franck for permission to arrange the violin part for cello. In a letter that Franck wrote his cousin presumably only a little later, he mentioned: "Mr Delsart is now working on a cello arrangement of the sonata."

According to this, the arrangement for cello did not proceed from the publishing house, but from a musician who was a friend of the composer’s (both taught at the Paris Conservatoire). There is also no doubt about Franck’s consenting to this arrangement. Since the piano part remained unchanged, the renowned publishing house Hamelle did not publish the arrangement in an edition all its own (c. 1888), but simply enclosed the cello part with its separate plate number in the score.

During Franck's lifetime the A major sonata was offered in two (more or less) equal variant settings (piano and violin; piano and cello), with the explicit reference to the arranger (Jules Delsart) of the cello version. César Franck probably had nothing against the title page in that he gave away appropriate copies to friends and acquaintances, including a dedication to the musicologist Adolf Sandberger.

Comparing the two solo parts (violin vs. cello) demonstrates that Delsart kept very closely to the original and generally limited himself to transposing the violin part to the lower register. In only a few passages are there exceptions where Delsart adapted the music to the technical playing conditions of the cello.

Delsart's arrangement of Franck's sonata for piano and cello has been one of the beloved sonatas in the instrument's repertoire. With the publication of the Urtext edition by G. Henle Verlag in 2013, the integrity of the cello version is justified. (At the heart of G. Henle Verlag's programme are the so-called Urtext Editions. They are characterized by their correct musical text, drawn up following strict scholarly principles, with an extensive commentary on the sources consulted – covering autographs, copies and early printings – and details regarding the readings.)

On the "oral and written history" that Cesar Franck first conceived the sonata for cello and piano (before the commission from Eugène Ysaÿe arrived), Pablo Casals wrote in 1968, "... what I remember distinctly is that Ysaÿe told me that Franck had told him that the Sonata was intended for violin or cello. That was the reason for my taking it up and playing it so much during my tours."

Antoine Ysaÿe, Eugène Ysaÿe's son, expressed in a letter that there is a version in César Franck's handwriting for cello.
