= Ulf Hoelscher =

German violinist

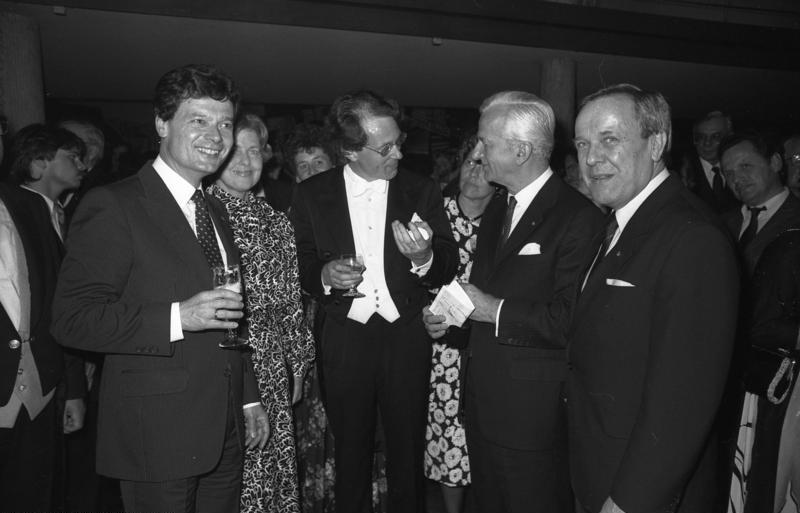
Ulf Hoelscher (middle), 1987

Ulf Hoelscher (born 17 January 1942 in Kitzingen) is a German violinist.

He has been soloist with the Berlin Philharmonic, the Vienna Symphony, the BBC Symphony Orchestra and the New York Philharmonic. He has recorded numerous concertos by Schoeck, Beethoven, Berg, Bruch, Schumann, Spohr, Saint-Saëns, and Tchaikovsky.

He teaches violin at the Musikhochschule Karlsruhe and the Accademia di Cervo in Italy.

He plays an 18th-century Guarneri violin.

== Selected recordings ==
- Camille Saint-Saëns, Complete Violin Concertos (n°1, n°2, n°3), Ulf Hoelscher, violin, New Philharmonia Orchestra, conductor Pierre Dervaux. Recorded 1977 for EMI, reissued by Brillant Classics 2012
