= Charles Bordes =

French music teacher and composer

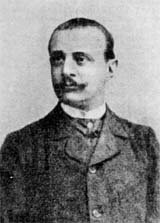
Charles Bordes

Anne-Marie Charles Bordes-Bonjean (12 May 1863 – 8 November 1909) was a French music teacher and composer.

== Timeline ==
Bordes was born in La Roche-Corbon, Indre-et-Loire. He studied pianoforte with Antoine François Marmontel and composition with César Franck. He was organist and Maître de chapelle at Nogent-sur-Marne from 1887 to 1890. In 1890 he became maître de chapelle at the Église Saint-Gervais in Paris, where he created the Saint-Gervais Singers Choir, and in 1892 organised The Saint-Gervais Holy Weeks in which Mass was accompanied by French or Italian renaissance music.

In 1897 Bordes published Archives de la tradition basque, an ethnomusicological study commissioned by the French minister of public education.

== Schola Cantorum ==
On 15 October 1896 the Schola Cantorum of Paris was inaugurated. Bordes founded the Schola Cantorum, a society for sacred music, with Vincent d'Indy and Alexandre Guilmant. The Schola Cantorum was responsible for reviving interest in plain-song and the music of Palestrina, Josquin des Prez Victoria and others.

Bordes went on to found a Schola Cantorum in Avignon in 1899, and another in Montpellier in 1905. He remained actively involved with the original Schola Cantorum until his early death at Toulon.

== Other ==
Bordes' brother married the pianist Marie-Léontine Pène, who was known as Bordes-Pène thereafter.
