= Albert Tipton =

American flutist, pianist and conductor

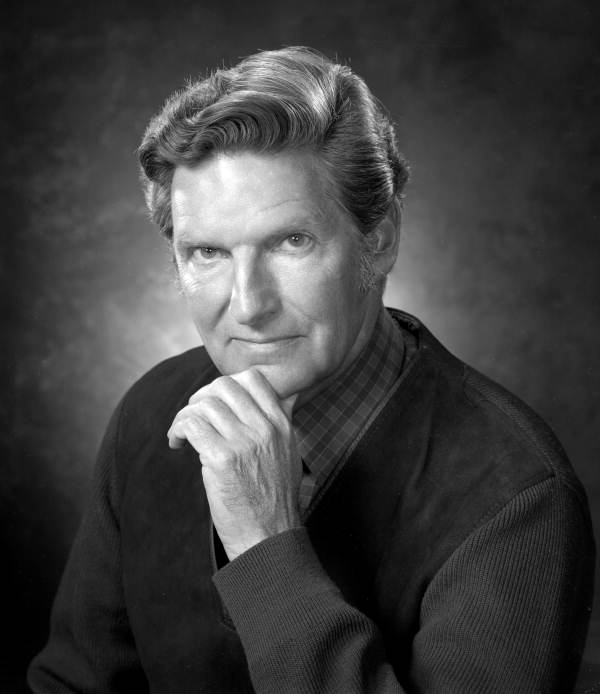
Albert Tipton at FSU

Albert Tipton (March 16, 1917 – October 5, 1997) was an American flutist, pianist and conductor. In 1966, Time placed Albert Tipton amongst the "30 first-rate flutists" in the United States and Europe. He studied with William Kincaid at the Curtis Institute of Music in Philadelphia. He served as principal flutist with the National Symphony Orchestra from 1937 to 1939 and toured with Leopold Stokowski as a soloist with the All American Youth Orchestra in 1939. He became second flutist with the Philadelphia Orchestra in 1940 and left that position in 1946 to become the principal flutist of the St. Louis Symphony Orchestra (1946–1956). He was in Detroit from 1956 to 1968, where he played principal flute in the Detroit Symphony Orchestra. In 1968 he accepted a position at Florida State University as Professor of Flute. He later moved to Rice University in Houston, Texas serving as Professor of Flute from 1975 to 1990.

In addition to orchestral playing, Albert Tipton played in and led the Tipton Chamber Orchestra and the Tipton Trio. He concertized regularly with his wife, pianist Mary Norris.
