= Edouard van Remoortel =

Belgian conductor

Edouard van Remoortel (30 May 1926 in Brussels – 16 May 1977 in Paris) was a Belgian conductor. He studied cello and conducting at the Brussels conservatory. He was affiliated with the Belgian National Orchestra as of 1951.

From 1958 to 1962, van Remoortel was music director of the Saint Louis Symphony Orchestra (SLSO). He was appointed after a successful guest-conducting appearance with the SLSO. However, troubles soon developed between him and the orchestra, because of his relative youth and conducting inexperience, and also because of personality clashes with the musicians. In his first season, he attempted to dismiss 42 of the orchestra's musicians, and in return, they voted at one point not to play for him. His last season with the SLSO featured him as conductor in only seven subscription concerts, and his contract was not renewed. While in St. Louis, van Remoortel did make a guest conducting appearance with the St. Louis Philharmonic, a non-professional community orchestra separate from the SLSO.

van Remoortel also served as the direct of the Monte Carlo Philharmonic.

== Recordings ==
- Henry Charles Litolff: Concerto Symphonique No. 4, Op 102, Gerald Robbins (piano), Monte-Carlo Opera Orchestra
- Camille Saint-Saëns: violin concerto n°3, Havanaise op.83, Introduction et Rondo capriccioso op.28, Maurice Ravel, Tzigane, Henryk Szeryng (violin), Monte-Carlo Opera Orchestra, conductor Edouard Van Remoortel. Recorded 10/1969. CD Philips 1988
- Camille Saint-Saëns, violin concerto n°2, Ivry Gitlis, violon, (with concerto n°4, op.62, unfinished), Monte-Carlo Opera Orchestra, conductor Edouard Van Remoortel. Recorded 1968. LP Philipps report CD 1998
- Félix Mendelssohn: Symphony No.4 in A Major, op.90. Pro Musica Symphony, Vienna. (Vox s-705)
- Edvard Grieg: Symphonic Dances op.64 Pro Musica Symphony, Vienna. (Vox s-706)

Many recordings were made for the Vox label with various European orchestras.
