= Introduction and Rondo Capriccioso =

Composition for violin and orchestra by Camille Saint-Saëns

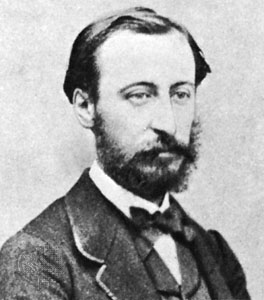
Saint-Saëns in 1875

The Introduction and Rondo Capriccioso in A minor (French: Introduction et Rondo capriccioso), Op. 28, is a composition for violin and orchestra written in 1863 by Camille Saint-Saëns. It was dedicated to the virtuoso violinist Pablo de Sarasate, who performed the solo violin part at the premiere in April 1867.

Introduction et Rondo Capriccioso, Op. 28
Performed by Elias Goldstein with the DePaul Symphony

== History ==
The Introduction and Rondo Capriccioso was originally intended to be the rousing finale to Saint-Saëns' first violin concerto, Op. 20, though its success as a solo composition at its first performance led Saint-Saëns to publish it separately.

The premiere took place on 4 April 1867 at the Champs-Élysées, with Pablo de Sarasate playing the solo part and the composer conducting.

Several arrangements of the score have been made, including for violin and piano by Georges Bizet, piano duet by Jacques Durand, two pianos by Claude Debussy and trumpet by Mikhail Nakariakov.

== Instrumentation ==
The work is scored for solo violin, 2 flutes/piccolo, 2 oboes, 2 clarinets, 2 bassoons, 2 horns, 2 trumpets (or cornets), 3 timpani and strings.

== Style and structure ==
The piece opens with a 36-bar theme in A minor, (although the initial tempo should be Andante malinconico) establishing key as well as rhythmic and harmonic themes. The orchestra supports the violin with block chord progressions while the soloist plays virtuosic arpeggios and chromatic scalar passages. Saint-Saëns destabilizes the rhythm of the soloist oscillating between syncopated rising arpeggios and falling eighth notes. In bar 18 the motion picks up when the tempo indication changes from Andante malinconico to animato and the soloist jumps into a rapid thirty-second note line.

== In popular culture ==
The 1939 film They Shall Have Music features a performance of the piece by the violin virtuoso Jascha Heifetz.

The work also features prominently in the light novel, manga and anime Your Lie in April. It is played in its violin and piano arrangement by the show's two primary protagonists as part of a musical competition.
