= Pierre Dervaux =

French conductor, composer and pedagogue (1917–1992)

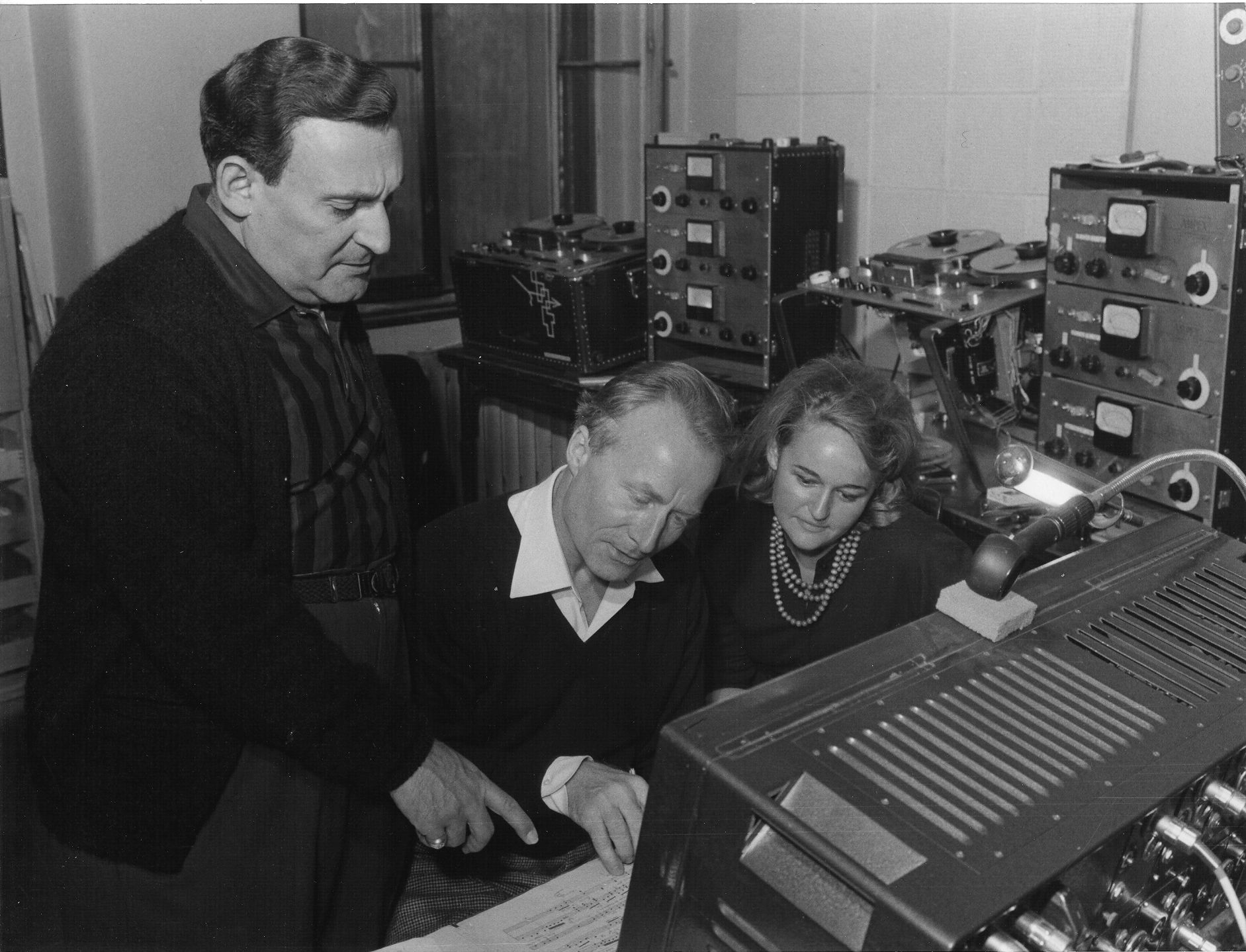
Dervaux (centre) beside Sarah and Richard Tucker at the Musikverein in Vienna

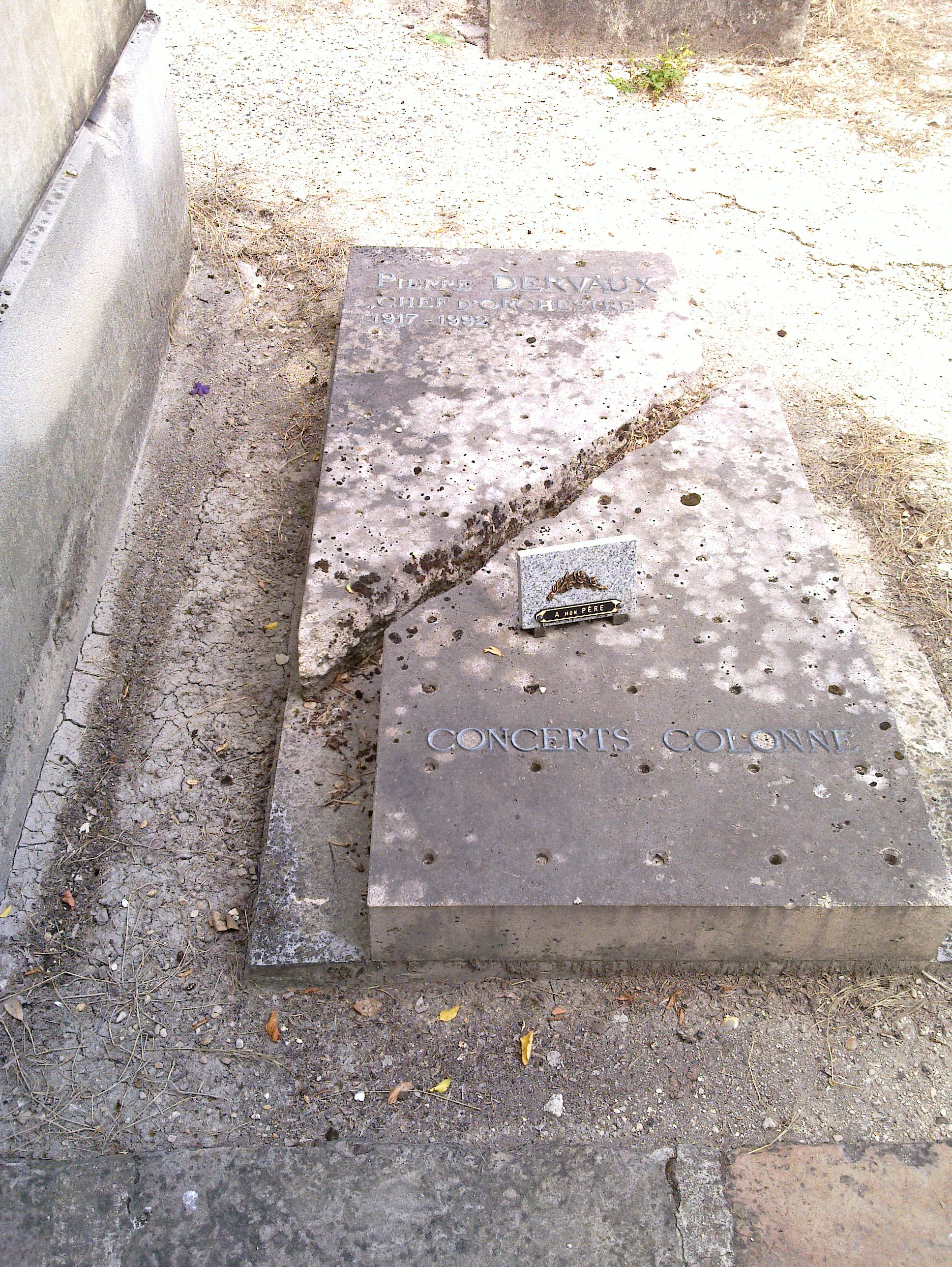
Dervaux's grave

Pierre Jean-Émile Dervaux (3 January 1917 – 20 February 1992) was a French conductor, composer, and pedagogue.

== Biography ==
Dervaux was born on 3 January 1917 in Juvisy-sur-Orge, Île-de-France. At Conservatoire de Paris, he studied counterpoint and harmony with Marcel Samuel-Rousseau and Jean and Noël Gallon, as well as piano with Isidor Philipp, Armand Ferté, and Yves Nat. He also served as principal conductor of the Opéra-Comique (1947–1953), and the Opéra de Paris (1956–1972). In this capacity he directed the French première of Poulenc's Dialogues des Carmélites. He was also Vice-President of the Concerts Pasdeloup (1949–1955), President and Chief conductor of the Concerts Colonne (1958–1992), Musical Director of the Orchestre des Pays de Loire (1971–1979) as well as holding similar posts at the Quebec Symphony Orchestra (1968–1975), where he collaborated with concertmaster Hidetaro Suzuki, and the Nice Philharmonic (1979–1982).

He taught at the École Normale de Musique de Paris (1964–1986), the Conservatoire de musique du Québec à Montréal (1965–1972) and was also president of the jury of the international conducting competition in Besançon.

Dervaux composed two symphonies, two concertos, a string quartet, a trio and several songs.

In addition to the Légion d'honneur, Dervaux also received the Ordre national du Mérite.

His recordings include: L'Enfance du Christ (Berlioz) in 1959, Les pêcheurs de perles (Bizet) in 1961, and Istar, Wallenstein and La Forêt enchantée (d'Indy) in 1975.

Dervaux died in Marseille on 20 February 1992, aged 75. He is buried at the Père Lachaise Cemetery in Paris.

== Selected recordings ==
Camille Saint-Saëns, Complete Violin Concertos (n°1, n°2, n°3), Ulf Hoelscher, violin, New Philarmonie Orchestra, conductor Pierre Dervaux. Recorded 1977. 2 CD Brillant Classics 2012
