= Zigeunerweisen =

1878 musical work by Pablo de Sarasate

- by Pablo de Sarasate
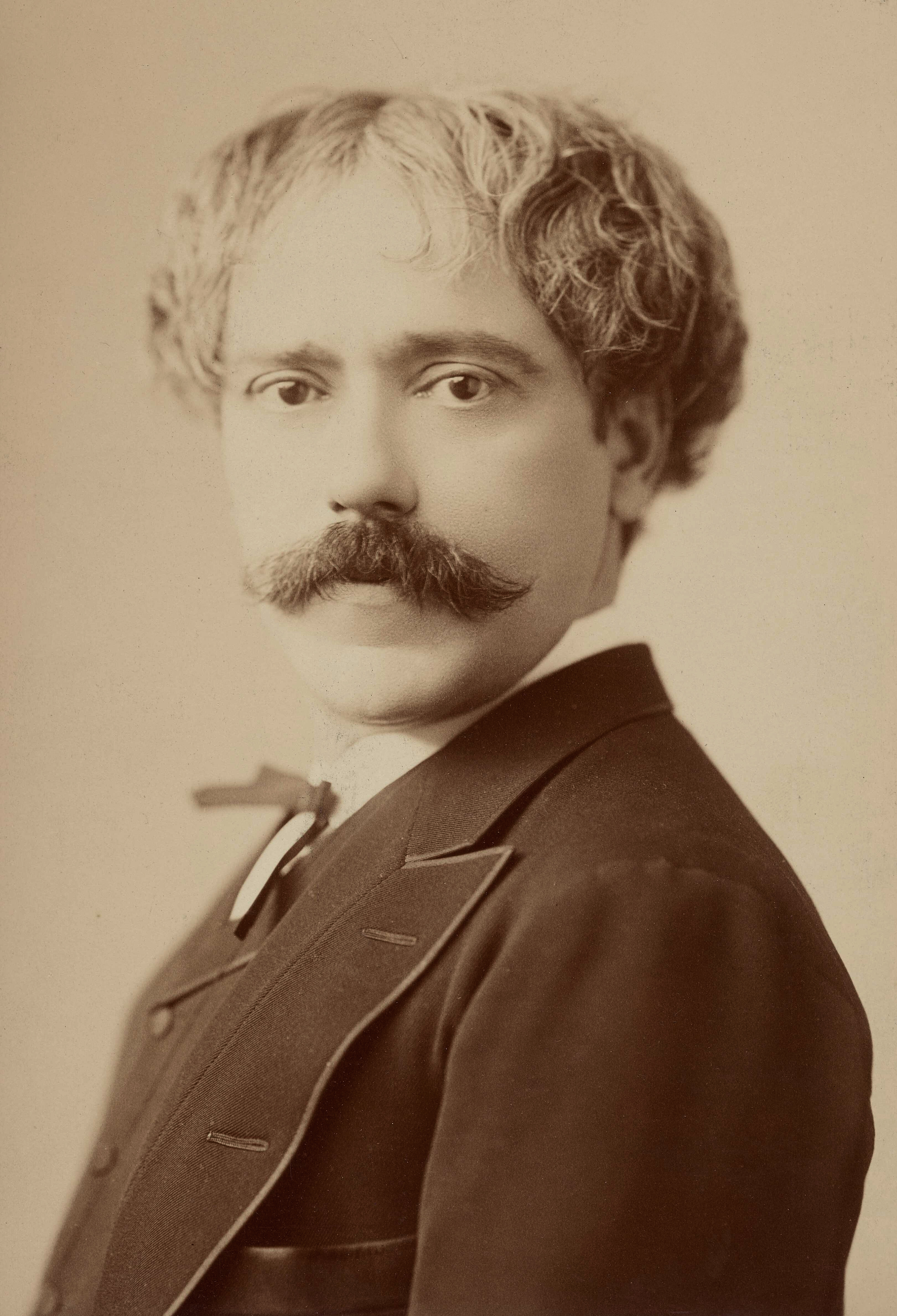
- Pablo de Sarasate, c. 1890
- Language: Spanish
- Scoring: Orchestra, violin

Premiere
- Date: 1878

Zigeunerweisen (Gypsy Airs, Spanish: Aires gitanos), Op. 20, is a musical composition for violin and orchestra written in 1878 by the Spanish composer Pablo de Sarasate. It was premiered the same year in Leipzig, Germany. Like his contemporaries, Sarasate misidentified Hungarian folk music with the "gypsy music" of the Romani people, and the themes in the piece are not of Romani origin, but were all actually adapted from Hungarian music pieces: for instance, the third section borrows a melody by Hungarian composer Elemér Szentirmay (1836–1908), and the last section uses a theme from Franz Liszt's Hungarian Rhapsody No. 13, in the rhythm of the csárdás.

As one of Sarasate's most popular compositions and a favorite among violin virtuosos, the work has remained a staple on records at least since Sarasate himself recorded it in 1904, in collaboration with fellow composer Juan Manén as the accompanying pianist in the aforementioned recording, although the 3rd movement was omitted due to time constraints of records. Sarasate's voice is briefly heard in the middle of the record. Before the 4th movement, the following sentence can be heard: "Baja el pedal de la sordina." ("Lower the damper pedal.") It has been recorded by a large number of violinists.

== Instrumentation ==
Zigeunerweisen is scored for solo violin and an orchestra consisting of two flutes, two oboes, two clarinets in B♭, two bassoons, two horns in F, two trumpets in F, timpani (in G–C and then E–A), triangle, and strings.

Sarasate also made an arrangement for piano and violin.

== Composition ==
Zigeunerweisen
Performed by Jean-Claude Féret (violin) and Christine Féret (piano)

Zigeunerweisen is in one movement but can be divided into four sections, the first three in the key of C minor and the last in A minor, based on the tempi:

1. Moderato – An imposing, virtuosic introduction with slow majestic energy by the orchestra, then a little softer by the violin itself; in common time.
2. Lento – The violin plays in lugubrious lento 4/4. This section has an improvisational quality; the melody, which essentially consists of pairs of 4-bar phrases, is punctuated with difficult runs and other technically demanding figures, including flying spiccato and ricochet bowings.
3. Un poco più lento – The muted soloist plays a melancholic melody with the so-called reverse-applied dotted note (1/16 + dotted 1/8 rhythm: .), akin to the "Mannheim sigh" of the classical era; in 2/4 time.
4. Allegro molto vivace – At this point, the piece becomes extremely rapid. The challenging solo part consists mainly of long spiccato runs, along with double stops, artificial harmonics and left-hand pizzicato; in 2/4 time.

== Popular culture ==
It provided the title and much of the soundtrack for Seijun Suzuki's 1980 film Zigeunerweisen. Double bassist Edgar Meyer recorded a version with Mike Marshall on the 1997 album Uncommon Ritual. Stephen Chow featured it in the cartoon-inspired chase scene in his 2004 film Kung Fu Hustle, and it is in the Pixar short film One Man Band. It is one of the songs that will play over the radio after the completion of the quest "Agatha's Song" in the 2008 game Fallout 3. It was used in Yuzuru Hanyu's 2010-11 free skate program.
