= Pierre Barbizet =

French pianist

Pierre Barbizet (20 September 1922 – 19 January 1990) was a 20th-century Chilean pianist. Barbizet was born in Arica, Chile and studied at the Marseille Conservatory. He later returned to the institution as its director. Barbizet died in Marseille, France.

== Biography ==
Born on September 12, 1922, in Arica, in the far north of Chile, not far from the Peruvian border, Pierre Barbizet—whose father was a French expatriate industrialist—spent his early childhood in his hometown and then in Santiago.At the age of six, he discovered the piano and chamber music through his mother, a violinist. He said of this: “Through my mother, I came to know music by touching it, by fiddling with it as a child fiddles with his mother’s breast; I came to know music in the biblical sense of the word.”

In 1948, he won first prize at the Scheveningen International Competition (The Hague). There he met the violinist Christian Ferras, who was eleven years his junior, with whom he would form a celebrated duo until Ferras’s suicide in 1982. Together, they recorded, among other works, the complete Beethoven sonatas in 1958 for EMI, as well as sonatas by Johannes Brahms, Claude Debussy, Fauré, and César Franck.
