= Carmen Fantasy (Sarasate) =

1881 fantasy by Pablo de Sarasate

- Fantasy by Pablo de Sarasate
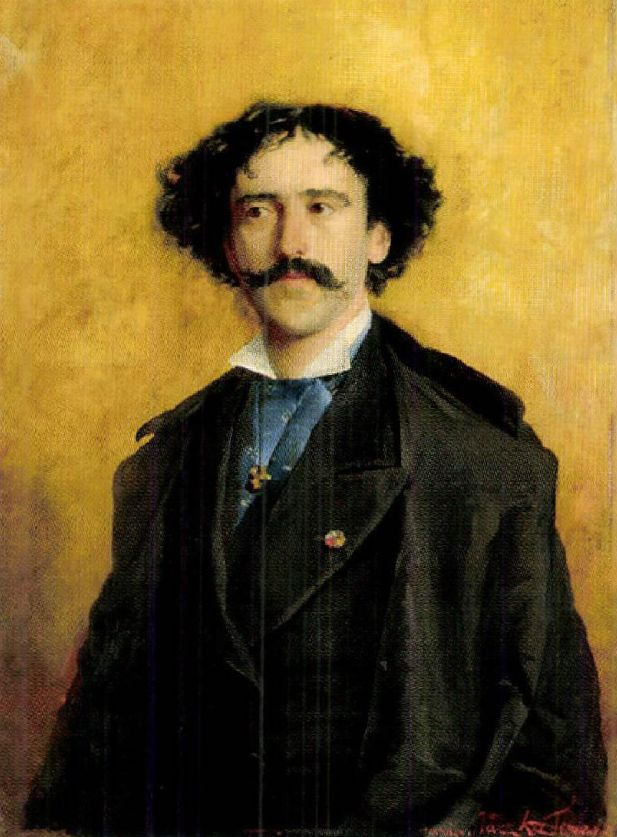
- Sarasate portrayed in 1877
- Opus: 25
- Composed: 1881
- Movements: 5
- Scoring: Violin and piano or orchestra

The Carmen Fantasy, Op. 25, by Pablo de Sarasate is a fantasy on themes from Bizet's Carmen for violin and piano or orchestra, composed in 1881. A version with piano accompaniment was published in 1882. It was dedicated to Joseph Hellmesberger.

The piece contains an adaptation of the Aragonaise, Habanera, an interlude, Seguidilla, and the Gypsy Dance. Sarasate chose specifically the music with a Spanish character. A performance takes approximately 12 minutes.

The Carmen Fantasy is one of Sarasate's best-known works and is often performed in violin competitions. Because of its delicate techniques and sanguineous passion inspired by the opera, it is considered to be one of the most challenging and technically demanding pieces for the violin.

== Movements ==
The work consists of five movements.

1. Allegro moderato
  After a short introduction by the orchestra, the violin plays material from the Aragonaise, the entr'acte to Act 4. Techniques include glissando, flageolet and pizzicato.
2. Moderato
  This movement uses material, extensively ornamented, from the Habanera from Act 1 ("L'amour est un oiseau rebelle").
3. Lento assai
  Carmen's mocking treatment of Zuniga in act 1 ("Tra la la ... Coupe-moi, brûle-moi") is the theme for this movement; it ends in flageolets.
4. Allegro moderato
  The Seguidilla from Act 1 ("Près des remparts de Séville") is here with ornaments including pizzicato, trill, glissando.
5. Moderato
  This movement is based on the scene at the beginning of Act 2 where Carmen and her friends Frasquita and Mercédès are entertaining Zuniga and other officers ("Les tringles des sistres tintaient"). The most technically difficult movement of the five, it employs rapid, moving thirds; fast arpeggios which span the range of the instrument; and a final virtuoso tempo acceleration.

== Orchestration ==
The orchestral version is scored for piccolo and 2 flutes, 2 oboes, 2 clarinets, 2 bassoons, 4 horns, 2 trumpets, 3 trombones, timpani, tambourine, harp and strings. There is also an adaptation of the Carmen Fantasy with piano accompaniment.

== Selected recordings ==
- Augustin Hadelich: Recuerdos - with the WDR Symphony Orchestra Cologne, conducted by Cristian Măcelaru
- Hilary Hahn: Eclipse - with the Frankfurt Radio Symphony, conducted by Andrés Orozco-Estrada

== See also ==
- Carmen Fantasie (Waxman)
- Carmen Variations (Horowitz)
