= Philippe Graffin =

French violinist

Philippe Graffin (born 1964 in Romilly-sur-Seine) is a French violinist. Pupil of Josef Gingold, Philippe Hirschhorn and Viktor Liberman. He has made several recordings for Hyperion Records as well as "Avie Records" and "Onyx". He was born in Romilly-sur-Seine, France.

Composers Rodion Schedrin, Philippe Hersant, David Matthews, Vytautas Barkauskas and Yves Prin have written concertante works dedicated to him.

He is founder of the "Consonances" festival in Saint-Nazaire.
