= Fanny Clamagirand =

French classical violinist (born 1984)

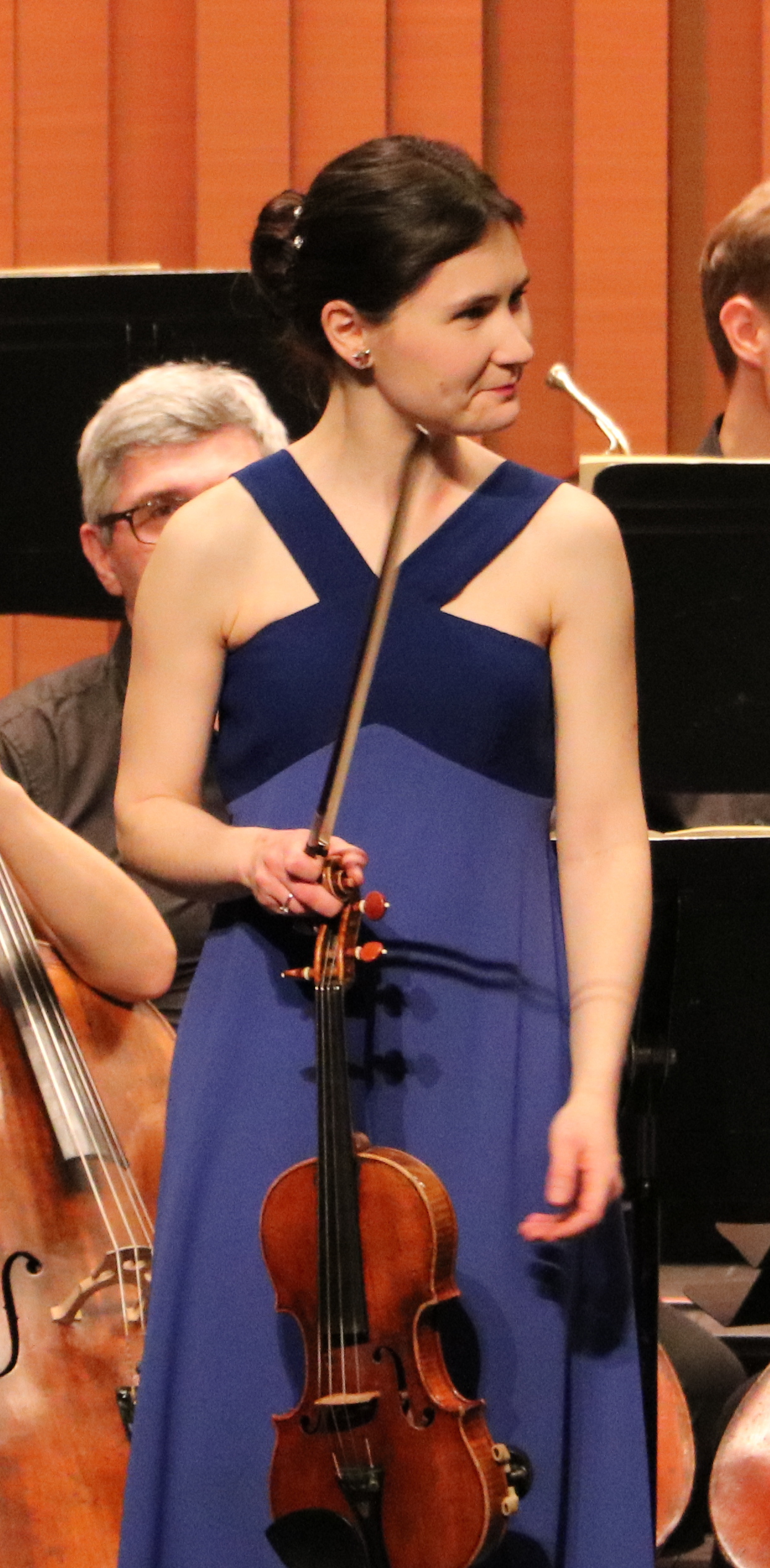
- Clamagirand in 2019
- Born: 1984 (age 41–42)
- Occupation: Violinist
- Years active: 1993–present
- Website: www.fannyclamagirand.com

Fanny Clamagirand (born 1984) is a French classical violinist.

== Biography and career ==
Born in 1984, Clamagirand started playing the violin at the age of seven. She was taught by L. Kolos, before joining J.J. Kantorow's postgraduate course at the CNSMPD (Paris Conservatory) in 2000, when she was sixteen. In 2003, she went on to study with I. Rashkovsky at London's Royal College of Music, where she was awarded her "Artist's Diploma" (2004). Then, she was coached by P.Vernikov at the Konservatorium in Vienna and Oleksandr Semchuk at the Scuola di Musica di Fiesole (Italy).

Clamagirand has been performing as a soloist in concert from the age of nine. She has appeared at numerous venues and festivals such as Wigmore and Royal Festival Halls in London, Victoria Hall in Geneva, Konzerthaus and Musikverein in Vienna, Konzerthaus in Berlin, KKL in Lucerne, Smetana Hall in Prague, DR Konzerthuset in Copenhagen, Toppan Hall in Tokyo, OperaHouse in Tel-Aviv, Cultural Center in Chicago, Zankel Hall in New York, Academia Santa Cecilia in Roma, Circulo de Bellas Artes in Madrid, Teatro Municipal in Rio de Janeiro, Louisiana Modern Art Museum in Copenhagen, Opera of Montecarlo, Grand Théâtre de Provence in Aix, Arsenal de Metz, Théâtre des Champs-Elysées, UNESCO, Salle Gaveau and Auditorium du Louvre in Paris, Montpellier Radio France Festival, Colmar Festival, Lucerne Festival, Verbier Festival, Enescu Festival, Haydn Festspiele, Menuhin Festival in Gstaad, Lockenhaus Kammermusikfest, Musikfest Bremen, Carintischer Sommer Festival, West Cork Chamber Music Festival, Chelsea Music Festival in New York.

Clamagirand plays on a Matteo Goffriller violin made in Venice in 1700.

== Selected recordings ==
- Eugène Ysaÿe: Complete Sonatas for solo violin, Fanny Clamagirand, violin (Nascor 2007)
- Camille Saint-Saëns : Complete Violin Concertos, n^{os} 1, 2 & 3, Fanny Clamagirand, violin - Sinfonia Finlandia Jyväskylä, conducted by Patrick Gallois (Naxos 2009)
- Camille Saint-Saëns: Music for Violin and Piano, Fanny Clamagirand, violin, Vanya Cohen, piano (Volume 1 & 2 Naxos 2013)
- Ludwig Van Beethoven : Violin Concerto, Peteris Vasks, '"Distant Light", Violin Concerto, Fanny Clamagirand, violin - English Chamber Orchestra conducted by Ken-David Masur (Mirare 2020)
- Camille Saint-Saëns: Danse macabre, Introduction et Rondo Capricioso, Prière, Caprice andalou, Le Déluge, Jota aragonaise, Havanaise, Air de Dalila, Caprice d’après l’étude en forme de valse, Fanny Clamagirand, violin, Vanya Cohen, piano, (Naxos 2021)
- Florence Price : Violin Concertos Nos 1 and 2, Fanny Clamagirand, violin, Malmö Opera Orchestra, conducted by John Jeter (Naxos 2025)

== Awards ==
- First Prize winner of the 2007 Monte Carlo Violin Masters
- ADAMI Classical Revelation 2006
- First Prize winner of the 2005 International Fritz Kreisler Violin Competition
- Emily Anderson Prize of the Royal Philharmonic Society in 2004 in London
- Special Jury Prize Yehudi Menuhin 2000
- Fifth Prize Henryk Wieniawski 1997
- First Prize Louis Spohr 1995
