= Patrick Gallois =

French flutist and conductor (born 1956)

Patrick Gallois (born 1956) is a French flutist and conductor.

Gallois was born in Linselles near the town of Lille in the north of France. At the age of 17 he began studies at the Conservatoire de Paris with the celebrated flutist Jean-Pierre Rampal and after two years received the First Prize. At the age of 21 he became principal flutist of the Orchestre National de France under Lorin Maazel. He served in that capacity from 1977 to 1984. In 1984 he left this post for a career as a flute soloist and, later, conductor.

Gallois has played under many famous conductors, including Leonard Bernstein, Karl Böhm, Pierre Boulez, Sergiu Celibidache, Eugen Jochum, and Seiji Ozawa. He also regularly collaborates in chamber music with Yuri Bashmet, Jörg Demus, Natalia Gutman, the Lindsay String Quartet, and Peter Schreier. Formerly he performed with Jean-Pierre Rampal and the harpist Lily Laskine.

Gallois has had an exclusive recording contract with Deutsche Grammophon and, more recently, has recorded with Naxos. His discography currently includes some 75 recordings.

He has been teaching at the Accademia Musicale Chigiana since 1999.

From 2003 to 2012 Gallois was the music director of Jyväskylä Sinfonia in Jyväskylä, Finland. He toured with the orchestra in Europe and Japan.

== Selected recordings ==
=== Conductor ===
- Camille Saint-Saëns, Violin concertos n°1, n°2, n°3, Fanny Clamagirand, violin, Sinfonia Finlandia Jyväskilä, conductor Patrick Gallois. CD Naxos 2009
