= Pablo de Sarasate =

Spanish violinist and composer (1844–1908)

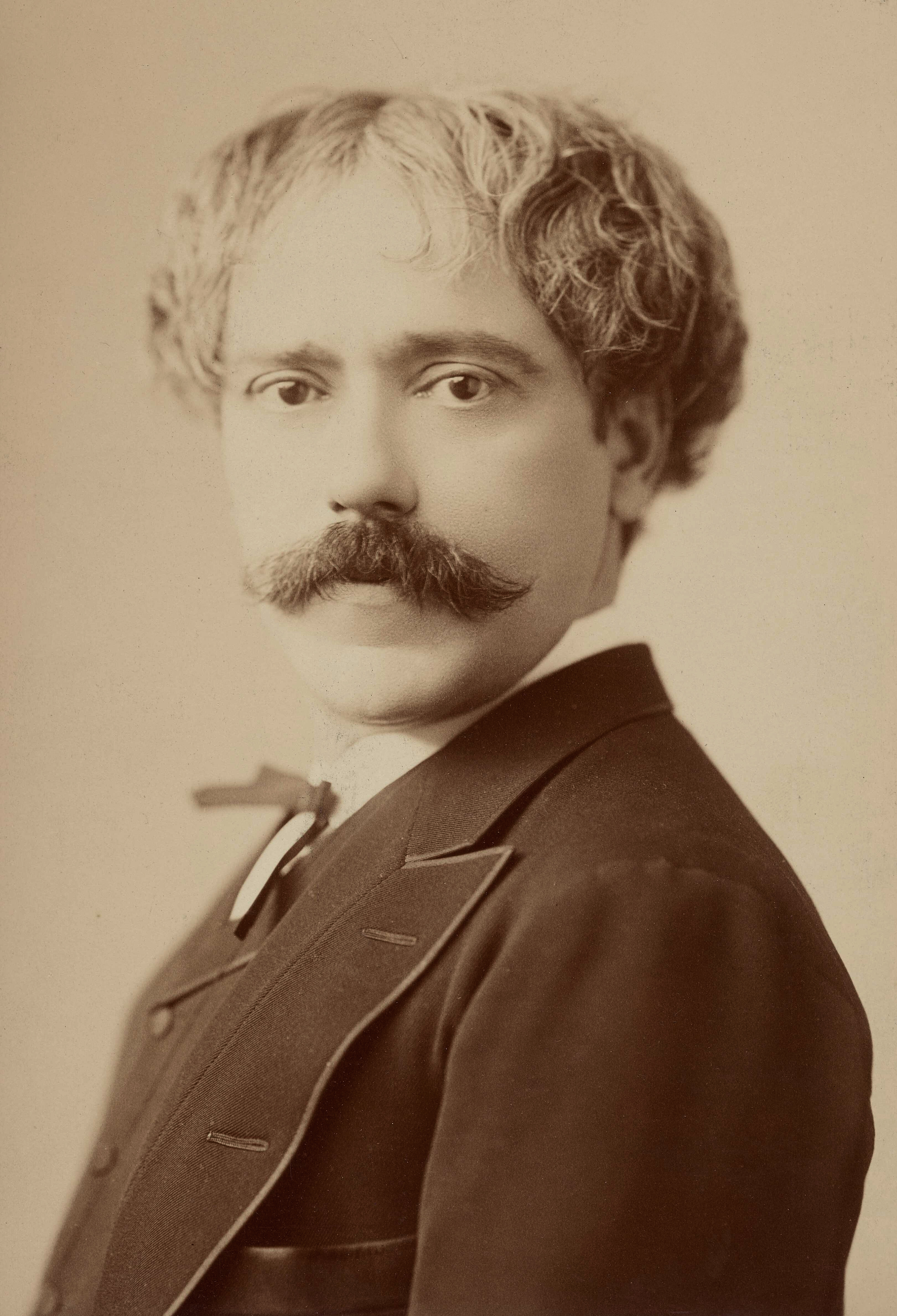
- Pablo de Sarasate, c. 1890 (Newberry Library, Chicago)
- Born: Pablo Martín Melitón de Sarasate y Navascués; 10 March 1844; Pamplona, Spain
- Died: 20 September 1908 (aged 64); Biarritz, France
- Occupations: Violinist; composer; conductor
- Years active: 1852–1904
- Relatives: Francisca Sarasate (sister)

Pablo Martín Melitón de Sarasate y Navascués (Spanish pronunciation: [ˈpaβlo saɾaˈsate]; 10 March 1844 – 20 September 1908) was a Spanish virtuoso violinist, composer, and conductor of the Romantic period. His best known works include Zigeunerweisen (Gypsy Airs), the Spanish Dances, and the Carmen Fantasy.

== Biography ==
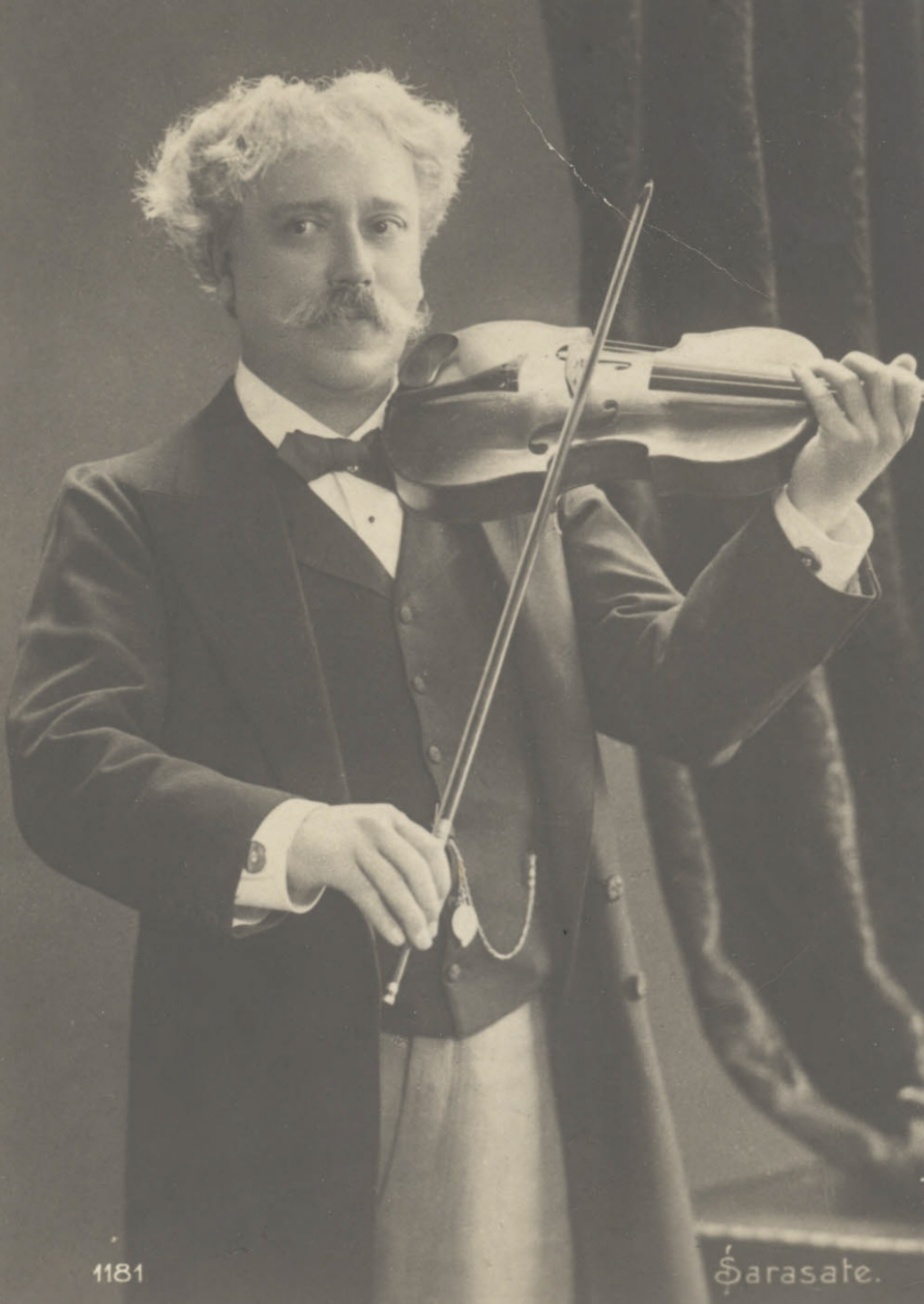
Pablo de Sarasate in 1905

Sarasate was born in Pamplona, Navarre, in 1844, the son of Don Miguel Sarasate, a local artillery bandmaster. Apparently, after seeing his father struggle with a passage for a long time, he picked up the violin and played it perfectly. He began studying the violin with his father at the age of five and later took lessons from a local teacher. His musical talent became evident early on and he appeared in his first public concert in La Coruña at the age of eight.

His performance was well-received, and caught the attention of a wealthy patron who provided the funding for Sarasate to study under Manuel Rodríguez Saez in Madrid, where he gained the favor of Queen Isabella II. Later, as his abilities developed, his parents decided to send him to study under Jean-Delphin Alard at the Paris Conservatoire at the age of twelve. Aboard the train en route to Paris, his mother (who had been accompanying him) died of a heart attack at the Spanish-French border, and Sarasate was found to be suffering from cholera. The Spanish Consul in Bayonne took Sarasate to his home and nursed him back to health, then financed his trip to Paris.

There, Sarasate auditioned successfully for Alard, who arranged for him to live with his colleague Théodore de Lassabathie, administrator of the Conservatoire. At seventeen, Sarasate entered a competition for the Premier Prix and won his first prize, the Conservatoire's highest honor. (No other Spanish violinist achieved this until Manuel Quiroga did so in 1911; Quiroga was frequently compared to Sarasate throughout his career).

Sarasate, who had been publicly performing since childhood, made his Paris debut as a concert violinist in 1860, and played in London the following year. Over the course of his career, he toured many parts of the world, performing in Europe, North America, and South America. His artistic pre-eminence was due principally to the purity of his tone, which was free from any tendency towards the sentimental or rhapsodic, and to that impressive facility of execution that made him a virtuoso. In his early career, Sarasate performed mainly opera fantasies, most notably the Carmen Fantasy, and various other pieces that he had composed. The popularity of Sarasate's Spanish flavour in his compositions is reflected in the work of his contemporaries. For example, the influences of Spanish music can be heard in such notable works as Édouard Lalo's Symphonie espagnole which was dedicated to Sarasate; Georges Bizet's Carmen; and Camille Saint-Saëns' Introduction and Rondo Capriccioso, written expressly for Sarasate and dedicated to him.

Zigeunerweisen
Zigeunerweisen for violin and piano, performed by Jean-Claude and Christine Féret

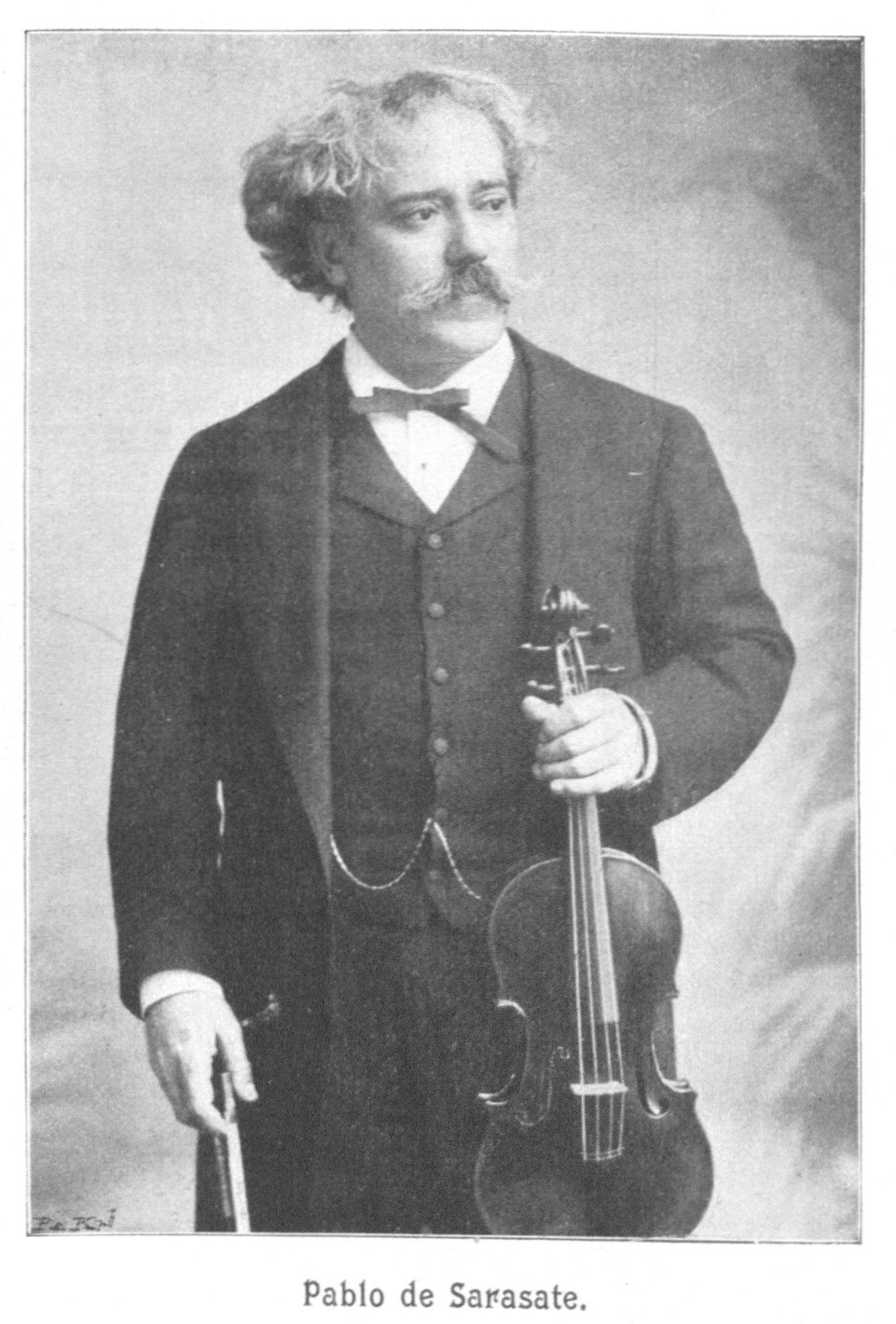
Photo of Sarasate from an Austrian newspaper in 1906

Of Sarasate's idiomatic writing for his instrument, the playwright and music critic George Bernard Shaw once declared that though there were many composers of music for the violin, there were but few composers of violin music. Of Sarasate's talents as performer and composer, Shaw said that he "left criticism gasping miles behind him". Sarasate's own compositions are mainly show-pieces designed to demonstrate his exemplary technique. Perhaps the best known of his works is Zigeunerweisen (1878), a work for violin and orchestra. Another piece, the Carmen Fantasy (1883), also for violin and orchestra, makes use of themes from Georges Bizet's opera Carmen. Probably his most performed encores are his four books of Spanish Dances, Opp. 21, 22, 23, 26, brief pieces designed to please the listener's ear and show off the performer's talent. He also made arrangements of a number of other composers' work for violin, and composed sets of variations on "potpourris" drawn from operas familiar to his audiences, such as his Fantasia on La forza del destino (his Opus 1), his "Souvenirs de Faust", or his variations on themes from Die Zauberflöte.

At Brussels, he met Berthe Marx, who traveled with him as soloist and accompanist on his tours through Europe, Mexico, and the US; playing in about 600 concerts. She also arranged Sarasate's Spanish Dances for the piano. In 1904, he made a small number of recordings. In all his travels Sarasate returned to Pamplona each year for the San Fermín festival.

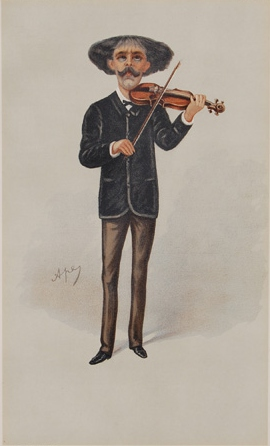
The familiar figure of Sarasate caricatured as a "Man of the Day" for Vanity Fair, 1889

Sarasate died in Biarritz, France, on 20 September 1908, from chronic bronchitis. He bequeathed his violin, made by Antonio Stradivari in 1724, to the Musée de la Musique. The violin now bears his name as the Sarasate Stradivarius in his memory. His second Stradivari violin, the Boissier of 1713, is now owned by Real Conservatorio Superior de Música, Madrid. Among his violin pupils were Alfred de Sève and M. J. Niedzielski. The Pablo Sarasate International Violin Competition is held in Pamplona.

A number of works for violin were dedicated to Sarasate, including Henryk Wieniawski's Violin Concerto No. 2, Édouard Lalo's Symphonie espagnole, Camille Saint-Saëns' Violin Concerto No. 3 and his Introduction and Rondo Capriccioso, Max Bruch's Scottish Fantasy, and Alexander Mackenzie's Pibroch Suite. Also inspired by Sarasate is William H. Potstock's Souvenir de Sarasate.

== Appearance in other art forms ==
- James Whistler's Arrangement in Black: Pablo de Sarasate (1884) is a portrait of Pablo Sarasate.
- In Arthur Conan Doyle's short story The Red-Headed League (1891), Sherlock Holmes and Dr. John H. Watson attend a concert by Sarasate. Violinist Bruce Dukov portrays Sarasate in the 1984 Granada Television adaptation of the story.
- Sarasate is a major figure in Murder to Music, a Sherlock Holmes pastiche by Anthony Burgess. Holmes is also mentioned as attending a Sarasate concert in The Treasure Train by Frankie Thomas.
- In Edith Wharton's 1920 novel The Age of Innocence, set in 1870s New York, the main protagonist is invited to a private recital to be given by Sarasate.
- Zigeunerweisen is the title of Seijun Suzuki's 1980 movie, the first of the so-called Taisho Trilogy. A recording of the air of the same title by Sarasate, and his that can be heard on the recording, are one of the themes of the movie.
- He appears in Mercedes Lackey's Elemental Masters story A Study in Sable (based on the folk tale "The Twa Sisters"), as an Elemental Master of Spirit, able to conjure, speak with, and to some extent control ghosts with his music; he even goes so far as to use a bow made of the bone and hair of a murdered woman in an effort to bring her murderous sister to justice.

== List of compositions ==
Romanza andaluza
from Book II of the Spanish Dances, performed by Carrie Rehkopf

Navarra for two violins and orchestra, Op. 33
performed by Roxana Pavel Goldstein and Elias Goldstein (violins) with the Depaul Symphony (Chicago) conducted by Cliff Colnot

Sarasate composed more than fifty works, all of which include the violin. He assigned opus numbers to 54 of them.

Opus	Composition	Year	Instrumentation
—	Chopin (arr. Sarasate) Nocturne Op.9 No.2		Violin and piano
—	Moszkowski (arr. Sarasate) Guitarre Op.45 No.2	1890	Violin and piano
—	Fantaisie-Caprice	1862	Violin and piano
—	Los pájaros de Chile (The Birds of Chile)	1871	Violin and piano
—	Mazurka en mi (Mazurka in E)		Violin and piano
—	Souvenir de Faust (Gounod)	1865	Violin and piano
1	Fantasy on La forza del destino (Verdi)		Violin and piano
2	Homenaje a Rossini	1866	Violin and piano
3	La dame blanche (Boieldieu)		Violin and orchestra
4	Réverie (Dream)	1866	Violin and piano
5	Fantasy on Roméo et Juliette (Gounod)	1868	Violin and piano
6	Caprice on Mireille		Violin and piano
7	Confidences		Violin and piano
8	Souvenir de Domont (Vals de salón)		Violin and piano
9	Les Adieux (The Farewell)	1899 (?)	Violin and piano
10	Sérénade Andalouse (Andalusian Serenade)		Violin and piano
11	Le sommeil (The Sleep)		Violin and piano
12	Moscovienne (Muscovite)		Violin and piano
13	New Fantasy on Faust (Gounod)	1874	Violin and orchestra
14	Fantasy on Der Freischütz (Weber)	1874	Violin and orchestra
15	Mosaíque de Zampa (Herold)		Violin and piano
16	Gavota on Mignon (Thomas)	1869	Violin and piano
17	Prière et Berceuse (Prayer and Lullaby)	1870	Violin and piano
18	Airs espagnols (Spanish Airs)	1874 (?)	Violin and piano
19	Réminiscence on Martha (Flothow)		Violin and piano
20	Aires Bohemios, Zigeunerweisen (Gypsy Airs)	1878	Violin and orchestra
21	Malagueña y Habanera (Spanish Dances Nos. 1, 2 - Book I)	1878	Violin and piano
22	Romanza andaluza y Jota navarra (Spanish Dances Nos. 3, 4 - Book II)	1878	Violin and piano
23	Playera y Zapateado (Spanish Dances Nos. 5, 6 - Book III)	1880	Violin and piano
24	Caprice Basque (Basque Caprice)	1880	Violin and piano
25	Fantasy on Carmen (Bizet)	1882	Violin and orchestra
26	Vito y Habanera (Spanish Dances Nos.7, 8 - Book IV)	1881 ca.	Violin and piano
27	Jota aragonesa		Violin and piano
28	Serenata andaluza (Andalusian serenade)	1883	Violin and piano
29	El canto del ruiseñor (The Nightingale's Song)		Violin and orchestra
30	Bolero	1885	Violin and piano
31	Balada (Ballade)	1885	Violin and piano
32	Muiñeira	1885	Violin and orchestra
33	Navarra	1889	2 Violins and orchestra
34	Airs Écossais (Scottish Airs)	1872	Violin and orchestra
35	Peteneras, Caprice espagnol		Violin and piano
36	Jota de San Fermín	1894	Violin and piano
37	Zortzico Adiós montañas mías	1895	Violin and piano
38	Viva Sevilla!(Live Seville!)	1896	Violin and orchestra
39	Zortzico de Iparraguirre		Violin and piano
40	Introduction et Fandango varié (Introduction and Fandango Variations)		Violin and piano
41	Introduction et Caprice-jota (Introduction and Caprice-Jota)	1899	Violin and orchestra
42	Zortzico Miramar	1899	Violin and orchestra
43	Introduction et Tarantelle (Introduction and Tarantella)	1900	Violin and orchestra
44	La chasse (The Hunt)	1901	Violin and orchestra
45	Nocturno - Serenata (Nocturne - Serenade)	1901	Violin and orchestra
46	Gondoliéra Veneziana		Violin and piano
47	Melodía rumana (Romanian Melody)	1901	Violin and piano
48	L'Esprit Follet	1904	Violin and orchestra
49	Canciones rusas (Russian Songs)	1904	Violin and orchestra
50	Jota de Pamplona (Pamplona's Jota)	1904	Violin and orchestra
51	Fantasy on Don Giovanni (Mozart)		Violin and piano
52	Jota de Pablo (Pablo's Jota)	1906	Violin and orchestra
53	Le Rève (The Dream)	1908	Violin and piano
54	Fantasy on Die Zauberflöte (Mozart)	1908	Violin and orchestra
