= Léon van Hout =

Belgian violist (1864–1945)

Léon van Hout (28 November 1864 in Liège – 23 November 1945 in Brussels) was a Belgian violist and music educator.

From 1888 to 1894 van Hout was the violist of the Ysaÿe Quartet along with cellist Joseph Jacob, and violinists Mathieu Crickboom and Eugène Ysaÿe. He was principal violist of the Théâtre Royal de la Monnaie from 1889.

Van Hout was professor of viola at Royal Conservatory of Brussels from 1893. He taught a generation of Belgian violists including Robert Courte, who succeeded him at the Conservatory, Charles Foidart, Lionel Blomme, and Gaston Jacobs. Van Hout inspired many Belgian composers to write works for the viola.

== Dedications ==
- Jean Absil (1893–1974)

Concerto for viola and orchestra, Op. 54 (1942)

- Francis de Bourguignon (1890–1961)

Suite for viola and orchestra, Op. 67 (1940)

- Raymond Chevreuille (1901–1976)

Double Concerto in E♭ major for viola, piano and orchestra, Op. 34 (1946)
Quartet for 4 violas, Op. 24 (1942)

- Albert Huybrechts (1899–1938)

Pastourelle for viola and piano (1934)
Sonatine for flute and viola (1934)

- Séraphin Lonque (1873–1943)

Concerto No. 1 in G minor for viola and orchestra, Op. 13

- Léopold Wallner (1847–1913)

Suite Polonaise for viola (viola alta) and piano (1896)
