= Manuel Quiroga (violinist) =

Spanish violinist and composer (1892–1961)

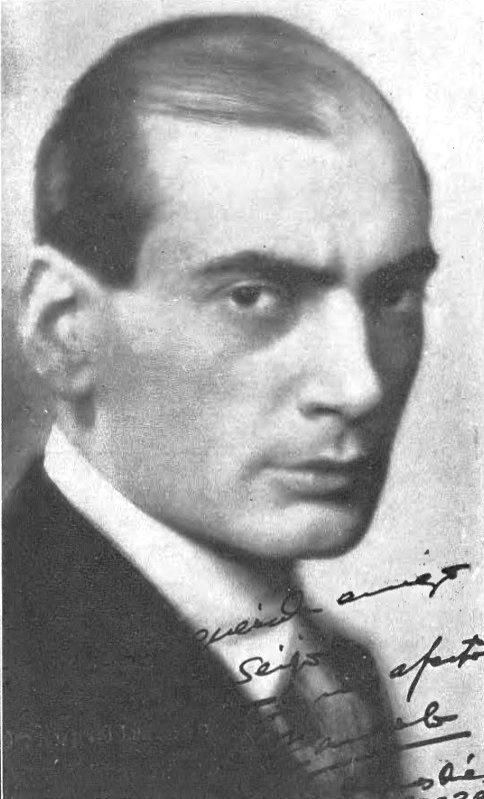

Background information
- Born: Manuel Quiroga Losada; 15 April 1892; Pontevedra, Spain
- Died: 19 April 1961 (aged 69) Pontevedra, Spain
- Occupations: Composer, violinist
- Instrument: Violin

Manuel Quiroga Losada (15 April 1892 – 19 April 1961) was a Spanish violinist and composer. He was described by music critics as "the finest successor of Pablo de Sarasate", and he is sometimes referred to as "Sarasate's spiritual heir". Enrique Granados, Eugène Ysaÿe (whose sixth Solo Sonata is dedicated to Quiroga) and other composers dedicated compositions to him. Violinists Ysaÿe, Fritz Kreisler, George Enescu, Mischa Elman and Jascha Heifetz, as well as composers such as Igor Stravinsky and Jean Sibelius, held Quiroga's artistry in great regard. Portuguese cellist Guilhermina Suggia described his playing of Tartini's Devil's Trill Sonata as "marvellous and flawless".

Quiroga was also a composer of two violin concertos, sets of variations, studies and smaller violin pieces, and cadenzas to major concertos from the core repertoire. He was the first to extensively use Galician nationalistic folklore as the basis of classical music compositions, and he was also a caricaturist and portraitist in oil and charcoal.

In 1937, Quiroga was involved in a traffic accident in New York City, which left him with a paralysed arm and ended his playing career.

== Biography ==
=== Early years ===
Manuel Quiroga Losada was born in Pontevedra, Galicia, Spain in 1892. His first study of the violin was with a local amateur named Juan Sayago. He then moved on to a more qualified teacher, Benito Medal. He gave his first public concert in 1900, at the age of 8. He gave other concerts, on 12 July 1903 at the Cafe Moderno in Pontevedra, and in 1904 at the Circulo Mercantil in Santiago de Compostela. In June 1904, he was awarded a grant to study at the Madrid Royal Conservatory with José del Hierro, an exponent of the Franco-Belgian school of violin playing who was considered the leading Spanish violinist of his time. In 1906 he was given a 1682 Amati violin by an admiring family. He continued to give concerts in Madrid and throughout Galicia while he studied.

His skill as a graphic artist was also starting to reveal itself by this time. In 1907 some of his early drawings and caricatures were published in the magazine Galicia, in Madrid.

In 1909 he and his father set out for Berlin, Germany to take lessons with Fritz Kreisler, whose playing he greatly admired. However, while in Paris en route they decided Manuel should audition for a place at the Conservatoire de Paris, and his name was the first among several hundred candidates to be accepted. There he studied with Édouard Nadaud (1862–1928) and Jules Boucherit; he also had some lessons with Jacques Thibaud in 1911. He also associated with George Enescu and Eugène Ysaÿe, and learned some of Kreisler's compositions, while enjoying the friendship of Manuel de Falla, Joaquín Turina, Pablo Casals, Darius Milhaud, the cellist Juan Ruiz Casaux and the French pianist Marthe Lehman, a fellow student at the Conservatoire. Her family helped Quiroga financially and arranged social introductions.

=== Early adulthood ===
On 4 July 1911, aged 19, Quiroga won the Conservatoire's Première Prix nommé, awarded by a jury that included Gabriel Fauré, Kreisler, Thibaud, Boucherit, Lucien Capet and Martin Pierre Marsick. He was the first Spanish winner of the prize since Pablo de Sarasate in 1861. Other prizes and awards followed, such as the Prix Sarasate and the Prix Jules Garcin.

Quiroga was a soloist in performances with the Conservatory Orchestra and the Concerts Lamoureux. In a concert in his home town Pontevedra on 26 August 1911 he was accompanied on the piano by Enrique Granados, who became his friend. He then gave a large number of highly successful concerts throughout Spain and France, often appearing with chamber associates such as the cellist Juan Ruiz Casaux, and the pianists José Cubiles (who premiered de Falla's Nights in the Gardens of Spain in 1916) and José Iturbi. He made Paris his base, and he associated there with musicians such as Paul Paray, Manuel Infante, Joaquín Nin and Ricardo Viñes, along with Casals, Falla, Turina, Milhaud and others. He made some recordings in April 1912. In 1913 he was contracted to the concert promoter Jos J. Schürmann, who also managed Jan Kubelík, Ignacy Jan Paderewski, Isadora Duncan and other artists.

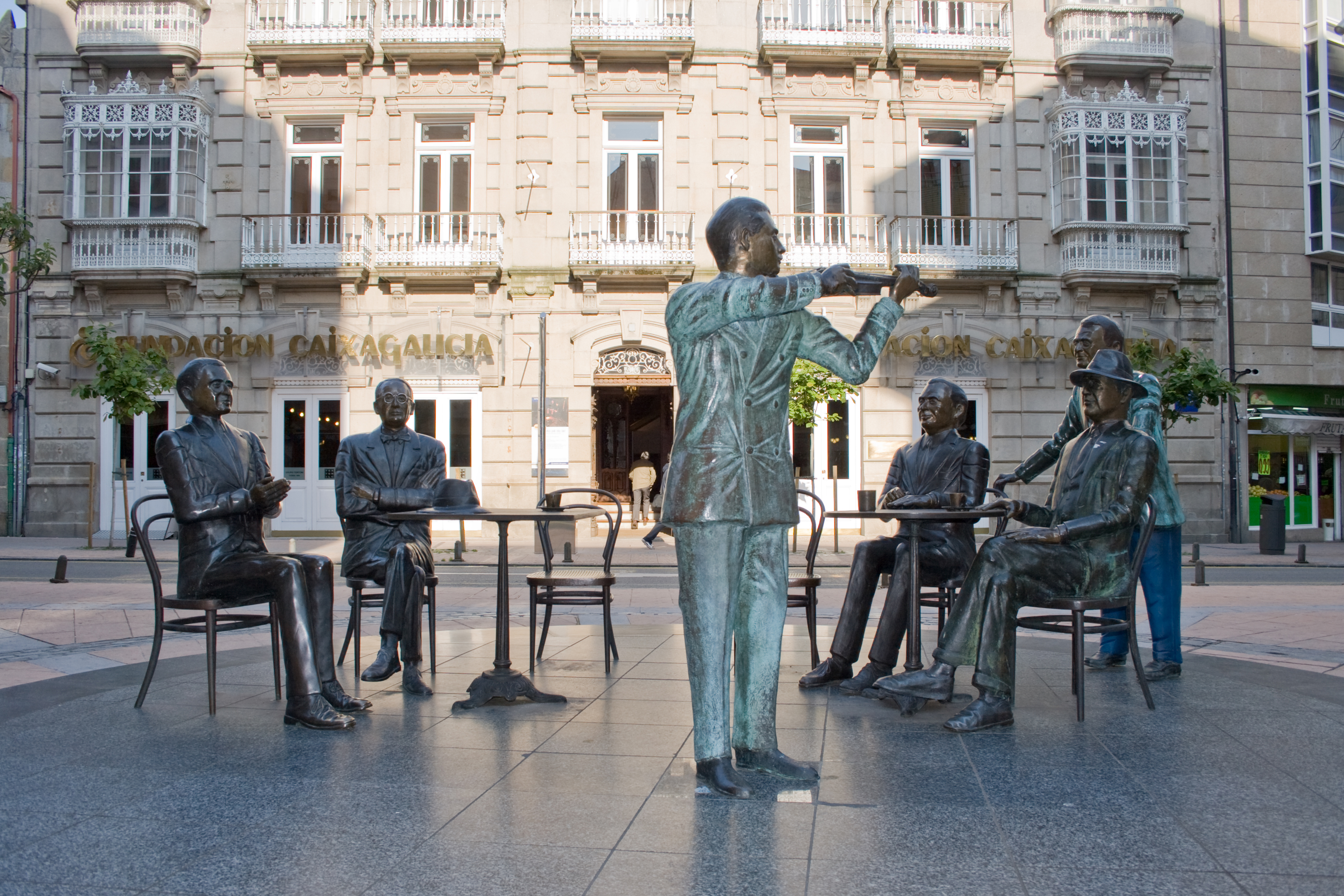
Statue of Quiroga with friends, in Pontevedra, by César Lombera.

At the start of World War I, he was giving concerts in Austria with José Iturbi when he was accused of espionage and jailed for a short time, until the intercession of the Spanish king Alfonso XIII secured his release. The war led to the cancellation of that European tour, but it opened the door to new horizons in the United States, which was still neutral. Before setting out, he married Marthe Lehman on 21 July 1915. He made four highly successful tours of the United States and Canada during the war years, starting in 1914, again including Cubiles and Casaux. His American debut was before an audience of 5,000 people at the New York Hippodrome. Other great violinists such as Mischa Elman, Efrem Zimbalist and Albert Spalding attended his concerts. He refused a fifth planned American tour when his friend Enrique Granados drowned in the English Channel while returning from New York City in 1916, a victim of a German submarine torpedo attack. In 1918–19 he made a major tour of Spain and Portugal, often with José Iturbi as his associate artist. In Galicia, he was widely hailed as the most notable Galician artist of the day, and he was even at times used as a symbol for the Galician nationalistic movement. He was named an honorary member of the Madrid Philharmonic Orchestra and was appointed one of King Alfonso XIII's court musicians.

=== Professional success ===
The years between the two world wars were the height of Quiroga's career. After the war, he returned to Spain and received a huge public reception at the Palau de la Música Catalana in Barcelona. He made his British debut in 1919, and played in many notable venues there such as the Wigmore Hall in London (14 April 1920). Then followed more concerts all over Europe: Portugal, France, Germany, Austria, Switzerland and Belgium. He was often accompanied by pianists such as Iturbi, Paul Paray (he premiered Paray's Sonata for Violin and Piano with the composer at the piano in 1922) and Juan José Castro. His wife Marthe Lehman (Madame Quiroga) was just as often his accompanist. The first of his compositions appeared in print in 1921.

In 1923 Eugène Ysaÿe dedicated the last of his Six Sonatas for solo violin to Quiroga, the other dedicatees being Joseph Szigeti, Jacques Thibaud, George Enescu, Fritz Kreisler and Mathieu Crickboom.

It is in remembering the Spanish violinist's playing style, which reminded him [Ysaye] of Sarasate, that the master conceived his last Sonata for unaccompanied violin. Here, even more than in the others, the master endeavors to adapt the violinistic writing to the playing of the artist to whom the work is dedicated. Quiroga never performed it publicly.

He returned to the United States in 1924, where his two Carnegie Hall concerts amazed Mischa Elman. He also played under the baton of Arturo Toscanini. Back in Britain he played with the London Symphony Orchestra under Sir Thomas Beecham, touring as well in Belgium and Spain.

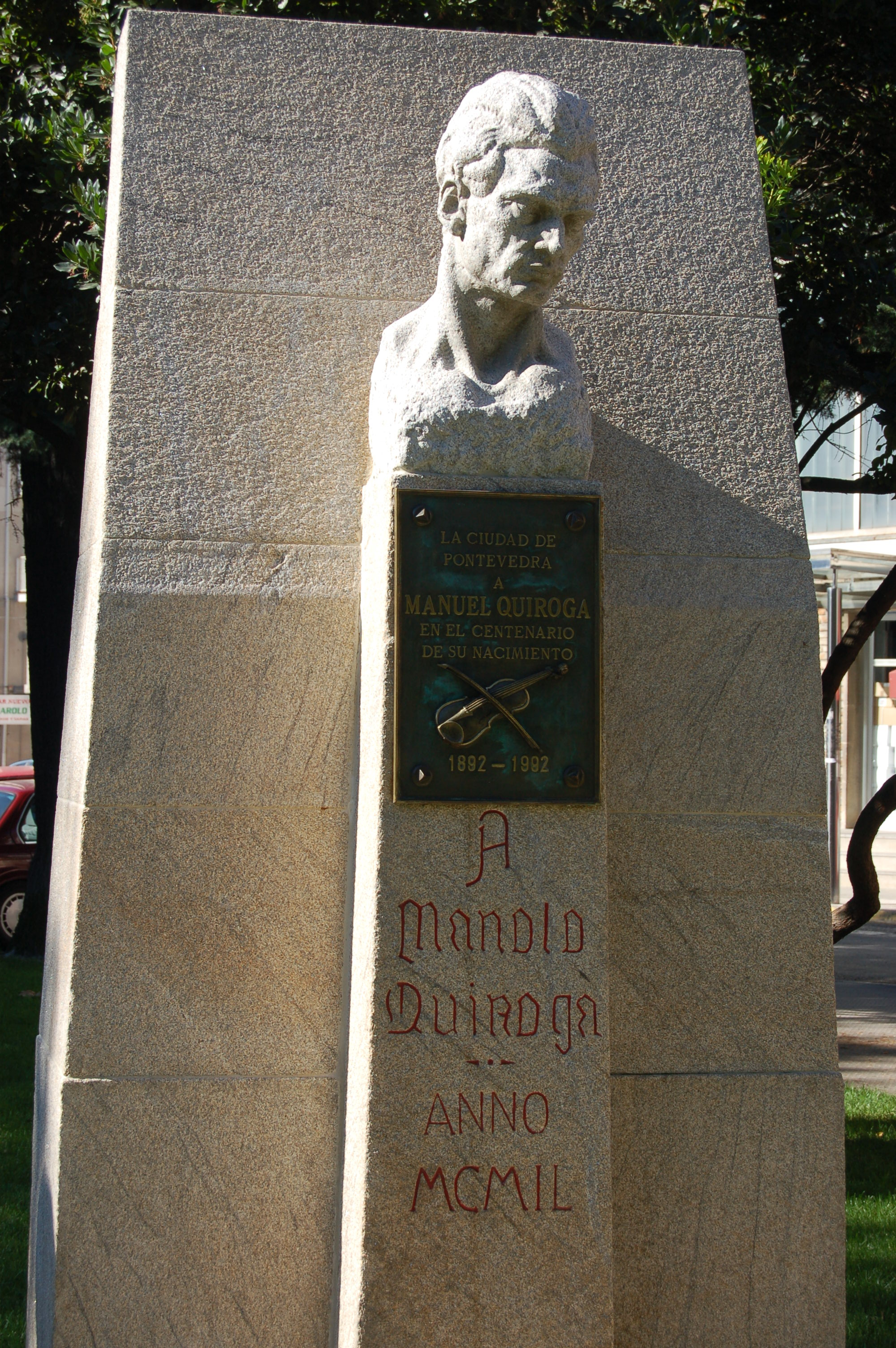
Memorial to Manuel Quiroga in Pontevedra.

On 31 March 1925 in A Coruña, Manuel Quiroga premiered a major composition of his own, Concierto de Intrata. He later renamed this Primer Concierto en el estilo antiguo (First Concerto in the old style). He often performed this work during his career, but mostly in an arrangement for violin and piano. In June 1925 he was admitted to the Société des auteurs, compositeurs et éditeurs de musique in Paris.

He made his first South American tour in 1926, visiting Argentina and Uruguay, followed by Cuba, Mexico and the United States once more. He made a series of recordings of short pieces in 1928 for RCA Victor and Pathé. He also completed a self-portrait in oil in 1930.

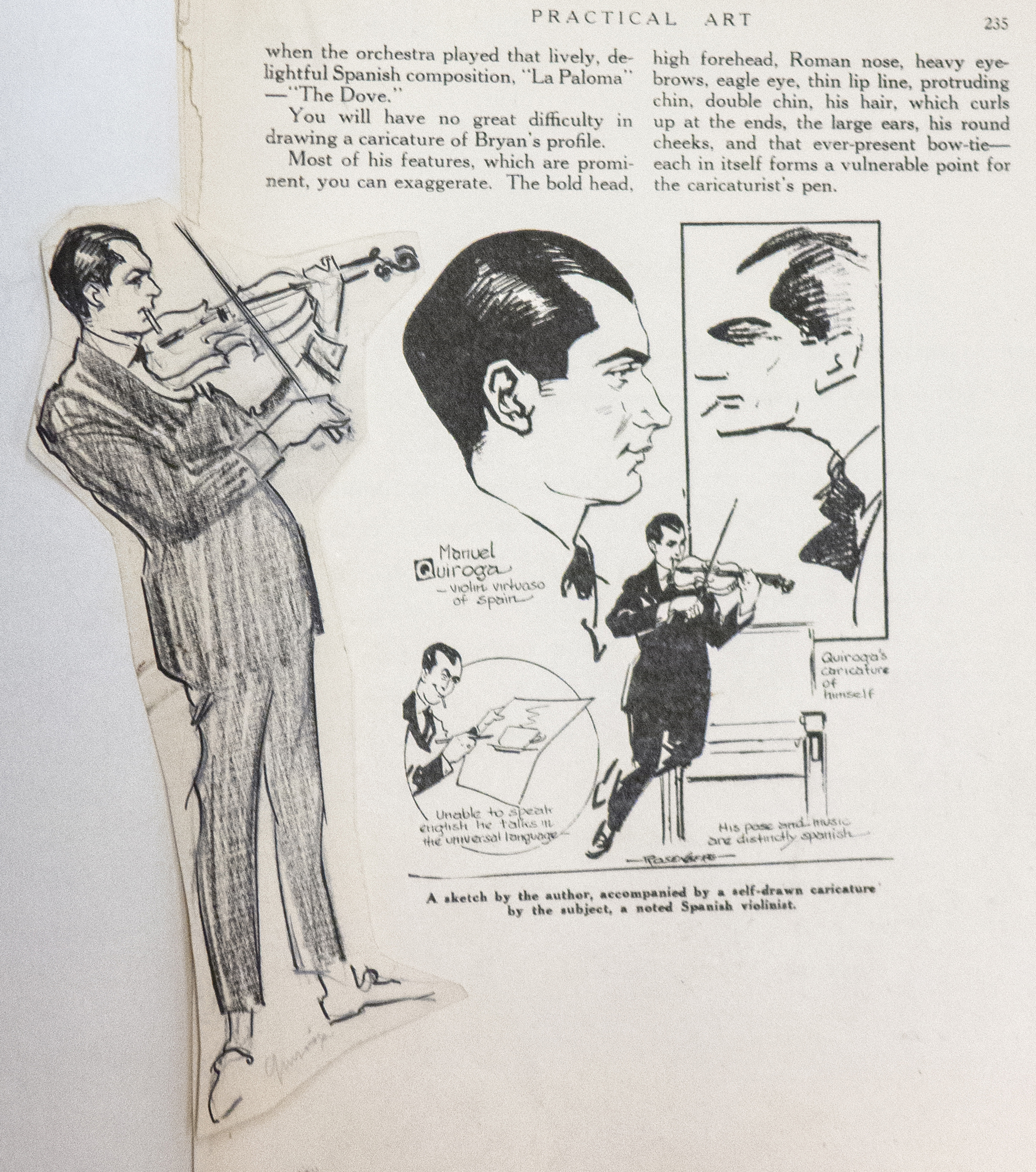
Manuel Quiroga autographed drawings by Manuel Rosenberg and caricature of himself, 1924

He made more tours of America in 1933 and 1937, where he gave recitals with Mischa Levitzki and José Iturbi, and concerts with the New York Philharmonic under the baton of George Enescu (playing Édouard Lalo's Symphonie espagnole in February 1937). He also continued to premiere his own compositions such as "Danza Argentina" and "Canto y Danza Andaluza". In this last tour he also played Joaquín Turina's 1934 Sonata "Española", Op. 82, in his New York concerts, even though the piece was not premiered in Spain until 1941.

=== Accident and retirement ===
On 8 June 1937, following a New York recital with Iturbi, Quiroga was hit by a truck while crossing Times Square. He survived and continued his career for some time, but progressively lost feeling and mobility in his arm, and was forced to retire from performing.

He returned to Spain and continued painting, entering competitions, and completing two more self-portraits. He also sought out the company of important figures in the art world such as the painter Ignacio Zuloaga, the sculptor Francisco Asorey, and many others. He had earlier met Joaquín Sorolla. In 1940 he made an extensive series of caricatures of his friends: Fritz Kreisler, José Iturbi, Eugène Ysaÿe, Pablo Casals, Carlos Chávez, Andrés Segovia, Arthur Rubinstein, Lucien Capet, Ricardo Viñes, Jacques Thibaud, and others.

He also continued composing, but was later stricken by Parkinson's disease. He became virtually confined to a sanatorium in Madrid, and in 1959 moved back to his home town of Pontevedra, where he was cared for by his second wife Maria Eladia Galvani Bolognini (whom he called Gigi). He died there on 19 April 1961, aged 69.

== Recordings ==
Manuel Quiroga recorded no major repertoire such as sonatas or concertos. He made recordings of numerous short pieces in 1912 and again in 1928. Most or all of these are included in a recording called "Great Violinists, Volume 5", issued by Symposium Records.

The pieces include works by Albéniz, Falla, Kreisler, Sarasate, Wieniawski and others, and importantly, four of his own compositions: Segunda Guajira, Danza española, Rondalla, and Canto amoroso.

== Dedications ==
Musical works dedicated to Manuel Quiroga included:

- Enrique Granados: Violin Sonata (one movement)
- Eugène Ysaÿe: Sonata No. 6 for solo violin
- Eduardo Fabini (1882–1950): Fantasía para violin y orquesta
- Joaquín Nin: Sur un air de danse de Pablo Esteve, 1779, the fifth of "Cinq comentaires"
- Marcel Samuel-Rousseau: Les Promis
- Édouard Nadaud: the fifth of his Six Études de Concert
- César Espejo (1892–1988): Fileuse, Op. 12
- Roger Penou: Air de danse
- Jacques Arnay: Fragment Lyrique, Op. 11.

Spanish writer Ramón del Valle-Inclán dedicated his poem ¡Del Celta es la Victoria! to Quiroga, and had copies handed out as nationalistic propaganda at a concert by Quiroga in A Coruña in 1918.

== Honours and legacy ==
The King of Spain appointed Manuel Quiroga a Commander of the Order of Alfonso X, the Wise (Encomienda de Alfonso X El Sabio).

On 24 September 1931, he was named a Chevalier de la Légion d'honneur by the French Government.

The Pontevedra Conservatory, founded in 1863, is now the "Conservatorio Profesional de Musica Manuel Quiroga". The street on which he was born, Calle del Comercio, has been renamed Calle Manuel Quiroga in his honour.

The people of A Coruña in Galicia erected a sculpture in his honour in 1950. There is also a memorial bust in Pontevedra, the work of the sculptor Francisco Asorey, and in the city square is a full-size statue of him shown playing the violin to a group of friends seated around him.

In his centenary year 1992, the City Museum of Pontevedra organized a series of commemorative events such as an exhibition of his paintings and drawings and some musical homages. These utilised some of his music manuscripts, paintings, drawings, caricatures, and other memorabilia, which Quiroga's family had donated to the museum in 1972. A compilation of some of his autograph scores was published by Música en Compostela, a musical institution based in Santiago de Compostela). His biography was published in 1993 by Fernando Otero Urtaza, and an article by Tully Potter in the special Iberian issue of The Strad in July 1998 traced his career.

Spanish string quartet, the Cuarteto Quiroga, was named in his honour. Since 2014 they have played on the Stradivari instruments in Madrid's Royal Palace.

== Compositions ==
=== Spanish dances ===
- Canto y danza Andaluza
- Jota nº 1
- Jota nº 2
- Lamento andaluz
- Playera y zapateado
- Rondalla
- Zapateado
- Zortzico

=== Cuban and Argentine dances ===
- 1ª Guajira
- 2ª Guajira
- 1ª Habanera
- 2ª Habanera
- 1ª Danza Argentina
- 2ª Danza Argentina

=== Hymns and songs to Galicia and Spain ===
- ¡España!
- Galicia
- Alalá
- Alborada
- Emigrantes celtas
- Muñeira

=== Concertos ===
- Premier Concierto en el Estilo Antiguo (Concerto Antico I) for violin and chamber orchestra. Also arranged for violin and piano.
- Segundo Concierto en el Estilo Antiguo, for violin and chamber orchestra (only a fragment preserved)

=== Other original compositions ===
- Canto Amoroso
- Viena
- Bruissement d’ailes
- Scherzando

=== Transcriptions ===
- Allegrissimo de Scarlatti
- Allegro de Scarlatti
- Andante cantabile de Mendelssohn

=== Études, caprices and variations for solo violin ===
- Estudio
- Tres caprichos
- Seis caprichos
- 9 Variations on Caprice No. 24 by Paganini
- 12 Variations on Caprice No. 24 by Paganini

=== Cadenzas ===
Quiroga wrote cadenzas for the following concertos:

- Beethoven: Violin Concerto in D major, Op. 61
- Brahms: Violin Concerto in D major, Op. 77
- Mozart: Violin Concerto No. 3 in G major, K. 216
- Mozart: Violin Concerto No. 4 in D major, K. 218
- Mozart: Violin Concerto No. 5 in A major, K. 219
- Mozart (spurious): Violin Concerto in E-flat major, K. 268 ("No. 6") (1780) (attributed to Johann Friedrich Eck)
- Mozart (spurious): Violin Concerto in D major, "Kolb", K. 271a ("No. 7") (1777)
- Paganini: Violin Concerto No. 1 in D major, Op. 6
- Paganini: Violin Concerto No. 2 in B minor, Op. 7
- Cadencia para una fantasía

A full catalogue of his compositions has been published. Another is available online.
