= Ysaÿe Quartet =

Ysaÿe Quartet is the name of two string quartets:

- Ysaÿe Quartet (1886), established by Eugène Ysaÿe
- Ysaÿe Quartet (1984), named after the original quartet
