= Six Sonatas for solo violin (Ysaÿe) =

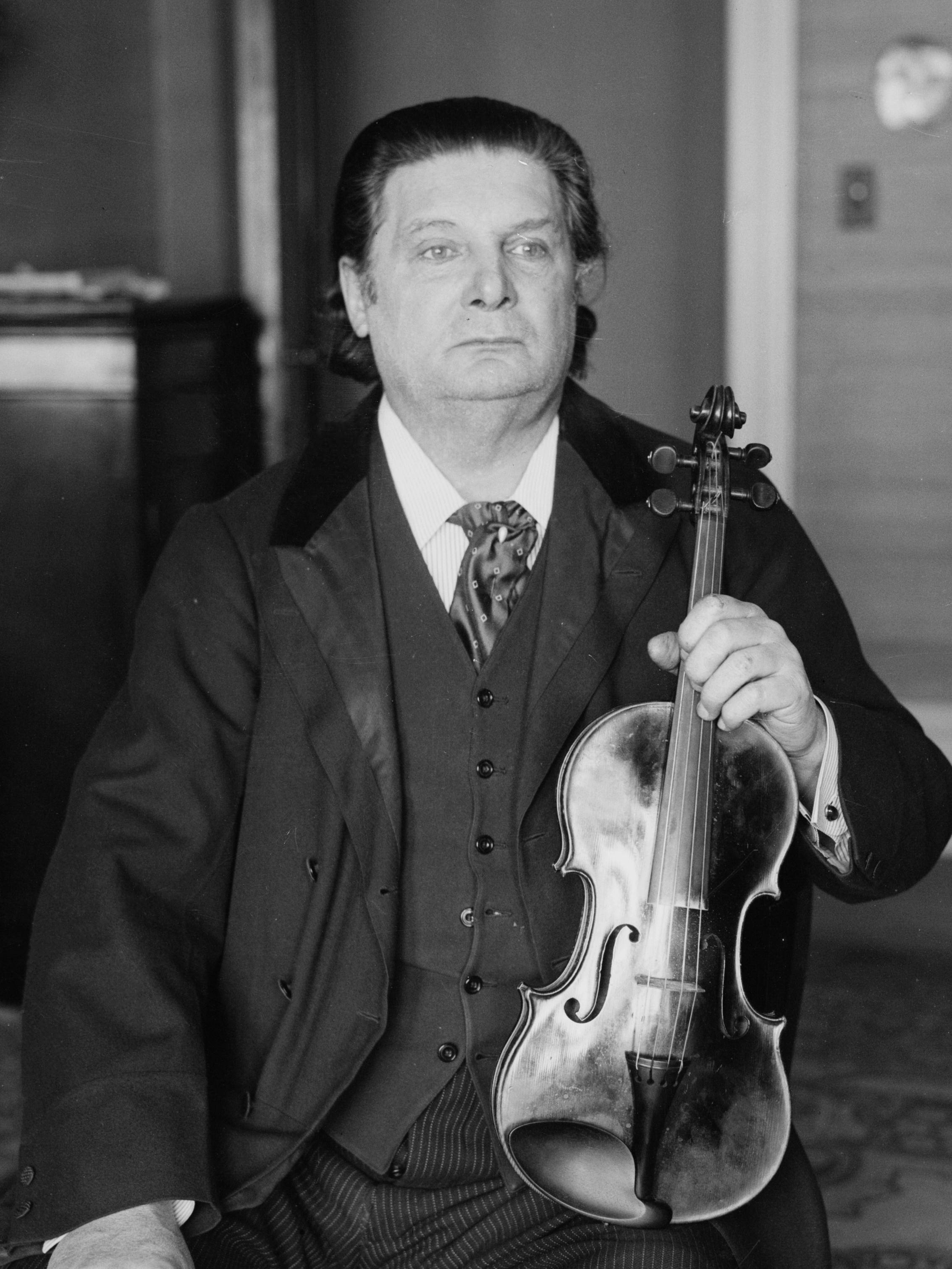
Eugène Ysaÿe, around 1915

Eugène Ysaÿe's set of Six Sonatas for solo violin, Op. 27, was written in July 1923. Each sonata was dedicated to one of Ysaÿe’s contemporary violinists: Joseph Szigeti (No. 1), Jacques Thibaud (No. 2), George Enescu (No. 3), Fritz Kreisler (No. 4), Mathieu Crickboom (No. 5), and Manuel Quiroga (No. 6).

== Background ==
After having heard Joseph Szigeti perform Johann Sebastian Bach's sonata for solo violin in G minor, Ysaÿe was inspired to compose violin works that represent the evolution of musical techniques and expressions of his time. As Ysaÿe claimed, "I have played everything from Bach to Debussy, for real art should be international."

In this set of sonatas, he used prominent characteristics of early 20th century music, such as whole tone scale, dissonances, and even microtonality. Ysaÿe also employed virtuoso bow and left hand techniques throughout, for he believed that "at the present day the tools of violin mastery, of expression, technique, mechanism, are far more necessary than in days gone by. In fact they are indispensable, if the spirit is to express itself without restraint." Thus, this set of sonatas places high technical demands on its performers. Yet Ysaÿe recurrently warns violinists that they should never forget to play instead of becoming preoccupied with technical elements; a violin master "must be a violinist, a thinker, a poet, a human being, he must have known hope, love, passion and despair, he must have run the gamut of the emotions in order to express them all in his playing."

== Sonatas ==
=== Sonata No. 1 in G minor ===
Sonata No. 1, in four movements, was dedicated to Joseph Szigeti. The movements are:

1. Grave
2. Fugato
3. Allegretto poco scherzoso
4. Finale; Con brio

=== Sonata No. 2 in A minor ===
Sonata No. 2, in four movements, was dedicated to Jacques Thibaud, a friend of Ysaÿe's. The movements are:

1. Obsession; Prelude (with quotes from Bach’s Prelude from his Solo Partita in E major)
2. Malinconia
3. Danse des Ombres; Sarabande
4. Les furies

=== Sonata No. 3 in D minor, "Ballade" ===
This sonata, dedicated to George Enescu is a single movement in two sections:

- Lento molto sostenuto
- Allegro in tempo giusto e con bravura

The first performance of this sonata was given by Josef Gingold.

=== Sonata No. 4 in E minor ===
The fourth sonata is dedicated to Fritz Kreisler. The movements are:

1. Allemande (Lento maestoso)
2. Sarabande (Quasi lento)
3. Finale (Presto ma non troppo)

=== Sonata No. 5 in G major ===
Mathieu Crickboom is the dedicatee of the fifth sonata in the set. The movements are:

1. L'Aurore
2. Danse rustique

=== Sonata No. 6 in E major ===
The final sonata is dedicated to Manuel Quiroga. The dedicatee never played this sonata in public. It is written in the style of a Spanish habanera, with a turbulent middle section, and notable for rich texture and chromaticism and scale passages.

There is one movement marked Allegro giusto non troppo vivo.

== Recordings ==
The complete "Six Sonatas" have been recorded by:

- Ruggiero Ricci (Vox-Candide, 1974)
- Gidon Kremer (Melodiya, 1976)
- Charles Castleman (Music & Arts, 1981)
- Oscar Shumsky (Nimbus, 1982)
- Rudolf Werthen (EMI, 1985 / reprint: Pavane Records, 1988)
- Lydia Mordkovitch (Chandos, 1988)
- Yuval Yaron (Accord, 1990)
- Evgenia-Maria Popova (Leman, 1991)
- Mateja Marinkovic (Collins, 1992)
- Vilmos Szabadi (Hungaroton, 1992)
- Stéphane Tran Ngoc (REM, 1994)
- Frank Peter Zimmermann (EMI, 1994)
- Tomoko Kato (Denon-Japan, 1995)
- Vincenzo Bolognese (P&P Classica, 1991 / reprint: Arts Music, 1997)
- Philippe Graffin (Hyperion, 1997)
- Takayoshi Wanami (Denon-Somm, 1997)
- Leonidas Kavakos (BIS, 1999)
- Laurent Korcia (Lyrinx, 2000)
- Ilya Kaler (Naxos, 2001)
- Jassen Todorov (Gega New, 2001)
- Benjamin Schmid (de) (Oehms Classics/Naxos, 2002)
- Hana Kotková (Forlane, 2002)
- Arisa Fujita (Intim Musik, 2004)
- Shunsuke Sato (Live Notes-Japan, 2004)
- Thomas Zehetmair (ECM, 2004)
- Marianne Piketty (Maguelone-France, 2006)
- Fanny Clamagirand (Nascor, 2007)
- Ray Iwazumi (Japan CD, 2008)
- Henning Kraggerud (Simax, 2008)
- Rachel Kolly d'Alba (Warner Classics, 2010)
- Wojciech Koprowski (Accord/Naxos, 2010)
- Judith Ingolfsson (Genuin, 2011)
- Wanchi Huang (Centaur, 2012)
- Tai Murray (Harmonia Mundi USA, 2012)
- Tedi Papavrami (Zig-Zag Territoires, 2012)
- [Olga Guy] (Arion Paris, 2012)
- Kristóf Baráti (Brilliant Classics, 2013)
- Žiga Brank (sl) (RTV Slovenia Klasika, 2013)
- Oleg Kaskiv (Claves, 2013)
- Tianwa Yang (Naxos, 2014)
- Alina Ibragimova (Hyperion, 2015)
- Jae-hong Yim (DUX, 2016)
- Ksenia Milas (ANIMA Records, Paris, 2017)
- Paolo Ghidoni (OnClassical, 2017)
- Sergey Malov (Solo Musica, 2017)
- Niklas Walentin (NAXOS, 2019)
- Kerson Leong (Alpha Classics, 2021)
- James Ehnes (Onyx Classics, 2021)
- Julia Fischer (Hänssler Classic, 2021)
- Hilary Hahn (Deutsche Grammophon, 2023)
- Sergey Khachatryan (naïve, 2024)
- Julia Fischer (Hänssler Classic, 2025)

Among other notable recordings, of separate Sonatas, are:

- Efrem Zimbalist (No. 1 - Victor, 1939)
- Ruggiero Ricci
  - No. 3 - live, One-Eleven, 1978, Etcetera, 1979
  - No. 4 - live Town Hall, One-Eleven, 1946
- David Oistrakh (No. 3 - Melodiya 1947; 1955 live; 1966)
- Michael Rabin (Nos. 3, 4 - EMI, 1956)
- Ion Voicu
  - No.3 - 1960s
  - No.5 - Decca, 1965
  - No.6 - Electrecord, 1965
- Aaron Rosand (Nos. 2, 6 - Audiofon, 1988)
- Maxim Vengerov
  - No. 3 - Biddulph, 1989
  - Nos. 2, 3, 4, 6 - EMI, 2002
- Leonidas Kavakos (No. 6 - Début Koch International, 1990)
- Ilya Gringolts (No. 3 - BIS, 2000)
- George Zacharias (No. 6 - Divine Art, 2009)
- Vadim Gluzman (No. 2 - BIS, 2012)
- Nancy Zhou (No. 4 - Orchid Classics, 2025)
- Alessandro Perpich (Farelive Atmosphere, 2022)

== Bibliography ==
- Hoaston, Karen D. Culmination of the Belgian Violin Tradition—The Innovative Style of Eugene Ysaÿe. 1999.
- Martens, Frederick H. Violin Mastery – Talks with Master Violinists and /teachers. New York: Frederick A. Stokes, Co.,1919.
- Ysaye, Antoine. Ysaye, by his son Antoine. England: W.E.Hill and Sons, 1980.
- Sleeve notes from CD Carlton Classics, Ysaye: Six Sonatas for Violin Solo, Ruggiero Ricci. Notes by Bill & Gill Newman.
- Barati, Kristof Ysaÿe: Sonatas for Solo Violin Brillian Classics, 2013
