= Eugène Bozza =

French composer and violinist

- Born: Eugène Joseph Bozza; 4 April 1905; Nice, France
- Died: 28 September 1991 (aged 86); Valenciennes, France
- Education: Paris Conservatorie, P. P., 1930
- Occupation: Composer
- Years active: 1920–1991
- Spouse(s): Juliette Arnaud (m. 1924–1952); Nelly Baude (m. 1954–1991)
- Children: Pierre Bozza, Cécile Bozza
- Website: Eugene Bozza Website

Eugène Joseph Bozza (4 April 1905 – 28 September 1991) was a French composer and violinist. He was one of the most prolific composers of chamber music for wind instruments. Bozza's large ensemble works include five symphonies, operas, ballets, large choral work, wind band music, concertos, and many works for large brass or woodwind ensembles. Outside of France, he is best known for his chamber music, rather than his larger works.

== Biography ==
=== Childhood and early years (1905–1915) ===
Bozza was born in Nice to an Italian musician and a French woman. His father, Umberto Bozza, was a violinist who made his living playing in French casinos along the Mediterranean coast. His mother's name was Honoré Molina. With a professional musician for a father, Bozza was exposed to music early on. He began studying the violin with his father when he was only five years old. Under such expert tutelage, Bozza became an outstanding young violinist and would occasionally go with his father to performances and play with the orchestra. In 1915, at the age of ten, Bozza and his father moved to Italy to avoid the turmoil of World War I.

=== Formative years (1915–1934) ===
In Italy, Bozza studied violin, piano, and solfège in Rome at the Accademia Nazionale di Santa Cecilia. He graduated in 1919 with a diploma as Professor of Violin. Bozza then returned to France and enrolled in the Conservatoire de Paris in 1922 where he studied violin with Édouard Nadaud. After two years of study, he earned the Conservatory's Premier Prix for violin and secured the chair of concert master at the Pasdeloup Orchestra in 1925. He married Juliette Arnaud, his first wife, in 1924 and had a son, Pierre, in 1925. After five years of touring Europe with the orchestra, Bozza resigned and returned to the Conservatory to study conducting with Henri Rabaud. His wife once confided that, "In fact, he was haunted by stage fright". Continuing his pattern of excellence, Bozza ended his study of conducting in 1931 by winning another Premier Prix, this time for conducting. Bozza was hired as the conductor for the Ballets Russes of Monte Carlo where he stayed for only a year before returning the Paris Conservatoire for a third and final time in 1932 to study musical composition. Following another two-year study with Henri Büsser, Bozza again won the Premier Prix for his area.

=== Middle years and career (1934–1950) ===
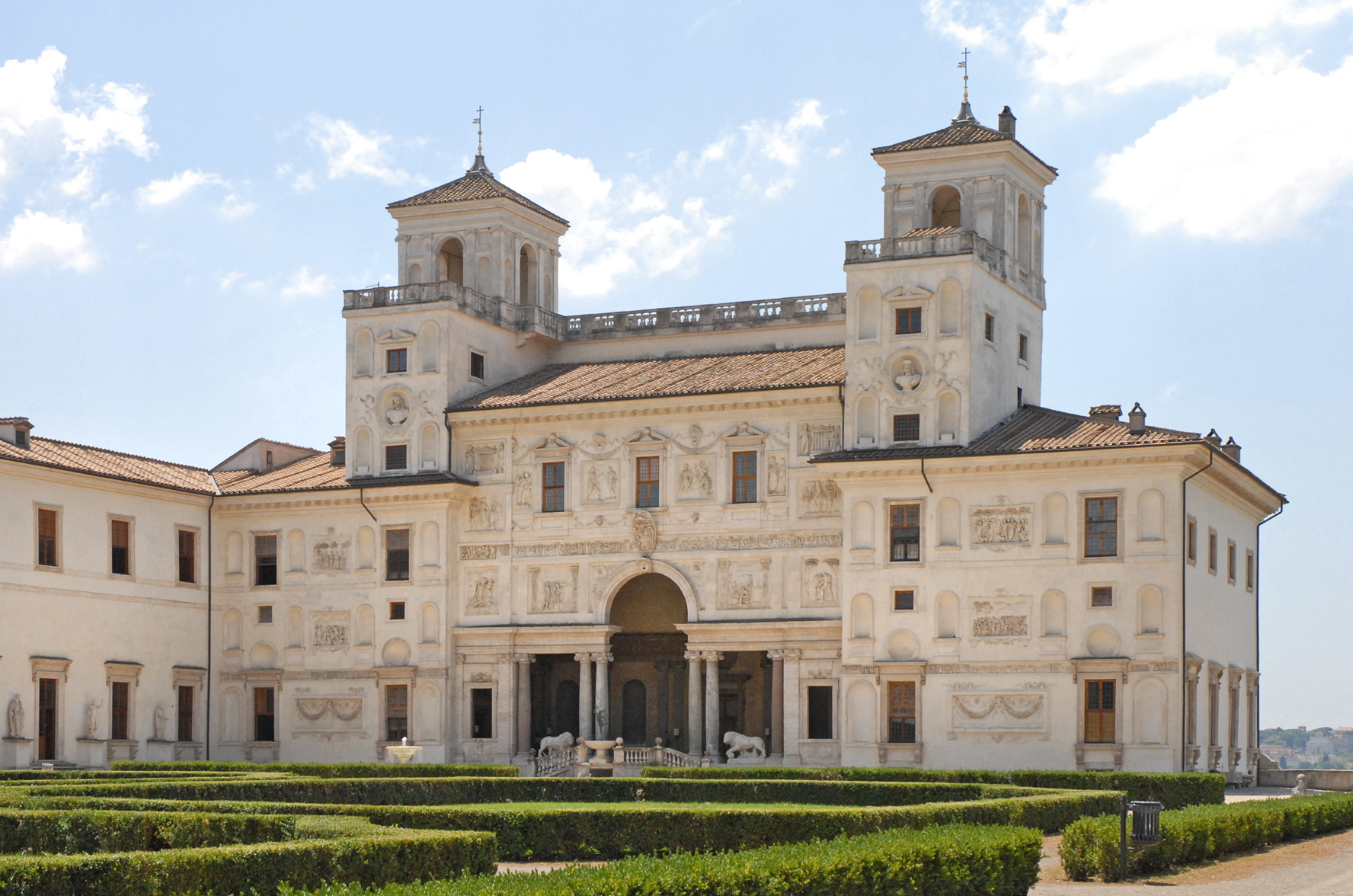
Villa Medici Roma

Bozza won the Prix de Rome in 1934 for his work La Légende de Roukmani, a one-act cantata. As part of the prize, he lived in Rome at the Villa de Medici for the following four years and five months so he could focus on growing as a composer, developing a voice, and honing his art. In Rome, Bozza composed several large-scale works such as his opera Leonidas, his Psalms, and the Introduzione and Toccata for piano and orchestra. He then returned to Paris after being appointed to conduct the Opéra-Comique from 1938 to 1948.

=== Academic career and later life (1950–1991) ===
In 1950, he was appointed the director of the École Nationale de Musique in Valenciennes and maintained the position until his retirement in 1975. The years spent at the École Nationale were extremely productive for Bozza. He composed many of his books of études and solo works during this time for students and staff at his school. Additionally, he was made a Chevalier of the Légion d’Honneur in 1956. He divorced Juliette Arnaud in the early 1950s. Also during this time he met his second wife, a pianist named Nelly Baude, and they had a daughter, Cécile, who went on to study at the Paris Conservatory and become a harp teacher in Denain. After retirement in 1975, Bozza stayed in Valenciennes and continued to write music. He fell ill late in life and died in Valenciennes aged 86.

== Compositions ==
See List of compositions by Eugène Bozza

Bozza was a prolific composer throughout his life. Beginning in the mid-1930s, he published at least one new work each year until just a few years before his death. Though a trained violinist, Bozza wrote an enormous amount of music for wind instruments during his life. Most of his wind music was composed and published during his time in Valenciennes. There are over 250 known published works as well as a wealth of manuscripts. During a posthumous assessment of the archives of Bozza's music over 70 unpublished manuscripts were found as well as several dozen that are no longer in print.

During his studies music in the inter-war period, the musical styles in Paris were moving away from Romanticism and Impressionism and towards the ideas of wit and eclecticism as laid out in Jean Cocteau's 1918 manifesto Le Coq et l’Arlequin. Cocteau said, "We have had enough clouds, waves, aquaria, watersprites, and nocturnal perfumes". These ideals of music being sharp, cutting, and always new are present in nearly all of Bozza's music. Additionally, Bozza's works are widely known to be very sensitive to the techniques of the instrument(s) for which they are written. His style shows many traditions of the French Impressionist school mixed with the fundamental mastery of harmony of Bach. His compositions can be placed within the Neo-Classicist genre which is also populated by Darius Milhaud and Igor Stravinsky.

Another major influence on his compositional style was the result of the cultural infusion, which occurred during and following World War I. Over two million American soldiers were sent to Europe which included roughly 10% African American soldiers. The influx of American and African American soldiers brought new styles and attitudes about music which were assimilated in French culture. This style of music quickly became part of French popular music and Bozza was introduced to it at an early age. Elements of jazz style and harmony are present in many of his works.

Another significant element of Bozza's output was educational methods and étude books. During his tenure as director in Valenciennes, Bozza composed at least 18 étude collections for many instruments including violin, double bass, flute, oboe, clarinet, bassoon, saxophone, trumpet, horn, and trombone. This compositional history lends itself as a partial explanation to the popularity of Bozza's music in academic institutions.

=== Important works ===
An unaccompanied work for solo flute, Image is a substantial piece that showcases many elements of flute technique including extreme registral and timbral changes and flutter tongue.

En Forêt for solo horn and piano

The Concerto for Clarinet and Chamber Orchestra is a three-movement work and one of 19 concertos written by Bozza.

Bozza created a wide repertoire of music for Bassoon. Récit, Sicilienne et Rondo is a solo piece with piano accompaniment that explores both the high and low range of the bassoon. Due to its technical demands and lyrical melodies, this piece is a mainstay of the conservatory repertoire for bassoon.

Aria, a piece written for alto saxophone and piano, draws inspiration from the works of J. S. Bach, especially the Manual for the Fantasy in F and the Pastorale in F Major (BWV 590). It is one of his most frequently played works for saxophone and is also available in an edition for clarinet. The piece was written during Bozza's stay in Rome at the Villa de Medici for French saxophonist Marcel Mule. Some of the lore around this piece says that it was written very quickly after Bozza was questioned about how much he had accomplished in the first few months in Rome.

Nuages for saxophone quartet is indicative of the Impressionistic side of Bozza. This scherzo focuses on the image of clouds and showcases masterful technique on the saxophone. Written in 1946, this piece comes from his time as the director of the Paris Opéra Comique and had the best instrumentalists available to him.

In his horn solo, En forêt, the Impressionistic technique of planing can be seen in the piano part combined with a solo part that is masterfully written for the instrument. Bozza also reminds us of the horn's roots as hunting horns with frequent calls and responses. This piece is one of the mainstays of the solo horn repertoire.

New Orleans for bass trombone and piano is a solo work written in 1962 for bass saxhorn. Since that instrument has fallen to obscurity, this solo is now frequently played on bass trombone or tuba. Influenced heavily by the jazz culture of New Orleans, this piece explores many styles that might be heard walking around the city such as ragtime and dixieland. This piece is a major element of the bass trombone solo repertoire and is often called upon for auditions.

Bozza's Concertino for Tuba and Orchestra represents a significant addition to the major solo repertoire for the Tuba.

== Reception ==
He spent much of his life in the central and northern large population centers of Paris and Valenciennes, so many of Bozza's stage works were premiered in Lille, located in north of France too. His work transcended the metropolitan mentality and he felt the music would be well served in this more pastoral area. His large works—such as symphonies, concertos, and operas—are largely unknown outside of central Europe, but his solo and chamber works are fixtures in music schools throughout the world.

Bozza's music has largely been a critical and popular success. His style was normally highly accessible to listeners, students, and academics; and he composed such a mass of solo and chamber music that his name is commonly heard in studios. Norman Heim, professor of clarinet at the University of Maryland, may have encapsulated the success of Bozza's work with this:

"He is a performer's composer, in that the music is well written for the instrument, is challenging to play and enjoyable to rehearse. He is the listener's composer since the music is always interesting, and has a familiarity of melody and tonality that even the untrained ear can enjoy."

A testament to the universality of his music is that when Bozza died at midnight on 28 September 1991, his woodwind quintet Scherzo was being played on Belgian Radio at the request of a listener.

Bozza remains frequently played and recorded today (Naxos Music Library lists 126 albums with recordings of his works and a YouTube search for Bozza yields thousands of videos). However, for whatever reason, very little has been written about his life, especially the earlier years. Reference works such as the Grove Music Dictionary have very short entries or sometimes no entries at all. Most modern writing about his past cites a single dissertation, published in 1978, by Denise Rogers Rowen about his bassoon music.

== Awards and honors ==
=== Premiers Prix du Conservatoire de Paris ===
- 1924: Premier Prix diploma for violin
- 1930: Premier Prix diploma for conducting
- 1934: Premier Prix diploma for composition

=== Other awards ===
- 1934: Grand Prix de Rome for composition

=== Honours ===
- 1956: Chevalier de la Lègion d'Honneur
- Officer des Palmes Academiques
- Chevalier de la Couronne de Belgique
- Officer du Mérite Nationale
- Chevalier de la Couronne de Italie
- Chevalier de l'Ordre des Arts et des Letters
- Officer de l'Ordre du Nichaire-Iftukhar
- Médaille d'Argent de la Ville de Paris
- Grand Croix du Mèrit Musical
- Médaille de Vermeil Arts-Sciences-Lettres
- Médaille de la Ville de Valenciennes

== Further reading and listening ==
=== Bibliography ===
- Campbell, Carey Lynn. "A Study of Three Works Performed on a Graduate Horn Recital." Thesis, University of Texas at El Paso, 2001.
- Chung, Ke-Hsing Kaye. "Solos de Concours for Flute at the Paris Conservatory: Two Decades-1900s and 1940s." PhD diss., University of Maryland, 2004.
- Cross, John David. "Mass Without Words: Eugene Bozza's Messe solennelle de Sainte Cecile for Brass, Organ, Timpani and Harp." PhD diss., California State University, Long Beach, 2011.
- Dovel, Jason. "The Influence of Jazz on the Solo Trumpet Compositions of Eugène Bozza." PhD diss., University of North Texas, 2007.
- Entzi, John. "The Trumpet Solos of Eugène Bozza." PhD diss., University of South Carolina, 1998.
- Faas, Jason. "A Study of Compositional Technique and Influence in Three Bass Trombone Pieces by Eug̀ene Bozza." PhD diss., University of Nebraska-Lincoln, 2007.
- Hale, Ted. "The Influence of Selected Stylistic Elements of Jazz on Seven 20th-Century Solo Trombone Pieces." PhD. diss., Indiana University, 1996.
- Jackson, Robert Milton. "Analysis of Selected Trombone Methods Developed at the Paris Conservatory of Music." Thesis, North Texas State University, 1971.
- Kuyper-Rushing, Lois. "A Thematic Index of the works for woodwinds by Eugène Bozza." PhD diss., Louisiana State University, 1989.
- Locke, Scott. "The Accompanied Clarinet Works of Eugène Bozza: Descriptive Analysis and Performance Guide with Emphasis on the Clarinet Concerto." PhD diss., Ball State University, 1996.
- McCullough, David Meadows. "Performance and Stylistic Aspects of Horn Quartets by Hindemith, Tippett, Bozza, Heiden, and Reynolds." PhD diss., University of Georgia, 1990.
- Mohen, Girard Stephen. "A Study, Analysis and Performance of Four Twentieth Century Compositions for Saxophone Quartet." PhD. diss., Columbia University, 1982.
- Ornelas, Raul Sosa. "A Comprehensive Performance Project in Trumpet Repertoire: An Essay on Eugène Bozza's Published Compositions for Solo Trumpet with Piano or Orchestra and an Analysis of Representative Compositions." PhD diss., University of Southern Mississippi, 1986.
- Rowan, Denise Cecile Rogers. "The Contributions for Bassoon with Piano Accompaniment and Orchestral Accompaniment of Eugène Bozza with Analyses of Representative Solo Compositions." PhD diss., University of Southern Mississippi, 1978.
- Sestrick, Timothy. "Hans Werner Henze and Eugène Bozza: An Examination of Two Works for Percussion." Thesis, Indiana University of Pennsylvania, 2003.
- Vogt, Nancy Elizabeth. "A Performance Edition of Trois pièces pour Quatuor de Trombones by Eugène Bozza." PhD diss., University of Nebraska-Lincoln, 2006.
- Watkins Ink, Hannah Elizabeth. "The French Three: a Comparison (performed) of Recital Music by Darius Milhaud, Henri Tomasi, and Eugène Bozza." PhD diss., University of Maryland, College Park, 2005.
