= Rosario Bourdon =

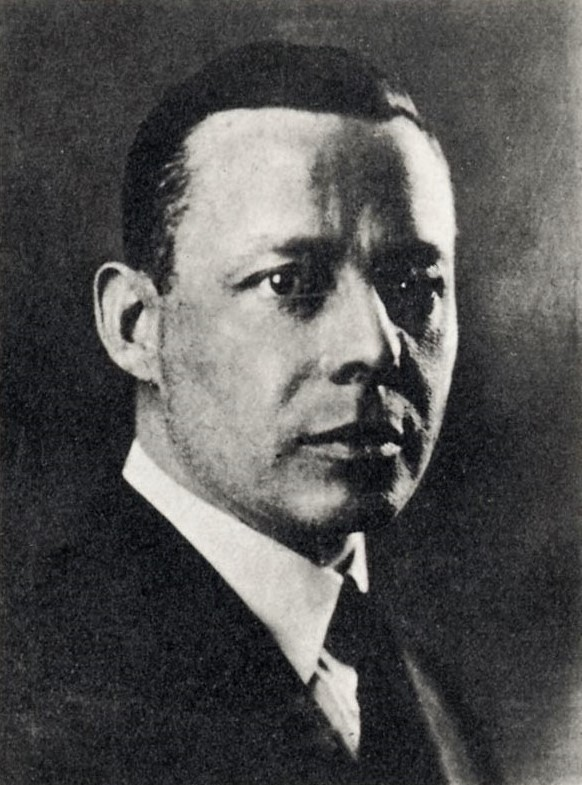
Rosario Bourdon, circa October 1923

Joseph Charles Rosario Bourdon (March 6, 1885 – April 24, 1961) was a French Canadian cellist, violinist, conductor, arranger and composer. He was a child prodigy skilled with many musical instruments. Bourdon worked much of his life for the Victor Talking Machine Company where he exerted considerable influence.

== Childhood ==
Bourdon was born in Longueuil, Quebec into a family with musical talents. His father was an amateur singer. Louis-Honoré Bourdon, his half-brother was a renowned impresario. Caroline Derome, his mother, began Bourdon's musical instruction with the cello when he was seven. She would later marry Jean-Baptiste Dubois, a professional cellist who would further instruct Bourdon in the instrument. Around this same time Bourdon learned to play the piano.

In 1897, Bourdon was invited to attend the Ghent Conservatory in Belgium. There he continued his training on the cello under Joseph Jacob. He did well, winning a "first prize with great distinction" in a school competition after spending only eight months there. He was touring Europe shortly thereafter. In 1899 he returned to Canada to tour, and was received well in Montreal and Quebec City.

== Career ==
Bourdon moved to the United States seeking better career opportunities than he could find in Canada. From 1902 until 1904 he played with the Cincinnati Symphony Orchestra. He travelled back to Quebec during the summer of 1903 to perform Le Désir with the Quebec Symphony Orchestra on the opening of the Auditorium de Québec on August 31, 1903. In 1904 he moved to Philadelphia where he played with the Philadelphia Orchestra. In 1905 he made his first recording for the Victor Talking Machine Company. In 1908 he moved, this time to Saint Paul, Minnesota. In 1909, the Victor Company hired Bourdon as the "in-house" cellist, and he performed number of different tasks during his career with the company. He performed on piano and cello as an accompanist for Victor artists. He served as a conductor for the Victor Concert Orchestra, the Victor Symphony Orchestra, and occasionally the Victor Salon Orchestra and Sousa's Band. Thousands of Victor recordings for which Bourdon was the conductor or an instrumentalist are documented on the EDVR (Encyclopedic Discography of Victor Recordings). In 1920, he was promoted to musical co-director at Victor, a position he shared with Josef Pasternack. In 1922, he became a naturalized citizen of the United States.

Bourdon left RCA Victor in 1931. He worked in a number of jobs in the music industry during his post-Victor career. He directed musical scores for films by Laurel and Hardy and Mickey Mouse cartoons by Walt Disney. From 1927 until 1938 he directed Cities Service Concerts on NBC radio. The program had been on the air for only half a year before Bourdon took over directing; it went on another 11 seasons and was very successful. He worked as a musical director at Muzak, Brunswick Records, and the Thesaurus radio transcription service. Bourdon was hired to conduct the newly formed Montreal Symphony Orchestra, which gave their first concert on January 14, 1935, at Plateau Hall. He retained that position for many years. In 1944, he was awarded an honorary doctorate in music by the Université de Montréal. In 1936 and 1938, he conducted the Naumburg Orchestral Concerts, in the Naumburg Bandshell, Central Park, in the summer series.

Bourdon died in New York City on April 24, 1961.
