= List of compositions by Eugène Bozza =

The following is a list of compositions by Eugène Bozza.

== Orchestral ==
=== Ballet ===
- Fêtes romaines (1939)
- Jeux de plage (1945); in 1 act

=== Orchestra ===
- Scherzo (1943)
- Variation libres et finale (1943)
- Rapsodie niçoise (1944)
- Pax triumphans, Symphonic Poem, Op. 63 (1945)
- Sinfonietta for string orchestra, Op. 61 (1946)
- Prélude et passacaille (1947)
- Symphonie (1948)
- Children's Overture (1964)
- Symphonie mimée
- Mallorca
- Suite pour un vaudeville, musique de scene pour la Station de Champbaudet
- Danse de la terre
- Voyages, Suite for orchestra and piano
- Mikrophonie for 17 soloists
- Figures sonores for 9 instruments
- Hommage à Rossini
- Marche des moissonneurs
- Cinq mouvements for string orchestra (1970)
- Symphony No. 1
- Symphony No. 2
- Symphony No. 3
- Symphony No. 4
- Symphony No. 5

=== Concertante ===
- Concertino for viola and orchestra (1932)
- Concerto for violin and orchestra (1936)
- Concerto for saxophone and orchestra (1937)
- Introduzione et toccata for piano and orchestra (1938)
- Concertino for alto saxophone and orchestra (1939)
- Prélude et invention for chamber orchestra with piano obligato, Op. 24 (1939)
- Ballade for tenor trombone and orchestra, Op. 62 (1944)
- Concertino for bassoon and chamber orchestra, Op. 49 (1946)
- Concerto for cello and orchestra, Op. 57 (1948)
- Concertino for trumpet and chamber orchestra (1949)
- Concerto for clarinet and chamber orchestra (1952)
- Concertino for piano and winds (1955)
- Concerto for violin, viola, cello, winds, harp and double bass (1955)
- Concertino da camera for flute and string orchestra (or piano) (1964)
- Sicilienne et rondo for piano and orchestra (1965)
- Concertino for tuba (or bass saxhorn) and orchestra (1967)
- Atmosphères for 4 flutes and chamber orchestra (1978)
- Rapsodie niçoise for violin and orchestra
- Divertissement for violin solo, winds, celesta and harp (1989)

=== Wind band ===
- Fanfare héroïque for 3 trumpets, 4 horns, 3 trombones, tuba, timpani, drums and cymbals, Op. 46 (1944)
- Ouverture pour une cérémonie for brass and percussion (1963)
- Ouverture rythmique (1963)
- Messe solennelle de Sainte Cécile for brass, timpani, organ and harp (ad libitum) (1968)
- Marche solennelle des X. jeux olympiques d'hiver
- ...des enfants de Valenciennes
- Pax triumphans (transcription for band)

== Vocal ==
=== Opera ===
- Léonidas (1947, revised 1974); in 3 acts, 4 scenes; libretto by Guy de Téramond
- Beppo: ou Le mort dont personne ne voulait (1963); opera buffa in 1 act; libretto by José Bruyr
- La duchesse de Langeais (1967); in 4 acts; libretto by Félix Forte after the novel by Honoré de Balzac

=== Oratorio ===
- Tentation de Saint Antoine (1948)
- Passion de Jesus (1963)
- Le chant de la mine

=== Cantata ===
- La légende de Roukmāni (1934)
- Psaumes for chorus, orchestra and organ (1938)
- Cantate du centenaire

=== Choral ===
- L'étoile du soir, Chorus for 3 female voices and piano (1946)
- Requiem for soprano, tenor and baritone (1950)
- Messe de sa Sainte té Pie XII for soprano, alto, tenor, and baritone (1955)
- Messe de requiem for chorus and orchestra (1971)
- Messe à trois voix a capella
- Hymne for soprano, mezzo-soprano, tenor, baritone and piano or orchestra
- Sur le chemin du moulin for 4 voices and piano

=== Voice and piano ===
- 5 Chansons Niçoises for voice and piano, Op. 43 (1942)
- 5 Chansons florentines for high voice and piano (1946)
- Colloque séntimental
- Vocalise for voice and piano

== Piano ==
- Pulcinella, Op. 53 (1946)
- Toccata (1956)
- Deux pièces faciles (1962)
- Sonate for 2 pianos (1963)
- Allegro de concert (1974)
- Esquisse (1979)
- Promenade dans le parc (1979)

== Chamber music ==
=== Violin ===
- Nocturne sur le lac du Bourget for violin and piano, Op. 34 (1923)
- 10 Pièces faciles à la première position for violin and piano (1935)
- Habañera for violin (or cello) and piano (1935)
- Sérénade espagnole for violin (or cello) and piano (1935)
- Aria for alto saxophone (or flute, or clarinet, or violin, or cello) and piano (1936)

=== Viola ===
- Parthie for viola solo (1967)
- Improvisation burlesque for viola and piano (1968)

=== Cello ===
- Habañera for violin (or cello) and piano (1935)
- Sérénade espagnole for violin (or cello) and piano (1935)
- Aria for alto saxophone (or flute, or clarinet, or violin, or cello) and piano (1936)
- Orphéus for cello solo (published 1993)

=== Double bass ===
- Allegro et finale for double bass (or tuba, or bass saxhorn, or bass trombone) and piano (1953)
- Prélude et allegro for double bass (or tuba, or bass saxhorn, or bass trombone) and piano (1953)
- Pièce sur le nom d'Édouard Nanny for double bass and piano (1956)
- 8 Études for double bass (1976)

=== Harp ===
- Improvisation sur le nom de Marcel Tournier (1979)
- Rondino et menuet (1991)

=== Guitar ===
- Concertino for guitar and string quartet (1969)
- Deux impressions Andalouses for guitar (1969)
- Trois préludes for guitar (1970)

=== Flute ===
- Aria for alto saxophone (or flute, or clarinet, or violin, or cello) and piano (1936)
- Fantaisie italienne for clarinet (or flute, or oboe) and piano (1939)
- Image for flute solo, Op. 38 (1939)
- Agrestide for flute and piano, Op. 44 (1942)
- Soir dans les montagnes for flute and piano (1946)
- Trois cadences pour le concerto en sol pour flûte de Mozart (1949)
- Air pastoral for flute (or oboe) and piano (1953)
- Jour d'été à la montagne for flute quartet (1953)
- Ronde for flute quartet (1953)
- Trois impressions for flute and piano (1953)
- 14 Études-arabesques for flute (1960)
- Deux impressions for flute and harp (1967)
- Deux esquisses for flute quartet (1972)
- Dialogue for flute and piano (1972)
- 10 Études sur des modes karnatiques (10 Studies in Karnatic Modes) for flute (1972)
- Air de vielle for flute (or oboe) and piano (1976)
- Berceuse for flute (or oboe) and piano (1976)
- Quatre pièces faciles for flute and piano (1976)
- Cinq chansons sur des thèmes japonais for flute and piano (1978)
- Interlude for recorder (soprano / alto) solo, or flute solo (1978)
- Phorbéia for flute solo (1978)
- Trois pièces for flute quartet (1979)
- 3 Évocations for 2 flutes (1988)
- Le chant de forêts
- Aux bonds du torrent
- Pastorale

=== Recorder ===
- Interlude for recorder (soprano / alto) solo, or flute solo (1978)

=== Oboe / English horn ===
- Divertissement for English horn (or alto saxophone) and piano, Op. 39 (1939)
- Fantaisie italienne for clarinet (or flute, or oboe) and piano (1939)
- Fantaisie pastorale for oboe and piano, Op. 37 (1939)
- 18 Études for oboe (1950)
- Air pastoral for oboe (or flute) and piano (1953)
- Conte pastorale for oboe and piano (1953)
- Lied for English horn and piano (1954)
- Sonate for oboe and piano (1971)
- Suite monodique for oboe solo (1971)
- 14 Études sur des modes karnatiques (14 Studies in Karnatic Modes) for oboe solo (1972)
- Air de vielle for oboe (or flute) and piano (1976)
- Berceuse for oboe (or flute) and piano (1976)
- Pastorale for oboe and piano (1979)

=== Clarinet / bass clarinet ===
- Aria for alto saxophone (or flute, or clarinet, or violin, or cello) and piano (1936)
- Ballade for bass clarinet and piano (1939)
- Fantaisie italienne for clarinet (or flute, or oboe) and piano (1939)
- Pulcinella for clarinet (or alto saxophone) and piano (1944)
- 14 Études de mecanisme for clarinet (1948)
- Bucolique for clarinet and piano (1949)
- Claribel for clarinet and piano (1952)
- 12 Études for clarinet (1953)
- Idylle for clarinet and piano (1959)
- Prélude et divertissement for clarinet (or alto saxophone) and piano (1960)
- Caprice-improvisation for clarinet and piano (1963)
- Lucioles for 6 clarinets (1963)
- Divertissement for clarinet and piano, Op. 39 (1964)
- Épithalame for clarinet and piano (1971)
- Sonatine for clarinet quartet (1971); also for flute, oboe, clarinet and bassoon
- 11 Études sur des modes karnatiques (11 Studies in Karnatic Modes) for clarinet (1972)
- Suite for clarinet and piano (1973)
- Rapsodie niçoise for clarinet and piano (1977)

=== Bassoon ===
- Récit, sicilienne et rondo for bassoon and piano (1936)
- Fantaisie for bassoon and piano (1945)
- 15 Études journalières for bassoon (1945)
- Divertissement for 3 bassoons (1954)
- Duettino for 2 bassoons (1954)
- Burlesque for bassoon and piano (1957)
- Espièglerie for bassoon and piano (1960)
- Prélude et divertissement for bassoon and piano (1960)
- Nocturne-danse for bassoon (or alto saxophone) and piano (1967)
- 12 Caprices for bassoon solo (1968)
- Pièces brèves for bassoon solo (1968)
- 11 Études sur des modes karnatiques (11 Studies in Karnatic Modes) for bassoon (1972)
- Shiva for bassoon and piano (1974)
- Cadenza for bassoon and piano

=== Saxophone ===
- Aria for alto saxophone (or flute, or clarinet, or violin, or cello) and piano (1936)
- Andante et Scherzo for saxophone quartet (1938)
- Divertissement for alto saxophone (or English horn) and piano, Op. 39 (1939)
- Pulcinella for alto saxophone (or clarinet) and piano, Op. 53 No. 1 (1944)
- Scaramouche for alto saxophone and piano, Op. 53 No. 2 (1944)
- 12 Études-caprices for saxophone, Op. 60 (1944)
- Nuages, Scherzo for saxophone quartet (1946)
- Improvisation et caprice for saxophone solo (1952)
- Impromptu et danse for alto saxophone (or baritone saxophone) and piano (1954)
- Pièce brève for alto saxophone solo (1955)
- Prélude et divertissement for alto saxophone (or clarinet) and piano (1960)
- Chanson à bercer for alto saxophone and piano (1964)
- Gavotte des demoiselles for alto saxophone and piano (1964)
- La campanile for alto saxophone and piano (1964)
- Menuet des pages for alto saxophone and piano (1964)
- Parade des petits soldats for alto saxophone and piano (1964)
- Petite gavotte for alto saxophone and piano (1964)
- Rêves d'enfant for alto saxophone and piano (1964)
- Nocturne-danse for alto saxophone (or bassoon) and piano (1967)
- Tarentelle for alto saxophone and piano (1968)
- Diptyque for alto saxophone and piano (1970)
- Pièce concertante for tenor saxophone and piano

=== Horn ===
- En forêt for horn and piano (or orchestra), Op. 40 (1941)
- En Irlande for horn and piano (1951)
- Suite for horn quartet (1952)
- Chant lointain for horn and piano (1957)
- Sur les cimes for horn and piano (1960)
- 18 Études en forme d'improvisation for horn (1961)
- Entretiens for horn and piano (1974)

=== Trumpet / cornet ===
- Caprice No. 1 for trumpet and piano, Op. 47 (1943)
- Badinage for trumpet and piano (1950)
- 16 Études for trumpet, bugle, or cornet (1950)
- Dialogue for 2 trumpets (1954)
- Rustiques for cornet or trumpet and piano (1955)
- Rapsodie for trumpet and piano (1957)
- Cornettina for cornet or trumpet and piano (1965)
- Frigariana for trumpet and piano (1967)
- 11 Études sur des modes karnatiques (11 Studies in Karnatic Modes) for trumpet (1972)
- Lied for trumpet and piano (1976)
- Caprice No. 2 for trumpet and piano (1978)

=== Trombone ===
- Ballade for trombone and piano (1944)
- Allegro et finale for bass trombone (or double bass, or tuba, or bass saxhorn) and piano (1953)
- Prélude et allegro for bass trombone (or double bass, or tuba, or bass saxhorn) and piano (1953)
- 13 Études-caprices for trombone (1956)
- Hommage à Bach for trombone and piano (1957)
- Thème varié for bass trombone (or tuba, or bass saxhorn) and piano (1957)
- New Orleans for bass trombone (or tuba, or bass saxhorn) and piano (1962)
- 3 Pièces for trombone quartet (tuba ad libitum) (1964)
- Ciaccona for trombone and piano (1967)
- 11 Études sur des modes karnatiques (11 Studies in Karnatic Modes) for trombone (1972)

=== Bass saxhorn ===
- Allegro et finale for bass saxhorn (or double bass, or tuba, or bass trombone) and piano (1953)
- Prélude et allegro for bass saxhorn (or double bass, or tuba, or bass trombone) and piano (1953)
- Thème varié for bass saxhorn (or tuba, or bass trombone) and piano (1957)
- New Orleans for bass saxhorn (or tuba, or bass trombone) and piano (1962)

=== Tuba ===
- Allegro et finale for tuba (or double bass, or bass saxhorn, or bass trombone) and piano (1953)
- Prélude et allegro for tuba (or double bass, or bass saxhorn, or bass trombone) and piano (1953)
- Thème varié for tuba (or bass saxhorn, or bass trombone) and piano (1957)
- New Orleans for tuba (or bass saxhorn, or bass trombone) and piano (1962)

=== Percussion ===
- Rythmic for timpani, percussion and piano, Op. 70 (1948)
- Rhapsodie sur des airs japonais for timpani, xylophone, vibraphone, percussion and piano (1978)
- Vanaspati for 12 percussionists and xylophone ad libitum (1979)
- Rag Music for timpani, glockenspiel, xylophone, marimba, vibraphone, percussion and piano (1981)
- Trois esquisses japonaises for percussion

=== Duos ===
- Sonatine for flute and bassoon (1938)
- Ricercare for violin and cello (1959)
- Polydiaphonie for flute and guitar (1972)
- Quatre esquisses for trumpet and trombone (1974)
- Trois mouvements for flute and clarinet (1974)
- Berceuse et sérénade for flute and guitar (1976)
- Sonatine for viola and cello (1976)
- Contrastes I for flute and bassoon (1977)
- Contrastes II for oboe and bassoon (1977)
- Contrastes III for clarinet and bassoon (1977)
- Contrastes IV for trumpet and horn (1977)
- Trois essais for trombone and percussion (1977)
- Trois pièces for flute and guitar (1977)
- Trois pièces for flute and oboe (or flute) (published 1990)

=== Trios ===
- Fughette, sicilienne, rigaudon for oboe, clarinet and bassoon (1934)
- Suite brève en trio for oboe, clarinet and bassoon (1947)
- Sérénade en trio for flute, clarinet and bassoon (1971)

=== Quartets ===
- Quatuor en la for string quartet (1946)
- 3 Pièces pour une musique de nuit for flute, oboe, clarinet and bassoon (1954)
- Trois pièces for 4 trombones (bass trombone or tuba ad libitum) (1964)
- Sérénade pour quatuor à vent for flute, oboe, clarinet and bassoon (1969)
- Sonatine pour quatuor à vent for flute, oboe, clarinet and bassoon (1971)
- Trois pièces pour quatuor de cuivres for 2 trumpets, horn and trombone (1977)

=== Quintets ===
- Variations sur un thème libre for woodwind quintet, Op. 42 (1943)
- Scherzo for woodwind quintet, Op. 48 (1944)
- Sonatine for brass quintet (1951)
- Bis for brass quintet (1963)
- Giration for brass quintet (1967)
- Suite française for brass quintet (1967)
- Suite [No. 2] for brass quintet (1967)
- Pentaphonie for woodwind quintet (1969)
- Trilogie for brass quintet (1969)
- Trois mouvements for 2 trumpets (or cornets), horn, trombone and tuba (1979)
- Quand les muses collaborent for woodwind quintet

=== Larger ensembles ===
- Symphonie da camera for 2 oboes, 2 clarinets, 2 bassoons and 2 horns (1960)
- Quatre mouvements pour septuor à vent for flute, oboe, clarinet, bassoon, horn, trumpet and trombone (1970)
- Octanphonie for 2 oboes, 2 clarinets, 2 horns and 2 bassoons (1972)
- Prélude et chaconne for 3 trumpets, 4 horns, 3 trombones, tuba, timpani, bass drum and gong (1976)
- Trois pièces pour septuor de cuivres for 2 trumpets, horn, 3 trombones and tuba (1985)
- Cappricio sur le nom de Claude Delvincourt for 12 wind instruments
- Symphonie de chambre for flute, oboe, clarinet, bassoon, horn, harp, celesta and piano
