= Joseph Jacob (cellist) =

Belgian cellist

Joseph Jacob (Liège 1865 – Brussels 25 October 1909) was a Belgian cellist who taught at the Ghent Conservatory and played in the Ysaÿe Quartet from 1886.

Jacob's students included Rosario Bourdon.

As a member of the Ysaÿe Quartet, he premiered Claude Debussy's String Quartet on December 29, 1893.
