= Piano Quintet No. 1 (Fauré) =

Piano quintet by Gabriel Fauré

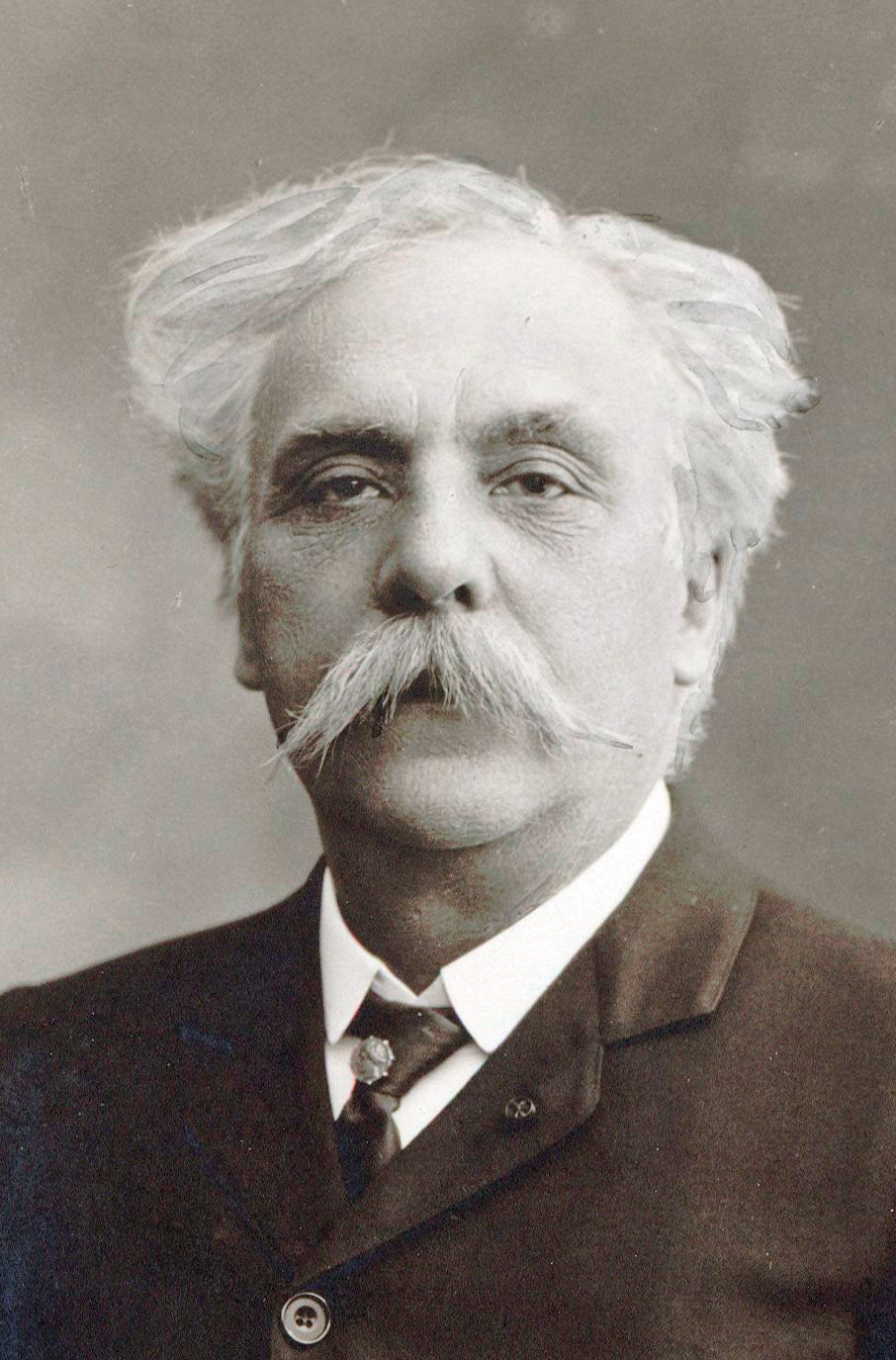
Fauré in 1905

Gabriel Fauré's Piano Quintet No. 1 in D minor, Op. 89 is the first of his two works in the genre. Dedicated to Eugène Ysaÿe, the quintet was given its premiere in Brussels by the Quatuor Ysaÿe, with the composer at the piano, on 23 March 1906. The gestation of the work was long and effortful: Fauré started work on it in 1887 and repeatedly set it aside and returned to it until he completed it in 1905.

== Background ==
In 1887, shortly after the premiere of his Second Piano Quartet, Fauré told a friend that he found himself "haunted by an idea for another work for piano and strings". He rarely kept sketches for his works once they were complete, but a sketchbook dating from mid-1887 survives, containing the theme that was to form the work's finale. Fauré's biographer Jean-Michel Nectoux speculates that the idea of incorporating the theme into a piano quintet may have been prompted by the friendship between the composer and the violinist Eugène Ysaÿe, with whom he gave concerts in 1888 and 1889, and to whom the quintet is dedicated.

In late 1890, Fauré sketched out most of the quintet, but was unsatisfied with it, and laid it aside in favour of two song cycles – the Cinq mélodies "de Venise" (1891) and La Bonne chanson (1892–1894). He returned to it in 1894, but again set it aside. The quintet was not completed until 1905. The first performance was in Brussels on 23 March 1906 by the Ysaÿe Quartet with the composer at the piano. The Ysaÿe Quartet and the pianist Raoul Pugno gave the work its first Paris performance the following month at the Salle Pleyel. The score was published by Schirmer in 1907.

== Structure ==
The work is scored for piano and standard string quartet. The playing time of the quintet is generally about 30 minutes. (Note: Some playing times of recordings: The Schubert Ensemble, 28:39; Jean Hubeau and the Via Nova Quartet, 28:44; Peter Orth and the Auryn Quartet, 29:24; Quintetto Fauré di Roma, 30:09; Cristina Ortiz and the Fine Arts Quartet, 30:53; Jean-Philippe Collard and the Parrenin Quartet, 31:33; Pascal Rogé and the Ysaÿe Quartet, 32:28; Germaine Thyssens-Valentin and the Quatuor de l'ORTF, 32:31; Mami Shikimori and the Wihan Quartet, 37:08.)

There are three movements:

=== I. Molto moderato ===
The piano opens the work alone, with high arpeggios which Roger Nichols calls "creditable harp imitations". The strings join in with the modal first theme, ascending and then descending – "at the same time memorable and disturbing", in Nectoux's phrase. The second theme announced fortissimo by the strings alone, is contrastingly more emphatic and rhythmic:

The three notes at A, above, recur during the movement as a motif, and are heard again in the slow movement. The themes are developed, with constant harmonic changes, and the movement ends gently after a coda using a new theme derived from both the first and second. The tempo marking for the movement in the published score is crochet=69, which Nichols suggests is a misprint for crochet=96, which is closer to the tempo usually adopted.

The opening movement is seen by Fauré scholars as among the composer's finest compositions: for Nectoux it is "perhaps the most beautiful in the whole of his chamber music"; for Robert Orledge it is "one of Fauré's best, radiant with life and intensity"; Aaron Copland praises its technical mastery and comments that it "must convince the most recalcitrant ear of Faure's great powers of melody-making".

=== II. Adagio ===
The central slow movement opens in G Major, with the first theme played by the first violin to the accompaniment of undulating repeated chords on the piano. A secondary, contemplative theme is introduced by the piano, after which the lower strings have a more agitated third melody against the piano's rapid semiquavers. The themes are developed, leading to a central section in B minor, which begins tranquilly and gradually increases in intensity. The piano repeats the motif theme from the first movement, before the opening subject of the movement returns. After a brief return of the peaceful theme of the middle section, the movement closes, as it began, in G Major.

The movement has divided opinion among Fauré's admirers. For Copland, in spite of "an expressive middle section" it was "one of Fauré's lesser creations". Nectoux finds the opening berceuse theme "has something rather indefinite about it". For Orledge the movement is "unified and forward-looking" with "a timeless quality to it".

=== III. Allegretto moderato ===
The finale is the first example in Fauré's work of a sonata rondo, a form he favoured in subsequent works. It begins with what the analyst Paul Conway calls "a bright, marching D major theme" for the piano, accompanied by pizzicato strings. This is followed by a bowed counter-subject. The strings then take up the piano theme. After a passage in B minor with leaping octaves, the first theme returns, blending with the second and then restated in pianissimo triplets before rising to a D major climax.

Like the slow movement, the finale has divided critical opinion. Orledge thinks that parts of it are "not among his happiest inspirations" and suggests that Fauré rushed to complete it while coping with his duties as newly appointed Director of the Paris Conservatoire. Nectoux praises "the formal strength of this last movement":

Everything is in its rightful place and the logic of the argument is unshakable. The overall form is of one long crescendo and inside that there are moments when the texture is almost symphonic in feeling, though without any hint of bombast … The effect is rather that of a game well played.

== Notes, references and sources ==
=== Sources ===
- Conway, Paul (2020). Notes to Nimbus CD NI6397. Wyastone Leys: Nimbus Alliance. OCLC 1180967723.
- Fauré, Gabriel (1984). Jean-Michel Nectoux (ed.). Gabriel Fauré: His Life through Letters. London: Boyars. ISBN 978-0-7145-2768-0.
- Nectoux, Jean-Michel (1991). Gabriel Fauré: A Musical Life. Cambridge: Cambridge University Press. ISBN 978-0-521-23524-2.
- Nichols, Roger (2010). Notes to Chandos CD 10576. Colchester: Chandos Records. OCLC 1135154119.
- Orledge, Robert (1979). Gabriel Fauré. London: Eulenberg. ISBN 978-0-903873-40-6.
- Struck-Schloen, Michael (1997). Notes to CPO CD 999 357-2. Georgsmarienhütte: CPO. OCLC 255775505.
