= Francisco Asorey =

Spanish sculptor

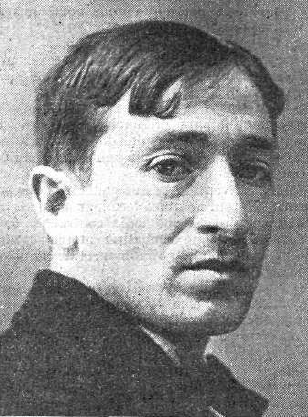
- 1914
- Born: Francisco Asorey González; 4 March 1889; Cambados, Spain
- Died: 2 July 1961 (aged 72); Santiago de Compostela, Spain

Francisco Asorey González (4 March 1889 – 2 July 1961) was a Spanish sculptor. Born in Cambados, Galicia, he was one of the most important Spanish sculptors of the early 20th century. He studied and began work as a religious sculptor in Sarrià, Barcelona, and continued in Barakaldo, Basque Country. He lived and worked in Madrid from 1909 to 1918; then in Santiago de Compostela, Galicia, until his death in 1961.

== Images ==
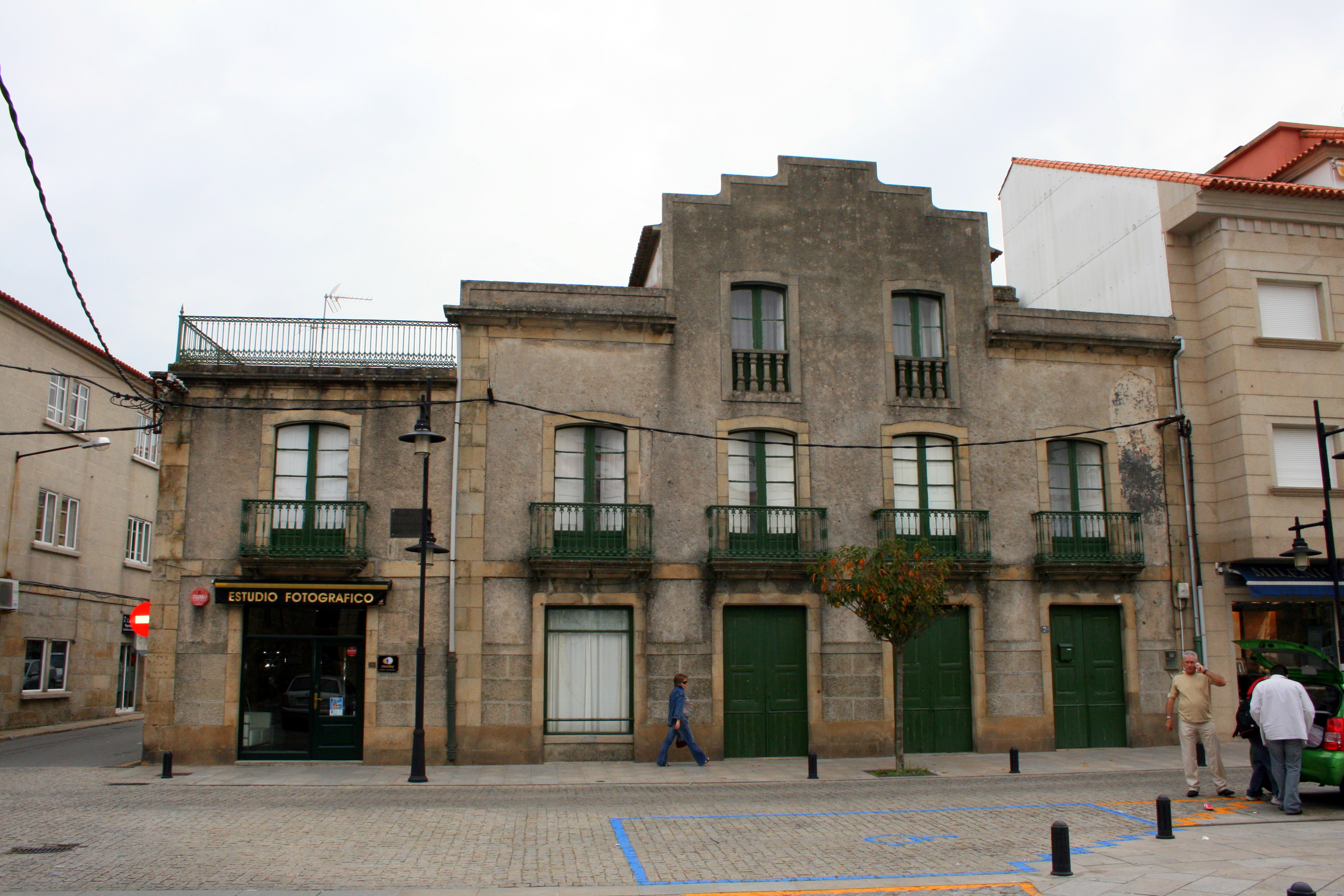
Asorey's birth house in Cambados, Spain

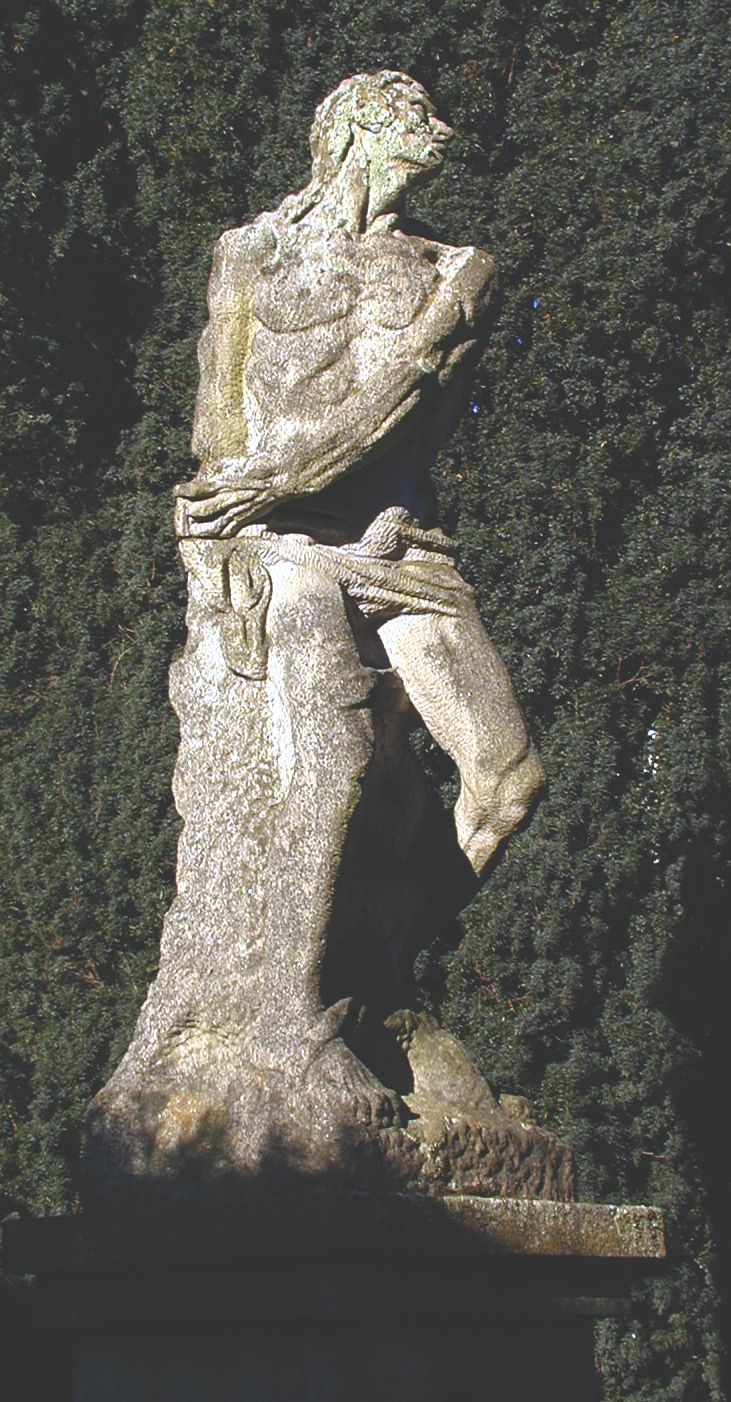
Cabanelas monument, Pontevedra, Spain

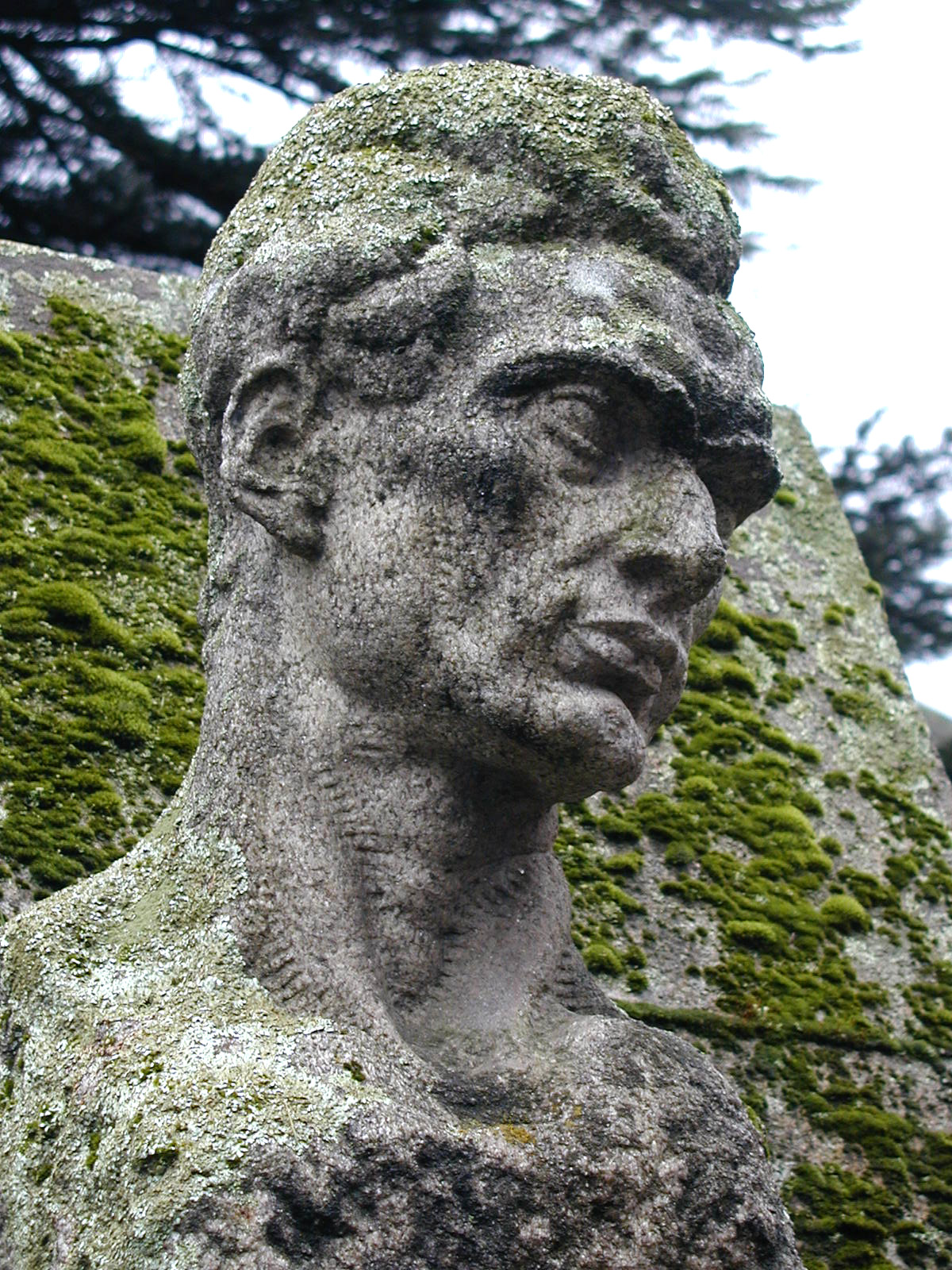
Portrait of the violinist Manuel Quiroga, Pontevedra, Spain

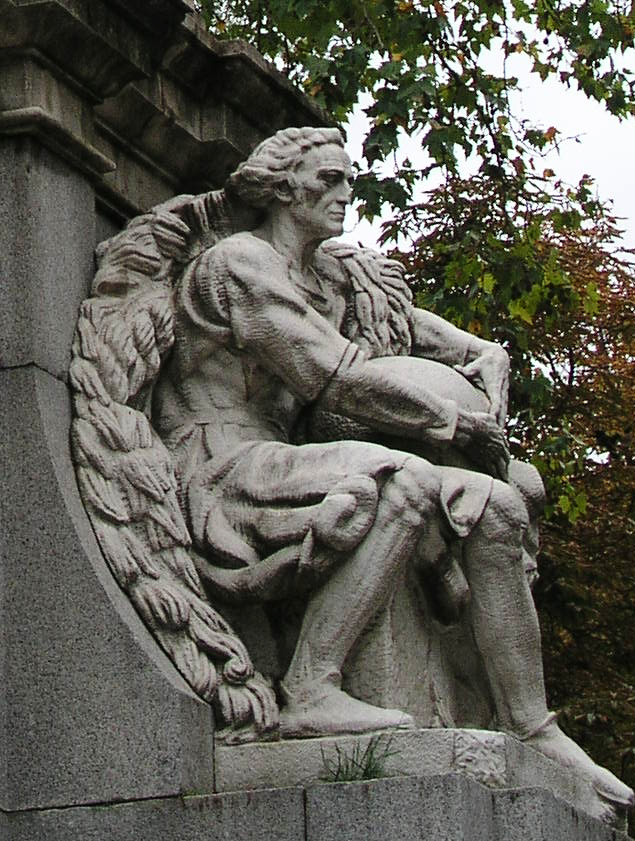
Statue of Columbus, part of the Monument to Cuba, in El Retiro, Madrid

== Sources ==
- El escultor Francisco Asorey, Ramón Otero Túñez, Universidad de Santiago de Compostela, 1959
