= String Quartet (Debussy) =

Composition by Claude Debussy

- by Claude Debussy
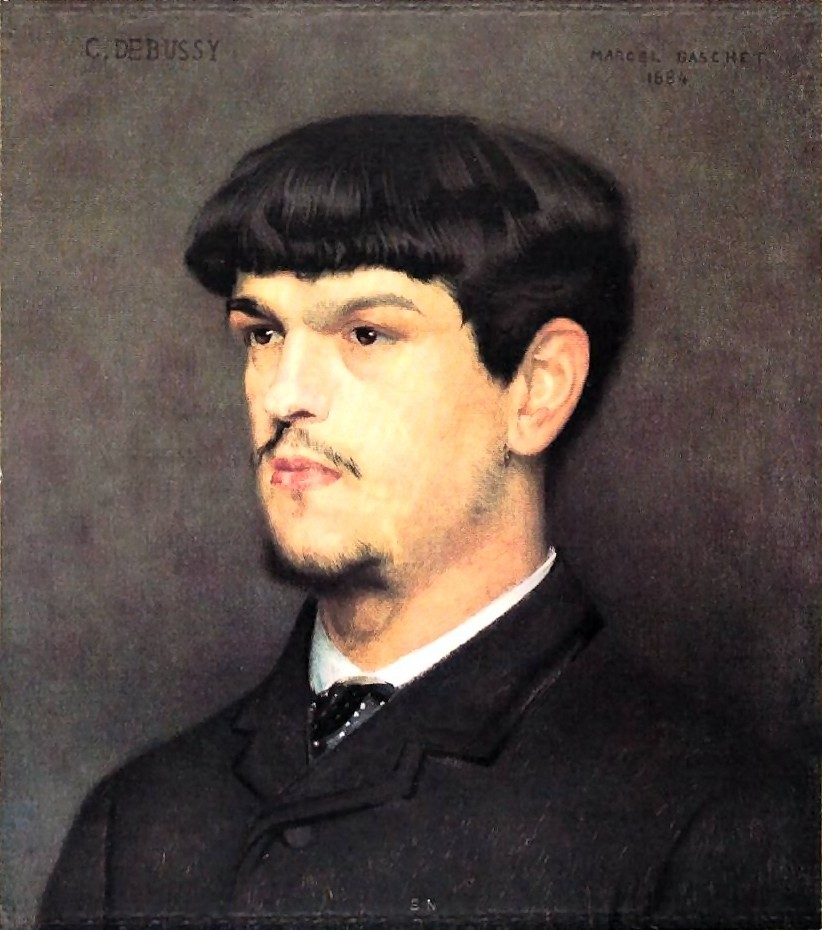
- Debussy in 1884
- Key: G minor
- Catalogue: L 91
- Opus: 10
- Form: String quartet
- Composed: 1892–1893
- Duration: About 25 minutes
- Movements: Four

Premiere
- Date: December 29, 1893
- Location: Société Nationale in Paris
- Performers: Ysaÿe Quartet

Claude Debussy completed his String Quartet in G minor, Op. 10 (L.91), in 1893, when he was 31 years old. It is Debussy's only string quartet.

== Background ==
In 1892, Debussy had just abandoned the opera Rodrigue et Chimène. He planned to write two string quartets, only one of which he completed. The quartet was meant to be dedicated to composer Ernest Chausson, but Chausson's personal reservations diverted this intention.

The quartet received its premiere on December 29, 1893, by the Ysaÿe Quartet at the Société Nationale in Paris, France, to mixed reactions.

== Analysis ==
The work consists of four movements:

1. Animé et très décidé (G minor – D minor – G minor)
2. Assez vif et bien rythmé (G major – E♭ major – G major)
3. Andantino, doucement expressif (D♭ major – C♯ minor – D♭ major)
4. Très modéré – En animant peu à peu – Très mouvementé et avec passion (D♭ major – G minor – C major – G major)

Its sensuality and impressionistic tonal shifts are emblematic of its time and place and its cyclic structure constitutes a divorce from the rules of classical harmony into a new style. After its premiere, composer Guy Ropartz described the quartet as "dominated by the influence of young Russia; there are poetic themes, rare sonorities, the first two movements being particularly remarkable." Debussy said that "Any sounds in any combination and in any succession are henceforth free to be used in a musical continuity."

Maurice Ravel, another impressionist composer, wrote a string quartet that is modeled on Debussy's.
