= Jassen Todorov =

Bulgarian-born American violinist and aerial photographer

- Ясен Тодоров
- Born: Plovdiv, Bulgaria
- Education: Idyllwild Arts Academy
- Alma mater: Harid Conservatory; Eastman School of Music
- Occupations: Violinist, professor of music, pilot, photographer
- Employer: San Francisco State University
- Website: jassentodorov.com

Jassen Todorov (Bulgarian: Ясен Тодоров) is a Bulgarian-born American violinist, professor of music, pilot and aerial photographer. He is a professor of violin at San Francisco State University and works in both classical music and aerial photography. His aerial photography, featured by National Geographic, Smithsonian and other publications, includes natural landscapes, renewable-energy infrastructure, industrial sites and areas altered by human activity.

In 2018, Todorov won the Grand Prize of the National Geographic Photo Contest for Unreal, an aerial photograph showing thousands of Volkswagen and Audi vehicles stored in California's Mojave Desert.

== Early life and education ==
Todorov was born in Plovdiv, Bulgaria, into a family of musicians. His father, Nedeltcho Todorov, was a violin teacher, and Todorov began studying the instrument as a child. He attended music schools in Plovdiv and Sofia and graduated from the Lubomir Pipkov National High School of Music in Sofia.

In 1991, he received a scholarship to attend Idyllwild Arts Academy in Southern California. He later earned a bachelor's degree from the Harid Conservatory in Florida and a master's degree from the Eastman School of Music in Rochester, New York. At Eastman, he studied with violinist Oleh Krysa and served as Krysa's teaching assistant.

Todorov later became a United States citizen. In 2018, National Geographic Bulgaria described him as a U.S. citizen of Bulgarian origin.

== Music career ==
Todorov has performed as a classical violinist in Europe, Asia, Australia and the Americas. His recorded repertoire includes works by Johann Sebastian Bach, Johannes Brahms and Eugène Ysaÿe.

In 2002, he received an Eastman School award for his teaching. In 2006, he received a Crystal Lyre award from the Union of Bulgarian Musicians and Dancers in the young performer category.

He became a professor of violin at San Francisco State University, where he also teaches music theory and music history.

== Photography ==
Todorov began flying in 2002 and subsequently qualified as a commercial pilot and flight instructor. He later combined aviation with photography, making aerial images from light aircraft. A 2015 KQED profile examined his work as a musician, pilot and photographer and reported that Tree of Life, an aerial photograph of Koehn Lake in the Mojave Desert, received first place in the non-professional nature category of the International Photography Awards. The image also earned him the competition's non-professional Nature Photographer of the Year title.

In 2017, National Geographic published a feature on Todorov's aerial photographs of renewable-energy installations and industrial landscapes. The work included solar installations, wind farms, oil-production areas, contaminated sites and other landscapes affected by human activity.

In 2018, Smithsonian published a profile and portfolio of his aerial photography. That December, Unreal won the Grand Prize of the National Geographic Photo Contest. The photograph shows thousands of recalled Volkswagen and Audi vehicles stored near Southern California Logistics Airport following the Volkswagen emissions scandal.

The Painful Aftermath, Todorov's aerial photograph of areas of Santa Rosa, California, affected by the 2017 Northern California wildfires, won the American Experience category of the 16th annual Smithsonian Magazine Photo Contest.

In 2025, Clouds of Gold, an aerial photograph of salt ponds in San Francisco Bay, won the From Source to Sea category of the Environmental Photographer of the Year competition. The photograph was also Highly Commended in the Wetlands: The Bigger Picture category of the 2025 Wildlife Photographer of the Year competition, organized by the Natural History Museum, London.

In January 2026, Smithsonian published another feature on Todorov's aerial photography, including images from the United States, Egypt and other locations. His photograph Symphony of Wings was also shortlisted in the Landscape category of the Open competition at the 2026 Sony World Photography Awards.

== Selected awards ==
- 2006 – Crystal Lyre, young performer category
- 2015 – International Photography Awards, non-professional Nature Photographer of the Year
- 2018 – National Geographic Photo Contest, Grand Prize for Unreal
- 2018 – Smithsonian Magazine Photo Contest, American Experience category for The Painful Aftermath
- 2025 – Environmental Photographer of the Year, From Source to Sea category for Clouds of Gold

== Selected discography ==
- Eugène Ysaÿe: Six Sonatas for Solo Violin, Op. 27 (Gega New, 2013)
- Bach: Three Solo Violin Sonatas (Gega New, 2013)
- Three Solo Violin Partitas (Gega New, 2013)
