= Ysaÿe Quartet (1886) =

Belgian string quartet established in 1886

The original Ysaÿe Quartet was established in Brussels in 1886 by the violinist Eugène Ysaÿe.

Its members were:

- Eugène Ysaÿe, 1st violin
- Mathieu Crickboom, 2nd violin
- Léon van Hout, viola
- Joseph Jacob, cello

The quartet premiered works by Cesar Franck, d'Indy (String Quartet No. 1, 1891), Debussy (String Quartet, 1893) and Fauré (First Piano Quintet, with the composer as pianist, 1906).

All four players made important contributions to the teaching of string playing at the Brussels Conservatory in addition to their careers as soloists.

== Sources ==
- Nectoux, Jean-Michel (1991). Gabriel Fauré: A Musical Life. Cambridge: Cambridge University Press. ISBN 0-521-23524-3.
- Vallas, Léon (1933). Claude Debussy: His Life and Works. Oxford: Oxford University Press. OCLC 458329645.
