= Édouard Nadaud =

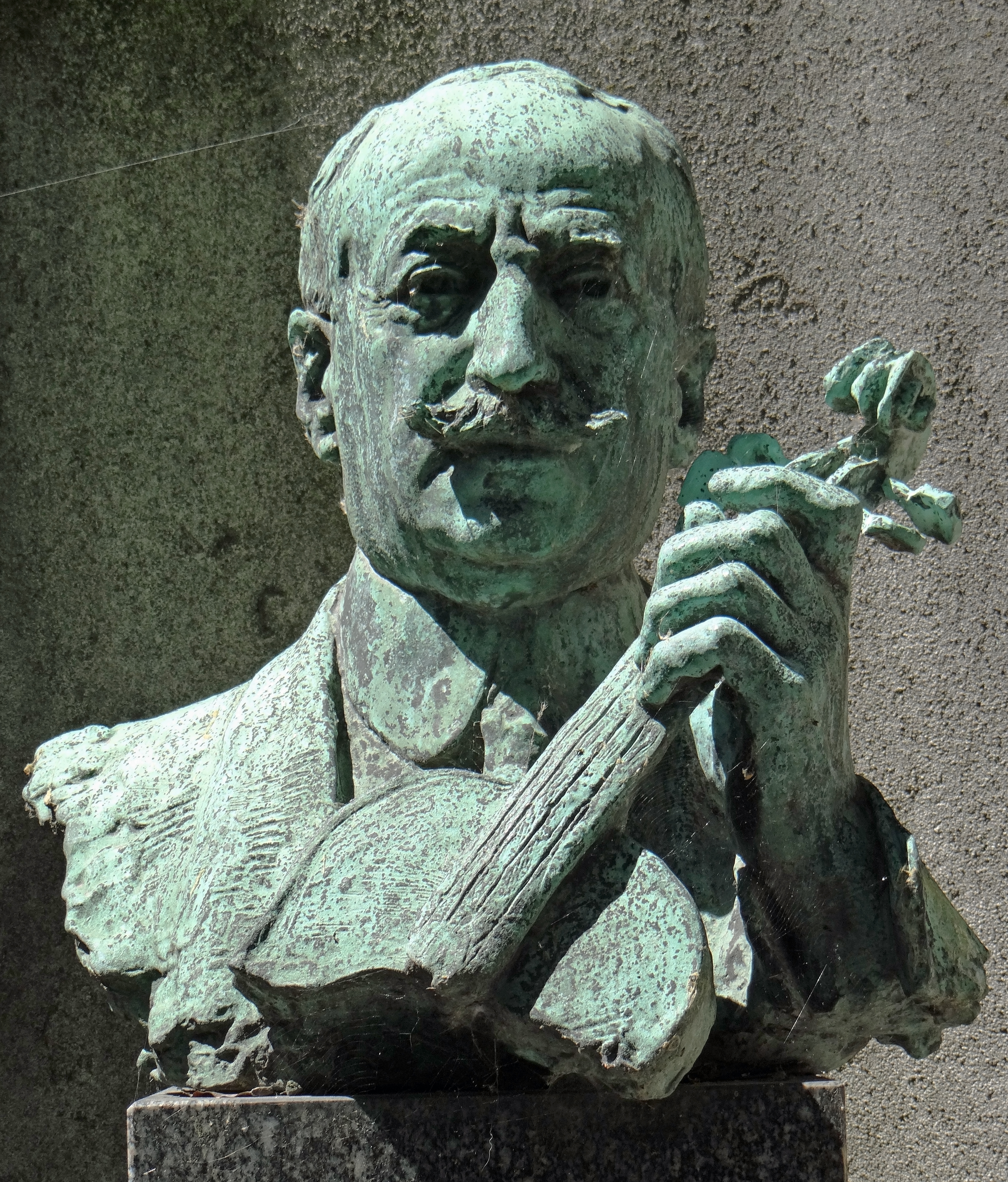
Bust of Édouard Nadaud at the Montmartre Cemetery

Édouard Louis Nadaud (14 April 1862 – 13 February 1928) was a French classical violinist. An heir of the École française du violon, he taught the violin at the Conservatoire de Paris from 1900 to 1924.

== Biography ==
Nadaud was born at 46 rue des Dames (Quartier des Batignolles) in the 17th arrondissement of Paris at the home of his father and mother, paper merchants: he was the fourth child of the couple. His two older brothers, Albert and Gustave were salesmen and the marriage certificate of Gustave teaches us that their father was also a music teacher.

He followed violin lessons at the conservatoire de Paris in Charles Dancla's class and obtained a first prize there in 1881 shared with a young American, Arma Senkrah (Harknes) also a student of Charles Dancla and a young Dutchman, Louis Wolff (1865-1926), a student of Lambert Massart.

Concertmaster of the Orchestre de la Société des concerts du Conservatoire for eleven years, he was professor of violin at the conservatory from 1 May 1900 until his death on 13 February 1928. Firmin Touche succeeded him.

He trained about sixty students including René Benedetti, Marius Casadesus, Line Talluel, Lucien Quatrochi, etc.

== Prizes and distinctions ==
- Second violin accessit in 1877 - Piece of competition: Pierre Baillot's 1st Concerto in A minor
- First violin accessit in 1878 - Piece of competition: Henri Vieuxtemps's 5th Concerto
- Second violin prize in 1880 - Piece of competition: Pierre Rode's 3rd Concerto
- First violin prize in 1881 - Piece of competition: Henri Vieuxtemps's third Concerto
- Chevalier of the Légion d'honneur 2 January 1905.

== Bibliography ==
- Le Conservatoire National de Musique et de déclamation, documents historiques et administratifs, collected or reconstituted by Constant Pierre, deputy head of the secretariat, laureate of the Institute, PARIS, imprimerie Nationale, 1900
