= Mathieu Crickboom =

Belgian violinist

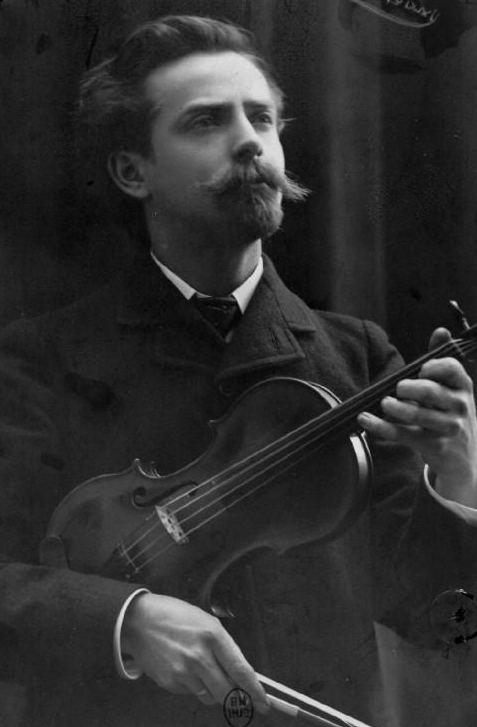
Mathieu Crickboom in 1905

Mathieu Crickboom (2 March 1871 – 30 October 1947) was a Belgian violinist, who was born in Verviers (Hodimont) and died in Brussels.

Crickboom was the principal disciple of Eugène Ysaÿe, who dedicated to him his Sonata for solo violin op. 27 No. 5. In the same vein, Ernest Chausson dedicated his string quartet to Crickboom, who for some years played second violin in the Ysaÿe Quartet.

He lived for a while in Barcelona, where he directed a violin school and a concert society. The year 1897 saw the formation of Crickboom's own quartet, with Pau Casals, cello; Josep Rocabruna, second violin; and Rafael Gálvez, viola.

Having returned to Belgium, he became a professor at the Conservatoire of Liège and, subsequently, at the Conservatoire of Brussels. It was in Brussels that he spent most of his later life. He edited numerous violin concertos by great composers of the 18th and 19th centuries, but his principal work was his violin method, arranged into progressive etudes, duos, popular melodies and technical themes. Most of the pieces in this method were by great violin pedagogues of the 19th century, though some were by Crickboom himself.
