= International Violin Competition of Indianapolis =

Quadrennial competition held in Indianapolis, Indiana, US

- Status: Active
- Genre: Competition
- Frequency: Every four years
- Locations: Indianapolis, Indiana
- Country: USA
- Inaugurated: 1982
- Founder: Josef Gingold
- Most recent: 2022
- Member: World Federation of International Music Competitions
- Website: www.violin.org

The International Violin Competition of Indianapolis (IVCI) is a classical violin competition which takes place once every four years in Indianapolis, Indiana. Since its founding in 1982, "The Indianapolis" has been regarded as the Olympics of the Violin, and dubbed "the ultimate violin contest" by the Chicago Tribune.

== History ==
Founded in 1982 under the artistic guidance of Josef Gingold and Founding Director Thomas J. Beczkiewicz, the IVCI became recognized by the World Federation of International Music Competitions and has been a member of that federation since 1984. Gingold, an esteemed professor of violin at the Jacobs School of Music at Indiana University in Bloomington, IN, had served on the juries of every major violin competition in the world and became the IVCI's Founding Artistic Director. In 1994, artistic leadership passed to one of his most well-known pupils, Jaime Laredo, who retains the title of Jury President to this day.

For the 12th Quadrennial Competition in September-October 2026, the prize for the Gold Medal winner included a cash prize of US$75,000, a gold medal, a recording contract, and a recital debut at Carnegie Hall. The Gold, Silver and bronze medalists receive career management for four years, and Laureates have the opportunity to use one of several instruments owned by the IVCI, including the 1683 "ex-Gingold" Stradivarius violin.

The 13th Quadrennial Competition will take place in Fall 2030.

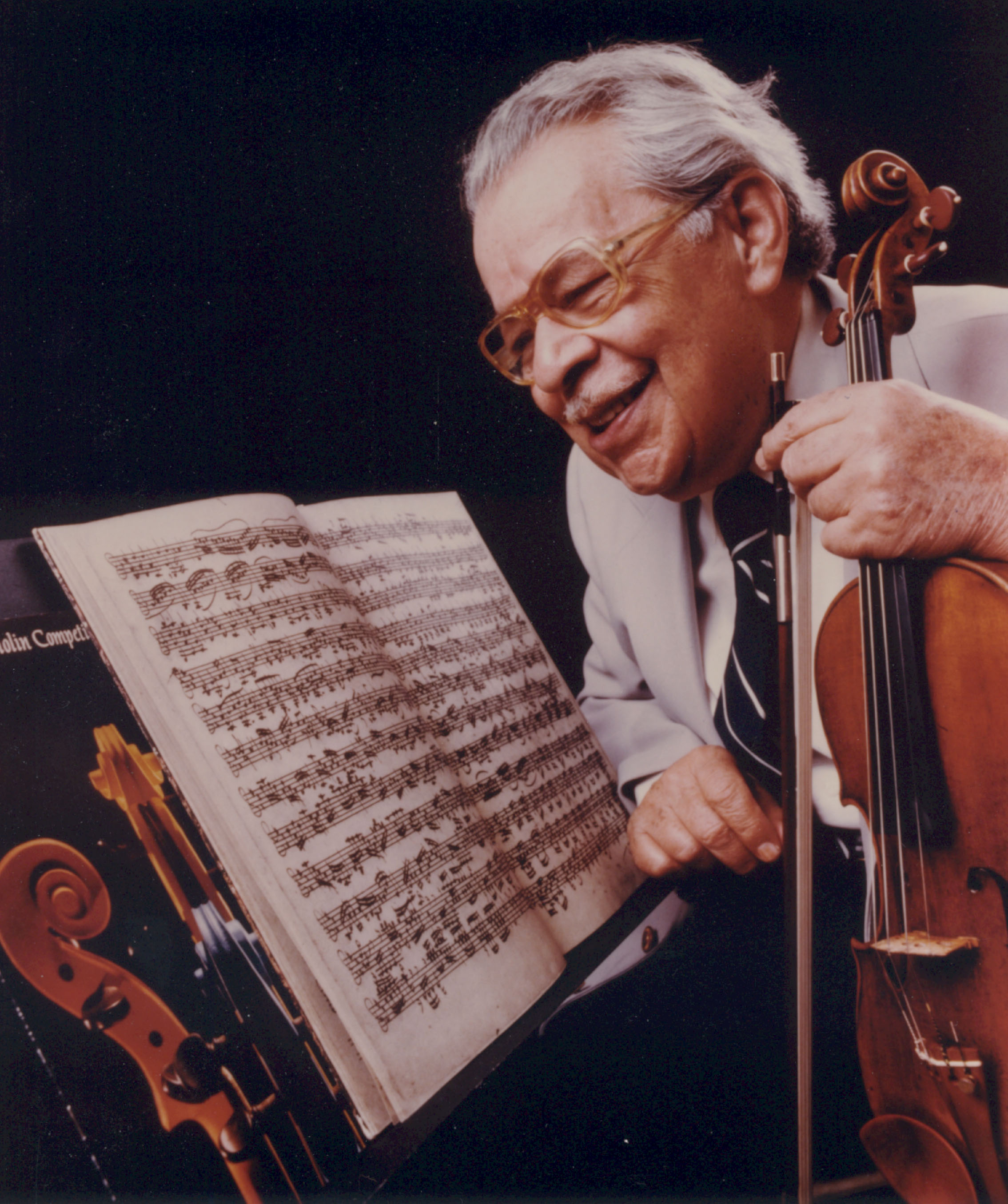
Josef Gingold, IVCI Founding Artistic Director (1982)

== Competition ==
12th Quadrennial Competition Participants - September 2026

The competition is typically composed of four parts:

- Preliminaries (40 participants). The first round consists of a 45-minute recital, concentrating on one of the solo violin sonatas by Ysaÿe (or Hindemith's Sonata for Solo Violin, Op. 31, No. 2, Prokofiev's Sonata for Solo Violin in D, Op. 115, or Reger's Sonata for Solo Violin in A, Op. 42, No. 2), violin sonatas by Mozart, plus two of Paganini's 24 Caprices for Solo Violin or Paganiniana by Nathan Milstein, or H. W. Ernst's No. 6 from Six Polyphonic Etudes: Variations on The Last Rose of Summer, or one Paganini Caprice plus H. W. Ernst's Grand Caprice on Schubert's Der Erlkönig, Op. 26. Each participant must also perform one encore work.
- Semi-Finals (16 participants). Each participant performs a 75-minute recital consisting of any violin sonata by Beethoven, plus two additional works (typically with piano accompaniment). Each participant is given a list of over sixty works from which to choose. Included in this round is a compulsory work, commissioned specifically for each Competition.
- Classical Finals (6 participants). Each Finalist performs a violin concerto by Mozart or Haydn, plus an encore work by Fritz Kreisler, arranged by Jaakko Kuusisto (1994 IVCI Laureate), performed with a chamber orchestra.
- Finals (6 participants). Each Finalist performs one of 20 major violin concertos with the Indianapolis Symphony Orchestra.

== Commissioned works ==
Year	Work Title	Composer
1982	Improvvisazione	Joonas Kokkonen
1986	For Solo Violin	Leon Kirchner
1990	Rhapsody and Prayer	Georges Rochberg
1994	Subito	Witold Lutoslawski
1998	Autumn Music	Ned Rorem
2002	As Night Falls on Barjeantane	Richard Danielpour
2006	A Night at the Chinese Opera	Bright Sheng
2010	String Force	Joan Tower
2014	Fantasy for Solo Violin	Ellen Taaffe Zwilich
2018	Suite No. 3 for Solo Violin	William Bolcom
2022	Incontro	John Harbison
2026	Rhapsody No. 3 for Solo Violin	Jessie Montgomery

== Past winners (laureates) ==
Year	Gold	Silver	Bronze	Fourth	Fifth	Sixth
2026	(United States) Karisa Chiu	(United States) Elli Choi	(China) Aozhe Zhang	(China) Xunyue Zhang	(United States) Yesong Sophie Lee	(Japan) Lina Nakano
2022	(United States) Sirena Huang	(United States) Julian Rhee	(Japan) Minami Yoshida	(United States) Claire Wells	(South Korea) SooBeen Lee	(United States) Joshua Brown
2018	(United States) / (Taiwan) Richard Lin	(Japan) Risa Hokamura	(United States) Luke Hsu	(United States) Anna Lee	(Romania) Ioana Cristina Goicea	(United States) / (Canada) Shannon Lee
2014	(South Korea) Jinjoo Cho	(United States) Tessa Lark	(South Korea) Ji Young Lim	(South Korea) Dami Kim	(South Korea) Yoo Jin Jang	(South Korea) Ji Yoon Lee
2010	(Germany) / (South Korea) Clara-Jumi Kang	(South Korea) Soyoung Yoon	(United States) Benjamin Beilman	(China) Haoming Xie	(Hungary) Antal Szalai	(Russia) Andrey Baranov
2006	(Germany) Augustin Hadelich	(Netherlands) Simone Lamsma	(United States) Celeste Golden	(South Korea) Yura Lee	(South Korea) Ye-Eun Choi	(Bulgaria) Bella Hristova
2002	(Hungary) Barnabás Kelemen	(Armenia) Sergey Khachatryan	(United States) Soovin Kim	(United States) Frank Huang	(Australia) Susie Park	(Germany) Alina Pogostkina
1998	(Iceland) Judith Ingolfsson	(Romania) Liviu Prunaru	(South Korea) Ju-Young Baek	(Bulgaria) Svetlin Roussev	(United Kingdom) Andrew Haveron	(China) Bin Huang
1994	(Canada) Juliette Kang	(Federal Republic of Yugoslavia) Stefan Milenkovich	(United States) David Chan	(Finland) Jaakko Kuusisto	(Japan) Michiko Kamiya	(United States) Robin Sharp
1990	(Soviet Union) Pavel Berman	(Italy) Marco Rizzi	(United States) Ivan Chan	(France) Virginie Robilliard	(United States) David Kim	(Canada) Martin Beaver
1986	(Japan) Kyoko Takezawa	(Greece) Leonidas Kavakos	(United States) Andrés Cárdenes	(South Korea) Chin Kim	(South Korea) Sungsic Yang	(France) Annick Roussin
1982	(Romania) Mihaela Martin	(United States) Ida Kavafian	(Israel) Yuval Yaron	(France) Olivier Charlier	(Taiwan) Nai-Yuan Hu	(Japan) Yuriko Naganuma

From the competition website.

== Jury members ==
Year	Jury President	Jury Members
1982	Josef Gingold	Michael Colgrass, Miriam Fried, Franco Gulli, Irving Kolodin, Jaime Laredo, Raymond Gallois Montbrun, Igor Ozim, Henry Roth, Hidetaro Suzuki, Zvi Zeitlin
1986	Josef Gingold	Henryk Szeryng (Vice President), Michèle Auclair, Dorothy DeLay, Ilona Fehér, Stefan Gheorghiu, Franco Gulli, Yfrah Neaman, Igor Ozim, Ruggerio Ricci, Hidetaro Suzuki
1990	Josef Gingold	Dorothy DeLay, Pavel Kogan, Joonas Kokkonen, Mihaela Martin*, Elmar Oliveira, Igor Ozim, Aaron Rosand, Josef Suk, Hidetaro Suzuki, Tibor Varga
1994	Jaime Laredo	Pierre Amoyal, Tuomas Haapanen, Ida Kavafian*, Cho-Liang Lin, Igor Oistrakh, Igor Ozim, György Pauk, Hidetaro Suzuki
1998	Jaime Laredo	Pierre Amoyal, Franco Gulli, Ida Kavafian*, Young Uck Kim, Malcolm Lowe, Igor Oistrakh, Ruggiero Ricci, Kyoko Takezawa*
2002	Jaime Laredo	Olivier Charlier*, Tuomas Haapanen, Ida Kavafian*, Mikhail Kopelman, Cho-Liang Lin, Malcolm Lowe, György Pauk, Kyoko Takezawa*
2006	Jaime Laredo	Pierre Amoyal, Pamela Frank, Rodney Friend, Cho-Liang Lin, Malcolm Lowe, Igor Oistrakh†, Joel Smirnoff, Kyoko Takezawa*
2010	Jaime Laredo	Pamela Frank, Rodney Friend, Yuzuko Horigome, Jean-Jacques Kantorow, Boris Kuschnir, Cho-Liang Lin, Mihaela Martin*, Joel Smirnoff
2014	Jaime Laredo	Miriam Fried, Dong-Suk Kang, Boris Kuschnir, Cho-Liang Lin, Philip Setzer, Dmitry Sitkovetsky, Kyoko Takezawa*, Ellen Taaffe Zwilich
2018	Jaime Laredo	Pamela Frank, Rodney Friend, Dong-Suk Kang, Cho-Liang Lin, Mihaela Martin*, Dmitri Sitkovetski, Arnold Steinhardt, Kyoko Takezawa*
2022	Jaime Laredo	Noah Bendix-Balgley, Ivan Chan, Jinjoo Cho*, Yuzuko Horigome, Dong-Suk Kang, Cho-Liang Lin, Mihaela Martin*, Liviu Prunaru
2026	Jaime Laredo	David Chan*, Jinjoo Cho*, Pamela Frank, Yuzuko Horigome, Bella Hristova*, Dong-Suk Kang, Cho-Liang Lin, Svetlin Roussev*

* IVCI Laureate

†Unable to attend

== Juried Exhibition of Student Art (JESA) ==
The Juried Exhibition of Student Art (JESA) is one of the most far-reaching multi-disciplinary art projects for grades one through twelve in the state of Indiana and held in conjunction with the Quadrennial International Violin Competition of Indianapolis. In 2026, the IVCI expanded the program into Ohio for the first time in its history. more than 8,000 students from 121 schools across 52 counties participated in Ohio, while in Indiana, over 11,000 students from 119 schools in 54 counties registered. JESA is one of the few programs that awards a cash prize to each school or sponsoring organization of the Grand Award Winners as well as to the students. The IVCI awarded $18,000 in prizes to outstanding artists and their schools or sponsoring organizations in 2022.

The program was designed to affirm the highest standards of visual arts; to encourage the pursuit of visual arts as a career; to help integrate the disciplines of the performing and the visual arts; to increase community support for the arts; and to heighten student awareness of the IVCI and its cultural importance to the entire state.

== See also ==
- List of attractions and events in Indianapolis
