= Juliette Kang =

Canadian violinist (b. 1975)

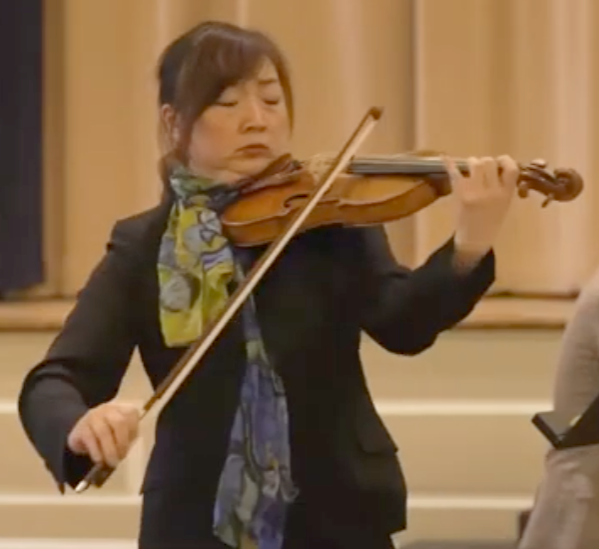
- Playing a Brahms violin sonata in 2022

Background information
- Born: September 6, 1975 (age 49); Edmonton, Alberta, Canada
- Occupation: Musician
- Instrument: Violin

Juliette Kang (born September 6, 1975) is a Canadian violinist. In 1994, she earned the gold medal at the International Violin Competition of Indianapolis. Kang went on to have an international solo career. She joined the Philadelphia Orchestra in 2005, where she holds the position of first associate concertmaster.

== Early life, education, and early performances ==
Kang was born in Edmonton, Alberta, on September 6, 1975. Her parents (her father was an urban planner; her mother, a piano teacher) had immigrated to Canada from Korea. She was a child prodigy, beginning violin lessons at age four in a Suzuki class and soon starting lessons with Edmonton Symphony Orchestra concertmaster James Keene. She made her concerto debut in Montreal at age seven.

At age nine, Kang accepted a scholarship to the Curtis Institute of Music in Philadelphia, where she studied with Jascha Brodsky. She earned a Bachelor of Music degree in 1991. She went on to study with Dorothy DeLay at Juilliard, earning a master's degree in 1993.

As a young violinist, Kang won top prizes at multiple competitions, including the 1989 Young Concert Artists international auditions in New York (becoming, at age 13, the youngest artist to win that competition); the 1992 Yehudi Menuhin International Competition for Young Violinists in Paris; the 1992 Philadelphia Orchestra Student Competition; and the 1994 International Violin Competition of Indianapolis.

Kang first performed with her hometown orchestra, the Edmonton Symphony Orchestra, at age 11. She made her New York City recital debut at the 92nd Street Y in 1993. In 1994, she joined the Edmonton Symphony Orchestra for a six-day tour of northern Canada. She made her Carnegie Hall recital debut in 1996.

== Career ==
Kang has performed as a soloist in concertos with orchestras throughout Canada (including the Montreal Symphony Orchestra, the Vancouver Symphony Orchestra, and the Toronto Symphony Orchestra) and the United States (including the Philadelphia Orchestra in subscription concerts, the Indianapolis Symphony Orchestra, the Baltimore Symphony Orchestra, and the San Francisco Symphony). She has also performed internationally with the Orchestre National de France, the Vienna Chamber Orchestra, and the Hong Kong Philharmonic Orchestra.

In 1999, Kang joined the Kennedy Center Opera Orchestra as principal second violin. She then held a first violin position with the Metropolitan Opera Orchestra from 2001 to 2003, then was assistant concertmaster of the Boston Symphony Orchestra from 2003. In 2005, she joined the Philadelphia Orchestra as first associate concertmaster, a position she continues to hold in 2025.

== Personal life ==
In 2001, Kang married cellist Thomas Kraines, whom she had met as a student at Curtis. The couple performs chamber music together. They have two daughters.

== Selected discography ==
- Debut Recording (1994), by Juliette Kang. Discover International.
- Affairs of the Heart: Music of Marjan Mozetich (2000; reissued 2015), by Juliette Kang, Nora Bumanis, Julia Shaw, CBC Vancouver Orchestra, and Mario Bernardi. CBC Records.
