= Jinjoo Cho =

South Korean violinist (born 1988)

Jinjoo Cho 조진주
- Born: July 12, 1988 (age 38); Seoul, South Korea
- Genre: Classical
- Occupations: Musician, Associate Professor at Bienen School of Music
- Instruments: Violin
- Website: jinjoocho.com

Jinjoo Cho (Korean: 조진주; born 1988) is a South Korean violinist. She gained international recognition after winning first prize at the International Violin Competition of Indianapolis in 2014. Cho has performed extensively as a soloist and chamber musician and currently teaches violin in the United States.

== Early life and education ==
Cho was born in Seoul, South Korea. She graduated from Yewon Art School and also attended the Pre-College program at the Korean National University of Arts. In 2002, she moved to the United States, where she studied in the Young Artist Program at the Cleveland Institute of Music (2002–2006) under Paul Kantor. Cho continued her education at the Curtis Institute of Music (2006–2007), studying with Joseph Silverstein and Pamela Frank. She returned to the Cleveland Institute of Music and received her Bachelor of Music degree in 2011 under Kantor. Cho completed her Master of Music degree in 2013 and obtained a Professional Studies certificate in 2015, both under Jaime Laredo.

== Career ==
Jinjoo has been performing on concert stages worldwide since the age of 11. Her performances have taken her to numerous venues and festivals, including Carnegie Hall, Severance Hall in Cleveland, the Aspen Music Festival, La Jolla SummerFest, Banff Centre, Festival de Lanaudière, La Seine Musicale, Kronberg Academy, Schwetzingen Festspiele, Herkulessaal in Munich, Teatro Colón in Buenos Aires, and the Seoul Arts Center.

She has performed as a soloist with orchestras such as The Cleveland Orchestra, Orchestre symphonique de Montréal, Deutsche Radio Philharmonic, Orquesta Clásica Santa Cecilia, Ensemble Appassionato, Seoul Philharmonic Orchestra, and the symphony orchestras of North Carolina, Phoenix, and Charlotte. Cho has collaborated with renowned conductors, including James Gaffigan, Kent Nagano, JoAnn Falletta, Karina Canellakis, Mathieu Herzog, Peter Oundjian, Michael Stern, Tito Muñoz, Michael Francis, Moritz Gnann, Sung Shi-Yeon, Pietari Inkinen, and Clemens Schuldt.

As a chamber musician, Cho has performed with distinguished artists such as Gary Hoffman, Andreas Ottensamer, Ray Chen, Itamar Golan, Roger Tapping, Jaime Laredo, Sharon Robinson, Vadim Gluzman, and Clive Greensmith. In 2021, she formed Trio Seoul with pianist Kyu Yeon Kim and cellist Brannon Cho.

== Teaching and other activities ==
Cho is currently an Associate Professor of Violin at Northwestern University's Bienen School of Music. She has previously held faculty positions at McGill University, Cleveland Institute of Music, and Oberlin Conservatory. Cho regularly serves as a juror for prestigious international competitions, including the Sibelius, Indianapolis, and Schoenfeld competitions. She has also served on screening committees for the Isang Yun, Premio Paganini, and Montréal competitions.

In 2015, Cho founded the ENCORE Chamber Music Institute in Cleveland, Ohio, providing intensive chamber music education and performance opportunities. She has commissioned new works from composers Juri Seo and Andrew Rindfleisch and has collaborated with artists from various fields, including choreographer Jinyeob Cha and dancer Lip J.

Cho published her first book, Shine Someday, a collection of essays, in 2021. The book became a bestseller in South Korea, offering personal insights into her life and career as an artist.
