= Concerto for Violin and Strings (Mendelssohn) =

Composition by Felix Mendelssohn

Concerto for Violin
- by Felix Mendelssohn
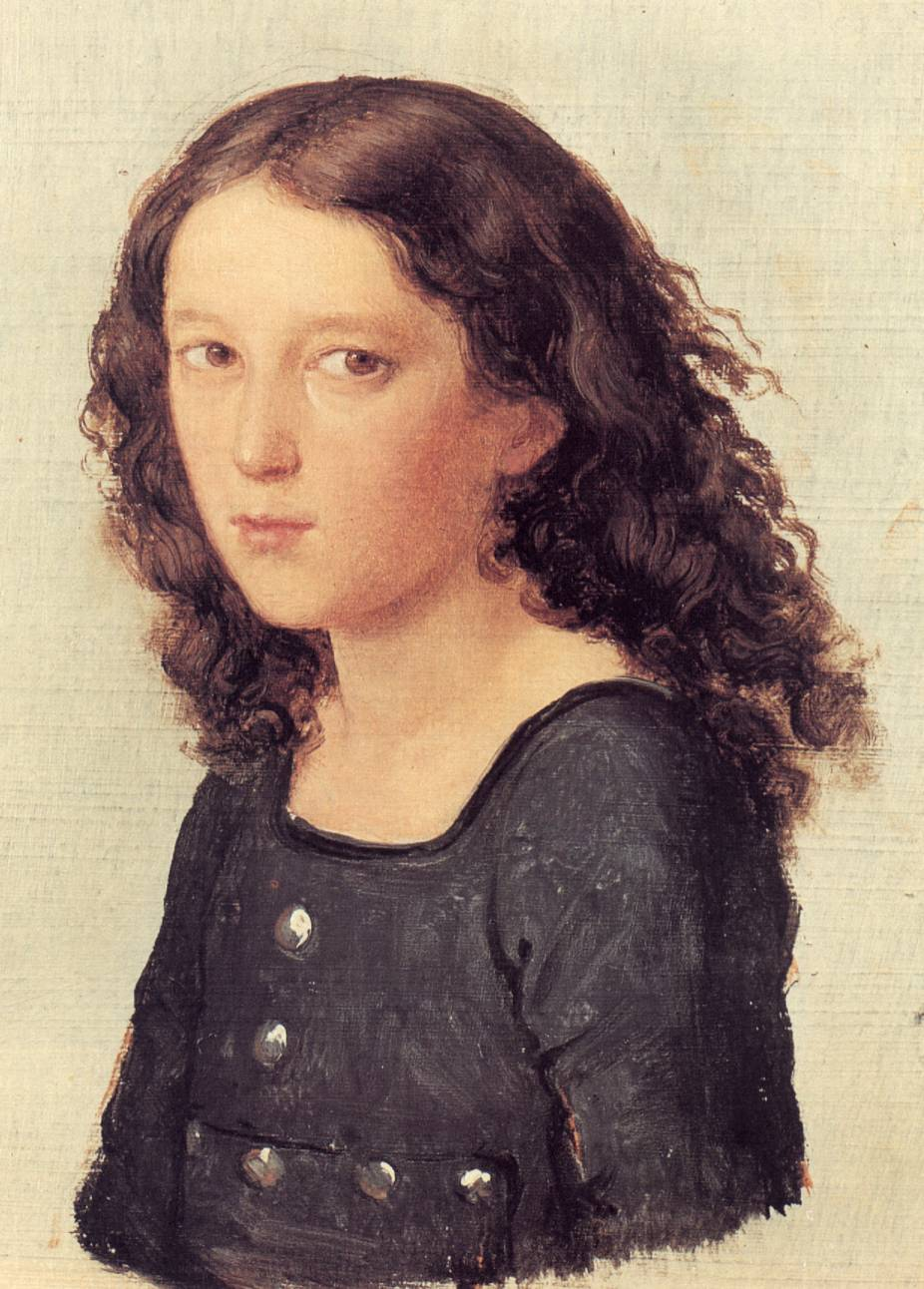
- Portrait of the composer by Carl Joseph Begas, 1821
- Key: D minor
- Catalogue: MWV O 3
- Period: Romantic
- Genre: Concerto
- Composed: 1822
- Movements: 3
- Scoring: Violin and orchestra

Premiere
- Date: 4 February 1952
- Location: New York City, New York

The Concerto for Violin and String Orchestra in D minor, MWV O 3, was composed by Felix Mendelssohn at the age of thirteen. It has three movements, Allegro–Andante–Allegro, and performance duration is approximately 22 minutes.

== Felix Mendelssohn ==
Mendelssohn was considered by many of his time to be a prodigy comparable only to the young Wolfgang Amadeus Mozart. Besides being a brilliant piano virtuoso, his composition took a firm step forward in musical development. In the period when this concerto was composed (from 1821 to 1823 while aged 12 to 14) Mendelssohn composed twelve string symphonies. At the age of eleven, he had written a trio for strings, a violin and piano sonata, two piano sonatas and the beginning of a third, three more for four hands, four for organ, three songs (lieder), and a cantata.

== The concerto ==
Mendelssohn wrote this violin concerto for Eduard Rietz (eldest brother of Julius Rietz), a beloved friend and teacher who later served as concertmaster for Mendelssohn's legendary performance of Johann Sebastian Bach's St Matthew Passion, which has been thought to have resurrected Bach in the public image.

When Mendelssohn died, his widow gave the manuscript of the long forgotten concerto to Ferdinand David, another close friend of Mendelssohn's and a leading violinist of the period, who in fact had premiered his Violin Concerto in E minor.

== Structure ==
The concerto consists of three movements:

1. Allegro
2. Andante
3. Allegro

== Revival of the concerto ==
Yehudi Menuhin, the violin virtuoso, was shown the manuscript of the concerto in the spring of 1951 in London by Albi Rosenthal, an amateur violinist and rare books dealer. He bought the rights to the concerto from members of the Mendelssohn family residing in Switzerland. Menuhin edited the concerto for performance and had it published by Peters Edition.

On 4 February 1952, Menuhin introduced the concerto to a Carnegie Hall audience with a "string Band", conducting the concerto from the violin. Menuhin played the work often in recital, and made three recordings of it. The first was made immediately after the New York premiere, with him conducting the RCA Victor String Orchestra (his conducting debut on record), the second made the following year with Sir Adrian Boult and the Philharmonia Orchestra, and the last in 1971 with Rafael Frühbeck de Burgos.

The critics were pleased with the New York premiere. The New York Times admired its "lively jesting finale in the gypsy style", while the New York Sun called it "utterly delightful" and thanked Menuhin for bringing the manuscript to the world's attention. Menuhin himself loved the concerto and thought Mendelssohn was probably quite proud of it. He also found points of similarity with the later E minor Concerto. He said:

"Both are in minor, in a somewhat tumultuous mood: The written out cadenzas, of the second and third movements; a long solo passage of short notes in the last movement reminiscent of the passage of the third of the E minor which ushers in the recapitulation...

"The Concerto in D minor is full of invention and not in any way inhibited by too-strict traditional concepts. It exhibits, in fact, a remarkable freedom and elasticity of form. There is, for instance, a condensation and amplification with Schubertarian modulations of the exposition in the recapitulation for the first movement, and also a completely spontaneous treatment of the third."

However the concerto has not established itself as a staple of the violin repertory, as has the E minor Concerto.

== Recordings ==
- Marat Bisengaliev (violin), Andrew Penny (conductor), Royal Northern Sinfonia (1996), Naxos 8.553844 (1998)
- Angèle Dubeau (violin), Joseph Rescigno (conductor), Orchestre Métropolitain (Montréal) (1997), FL 2 3098 (??)
- Sergej Krylov (violin), V. Czarnacki (conductor), Southwest German Chamber Orchestra (Pforzheim), recorded 1996, AG 69
- Alberto Lysy (violin), Camerata Lysy (Gstaad), 1999, Claves 509213
- Gidon Kremer (violin), Orpheus Chamber Orchestra (1989) Deutsche Grammophon
- Viktoria Mullova (violin), Neville Marriner (conductor), Academy of St Martin-in-the-Fields, recorded 1990, Philips 432-077-2
- Mayumi Seiler (violin), Richard Hickox (conductor), City of London Sinfonia, recorded 1991, VCL 2-61504
- Liviu Prunaru (violin), Concertgebouw Kammerorchester, Avrotros Klassiek, 2016
- Isabelle van Keulen (violin), Lev Markiz (conductor), Nieuw Sinfonietta Amsterdam, recorded 1995, BIS CD-935
- Kyoko Takezawa (violin), Bamberg Symphony, Claus Peter Flor (conductor), 1994
- Alina Ibragimova (violin), Orchestra of the Age of Enlightenment, Vladimir Jurowski (conductor), 2011
- Yehudi Menuhin (violin), Rafael Frühbeck de Burges, London Symphony Orchestra, (1972) Angel S-36850

== Sources ==
1. Humphrey Burton. "Yehudi Menuhin - A Life". Northeastern University Press. 2000.
2. Edition Peters. "Mendelssohn Violin Concerto in D Minor". Edited by Yehudi Menuhin. 1952.
