= Liu Yang (violinist) =

Yang Liu
- Born: China
- Genres: Classical
- Occupation: Violinist
- Instrument: Violin

Yang Liu (Chinese: 刘扬; pinyin: Liú Yáng) is a Chinese-American violinist. He has toured in North America, South America and Asia with multiple orchestras. Liu also often travels with his wife Olivia in concert tours across the United States and Asia. He is an advocate of cultural exchange via classical music, and is a founder of the Yang and Olivia Foundation and Momento Virtuosi, a chamber ensemble featuring diverse ethnicity and instrumentation.

Liu studied in Central Conservatory with Professor Yaoji Lin in Beijing and College-Conservatory of Music in Cincinnati with professor Kurt Sassmannshaus and Dorothy Delay. Liu became an American citizen in 2014.

Liu was the winner of China's 5th National Violin Competition and a prize winner of the Twelfth International Tchaikovsky Competition in Moscow.

His first performance in North America was in 2002 with the Atlanta Symphony Orchestra, performing Paganini's First Violin Concerto. This success was followed by touring engagements with the St. Louis Symphony Orchestra, conducted by Robert Spano: Cincinnati Symphony Orchestra, Cincinnati Chamber Orchestra, the Odense Symphony Orchestra, Denmark, and São Paulo Symphony, Brazil. He also completed a 5-city tour in China performing the Butterfly Concerto with the Qingdao Symphony Orchestra, as part of the China-US cultural exchange initiated by Secretary of State of the US John Kerry, and chairman of the cultural department of China, Mr. Luo.

Liu was featured in a documentary called String of heart--Yang Liu, highlighting Yang's artistic life. This production was aired on CCTV (China Central Television) throughout China, together with his autobiographical book Performing in Love, which was published in the spring of 2014.

Liu lives in Chicago with his wife Olivia and two boys. He has performed and taught at the Great Wall Music Academy, the Aspen Music Festival, the Ravinia Festival, the Chicago classical music radio WFMT, SESC international music festival of Brazil, and gives master classes in major universities and music conservatories such as the VanderCook College of Music.
