= Dylan Hamme =

American violinist

Dylan Hamme (born about 2003) is an American violinist who plays classic and contemporary music. He debuted with the New York Philharmonic when he was about 8. He has performed at the Metropolitan Opera, with the Bergen Philharmonic, with the National Youth Orchestra of the USA, and the Saint Paul Chamber Orchestra.

== Early life and education ==
Hamme is the son of Gary Hamme, an oboist, and Lisa Hansen, a flutest. He attended the Elisabeth Morrow School in Englewood, New Jersey, the Manhattan School of Music's pre-college division, followed by Juilliard.

== Career ==
Hamme debuted with the New York Philharmonic in June 2011, when he was about 8. When he was 11, Hamme was discovered by producers of NBC's The Today Show busking in New York City. He later appeared on the program performing Lalo's Symphonie Espagnole and Bach's Concerto for Two Violins in D Minor with Joshua Bell. In March 2015, when he was 12, Dylan made his concert debut performing Lalo's Symphonie Espagnole with the Bergen Philharmonic. The same year, he was performing in Carmen with the Met.

In 2021, he was invited to join the National Youth Orchestra of the United States of America.

In 2024, as a student at Juilliard, he won a concerto competition that lead to a performance of the Ligeti Violin Concerto with the Juilliard AXIOM Ensemble, Jeffrey Milarsky, conductor. His teachers include Catherine Cho and Areta Zhulla at Juilliard in addition to teachers and mentors Ying Fu, Amelia Gold, Ray Iwazumi, and Scott Yoo.

In 2025, Hamme made his Carnegie Hall debut winning the Waldo Mayo Violin Competition with a performance of the Tchaikovsky Violin Concerto with the Senior Concert Orchestra of New York.

He has appeared as a guest musician with the Saint Paul Chamber Orchestra.

== Awards ==
In 2014, he won the Manhattan School of Music's Chamber Music Competition, with a co-performer.

In 2024, he won Julliard's Ligeti Violin Concerto Competition.

In 2025, he won the Waldo Mayo Violin Competition. The same year, he also won 3rd prize in the Joseph Bologne Violin Competition held in Guadeloupe.
