= Lim Ji-young =

Ji Young Lim
- Born: 1995 (age 29–30); Seoul, Korea
- Genres: Classical Music
- Occupation: Violinist
- Instrument: Violin
- Website: www.jiyoung-lim.com

Korean name
- Hangul: 임지영
- RR: Im Jiyeong
- MR: Im Chiyŏng

Lim Ji-young (Korean: 임지영, born 1995) is a South Korean violinist, winner of the first prize in the 2015 Queen Elisabeth Competition in Brussels. She studies with Nam-Yun Kim at Korea National University of Arts.

Lim was born in Seoul, South Korea. After placing third in the International Violin Competition Henri Marteau in 2011, she won the Ishikawa Music Award in Japan in 2012 as well as the Concerto Competition at the International Great Mountains Music Festival in Korea. In 2013, she won first prize at the International Eurasia Music Competition in Japan as well as the MIMC prize at the International Violin Competition of Indianapolis, where she was additionally awarded the special Mozart Prize.

Lim has performed in the United States, Canada, Japan, Korea, Germany and Switzerland, in addition to Belgium, with, among others, Maxim Vengerov and Joell Smirnoff. In 2015 she debuted with the Carmel Symphony Orchestra in Indianapolis.

== Musical career ==
As well as winning the Queen Elisabeth Competition in 2015, Lim has performed with various orchestras in the world including Orchestre Philharmonique de Liège, Brussels Philharmonic, Royal Philharmonic Orchestra, Munich Chamber Orchestra, Wuhan Symphony Orchestra, NHK Symphony Orchestra, Philharmonic Orchestra of Minas Gerais, L’Orchestra National Du Capitole de Toulouse, Taipei Symphony Orchestra, Poznań Philharmonic Orchestra, Symphonic Orchestra of the Mariinsky Theatre, Philharmonie Luxembourg, Seoul Philharmonic Orchestra, Nagoya Philharmonic Orchestra, KBS Symphony Orchestra amongst others.

She also performed with many renowned conductors and musicians including Andras Schiff, Gidon Kremer, Alexander Shelley, David Zinman, Tugan Sokhiev, and Alexander Lazarev. She uses Stradivarius 1708 Violin “Huggins” from The Queen Elisabeth International Music Competition as a loan for four years.
