= Egon Sassmannshaus =

German musician

Egon Sassmannshaus (19 March 1928, in Wuppertal – 7 August 2010, in Munich) was a violinist and string pedagogue.

His Early Start on the Violin was first published in German in 1976, followed by three more volumes, and is widely used. The work has been translated into Italian, Chinese, and (in 2008) into English; adaptations for viola and cellos have also been published. Sassmannshaus grew up in Wuppertal and was largely self-taught on the violin. In the late 1940s he briefly had lessons with the German-American virtuoso Walter Schulze-Priska. He soon started teaching himself, and by the early 1950 he had enough pupils to make a living, and although he took up a more secure position of assistant principal violist in Würzburg in 1958, he continued to give private lessons. In 1976 he became the head of the municipal music school in Würzburg. His teaching methods became known through presentations at national or European conferences in the late 1960s and early 1970s, resulting in the publication of his handwritten materials.

Sassmannshaus taught children from the ages four to six at a time when starting at ten was still considered normal. Unlike Shinichi Suzuki (founder of the Suzuki Method), he introduced note-reading early, using a large-print format. To teach pitch and rhythm he used familiar folk songs and texts, and often the same song recurs later to teach a new finger pattern or position. Particularly innovative was the early introduction of shifting and playing in positions. The large print, illustrations and familiar songs made the violin books more approachable than most others, while at the same time the method introduced at an early stage technique usually considered as quite advanced. Previously available only in German, these books were edited and translated into English by his son, Kurt Sassmannshaus, a violin pedagogue now working in America.

== Sources ==
- Sassmannshaus, K. (September 2008). "Songs of My Father". The Strad (119): 63-64.
