= Hu Nai-yuan =

Taiwanese violinist

- 胡乃元
- Born: 1961 (age 63–64); Tainan, Taiwan
- Occupation: Classical violinist
- Years active: 1985 - present

Hu Nai-yuan (Chinese: 胡乃元; pinyin: Hú Nǎiyuán; Pe̍h-ōe-jī: Hô͘ Nái-gôan, born 1961 at Tainan, Taiwan) is a Taiwanese violinist. He was the first prize winner in the 1985 Queen Elisabeth Music Competition.

== Life and career ==
Hu Nai-yuan started to study the violin at the age of 5. By the age of 8, he performed as soloist with the National Youth Orchestra of Taiwan. He came to the United States in 1972 to continue his studies, first with Broadus Erle and Joseph Silverstein. He studied with Josef Gingold at Indiana University and also served as Gingold's assistant after graduation. He is considered one of Mr. Gingold's best students.

Since winning the First Prize of the prestigious Queen Elisabeth Competition in 1985, Hu Nai-Yuan has appeared on many of the world's stages, including the Concertgebouw in Amsterdam, Avery Fisher Hall in New York City and major venues in London, Paris, Brussels, Munich, and other cities in Europe, North and South Americas and Asia. In praise of his playing, BBC Music Magazine wrote, “Taiwanese violinist Nai-Yuan Hu is an awesomely capable performer whose technical facility, musical intelligence and unfaltering verve place him among the higher echelons of today’s string virtuosi.”

He plays the Ex-Hubay Stradivarius.

He was featured as a violinist in the 2001 film Kate & Leopold starring Meg Ryan and Hugh Jackman.

== Awards ==
- 1985: First Prize in Queen Elisabeth Competition

== Recordings ==
Nai-Yuan has recorded the Goldmark Violin Concerto and Bruch Violin Concerto #2.
