= Lucie Robert =

Canadian musician

Lucie Robert is a Canadian-American violinist, composer, and college professor.

== Personal life and career ==
Robert was born in Montreal. When Robert was five years old, she taught her older sister how to play the violin. Robert was the youngest musician at the Conservatoire de Montréal when she was 11 or 12 years old. She attended Indiana University Bloomington when she was 18 years old to study with the well known violinist Josef Gingold at the Jacobs School of Music. During the last three years of her nine year stay in Bloomington, she was Gingold's assistant. At 26 years old, Robert became a teacher at the Manhattan School of Music where she has taught at for over 20 years. Robert has also held a teaching position at Mannes School of Music. She has played the violin for National Public Radio, the CBC Radio, Radio Canada, and Radio France.
