= Yonty Solomon =

South African pianist

Jonathan "Yonty" Solomon (6 May 1937 – 26 September 2008) was a South African pianist. He played with many of the world's best-known orchestras.

== Biography ==
Solomon was born in Cape Town, the youngest of seven children of a family from Lithuania. At the age of six he showed an interest in boogie-woogie and jazz. After winning a musical scholarship, and receiving support from Kendall Taylor, he studied at the University of Cape Town, graduating with distinction in both music and psychology.

He continued his studies with Dame Myra Hess, Guido Agosti and Charles Rosen. He won several major piano competitions, including the Harriet Cohen Beethoven Medal. He made his Wigmore Hall debut in London in 1963 with Bach's Goldberg Variations—which became his "calling card"—and Chopin's 24 Preludes. Shortly after this, he accompanied Mstislav Rostropovich in recital. He played duo recitals with many other leading musicians throughout his career.

While Solomon was renowned for his interpretations of the music of Debussy, Ravel, Albéniz, Granados, Janáček and Chopin, his repertoire extended from Bach and Beethoven through to contemporary composers. He gave the first performance of Richard Rodney Bennett's Five Studies (1964), Wilfred Josephs's Piano Studies and his Piano Concerto (both 1967) and Usko Merilaainen's Piano Sonata No. 2 (1967).

He was the first pianist in recent years to receive permission from Kaikhosru Shapurji Sorabji to perform and record his music. In 1976, he played several of Sorabji's pieces in London. His recital featuring three of Sorabji's 100 Transcendental Studies (1940–44) at the Wigmore Hall in 1980 was praised for its "effortless handling of explosive textures" and "brilliance without sacrifice". He recorded Sorabji's Le jardin parfumé.

In 1990, he formed the Solomon Trio with the violinist Rodney Friend and the cellist Timothy Hugh. Between 1990 and 1994, they performed in Milan, Geneva, Birmingham, and London, as well as in Germany and Spain. They made a recording for Pickwick of the Tchaikovsky and Arensky piano trios. He also recorded for Decca, Philips, Altarus Records, Carlton, BBC, and other labels.

Solomon worked as musical advisor on television and several films. He gave 300 hours of tuition to Navin Chowdhry to mime playing a musical prodigy in Madame Sousatzka (1988). His playing of works by Chopin, Schumann, Brahms, Schubert, and his own "Beethoven to Boogie" could also be heard in the film. He coached Hugh Grant in Impromptu (1991), in which Grant portrayed Frédéric Chopin.

He was a Fellow of the Royal College of Music, where he was Professor of Piano. He was also a professor at Trinity College of Music and President of the Alkan Society.

He gave charity concerts, including ones for Jewish charities. In January 2008, he was diagnosed with a brain tumour, and he died in London in September. He was survived by his partner, Rowan Meyer.

== Sources ==
- The Sorabji Archive
- Guardian obituary
- Telegraph obit
- The JC.com
