= Lincoln Trio =

The Lincoln Trio is a Chicago-based piano trio formed in 2003 consisting of pianist Marta Aznavoorian, violinist Desirée Ruhstrat, and cellist David Cunliffe. The trio take their name from the state where they are based, the Land of Lincoln, Illinois. They originated at the Music Institute of Chicago.

The Lincoln Trio's appearances in the US include Carnegie Hall, Alice Tully Hall, Ravinia Festival, Poisson Rouge, LOCMA and in Springfield, Illinois, where their tour on behalf of the Ravinia Festival culminated in the celebration of the Abraham Lincoln Bicentennial with President Barack Obama. They have also toured throughout Asia, Colombia and Germany and recorded extensively for the Cedille Record label and on Naxos garnering a 2014 Grammy Award nomination for their work on James Whitbourn's Annelies.

The Lincoln Trio received the 2011 Young Performers Career Advancement Award and won the 2008 Master Players International Competition in Venice, Italy and are currently in residence at the Merit School of Music in Chicago, Illinois.
