= Kyoko Takezawa =

Japanese violinist (born 1966)

- Born: Takezawa Kyōko; 1966 (age 59–60); Japan Ōbu, Aichi
- Genre: Classical
- Occupation: violinist
- Instrument: Violin
- Years active: 1986 to present

Kyoko Takezawa (竹澤 恭子, Takezawa Kyōko) is a prominent Japanese-born violinist. She has recorded for the RCA Victor Red Seal label.

Born in Ōbu, Aichi in 1966, she started her training in Japan as a part of the Suzuki Method program and was part of a tour of the United States. She is a graduate of the Juilliard School (1989) where her teacher was Dorothy DeLay. Ms. Takezawa won the gold medal in 1986, and subsequently served as a judge for the International Violin Competition of Indianapolis.

She played on the Stradivarius loaned to her by the Nippon Music Foundation until it was sold at auction in 2006 for US$3,544,000.

== Discography ==
- Tchaikovsky / Prokofiev / Violin Concertos (LaserDisc)

Kyoko Takezawa, violin
Moscow Radio Symphony Orchestra, Conducted by Vladimir Fedoseyev
RCA Victor Red Seal

- Concerto! / Bartók Violin Concerto No. 2 (DVD)

Kyoko Takezawa, violin
London Symphony Orchestra, Conducted by Michael Tilson Thomas
Interviewer: Dudley Moore
RCA Victor Red Seal

- Violin for Relaxation

Various Artists
RCA Victor Red Seal

- Bartók / Brahms / Chaminade / Falla / Tchaikovsky

Kyoko Takezawa, violin
Pillip Moll, piano
RCA Victor Red Seal

- Saint-Saëns / Debussy / Ravel / French Violin Sonatas

Kyoko Takezawa, violin
Rohan de Silva, piano
RCA Victor Red Seal

- Tchaikovsky / Prokofiev / Violin Concertos

Kyoko Takezawa, violin
Moscow Radio Symphony Orchestra, Conducted by Vladimir Fedoseyev
RCA Victor Red Seal

- Mendelssohn Violin Concertos

Kyoko Takezawa, violin
Bamberg Symphony, Conducted by Claus Peter Flor
RCA Victor Red Seal

- Elgar Violin Concerto

Kyoko Takezawa, violin
Bavarian Radio Symphony Orchestra, Conducted by Sir Colin Davis
RCA Victor Red Seal

- Bartók Violin Concerto No. 2

Kyoko Takezawa, violin
London Symphony Orchestra, Conducted by Michael Tilson Thomas
RCA Victor Red Seal

- Barber Concerto for Violin Op. 14, Concerto for Cello in A minor

Kyoko Takezawa, violin
Steven Isserlis, cello
St. Louis Symphony Orchestra, Conducted by Leonard Slatkin
Jacob Berg, Peter Bowman, Susan Slaughter
RCA Victor Red Seal

- Aria on the Strings

Tarō Iwashiro and Kyoko Takezawa
BMG Fan House (Japan)

- Romanza

Kyoko Takezawa, violin
Akira Eguchi, piano
BMG Fan House (Japan)

== General references ==
- "Kyoko Takezawa official web site". kyokotakezawa.com. Archived from the original on 14 March 2022.
