= David Chan =

American violinist and conductor (b. 1973)

- 詹曉昀
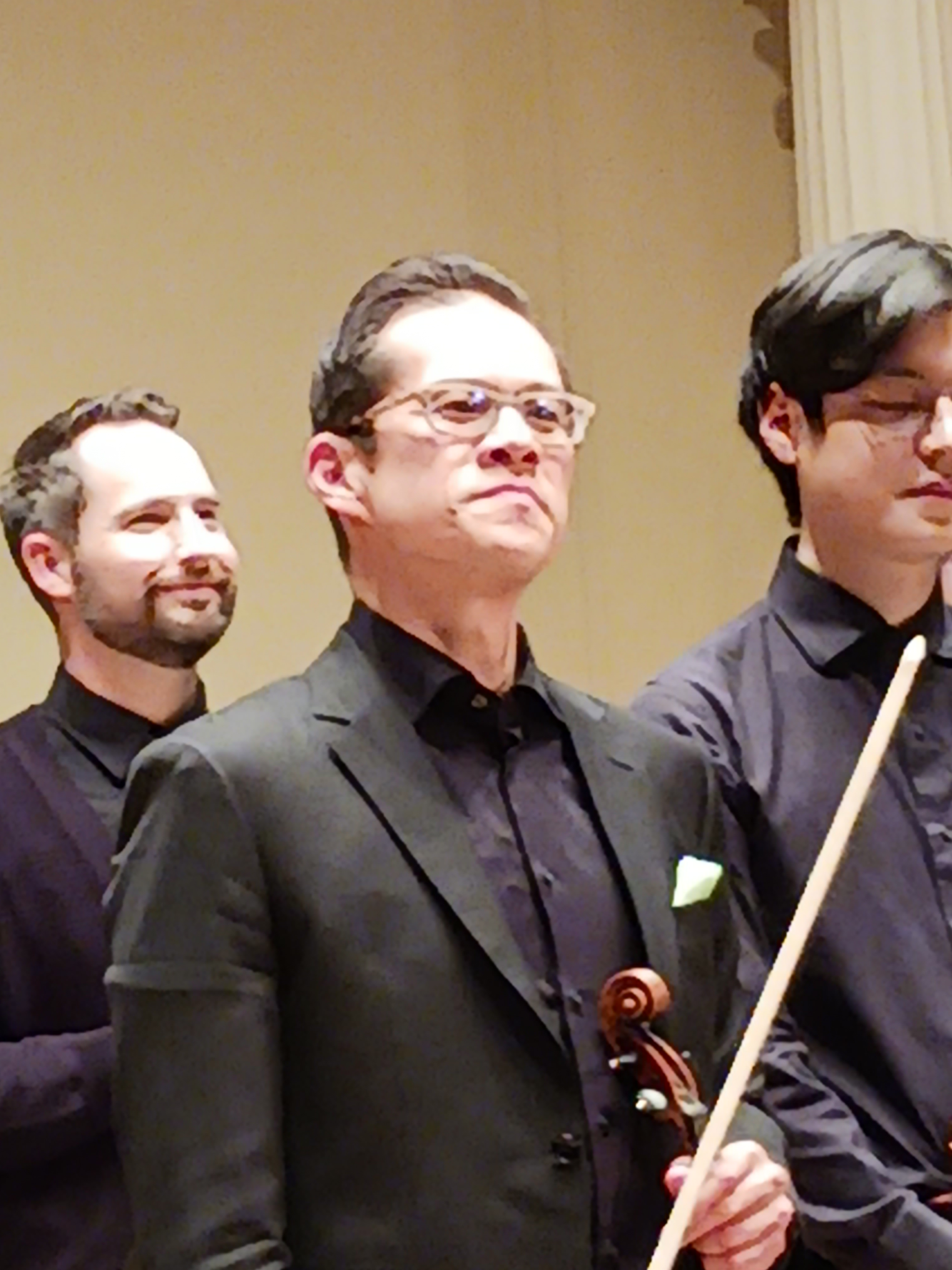
- Chan with the Met Orchestra Chamber Ensemble, receiving the applause after a performance of Mahler's Das Lied von der Erde at Weill Hall (Carnegie Hall) in New York City, April 28, 2025
- Born: May 5, 1973 (age 53)
- Education: Harvard University (BA); Juilliard School (MFA)
- Occupations: Violinist; conductor
- Years active: 1995–Present
- Website: davidchanmusic.com

David Chan is an American violinist, conductor, and a concertmaster of the Metropolitan Opera Orchestra. He is one of the most sought-after violinists of his generation. He is a prizewinner at the International Tchaikovsky Competition, the International Violin Competition of Indianapolis, among many others. As a conductor, Chan is praised for his deep understanding of the music and interpretive depth.

It was announced in April 2025 that Chan will be leaving the Met to become professor of violin at Rice University.

== Early life and education ==
Chan was born to a Taiwanese American family in San Diego, California. His parents, both Taiwanese immigrants, met as graduate students at Stanford University.

Chan began his musical education at age 3, when his parents enrolled him in a violin class. At age 14, he won the San Diego Symphony's Young Arts Concerto Competition, which enabled him to appear with the orchestra in two series of concerts. He was also the featured soloist with the San Diego Youth Symphony on their tour of Austria, Germany, Hungary and the former Czechoslovakia.

After high school, Chan graduated from Harvard University with a Bachelor of Arts in music and earned a master's degree from the Juilliard School in 1997, where he is currently on the faculty. His principal teachers were Dorothy DeLay, Hyo Kang and Michael Tseitlin. He won the 5th prize at the International Tchaikovsky Competition, and the third place bronze medal (with $10,000) and Josef Gingold Prize at the International Violin Competition of Indianapolis.

== Career ==
He made his New York debut in on October 2, 1995, playing Paganini's Concerto no. 2 with the Juilliard orchestra led by Hugh Wolff.

He has performed throughout the United States, Europe, and the Far East, appearing as soloist with such orchestras as the Moscow State Symphony Orchestra, the Los Angeles Philharmonic, the National Symphony Orchestra of Taiwan, the Aspen Chamber Symphony, the San Diego Symphony, Indianapolis Symphony Orchestra, the Richmond Symphony Orchestra, Springfield Symphony Orchestra, and the Northbrook Symphony Orchestra. He has released two recordings: a recital album and a disc of two Paganini concertos with the English Chamber Orchestra, both for the Ambassador label.

He became one of the Metropolitan Opera's concertmasters in 2000. On February 2, 2003, the occasion of a Met Orchestra performance, he made his Carnegie Hall solo debut playing Brahms's Concerto for Violin, Cello and Orchestra with Met colleague cellist Rafael Figueroa. He was the soloist in Sofia Gubaidulina's In Tempus Praesens (concerto for violin and orchestra) with the Met Orchestra in 2012. For Handel's Giulio Cesare, Chan appeared onstage in costume during one of David Daniels' arias to supply the obbligato violin part.

He has been a frequent guest at Japan's Pacific Music Festival, the Taipei Music Academy and Festival, the Seattle Chamber Music Festival, and La Jolla's SummerFest. He has also played chamber music with Lang Lang in a "Lang Lang With Friends" concert.

With the Met Chamber Ensemble, he has played in Alban Berg's Chamber Concerto for Piano and Violin with 13 Wind Instruments, Richard Strauss's Le Bourgeois Gentilhomme suite, Olivier Messiaen's Quatuor pour la fin du temps and other works, classical and contemporary.

He joined the faculty of the Juilliard School in 2005. He is head of the Orchestral Performance Program at the Manhattan School of Music and has previously served as a faculty member at the Mannes School of Music.

He can be heard on the soundtrack of the films Teeth and The Caller.

In the fall of 2025 he will be on sabbatical from the Met, moving to Houston and taking up the position of professor of violin at Rice University while winding down his duties at Juilliard and the Manhattan School of Music.

== Conducting ==
Chan has served as music director of the APEX Ensemble and as music director of Camerata Notturna chamber orchestra.

== Wine ==
After marrying his wife, violinist and Met colleague Catherine Ro, his father-in-law gave him a box of good wine. Once he joined the Met Orchestra, he befriended colleagues who were wine connoisseurs. His budding interest led to an obsession with Burgundy wine, to the point where he knew almost every vineyard on the Côte-d'Or.

His interest in wine led him to meet with Bernard Hervet, former chief executive of Maison Faiveley, and Aubert de Villaine of Domaine de la Romanee-Conti. Their meeting resulted in the founding of the festival Musique et Vin au Clos Vougeot in the Burgundy region of France, of which Chan is the music director.

== Personal life ==
Chan and his wife, violinist Catherine Ro, live in the New York area. They have three children.

== Discography ==
- David Chan: La Campanella
- Beethoven: Violin Concerto (Park Avenue Chamber Symphony, David Bernard, conductor)
- Great Duos For Violin And Cello (with Rafael Figueroa, cellist)
