= Hammer Stradivarius =

Antique violin made by Antonio Stradivari

The Hammer Stradivarius is an antique violin made by Italian luthier Antonio Stradivari (1644–1737) of Cremona. The back measures 36 cm, bearing the label inside: "Antonius Stradivarius Cremonensis/Faciebat Anno 1707". Dating from 1707, it was made during Stradivari's 'golden' period.

It is named after Christian Hammer, a 19th-century Swedish collector who is its first recorded owner. The violin made its way to the United States in 1911 with violinist and teacher Bernard Sinsheimer. In 1992, it was acquired by a Japanese oil company in an estate sale. The Hammer was on loan to violinist Kyoko Takezawa, who performed with it for the next twelve years.

On 16 May 2006, The Hammer made news when it was sold at Christie's auction to an anonymous bidder for US$3.54 million, with a pre-auction estimated value of US$1.5 million to 2.5 million.

== See also ==
- Stradivarius
