= Malcolm Lowe =

Canadian-American violinist and concertmaster

Malcolm Lowe (born March 15, 1953) is a Canadian and American violinist and teacher. He held the Charles Munch chair as concertmaster of the Boston Symphony Orchestra from 1984 to 2019, making him the second-longest-serving concertmaster in the orchestra's history.

== Early life ==
Lowe was raised on a farm in Hamiota, Manitoba, Canada, with his mother being a singer and his father a violinist who commenced his violin training at the age of three. His brothers, Darren and Cameron, also pursued musical careers, with Darren becoming the concertmaster of the Quebec Symphony Orchestra and Cameron serving as a cellist with the Regina Symphony Orchestra.

After relocating to Saskatchewan and settling in Regina at the age of nine, he commenced his music education at the Regina Conservatory of Music, where he studied for nine years under the mentorship of Howard Leyton-Brown, a former concertmaster of the London Philharmonic. He furthered his musical training at the Meadowmount School of Music from 1970 to 1973 and the Curtis Institute of Music from 1971, receiving instruction from Ivan Galamian, Josef Gingold, Jaime Laredo and Sally Thomas.

== Career ==
In 1972, Lowe won the CBC Talent Contest. Subsequently, in 1973, he served as the concertmaster at the New York Christmas String Seminar. In the subsequent year, 1974, he performed in Puerto Rico as a member of the Casals Festival Orchestra.

In 1975, he was appointed as the concertmaster of the Regina Symphony Orchestra, a position he held until 1976. In the subsequent year, he took on the position of concertmaster with the Quebec Symphony Orchestra, a role he held until 1983. During his tenure with the Quebec Symphony Orchestra, he won the Montreal International Violin Competition.

In 1983, he became a member of the Worcester Symphony Orchestra in Massachusetts. By 1984, he was appointed under the music directorship of Seiji Ozawa as the concertmaster of the Boston Symphony Orchestra, a position held by the 10th individual since the orchestra's inception in 1881.

On September 12, 2019, the Boston Symphony Orchestra announced his retirement. He had taken a leave from the ensemble in February of that year due to the effects of a concussion he sustained after falling and hitting his head while attempting to avoid a cyclist.

"Malcolm Lowe's 35-year tenure as concertmaster of the Boston Symphony Orchestra exemplifies an exceptional dedication and commitment to achieving excellence at the pinnacle of music-making," remarked Boston Symphony Music Director Andris Nelsons.

Lowe performs with the Boston Symphony Chamber Players and serves as a soloist for the orchestra, appearing at both Symphony Hall and Tanglewood. In the summer of 1990, he served as concertmaster at Tanglewood during Leonard Bernstein's final career concert. He was invited as a guest musician to perform with various orchestras, including the Montreal Symphony Orchestra, the National Arts Centre Orchestra, the Scotia Festival of Music, and the Toronto Symphony Orchestra.

Lowe performed on a 1699 Antonio Stradivari violin known as the 'Lafont.'

== Teaching ==
In music education, Lowe holds positions in the New England Conservatory of Music, the Cleveland Institute of Music, Boston University, and the Tanglewood Music Center.

He served as a member of the jury for the International Violin Competition of Indianapolis in 1998, 2002, and 2006, as well as a member of the jury for the 2023 Montreal International Music Competition.

== See also ==
- Richard Burgin, concertmaster of the BSO from 1920 to 1962
- Joseph Silverstein, concertmaster of the BSO from 1962 to 1984
