= Josef Gingold =

American violinist (1909–1995)

Josef Gingold Иосиф Гингольд
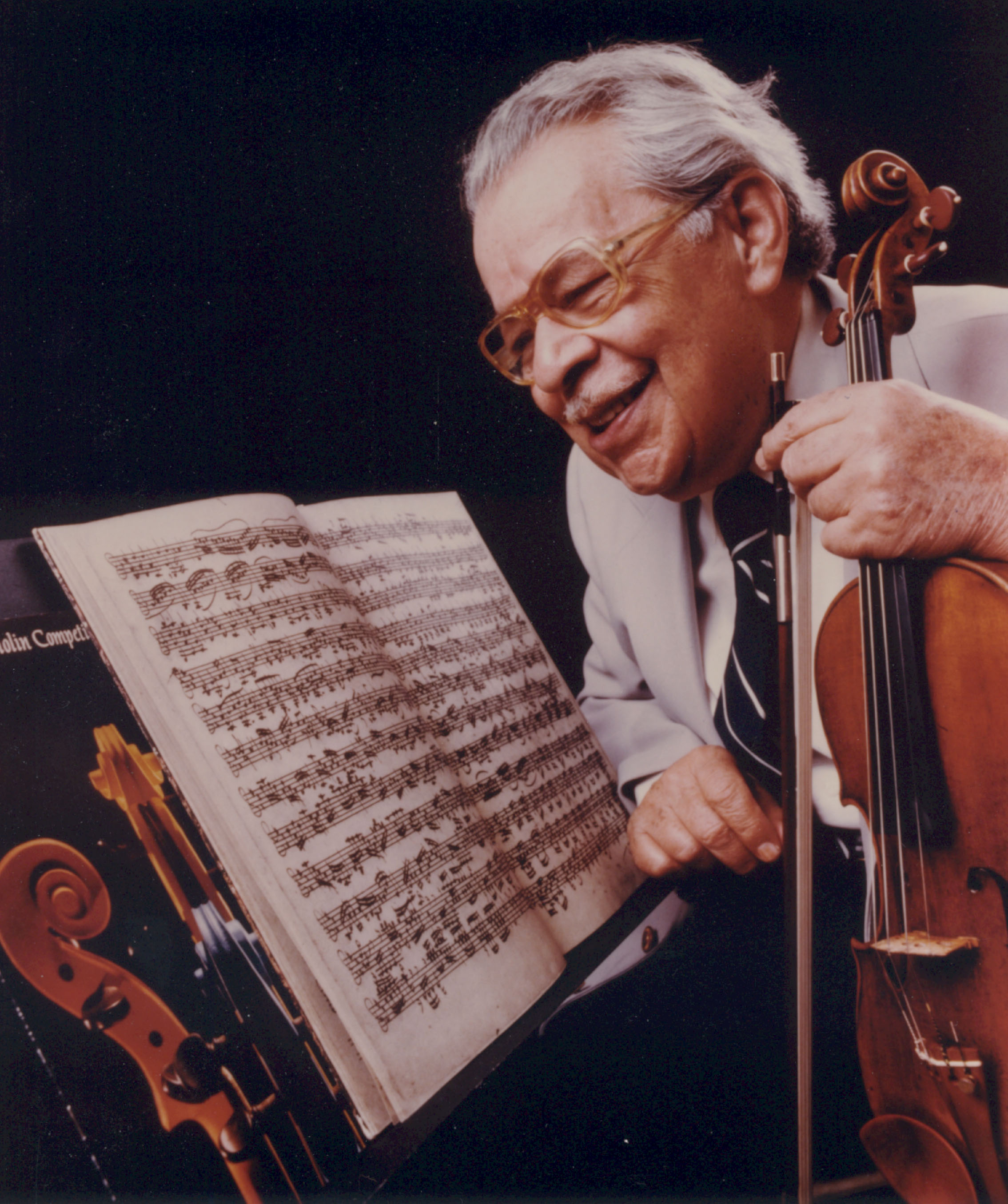

Background information
- Born: October 28, 1909; Brest-Litovsk, Grodno Governorate, Russian Empire
- Died: January 11, 1995 (aged 85) Bloomington, Indiana, US
- Occupations: Concertmaster (Detroit Symphony Orchestra and Cleveland Orchestra); Professor (Indiana University Jacobs School of Music)
- Instrument: Violin

Josef Gingold (Russian: Иосиф Меерович Гингольд, romanized: Iosif Meyerovich Gingol'd; October 28 [O.S. October 15], 1909 – January 11, 1995) was an American classical violinist and teacher who lived most of his life in the United States. At the time of his death he was considered one of the most influential violin masters in the United States, with many successful students.

== Early life ==
Gingold was born on October 28, 1909, to a Russian-Jewish family in Brest-Litovsk, then part of Grodno Governorate in the Russian Empire (now Brest, Belarus). In 1920, he emigrated to the United States, where he studied violin with Vladimir Graffman in New York City. He then moved to Belgium for several years to study with master violinist Eugène Ysaÿe. Gingold wrote about his experience for The Strad magazine. He gave the first performance of Ysaÿe's 3rd Sonata for Solo Violin.

== Career ==
=== Performance ===
In 1937, Gingold won a spot in the NBC Symphony Orchestra, based in Carnegie Hall in New York City with Arturo Toscanini as its conductor. He gave an extensive interview and story about Toscanini. While at the NBC Orchestra, he was a founding member of its associated chamber ensembles. One was the Primrose String Quartet, with first violinist Oscar Shumsky, violist William Primrose, cellist Harvey Shapiro. He also was in the NBC Trio with Shapiro and pianist Earl Wild).

He later joined the Detroit Symphony Orchestra as the concertmaster and occasional soloist. In 1947 he moved to the Cleveland Orchestra as concertmaster under conductor George Szell. He spent thirteen years in that position. Gingold was interviewed about his relationship and experience working with Szell.

=== Teaching ===
Gingold taught at the Indiana University Jacobs School of Music for more than thirty years, until his death in 1995. His pupils included Gil Shaham, Joshua Bell, Christoph Poppen, Sally O'Reilly, Desirée Ruhstrat, Arnold Steinhardt (who wrote about Gingold for the Strad Magazine), Dylana Jenson, Martin Beaver, Shony Alex Braun, Andrés Cárdenes, Corey Cerovsek, Cyrus Forough, Miriam Fried, Philippe Graffin, Endre Granat, Ulf Hoelscher, Hu Nai-yuan, Jacques Israelievitch, Leonidas Kavakos, Chin Kim, Salvatore Greco, Malcolm Lowe, Jaime Laredo, William Preucil, Joseph Silverstein, Lucie Robert, Tamara Ringas, and Gwen Thompson (who wrote about him in the Strad Magazine).

Gingold was associated with another prominent American violin pedagogue, Ivan Galamian, and joined him to teach at the Meadowmount School. He also edited numerous violin technique books and orchestral excerpt collections, such as Orchestral Excerpts from the Symphonic Repertoire, volume 1-3.

=== Professional associations ===
Gingold was a founder of the quadrennial Indianapolis Violin Competition. He was a National Patron of Delta Omicron, an international professional music fraternity.

== Personal life ==
He married Gladys Anderson 1932; she died in 1978. Gingold died in Bloomington, Indiana, on January 11, 1995, at the age of 85. He was survived by his son, George, and two grandchildren.

== Honors and awards ==
Gingold's recording of Fritz Kreisler's works was nominated for a Grammy Award. Some of the numerous honors he received during his lifetime include the American String Teachers Association Teacher of the Year. He received the Fredrick Bachman Lieber Award for Distinguished Teaching at Indiana University and in 1980 he was named Distinguished Professor Emeritus at Indiana University.

In 1984, he received the Chamber Music America Richard J. Bogomolny National Service Award. In 1993, Gingold received Baylor University's Robert Foster Cherry Award for Great Teachers and he also was granted the American Symphony Orchestra League's Golden Baton Award.

== Discography ==
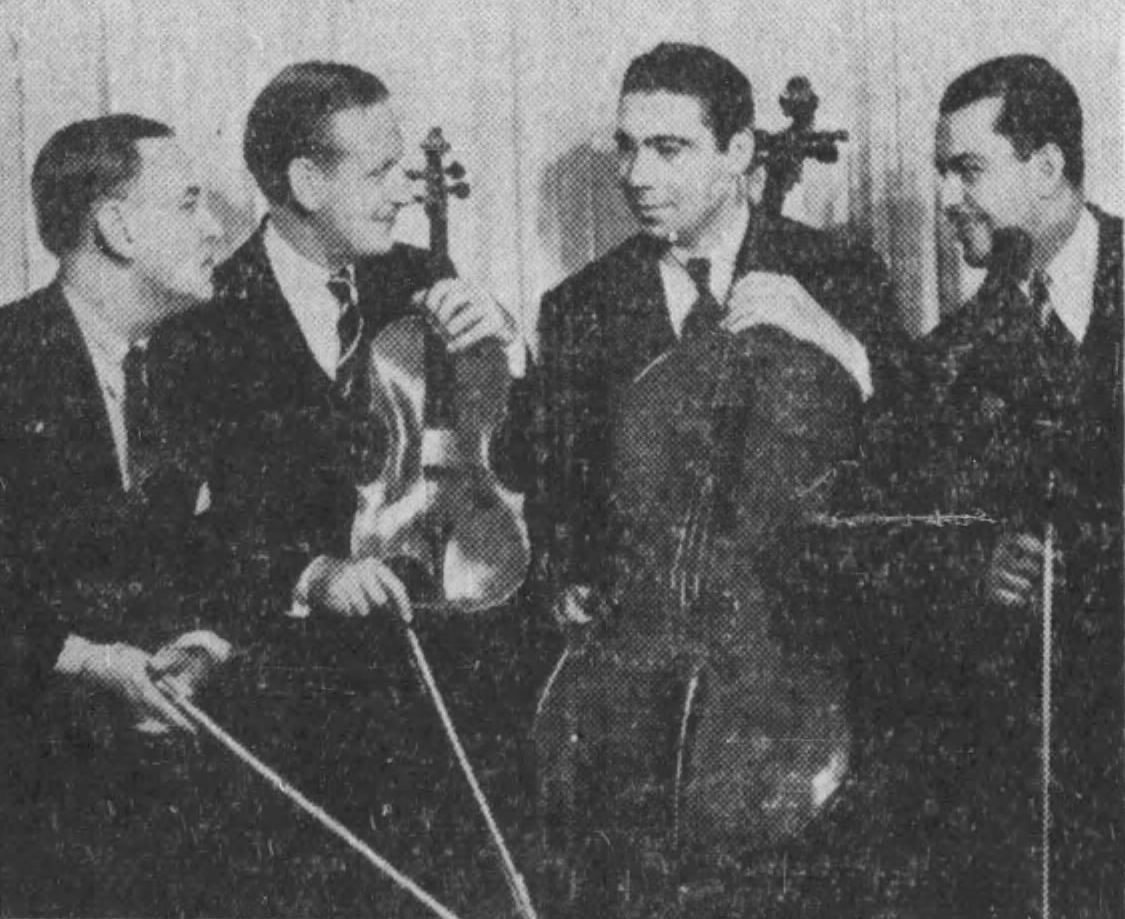
Gingold (far right) with the Primrose Quartet, 1943

The discography of Josef Gingold is limited.

- The Primrose Quartet CD (Biddulph Recordings LAB052-53) reissue of the 1940-1941 78 rpm recordings, with Josef Gingold, Oscar Shumsky, violinist; William Primrose, violist; Harvey Shapiro, cellist and Jesús María Sanromá, pianist, of Toscanini's NBC Symphony Orchestra, performing works of Haydn, Schumann, Brahms, Smetana, and Tchaikovsky.
- "Joseph Gingold Seventy-five", recordings from 1942–1968, including Walton's Sonata for VIolin and Piano, 1984 vinyl LP (Red Bud RB-1017).
- Josef Gingold Plays Fritz Kreisler, a 1976 vinyl LP record.
- Starker Plays Kodály : Gingold's 1973 recording of Duo by Zoltán Kodály with cellist Janos Starker, originally released on the LP (Fidelio F-003). In 1992 it was reissued on the CD Starker Plays Kodaly, and in 2007 on SACD (TM-SACD 9002.2) and on vinyl LP by Hong Kong label TopMusic International.
- Schubert's Sonatina in A minor, D385, and Liszt's Rapsodie Espagnole, with Gyorgy Sebok (piano) on LP (IND-722, Indiana University School of Music).
- Schubert's Duo Sonata in A major, D.574 with pianist Robert Walter (available on YouTube)
- Schubert's Fantasia in C major, D.934 with pianist György Sebök (available on YouTube) (listed elsewhere for this performance, incorrectly, as with pianist Robert Walter)
- The Art of Josef Gingold, a transfer to CD of the 1976 recording and a 1966 recording , by Music and Arts in 1989, and reissued in 2007 by Pristine Classical. This included Sonata in A, op.13 by Gabriel Fauré and Fritz Kreisler short pieces
- The Artistry of Josef Gingold, a two-CD set on Enharmonic ENCD03-015 contains otherwise unavailable performances of music by Bloch, Arensky, Beethoven (a live recording of the Violin Concerto from Ohio State), Francaix, Mozart, Schubert, Tchaikovsky and Ysaye.
