= Paul Kantor (musician) =

American violin teacher (born 1955)

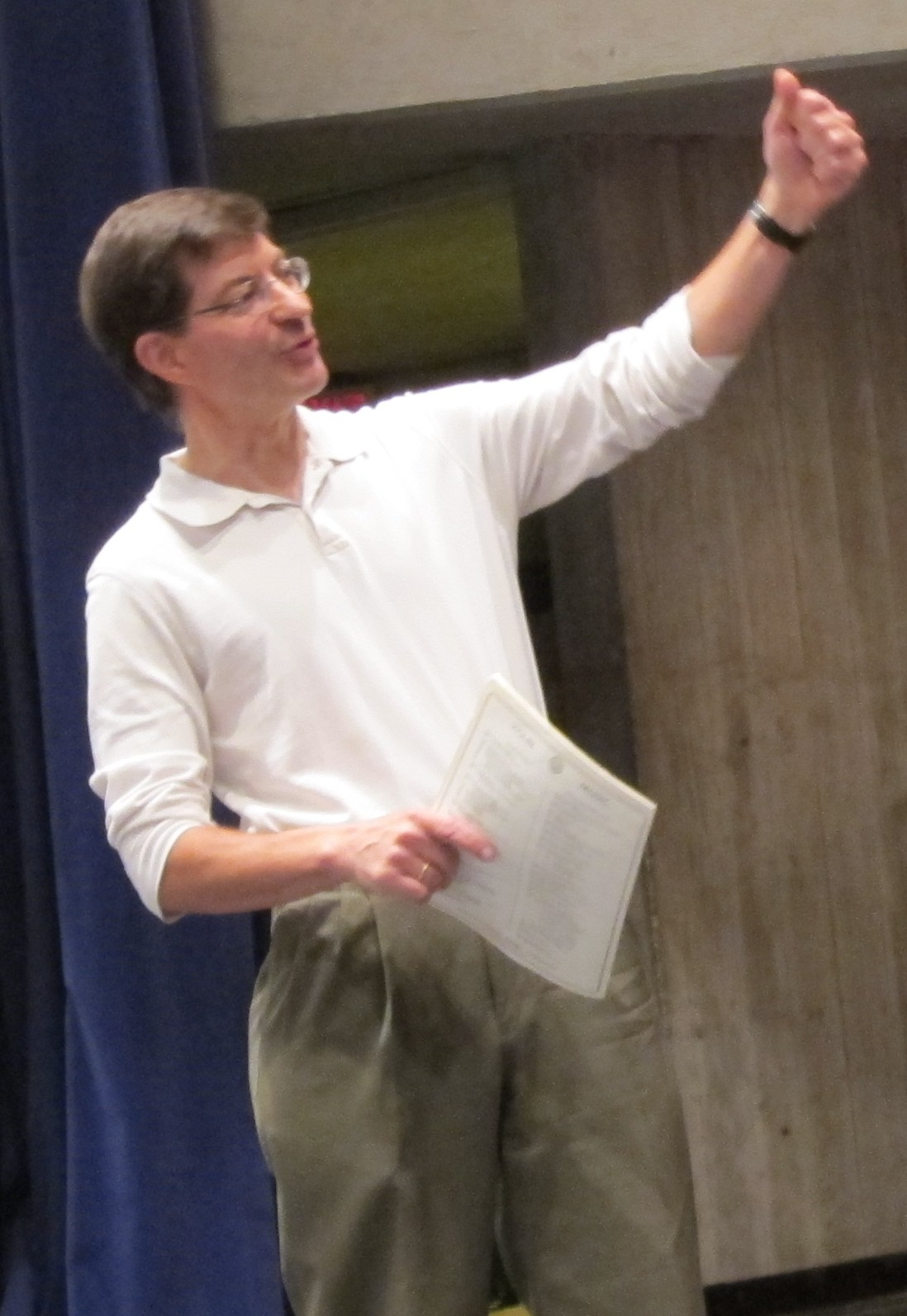
- Paul Kantor giving a masterclass in 2011

Background information
- Born: November 29, 1955 (age 70)
- Genres: Classical
- Occupations: Professor, performer
- Instrument: Violin

Paul Kantor (born November 29, 1955) is an American violin teacher. Kantor is a professor at the Shepherd School of Music at Rice University. He continues the pedagogical lineage of Dorothy DeLay. He is often selected to participate as a jury member for international violin competitions.

== Biography ==
Kantor is currently the Sally Shepherd Perkins Professor of violin at the Shepherd School of Music at Rice University, having previously served as the Eleanor H. Biggs Memorial Distinguished Professor of Violin at the Cleveland Institute of Music. He received Bachelor of Music and Master of Music degrees from the Juilliard School, studying violin with Dorothy DeLay and chamber music with Robert Mann. He served as chair of the string department at the University of Michigan for 13 years and has served on the faculties of the Juilliard School, the New England Conservatory and Yale University. He was appointed as artist-in-residence of The Glenn Gould School/ Royal Conservatory of Music and has been on its faculty since 2008. In addition, he has presented master classes at institutions including Indiana University, Eastman School of Music, and the New World Symphony Orchestra, among others. His students have consistently won major awards at international competitions including the Klein Competition, Fischoff Competition, Stulberg International String Competition, International Violin Competition of Indianapolis, and the Montreal International Violin Competition, among others.

For the past 30 years, he has been an artist and faculty member of the Aspen Music Festival and School, where he was concertmaster of both the Festival Orchestra and Chamber Symphony. He also serves on the faculty of the Meadowmount School of Music. Kantor has performed as a soloist with numerous symphony orchestras and has performed with the New York String Quartet, the Berkshire Chamber Players, the Lenox Quartet, and the National Musical Arts Chamber Ensemble. He served as concertmaster of the New Haven Symphony for 10 years, and the Aspen Chamber Symphony for 10 years, as well as the Lausanne Chamber Orchestra, and Great Lakes Festival Orchestra. He was appointed as guest concertmaster of the New Japan Philharmonic and the Toledo Symphony Orchestra.

He has performed the world premieres of Dan Welcher's Violin Concerto and John Corigliano's Red Violin Caprices. His recordings are on the Equilibrium, CRI, Delos and Mark Records.
