= Marta Aznavoorian =

- Born: Marta Aznavoorian
- Occupation: Pianist
- Instrument: Piano
- Website: https://www.martaaznavoorian.com

Marta Aznavoorian is a Chicago native and Armenian-American pianist.

== Career ==
At 13, Aznavoorian made her professional debut when Sir George Solti invited her to perform Mozart's Piano Concerto No. 24 in C minor with the Chicago Symphony Orchestra at Symphony Center. She studied with Menahem Pressler at Indiana University for her bachelor’s degree and was awarded an artist diploma. Aznavoorian received her master’s degree from New England Conservatory where she studied with Patricia Zander.

As a founding member of the Lincoln Trio, Aznavoorian frequently tours. The trio has a discography including Trios From Our Homelands, the complete works for multiple strings and piano by Joaquin Turina and their debut album, Notable Women. In 2017, Trios from our Homelands, recorded on Cedille Records was nominated for best small ensemble/chamber music performance at the 59th Annual GRAMMY Awards. In 2021, the trio released Trios from the City of Big Shoulders featuring works by Chicago composers Leo Sowerby and Ernst Bacon. The following year, they released a CD highlighting contemporary Chicago composers, titled Chicago Now. The trio’s album Fantasies of Buenos Aires was nominated for Best Classical Album at the 2024 Latin GRAMMY Awards.

Aznavoorian’s duo, The Aznavoorian Duo, is composed of Marta Aznavoorian and her sister, cellist Ani Aznavoorian. In 2022, they released their debut album, Gems from Armenia, featuring Komitas Vartabed, Aram Khachaturian, Arno Babajanian, Avet Terterian and Armenian contemporary composers Serouj Kradjian, Alexander Arutiunian, Vache Sharafyan and Peter Boyer. In 2022, the duo toured the album and its release.

Aznavoorian regularly performs with orchestras and composers. She has appeared as a soloist with orchestras including Sydney Symphony Orchestra, Sydney Conservatory Orchestra, San Angelo Symphony, San Diego Symphony, Highland Park Strings, New Philharmonic and New World Symphony where she was invited by conductor Michael Tilson Thomas. She has performed at festivals such as Tanglewood Music Festival, Aspen Music Festival, Marlboro Festival, Seattle Chamber Music Society, Caramoor Festival, Hornby Island and Green Lake Festival. Additionally, Aznavoorian has performed at Ravinia Festival for multiple years. Aznavoorian has also worked with many composers, including William Bolcom, Osvaldo Golijov, Jennifer Higdon, Shulamit Ran, Augusta Read Thomas, Joan Tower, Lera Auerbach, Pierre Jalbert, Stacy Garrop, Laura Schewendinger, Marta Ptaszynska, Shawn Okpebholo and Peter Boyer.

== Awards ==
Aznavoorian has won awards including the Aspen Music Festival Piano Competition, the Chicago Symphony Orchestra Competition and the Seventeen Magazine/General Motors National Competition. At the Stravinsky International Competition, where she won first prize, she won the special prize for best interpretation of the commissioned contemporary work. Moreover, she was awarded a Level 1 scholarship from the National Foundation for Advancement in the Arts and was named a Presidential Scholar in the Arts. As Presidential Scholar, Aznavoorian was invited to the White House, met President George H. W. Bush and performed at the Kennedy Center in Washington, D.C..

== Outreach and Teaching ==
Aznavoorian is an advocate for outreach, education and philanthropy. She leads a nonprofit organization, Keynote Productions, which funds scholarships to underprivileged students interested in furthering their education in music. In 2017, she was awarded the Standing Ovation Alumni Legend Award for her teaching and mentoring in Chicago. Aznavoorian is a faculty member at DePaul University where she was awarded the Monsignor Kenneth J. Velo Endowed Distinguished Professorship. She is also a faculty member and Artist in Residence at the Music Institute of Chicago.

Aznavoorian is a Steinway Artist and records for Naxos, ARTEC label and Cedille Records.
