= Rodney Friend =

English violinist

Rodney Friend MBE (born in Bradford, 1939) is an English violinist.

Born in Bradford, Friend's father was a local tailor. At the age of 12 he won a scholarship to the Royal Academy of Music after Sir Reginald Thatcher, the then principal of the R.A.M, heard Friend perform for the first time. Friend also studied subsequently at the Royal Manchester College of Music.

At the Royal Academy of Music, Friend studied under the tutelage of Frederick Grinke. He later studied with Endre Wolf, Menuhin and Szeryng.

In 1964 Friend became the youngest ever leader/concertmaster of the London Philharmonic Orchestra, working closely with Bernard Haitink, Barenboim, Solti and Giulini. In 1975, he was invited by the New York Philharmonic Orchestra to be their concertmaster, playing concerts and recording worldwide with Bernstein, Boulez and Mehta.

In 1979, he was a soloist with the Naumburg Orchestral Concerts, in the Naumburg Bandshell, Central Park, in the summer series.

In 1991 he formed the Solomon Trio with whom he toured Europe extensively.

In 2008 the first two volumes of his books The Orchestral Violinist were published.

Friend is at present an artistic director at Cambridge International String Academy at Trinity College, Cambridge. He plays a violin made by Giuseppe Guarneri dated 1696.

He was appointed Member of the Order of the British Empire (MBE) in the 2015 New Year Honours for services to music.

In 2019, he published a workbook, The Violin in 5ths — Developing Intonation and Sound, in which he detailed a teaching method regarding intonation and sound that he has developed and perfected over decades of experience working with many virtuosos including Jascha Heifetz and David Oistrakh.

== In popular culture ==
In 1972 whilst leading the London Philharmonic Orchestra Rodney performed with the orchestra during their recording sessions for the Peddlers' album Suite London released on Philips records.
