= Kurt Sassmannshaus =

Kurt Sassmannshaus is a German violin instructor, primarily at the University of Cincinnati – College-Conservatory of Music and Great Wall International Music Academy.

== Life and career ==
Born in Würzburg, Germany, he is the son of violin pedagogue Egon Sassmannshaus. After receiving his bachelor's degree from Cologne, where he studied with Igor Ozim, Sassmannshaus received a master's degree from the Juilliard School as a scholarship student of Dorothy DeLay, and won first prize in the International Chamber Music Competition in Colmar, France. He taught at the University of Texas, Austin and at Sarah Lawrence College before joining CCM full-time in 1983. He currently holds school's distinguished Dorothy Richard Starling Chair for Classical Violin, a position previously held by the late Dorothy Delay.

Sassmannshaus has taught around the world, including master classes in Europe, the United States, Japan, China, and Australia, and has worked in close association with Dorothy DeLay both in Cincinnati and at the Aspen Music Festival and School. Sassmannshaus's students include prizewinners of major international competitions, prominent soloists and chamber musicians, and orchestra leaders in ensembles such as the London Philharmonic, Cape Town, North German State Radio, Frankfurt Radio, Cincinnati, Pittsburgh, and Cleveland orchestras. His former students also hold faculty positions in European and American conservatories and universities including Lübeck, the University of Michigan, University of Boulder, and the Peabody Conservatory.

In 1987, he founded the Starling Preparatory String Project as an integrated pre-collegiate program for string players. In addition to a subscription concert series and concerto showcases in Cincinnati, the Starling Chamber Orchestra regularly records, commissions new works, and tours internationally. They have appeared throughout Europe, Korea, China, and at New York's Lincoln Center. The orchestra was recently featured on the syndicated Public Radio International show “From the Top,” and has been the subject of feature articles in The New York Times and Washington Post. In 1996, Sassmannshaus expanded the Starling programs and founded “Starling Kids”, a broad based community violin program at CCM and several local schools.
