= Miriam Fried =

Romanian violinist (born 1946)

- מרים פריד
- Born: 9 September 1946 (age 79); Satu Mare, Romania
- Occupations: Classical violinist; Pedagogue

Miriam Fried (Hebrew: מרים פריד; born 9 September 1946) is a Romanian-born Israeli classical violinist and pedagogue.

== Biography ==
Miriam Fried was born in Satu Mare, Romania but moved with her family to Israel when she was aged 2.

Her family settled in Herzliya. Her mother was a piano teacher. Miriam first took up piano lessons, but she began studies at age eight with Alice Fenyves at the Tel Aviv Academy (now the Buchmann-Mehta School of Music at Tel Aviv University). She then spent a year with Alice's brother, Lorand Fenyves, at the Conservatoire de Musique de Genève, and eventually studied with Josef Gingold at Indiana University, Bloomington (under what is now the Jacobs School of Music) and Ivan Galamian at the Juilliard School.

In 1968 she won the Paganini Competition in Genoa and in 1971 the Queen Elisabeth Music Competition in Brussels.

Miriam Fried is the dedicatee and first performer of the Violin Concerto by Donald Erb. Other composers who have written works for her include Ned Rorem and Alexander Boskovich.

She has recorded the complete solo sonatas and partitas of Johann Sebastian Bach, and twice recorded the Sibelius Violin Concerto.

She plays a 1718 Stradivarius believed to have been formerly owned by Louis Spohr, and also by Regina Strinasacchi, for whom Wolfgang Amadeus Mozart wrote his Sonata in B-flat, K. 454.

She has been artistic director and chair of the faculty at the Steans Institute for Young Artists of the Ravinia Festival since 1993. She was a member of the Mendelssohn String Quartet. She is a member of the faculty of the New England Conservatory. She was Professor of Violin at the Jacobs School of Music at Indiana University. Her students include Pekka Kuusisto and Nancy Zhou.

She gives master classes internationally.

She is married to the violinist and violist Paul Biss, the son of the Russian-born cellist Raya Garbousova. Their sons are the pianist Jonathan Biss, with whom she often plays, and Daniel Biss, who is the mayor of Evanston, Illinois.
