= Simone Lamsma =

Dutch violinist

Simone Lamsma (born 9 October 1985, Leeuwarden) is a Dutch violinist.

== Biography ==
Lamsma expressed an interest in playing the violin at age 2, and began her violin studies at age 5. At age 9, she became a student of Davina van Wely. In 1997, Lamsma began studies in the United Kingdom at age 11 at the Yehudi Menuhin School, where her instructors included Hu Kun. She continued her studies with Hu Kun at the Royal Academy of Music (RAM) in London until 2003, as the RAM's Bachelor of Music program as its youngest-ever student, receiving a full scholarship. From 2004, she was a student of Maurice Hasson. She graduated from the RAM with first-class honours in 2005 at age 19, receiving HRH Princess Alice's Prize for exemplary studentship, the Louise Child Prize for the highest achievement among BMus graduates, and the Roth Prize for the best violin examination results. Lamsma made her professional solo debut at age 14, performing Paganini's Violin Concerto No. 1 with the Noord Nederlands Orkest and conductor Takuo Yuasa.

In 2019, the RAM named Lamsma a Fellow of the Royal Academy of Music. Collaborative projects have included the Pärt über Bach collaboration between the Amsterdam Sinfonietta, Candida Thompson and Lamsma, initially from the time of the COVID-19 pandemic, but subsequently delayed and later revived in 2024. For the 2021-2022 season, Lamsma was artist-in-residence at the Royal Conservatory of The Hague and with the Residentie Orchestra of The Hague. For the 2023–2024 season, Lamsma was artist-in-residence with the Royal Liverpool Philharmonic Orchestra. For the 2024–2025 season, Lamsma served as artist-in-residence for the AVROTROS Vrijdagconcert (Friday Concert) series in The Netherlands. Her work with contemporary music has included performing the premieres of violin concertos by Thomas Agerfeldt Olesen (2024, premiered April 2025) and by Joey Roukens (2025, subtitled 'Out of the Deep').

== Recordings ==
In 2006, Lamsma released her first commercial recording, with pianist Yurie Miura, of works by Edward Elgar for the Naxos label. Her second CD for Naxos was a 2009 release of three violin concertos by Louis Spohr, performed with the Jyväskylä Sinfonia and conductor Patrick Gallois. Lamsma has also commercially recorded works of Rautavaara, Gubaidulina, and Shostakovich. She has also recorded chamber music for the Challenge Classics label.

== Awards and honours ==
- First prize, Oskar Back National Violin Competition (2003)
- First prize, Benjamin Britten International Violin Competition (2004)
- First prize, Chinese International Violin Competition (2005)
- Silver medal, International Violin Competition of Indianapolis (2006)
- VSCD Classical Music Prize in the New Generation category (2010)
- Fellow of the Royal Academy of Music (2019)
