= Ray Iwazumi =

American violinist and musicologist

Ray Iwazumi (岩住 励, Iwazumi Ray; born July 17, 1976) is an American violinist and musicologist.

== Biography ==
Ray Iwazumi was born in Seattle, Washington. At age four, he began violin lessons with the Suzuki method in Galveston, Texas, and then continued with Beatrice Stanley. At the age of six, he was a prize-winner in the Junior Division of the National Federation Festivals. At age eight, he enrolled at the Mount Royal College Conservatory in Calgary, Canada, where he studied with Lise Elson. At age twelve, he entered The Juilliard School Pre-College Division, where he studied with Dorothy DeLay and Hyo Kang. He continued his studies at Juilliard in college, earning Bachelor of Music, Masters of Music, and Doctor of Musical Arts degrees in 1998, 1999 and 2004, respectively. In 1999, he began studies with Igor Oistrakh at the Royal Conservatory of Brussels under the auspices of a Fulbright grant. At the Royal Conservatory of Brussels, he earned Belgian master's degrees in violin and chamber music in 2000 and 2004, respectively, which he completed in parallel with his doctoral studies at The Juilliard School. He is currently on the faculty at The Juilliard School.

Iwazumi has performed in the United States, Europe, Central America, South Korea, and Japan. He concertizes regularly in Japan, collaborating with artists such as pianists Shuku Iwasaki, Akira Eguchi, and Toshiki Usui; violinists Amy Iwazumi and Asuka Sezaki; and guitarist Daisuke Suzuki. He has also given concerts performing on contemporary violins, including ‘del Gesù’ copies made by the luthier Andreas Preuss. Iwazumi has composed original works and arrangements, including a work for cello and piano, commissioned by Shuku Iwasaki in 2010 for her “Music In Style” series.

He has also participated in the Tsunami Violin Project, playing the “Tsunami violin” made by Muneyuki Nakazawa. Iwazumi was the 522nd violinist to perform on the instrument.

Iwazumi has a society of supporters in ″Friends of Ray Iwazumi,″ whose primary objective is to develop strategies for audience development.

== Musicology and music editing ==
As a musicologist, Ray Iwazumi lectures regularly and has authored several articles. He is particularly well known for his extensive research on the works of Eugène Ysaÿe (1858 – 1931).

Articles have been published in The Strad, MLA Notes, and the Juilliard Journal. Between October 2008 and November 2012, he authored monthly articles exploring the Ysaÿe Sonatas in depth, in Japanese, for the Japanese journal String. He has also contributed to the G. Henle Verlag blog.

He has edited Urtext and performing editions for G. Henle Verlag:

- Henryk Wieniawski: Scherzo-Tarantella Op. 16 (G. Henle Verlag, HN 553) [2013]
- Henry Vieuxtemps: Violinkonzert Nr. 5 a-moll Opus 37 (G. Henle Verlag, HN 1257) [2016]

== Discography ==
- Eugène Ysaÿe, Six Sonatas for solo violin, Op. 27 and Posthumous “Etude”, Mittenwald, MTWD-99037
- Eugène Ysaÿe 1858 – 2008, Bibliothèque royale de Belgique, Musique en Wallonie, MEW 0851 (2008)
- Iwazumi & Usui play Brahms, Debussy, Mozart, Wieniawski, and Ysaÿe, Ashford Records
- Iwazumi & Usui play the Brahms Violin Sonatas, Ashford Records
- Iwazumi & Usui play Schumann Violin Sonatas Nos. 1 and 2, Ashford Records
- Iwazumi & Usui play the Fauré Violin Sonatas Nos. 1 and 2, Ashford Records
