= Boston Symphony Orchestra =

American symphony orchestra in Boston

- Orchestra
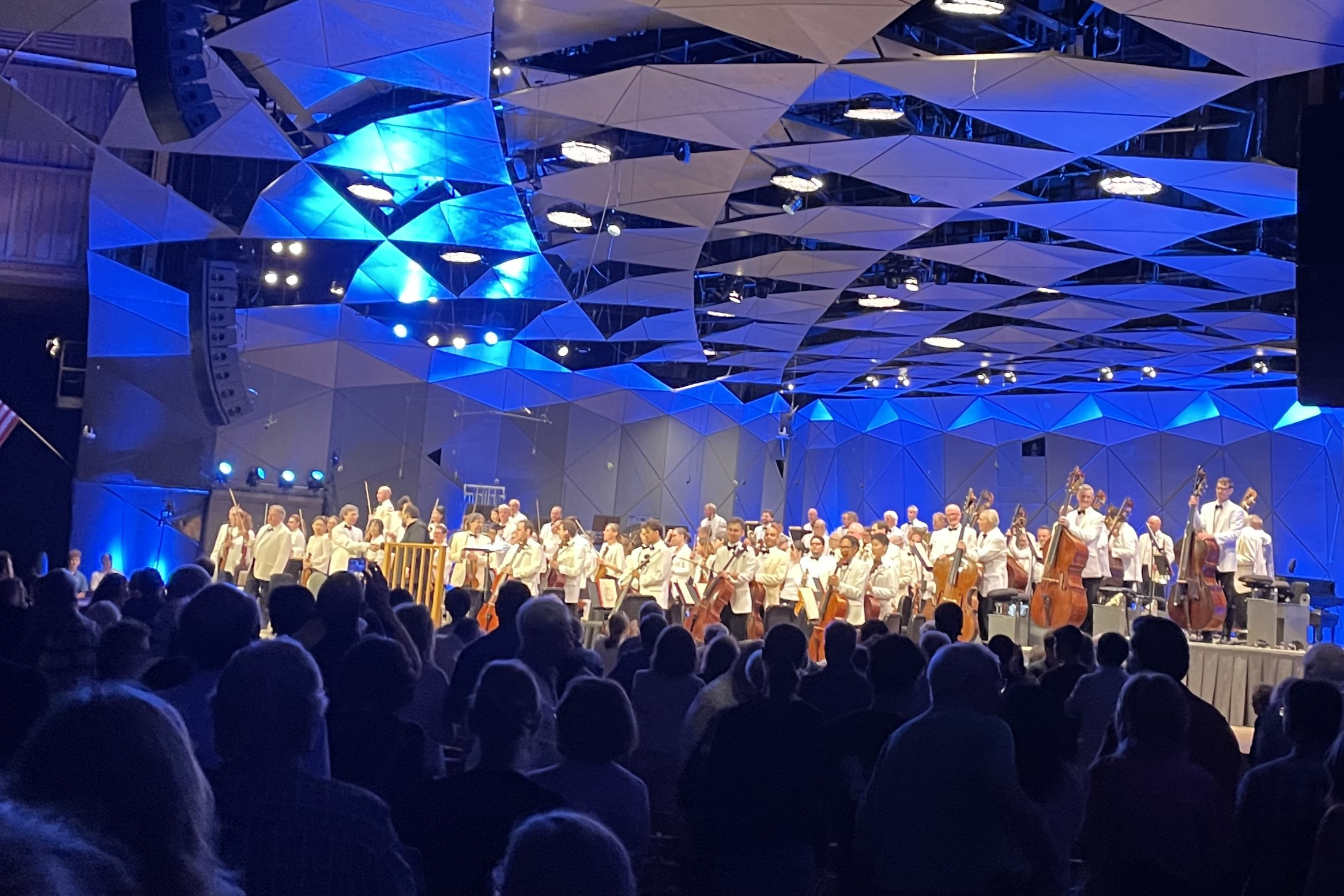
- The BSO at the opening concert of the 2023 Tanglewood season
- Short name: BSO
- Founded: 1881 (145 years ago)
- Location: 301 Massachusetts Avenue, Boston, Massachusetts, U.S.
- Concert hall: Symphony Hall; Koussevitzky Music Shed, Tanglewood
- Music director: Andris Nelsons
- Website: bso.org

The Boston Symphony Orchestra (BSO) is an American symphony orchestra based in Boston. It is the second-oldest orchestra in the United States and one of the five major American symphony orchestras commonly referred to as the "Big Five". (Note: Although the St. Louis Symphony Orchestra claims to be the second oldest, the organization founded in 1880 was the St. Louis Choral Society; it absorbed a completely separate symphonic organization in 1890, this new hybrid evolving into the St. Louis Symphony Society in 1907. This is stated clearly on the St. Louis Symphony Orchestra's own website. By contrast, the BSO had a full orchestral complement of musicians and a scheduled performance season of 46 concerts its first year of operation, 1881–1882.) Founded by Henry Lee Higginson in 1881, the BSO performs most of its concerts at Boston's Symphony Hall and in the summer performs at Tanglewood. It has an offshoot organization, The Boston Pops, founded in 1885 also by Higginson to perform "concerts of a lighter kind of music." The Pops has its own schedule and musical director, and consists mostly of musicians from the ranks of the BSO.

Since its founding, the orchestra has had 17 music directors, including George Henschel, Serge Koussevitzky, Henri Rabaud, Pierre Monteux, Charles Munch, Erich Leinsdorf, William Steinberg and James Levine. Andris Nelsons is the current music director of the BSO. Seiji Ozawa had held the title of BSO music director laureate. Bernard Haitink had held the title of principal guest conductor of the BSO from 1995 to 2004, then conductor emeritus until his death in 2021. The orchestra has made gramophone recordings since 1917 and has occasionally played on soundtrack recordings for films, including Schindler's List.

== History ==
=== Early years ===
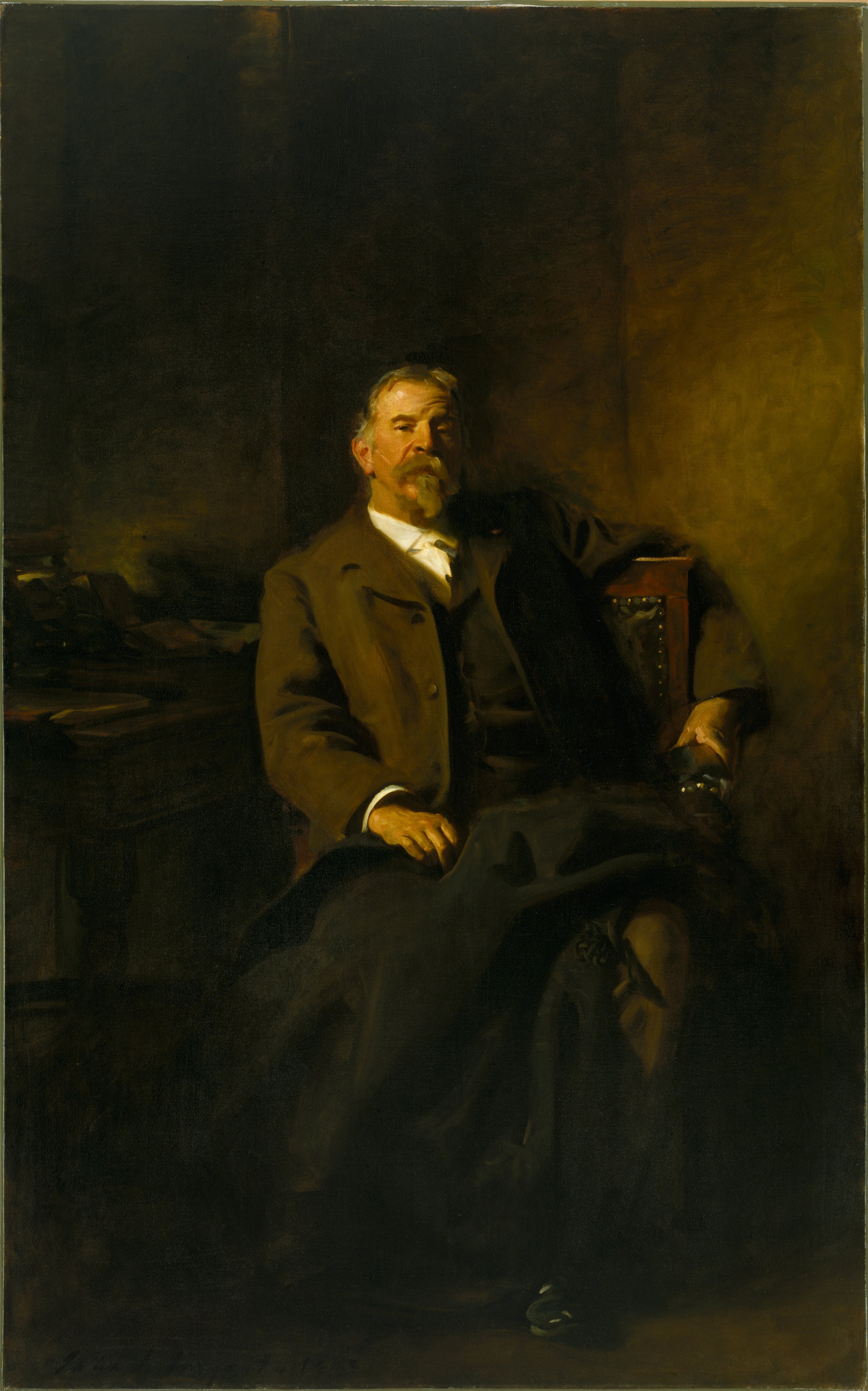
Henry Lee Higginson, founding father of the BSO.

The BSO was founded in 1881 by Henry Lee Higginson. Its first conductor was George Henschel, who was a noted baritone as well as conductor, and a close friend of Johannes Brahms. For the orchestra, Henschel devised innovative orchestral seating charts and sent them to Brahms, who replied approvingly and commented on the issues raised by horn and viola sections in a letter of mid-November 1881. The BSO's first concert took place on October 22, 1881. The program consisted of Beethoven's The Consecration of the House, as well as music by Joseph Haydn, Christoph Willibald Gluck, Franz Schubert and Carl Maria von Weber.

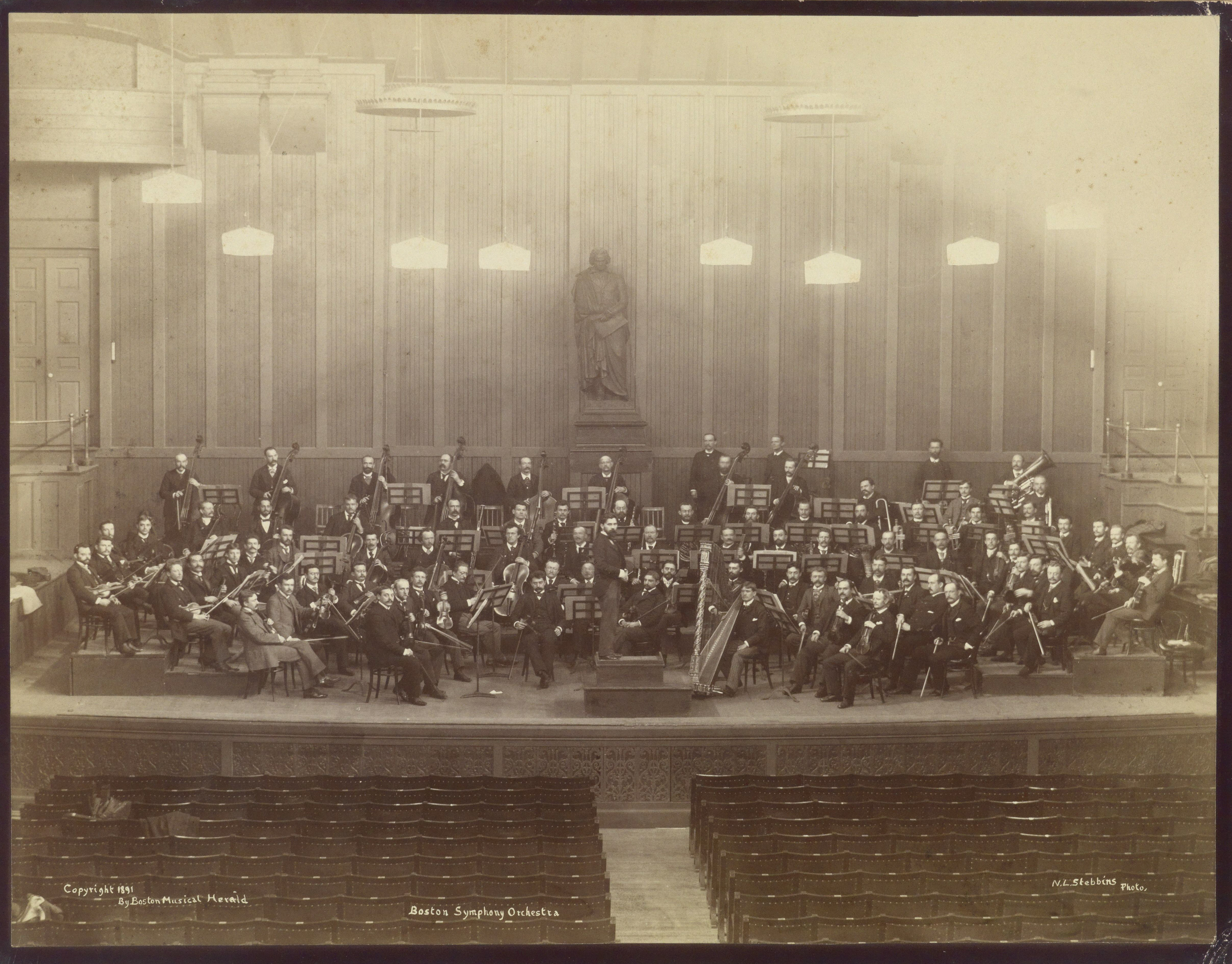
The BSO at Boston Music Hall in 1891.

The orchestra's four subsequent music directors were all trained in Austria, including the seminal and highly influential Hungarian-born conductor Arthur Nikisch, in accordance with the tastes of Higginson. Wilhelm Gericke served twice, from 1884 to 1889 and again from 1898 to 1906. According to Joseph Horowitz's review of correspondence, Higginson considered 25 candidates to replace Gericke after receiving notice in 1905. He decided not to offer the position to Gustav Mahler, Fritz Steinbach, and Willem Mengelberg but did not rule out the young Bruno Walter if nobody more senior were to accept. He offered the position to Hans Richter in February 1905, who declined, to Felix Mottl in November, who was previously engaged, and then to previous director Nikisch, who declined; the post was finally offered to Karl Muck, who accepted and began his duties in October 1906. He was conductor until 1908 and again from 1912 to 1918.

The music director 1908–12 was Max Fiedler. He conducted the premiere of Ignacy Jan Paderewski's Symphony in B minor "Polonia" in 1909.

Following American entry into World War I, Muck (born in Germany but a Swiss citizen since childhood), was falsely accused by unscrupulous newspaper editor John R. Rathom of knowingly refusing a request to play The Star Spangled Banner. Although Higginson had not told Muck of the request and the BSO always ended future concerts with the American national anthem, Muck was subjected by Rathom to a trial by media anyway and was arrested by Federal agents shortly before a performance of Johann Sebastian Bach's St Matthew Passion in March 1918. Along with 29 of the BSO best musicians, Muck was imprisoned in Fort Oglethorpe, a German-American internment camp in the State of Georgia, without trial or appeal until the summer after the Armistice, when he and his wife agreed to be deported to neutral Denmark. Muck felt deeply insulted by the injustice of these events, vowed never to perform on American soil again, and conducted thereafter only in Europe.

The BSO's next two titled conductors were French: Henri Rabaud, who took over from Muck for a season, and then Pierre Monteux from 1919 to 1924. Monteux, because of a musician's strike, was able to replace 30 players, thus changing the orchestra's sound; the orchestra developed a reputation for a "French" sound which some claim persists to some degree to this day.

=== Koussevitzky and Munch ===
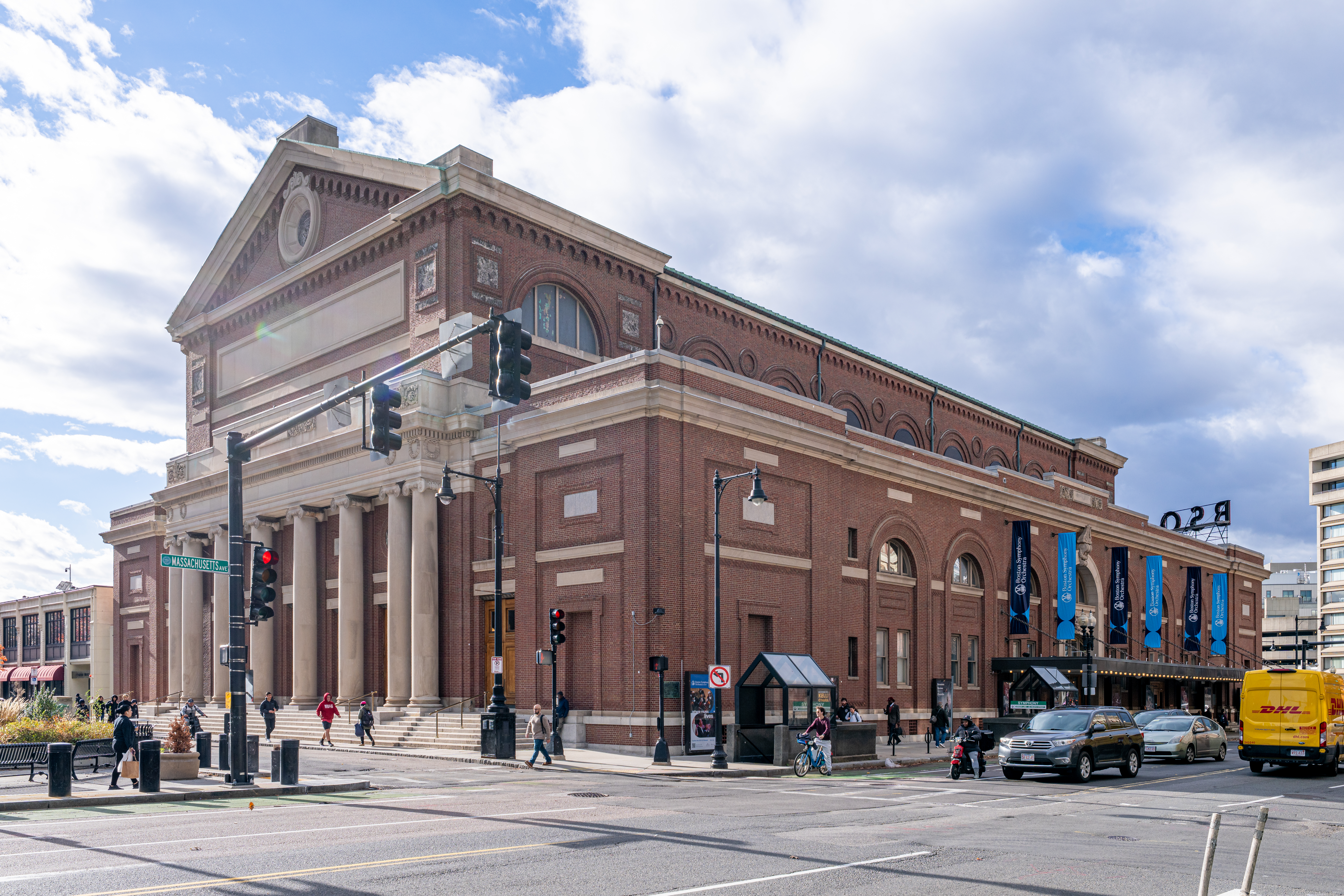
Symphony Hall, Boston, the main base of the orchestra since 1900

The orchestra's reputation increased during the 1924–1949 music directorship of Serge Koussevitzky. One million radio listeners tuned in when Koussevitzky and the orchestra were the first to perform a live concert for radio broadcast, which they did on NBC in 1926.

In August 1942, the American Federation of Musicians kicked off the two-year long musician's strike, with the goal of musicians receiving more in royalty payments from record companies. Initially, the BSO was the only major performing group in the nation unaffected; the orchestra's musicians hadn't been unionized since the orchestra's founding. By the end of 1942, however, the orchestra joined the AFM, effectively joining the strike, and also kicking off a long series of live radio concerts on CBS with Koussevitzky conducting.

Under Koussevitzky, the orchestra gave regular radio broadcasts and established its summer home at Tanglewood, where Koussevitzky founded the Berkshire Music Center, which is now the Tanglewood Music Center. Those network radio broadcasts ran from 1926 through 1951, and again from 1954 through 1956. The orchestra continues to make regular live radio broadcasts to the present day. The Boston Symphony has been closely involved with Boston's WGBH Radio as an outlet for its concerts.

Koussevitzky also commissioned many new pieces from prominent composers, including the Symphony No. 4 of Sergei Prokofiev, George Gershwin's Second Rhapsody and the Symphony of Psalms by Igor Stravinsky. They also gave the premiere of Béla Bartók's Concerto for Orchestra, which had been commissioned by the Koussevitzky Music Foundation at the instigation of Fritz Reiner and Joseph Szigeti.

Koussevitzky started a tradition of commissions that the orchestra continued, including new works by Heitor Villa-Lobos (Symphony No. 11) and Henri Dutilleux for its 75th anniversary, Roger Sessions, and Andrzej Panufnik, for the 100th, and lately for the 125th works by Leon Kirchner, Elliott Carter, and Peter Lieberson. Other BSO commissions have included John Corigliano's Symphony No. 2 for the 100th anniversary of Symphony Hall. Hans Werner Henze dedicated his Eighth Symphony to the orchestra.

Although Koussevitzky recommended his protégé Leonard Bernstein to be his successor after he retired in 1949, the BSO awarded the position to the Alsatian maestro Charles Munch, who would lead until 1962. Munch had made his Boston conducting debut in 1946. He led the orchestra on its first overseas tour, and also produced their first stereo recording in February 1954 for RCA Victor. In 1952, Munch appointed the first woman to hold a principal chair in a major U.S. orchestra, flutist Doriot Anthony Dwyer, who remained as BSO principal for 38 years.

=== Leinsdorf, Steinberg, and Ozawa ===
Erich Leinsdorf became music director in 1962 and held the post until 1969. William Steinberg was then music director from 1969 to 1972. Steinberg was "ill and ailing" according to composer/author Jan Swafford, and "for four years he was indisposed much of the time." After Steinberg's retirement, according to BSO trustee John Thorndike (who was on the search committee) the symphony's board spoke to Colin Davis and "investigated very thoroughly" his appointment, but Davis's commitments to his young family did not allow his moving to Boston from England; instead he accepted the post of BSO principal guest conductor, which he held from 1972 to 1984. As the search continued, Leonard Bernstein met with four board members and recommended Michael Tilson Thomas, who had been assistant conductor and associate conductor under Steinberg, for the directorship, but the young conductor "did not have sufficient support among the BSO players," according to journalist Jeremy Eichler. The committee eventually chose Seiji Ozawa, who became music director in 1973 and held the post until 2002, the longest tenure of any Boston Symphony conductor. In 1979, he led the Boston Symphony Orchestra's visit to the People's Republic of China to celebrate the normalization of US-China diplomatic relations, making it the second American orchestra to ever visit the country.

Ozawa's tenure involved significant dissension and controversy. One concern was his handling of the Tanglewood Music Center. Greg Sandow wrote in The Wall Street Journal in December 1998 that Ozawa "had taken control of the school with what many people thought was surprising and abrupt brutality. Members of the faculty, themselves world-famous, had angrily resigned." The first departure was in the fall of 1996, when Ozawa fired Richard Ortner, the festival's administrator. After a tumultuous season, at the end of summer 1997, pianist Gilbert Kalish resigned from the faculty by sending Ozawa what the pianist/conductor Leon Fleisher later described as "a blistering letter of resignation, and he made it public"; Fleisher, who was also a long-term member of the Tanglewood faculty, wrote, "Most of the faculty felt he was speaking for them." Ozawa reduced Fleisher's role at the Center, offering him instead a "ceremonial puppet role", and Fleisher resigned, writing to Ozawa that the proposed role was "somewhat akin to having my legs chopped off at the knees, you then gently taking me by the arm and inviting me for a stroll. I must decline the invitation." By contrast, Boston Globe music critic Richard Dyer wrote that:

...not every change was for the better...But there can be no question that Tanglewood is a busier, more adventurous, and more exciting place than it was before Ozawa became music director.

A more basic concern involved perceived shortcomings in Ozawa's musical leadership; as Sandow wrote in the 1998 article, "what mattered far more was how badly the BSO plays." He noted that a group of Boston Symphony musicians had privately published a newsletter, Counterpoint, expressing their concerns; in the summer of 1995 concertmaster Malcolm Lowe and principal cellist Jules Eskin wrote that in rehearsal Ozawa gave no "specific leadership in matters of tempo and rhythm," no "expression of care about sound quality", and no "distinctly-conveyed conception of the character of each piece the BSO plays."

The BSO's managing director, Mark Volpe, responded that some board members considered Sandow's article a "hatchet job", and some unnamed BSO "observers" were said in The Boston Globe to believe that Sandow "might be sharpening blades for BSO members with axes to grind". Sandow called the suggestion "nonsense", saying, "I found them [players criticizing Ozawa in his article], they didn't find me". André Previn wrote to The Wall Street Journal defending Ozawa, and Lowe wrote to the Journal that he was "frustrated and upset to see my name attached to the article since your reporter did not contact me and chose to quote a letter published nearly four years ago in an internal orchestra publication." Boston Symphony Board of Trustees president Nicholas T. Zervas described Sandow as expressing an "`insulting, reductive, and racist view of [Ozawa] as a samurai kept in place in order to raise Japanese money" – a point Sandow rebutted in a letter to the Journal, saying "These are things I didn't say. I'd heard the charge about Japanese money while I was writing my piece, so I asked Mark Volpe, the BSO's General Manager, what he thought of it. Mark refuted it, and I quoted him approvingly." Critic Lloyd Schwarz defended Sandow in the Boston alternative paper, The Boston Phoenix

Various current music critics described a decline in the orchestra's playing during Ozawa's tenure. Jan Swafford wrote:

Now and then he gave a standout performance, usually in the full-throated late-Romantic and 20th-century literature, but most of the time what came out was glittering surfaces with nothing substantial beneath: no discernable concept, no vision.

In a 2013 survey of recordings of The Rite of Spring by Igor Stravinsky, the composer Russell Platt wrote in The New Yorker:

Seiji Ozawa's downright depressing account, recorded in 1979: the Boston Symphony Orchestra's sonic shine, developed by Ozawa's predecessors Monteux and Charles Munch, is audibly dripping away, its dispirited musicians losing their sense of individual responsibility to the score. It is a record of a professional relationship that went on far too long.

On June 22, 1999, the symphony announced Ozawa's departure as music director, as of 2002, following the sudden announcement of Ozawa's appointment as music director of the Vienna State Opera – a decision the board had heard about only a day earlier, where Volpe said he was "a little surprised at the timing". He gave his last concert with the orchestra in July 2002.

During Ozawa's tenure, Bernard Haitink served as principal guest conductor from 1995 to 2004. Haitink was named conductor emeritus in 2004, and actively served in the post as a returning guest conductor through his retirement in 2019.

=== Levine and Nelsons ===
In 2004, James Levine became the first American-born music director of the BSO. Levine received critical praise for revitalizing the quality and repertoire since the beginning of his tenure, including championing contemporary composers. During Levine's tenure, by February 2009 the BSO had performed 18 world premieres, 12 of them conducted by Levine. To fund the more challenging and expensive of Levine's musical projects with the orchestra, the orchestra established an "Artistic Initiative Fund" of about $40 million. (As of March 2013, the Boston Symphony also claimed an endowment of $413 million, the largest of any orchestra in the world.) Levine suffered from recurring injuries and health problems during his BSO tenure, which led to his resignation as BSO music director as of September 1, 2011.

In the wake of Levine's resignation, Andris Nelsons made his first guest-conducting appearance with the BSO in March 2011, as an emergency substitute for Levine at Carnegie Hall in Mahler's Symphony No. 9. He subsequently guest-conducted the BSO at Tanglewood in July 2012, and made his first appearance with the BSO at Symphony Hall in January 2013. In May 2013, the BSO named Nelsons as its 15th music director, effective with the 2014–2015 season. His initial contract was for 5 years, with 8–10 weeks of scheduled appearances in the first year of the contract, and 12 weeks in subsequent years. Nelsons held the title of Music Director Designate for the 2013–2014 season. In August 2015, the BSO announced the extension of Nelsons' contract as music director through the 2021–2022 season, with a new contract of 8 years to replace the initial 5-year contract, and which also contains an evergreen clause for automatic renewal.

In September 2015, the orchestra announced a new artistic collaboration with the Leipzig Gewandhaus Orchestra, of which Nelsons was appointed as its next Gewandhauskapellmeister, effective with the 2017–2018 season.

In October 2020, the BSO announced a further extension of Nelsons' contract as music director through August 2025, with an evergreen clause for automatic renewal. In January 2024, the BSO announced the conversion of Nelsons' contract as its music director to a rolling evergreen contract. On March 6, 2026, the orchestra's board announced that Nelsons would be leaving at the end of the summer 2027 Tanglewood season.

==== Unequal-pay lawsuit ====
On July 2, 2018, BSO principal flautist Elizabeth Rowe filed a lawsuit in the Superior Court of Suffolk County, Massachusetts, claiming pay discrimination on the basis of gender. Rowe said she was paid much less than principal oboist John Ferrillo since 2004 and was seeking more than $200,000 in unpaid compensation from the orchestra. The BSO tried to discredit Rowe's claim that she was being discriminated against because of the unequal pay compared to Ferrillo by saying in a court filing that the two wind instruments were not comparable. After mediation, the case was settled out of court in February 2019 for an undisclosed amount.

=== Recent history ===
In January 2020, the BSO cancelled its planned tour of Asia, the first American orchestra to cancel overseas travel in the wake of the COVID-19 outbreak. Subsequent events related to the COVID-19 pandemic included the following:

- Cancellation of the 2020 Tanglewood summer festival season
- Cancellation of its scheduled subscription concerts through November 2020, the first-ever full cancellation of the orchestra's autumn subscription concerts in its history
- Staff redundancies effective September 1, 2020
- Reduction in orchestra musician compensation in its latest labour agreement, from August 24, 2020, through August 27, 2023

In succession to Mark Volpe, Gail Samuel became the BSO's president and chief executive officer in June 2021, the first woman to be named to the posts in the history of the orchestra. In December 2022, the BSO announced simultaneously the resignation of Samuel as its president and CEO, effective January 3, 2023, and the appointment of Jeffrey D. Dunn as its interim president and CEO, effective January 4, 2023. In May 2023, the BSO announced the appointment of Chad Smith as its next president and chief executive officer, effective in the autumn of 2023.

==== Nelsons contract termination ====
On March 6, 2026, the BSO board of directors and BSO president Chad Smith announced that Nelsons would conclude his Boston Symphony Orchestra tenure at the end of the summer 2027 Tanglewood season. The BSO board of directors stated that:

"The decision to not renew his contract was made by the B.S.O.'s board of trustees because, beyond our shared desire to ensure our orchestra continues to perform at the highest levels, the B.S.O. and Andris Nelsons were not aligned on future vision".

Nelsons sent a letter to the orchestra's staff and musicians, saying that "this is not the decision I anticipated or wanted." On March 27, the symphony membership posted that following a March 19 meeting with members of the BSO Board regarding the decision to remove Nelsons, a decision made whereby the symphony musicians were not consulted, they felt that their concerns "all went unaddressed," and that they prioritized "correcting the course currently pursued by Management and Board, up to and including our support to reinstate Andris Nelsons."

The termination of Nelsons' contract was unusually public and acrimonious, and "set off a storm of anger and protest", particularly from patrons. The orchestra's management stood by its decision, saying that Nelsons was not aligned with its mission of making the BSO more inclusive and accessible to the Boston community. The orchestra's principal librarian attributed the decision to purported efforts to transform the BSO into "a venue management corporation" offering "less and less classical music concerts."

== Related ensembles ==
The Boston Pops, the Boston Symphony Orchestra minus its principal players, was founded in 1885, and plays lighter, more popular classics, and show tunes. Arthur Fiedler was the conductor who did the most to increase the fame of the Boston Pops over his tenure from 1930 to 1979. Film composer John Williams succeeded Fiedler as the conductor of the Pops from 1980 to 1993. Since 1995, conductor Keith Lockhart has led the Boston Pops.

The Boston Symphony Chamber Players were launched in 1964. Today they are the only chamber ensemble composed of principal players from an American symphony orchestra. In addition to regular performances in Boston and Tanglewood, they have performed throughout the United States and Europe. They have also recorded for RCA Victor, Deutsche Grammophon, Philips, and Nonesuch.

Performing with the BSO and Boston Pops for major choral works is the Tanglewood Festival Chorus. Organized in 1970 by its founding director, John Oliver, the Chorus comprises over 300 volunteer singers. Before the creation of the Tanglewood Festival Chorus, and for some time after, the BSO frequently employed the New England Conservatory Chorus conducted by Lorna Cooke DeVaron, Chorus pro Musica, Harvard Glee Club and Radcliffe Choral Society. In February 2017, the BSO announced the appointment of James Burton as the new conductor of the Tanglewood Festival Chorus and as the newly created BSO Choral Director, both with immediate effect. Burton founded the Boston Symphony Children's Choir in 2018. James Burton stepped down from his position as the conductor of the Tanglewood Festival Chorus in August 2025. The orchestra named Jean-Sébastien Vallée as the Chorus' third director at the end of August 2025.

== Recordings ==
The Boston Symphony made its first acoustical recordings in 1917 in Camden, New Jersey, for the Victor Talking Machine Company conducted by Karl Muck. Among the first discs recorded was the finale to Tchaikovsky's fourth symphony. Under Serge Koussevitzky, the orchestra made its first electrical recordings, also for Victor, in the late 1920s. These electrical recordings included Ravel's Boléro. Recording sessions took place in Symphony Hall. Koussevitzky's final recording with the Boston Symphony was a high fidelity version of Sibelius' Symphony No. 2, recorded in 1950 and released on LP.

In February 1954, RCA Victor began recording the orchestra in stereo, under the direction of Charles Munch. RCA Victor continued to record Munch and the orchestra through 1962, his final year as music director in Boston (see the Charles Munch discography for a complete list of commercial recordings with the BSO under Charles Munch). During Munch's tenure, Pierre Monteux made a series of records with the BSO for RCA Victor (see Pierre Monteux for a complete list of commercial recordings with the BSO).

Erich Leinsdorf, who had already made numerous recordings for RCA Victor, continued his association with the company during his seven years in Boston. These included a critically acclaimed performance of Brahms' German Requiem (see Erich Leinsdorf for a complete list).

Then, the orchestra switched to Deutsche Grammophon (DG) under William Steinberg. RCA Victor recorded several LPs with Steinberg and Berlioz's Symphonie Fantastique with Georges Prêtre during the transition to DG (see William Steinberg for a complete list of commercial recordings). Michael Tilson Thomas, who was the assistant conductor and associate conductor under Steinberg, also made several recordings for DG; some of these have been reissued on CD.

Due to Steinberg's illness, DG recorded the BSO with Rafael Kubelík in Beethoven's Symphony No. 5 (part of his cycle of Beethoven symphonies with nine different orchestras), Ma Vlast by Bedřich Smetana and in Béla Bartók's Concerto for Orchestra as well as with Eugen Jochum conducting Symphony No. 41 by Wolfgang Amadeus Mozart and Franz Schubert's Symphony No. 8.

As a guest conductor in the 1960s, Ozawa made several recordings with the BSO for RCA Victor. He continued the BSO relationship with DG while making several other releases for New World Records. Over the course of Ozawa's tenure, the BSO diversified its relationships, making recordings under Ozawa with CBS, EMI, Philips Records, RCA, and TELARC.

The BSO also recorded for Philips under Colin Davis. Leonard Bernstein made records for both Columbia and DG with the BSO, including selections from his last concert ever as a conductor on August 19, 1990, at Tanglewood. The BSO has also appeared on Decca with Vladimir Ashkenazy, with Charles Dutoit and André Previn for DG, and on Phillips and Sony Classical with Bernard Haitink.

The BSO has also done recordings for film scores on occasion. Films such as Schindler's List and Saving Private Ryan (both composed and conducted by John Williams) were recorded by the orchestra at Symphony Hall.

In the James Levine era, the BSO had no standing recording contract with a major label; the Grammy Award-winning recording of Levine conducting the BSO with Lorraine Hunt Lieberson in Peter Lieberson's Neruda Songs, released on Nonesuch Records, was the only major label recording during Levine's tenure. On February 19, 2009, the BSO announced the launch of a new series of recordings on their own label, BSO Classics. Some of the recordings are available only as digital downloads. The initial recordings included live concert performances of William Bolcom's 8th Symphony and Lyric Concerto, the latter with flutist James Galway, Mahler's Sixth Symphony, the Brahms Ein deutsches Requiem, and Ravel's complete Daphnis et Chloé, which won the 2010 Grammy Award for Best Orchestral Performance.

In April 2015, the BSO announced a new recording partnership with Deutsche Grammophon that focuses on the music of Dmitri Shostakovich, with Nelsons as conductor. The first recording in the series, of the Tenth Symphony recorded in concert in April 2015, was released on CD in August 2015, and subsequently won the year's Grammy award for Best Orchestral Performance. The most recent recording in the series, released in October 2023, concluded the cycle of Shostakovich symphonies, featuring performances of the 2nd, 3rd, 12th, and 13th symphonies. With the BSO, Nelsons has also won the Grammy for Orchestral Performance in 2017 for Shostakovich: Under Stalin's Shadow - Symphonies Nos. 5, 8 & 9., 2019 for Shostakovich: Symphonies Nos. 4 and 11, and 2026 for Messiaen's Turangalila-Symphonie, as well as the 2026 Grammy for Best Classical Instrumental Solo Award for Yo-Yo Ma's performance of the Shostakovich Cello Concertos with the BSO.

== Music directors ==

- George Henschel (1881–1884)
- Wilhelm Gericke (1884–1889)
- Arthur Nikisch (1889–1893)
- Emil Paur (1893–1898)
- Wilhelm Gericke (1898–1906)
- Karl Muck (1906–1908)
- Max Fiedler (1908–1912)
- Karl Muck (1912–1918)
- Henri Rabaud (1918–1919)
- Pierre Monteux (1919–1924)
- Serge Koussevitzky (1924–1949)
- Charles Munch (1949–1962)
- Erich Leinsdorf (1962–1969)
- William Steinberg (1969–1972)
- Seiji Ozawa (1973–2002)
- James Levine (2004–2011)
- Andris Nelsons (2014–2027)

== Composer Chair ==
- 1980–1993 John Williams
- 2024–2027 Carlos Simon

== In popular culture ==
In the 1974–1975 American television situation comedy Paul Sand in Friends and Lovers, several cast members played fictional personnel of the Boston Symphony Orchestra. The show's star, Paul Sand, portrayed Robert Dreyfuss, who played double bass, while Steve Landesberg played violinist Fred Meyerbach. Craig Richard Nelson was the orchestra's conductor, Mason Woodruff, and Dick Wesson was its manager, Jack Riordan. In one episode, Robert's father Ben, played by Jack Gilford, had a job in the orchestra's ticket office. Guest stars who appeared as musicians playing in or with the orchestra during the show's 15-episode run included Henry Winkler as a cellist, Leon Askin as a violinist, and Susan Neher as a flutist.

== See also ==
- Category:Music commissioned by the Boston Symphony Orchestra (44)
- Richard Burgin, concertmaster of the BSO from 1920 to 1962
- Joseph Silverstein, concertmaster of the BSO from 1962 to 1984
- Malcolm Lowe, concertmaster of the BSO from 1984 to 2019
