= Desirée Ruhstrat =

American violinist

- Born: Milwaukee, Wisconsin
- Education: Curtis Institute of Music (BM)
- Occupation: Violinist
- Employer: Bienen School of Music
- Website: https://desireeruhstrat.com/

Desirée Ruhstrat is an American violinist, chamber musician, and violin professor based in the Chicago Metropolitan Area. A professor of violin at the Bienen School of Music, she also runs a private studio in Highland Park, Illinois. She is the violinist in the Grammy nominated Lincoln Trio and the ICMA nominated Black Oak Ensemble. A renowned soloist, Ruhstrat most recently soloed with the Chicago Symphony Orchestra in July 2024 at Ravinia. She also serves on the faculty at the Heifetz International Music Institute, Ascent Music Festival and is the Artistic Director of Nova Linea Musica.

== Early life and education ==
Ruhstrat was born in Milwaukee, Wisconsin and began her studies at Milwaukee Conservatory of Music. She then studied with Betty Haag at DePaul University, after which she moved to Denver, Colorado to study with Harold Wippler at the recommendation of Eugene Fodor. She then studied with Josef Gingold at Indiana University for a year. Ruhstrat earned a bachelor's degree from the Curtis Institute of Music, where she studied with Aaron Rosand.

== Professional career ==
Ruhstrat made her professional debut at the age of 12 with Lukas Foss and the Milwaukee Symphony Orchestra. At age 16, she was invited by Sir Georg Solti to perform Tchaikovsky's Violin Concerto in Chicago's Orchestra Hall. She has since performed with orchestras throughout the world, including the Berlin Radio Symphony, Radio Suisse Romande, Gottingen Symphony, Philharmonia Da Camera, Orchestra Symphonica Auguescalientes, Colorado Symphony, Oregon Symphony, Concerto Soloists Of Philadelphia, Utah Symphony, Chicago Symphony Orchestra, Chicago Civic Orchestra, Debut Orchestra of Los Angeles, and National Repertory Orchestra.

Ruhstrat plays on a 1685 Goffredo Cappa violin which is on generous loan.
