= Liviu Prunaru =

Romanian musician (born 1969)

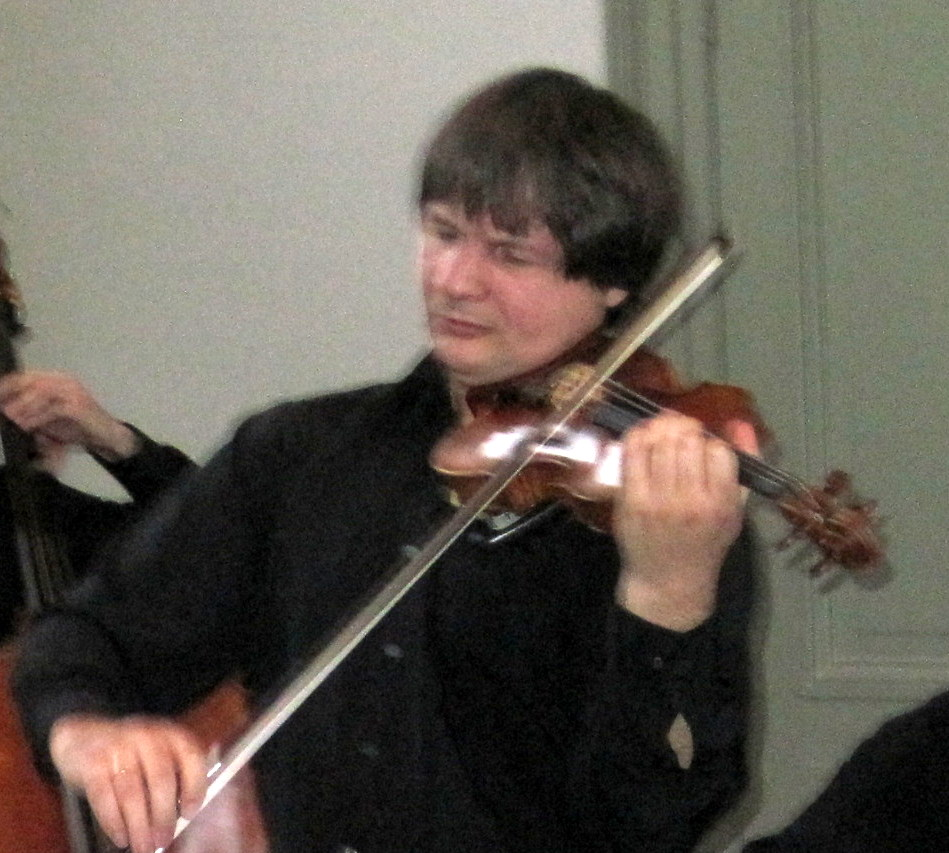
Liviu Prunaru

Liviu Prunaru (born 1969 in Craiova) is a Romanian violinist. He is a former Royal Concertgebouw Orchestra's concertmaster.

He has won top prizes and gained international recognition at widely recognized international violin competitions, including the 1997 Gold Medal at the Dong-A International Violin Competition in South Korea, the Silver Medal at the 1998 Indianapolis International Violin Competition in the US, the Silver (2nd Grand Prize) Medal at the 1993 Queen Elizabeth in Brussels, the Gold Medal at the 1991 Rodolfo Lipizer International Violin Competition in Italy, and the Gold Medal at the R. Molinari Violin Competition in Switzerland, among others.

== History ==
Born in Craiova, Romania, Prunaru began his violin studies at the age of 6 with Professor Oprisan. His teachers, Mr.Berbec, Ms. Mihaela Mailat, Ms.Adriana Carpen and Ms.Cornelia Bonzetti, guided him through his early years. During this period he won seven national competitions and 1st prize at the International Kocian competition in Czechoslovakia. Then in 1990, Prunaru was invited by violinist and Maestro Alberto Lysy to study with him at the renowned Menuhin Academy of Gstaad, Switzerland, where he worked among great artists like Lord Yehudi Menuhin, Igor Oistrakh, Ruggiero Ricci, Nikita Magaloff, Jean- Pierre Rampal, Peter-Lukas Graf, and Pierre Amoyal. He completed his professional studies with Miss Dorothy DeLay in New York, where he also actively participated in Master Classes with Itzakh Perlman.

Prunaru made his New York City debut with the Juilliard Symphony in Lincoln Center's Alice Tully Hall after winning the 1st grand prize in the Juilliard Mendelssohn Competition. Also in 1999, he won the 1st grand prize at the E. Nakamichi Wieniawski Violin Concerto Competition, which resulted in performances with the Aspen Young Artists Orchestra.

He has featured as a soloist with many groups. These inclue Concertgebouw Amsterdam, the Royal Philharmonic Orchestra, the London Symphony Orchestra, Belgium National Orchestra, Westdeutsche Sinfonia, Athens Philharmonic Orchestra, Bari Symphony Orchestra, Bucharest Radio-Symphony Orchestra, Orchestra Mayo in Buenos Aires, Indianapolis Chamber Orchestra, the Meridian Symphony, Mississippi Symphony, the Juilliard Symphony, and the Puchon Philharmonic Orchestra in South Korea among many others. He has collaborated with many conductors including Fabio Luisi, Emmanuel Krivine, Arthur Arnold, Alexandru Lascae, Georges Octors, Dmitri Lyss, Alexander Dimitriev, Peter Oundjian, Yuri Simonov, Andrew Litton, Peter Braschkat, Cristian Mandeal, Lukas Vis, Horia Andreescu, Mario Benzecry, and Park Eun Seong.

He has performed at many prestigious festivals including Aspen (US), Menuhin (CH), Enescu (RO), Brussels, Buenos Aires, Wallonie, Flanders, Evian, Athens, Incontri in Terra di Siena, Ascoli, and Salzburg Festivals. Prunaru has recorded many CDs with Camerata Lysy, as well as his own debut CD featuring works by Strauss, Brahms, Gluck, de Falla, Saint-Saens, and Sarasate with pianist Luc Devos, which was released by Pavane Records.

The Swiss record company Claves released all three violin concertos by Saint-Saens where Prunaru is accompanied by the Ensemble Orchestral de Paris and the conductor Lawrence Foster. As a last addition to his discography, 3 recordings came out in 2005: Beethoven's Integral violin and piano Sonatas, with Dana Protopopescu as partner, Vivaldi's Four Seasons with Virtuosy from Lviv, conductor Serhyi Burko and Dvorak's violin concerto with David Angus, conductor and Symfonie Orkester of Flanders.

In September 2006, after 14 years of teaching at the Menuhin Academy, he became concert master of the Royal Concertgebouw Orchestra in Amsterdam which in 2008 received for the first time the title of the best orchestra in the world. October 2010 saw another turn in Prunaru's musical life when he became the musical director of International Menuhin Music Academy in Switzerland, continuing the tradition of his Masters Yehudi Menuhin and Alberto Lysy. He plays on a Stradivari dated 1694, offered by the Concertgebouw's board of sponsors.

== Competition record ==
- 1991 Rodolfo Lipizer IVC, Gorizia - 1st prize.
- 1992 C. Flesch IVC, London - 4th prize.
- 1993 Queen Elisabeth IMC, Brussels - 2nd prize.
- 1997 Seoul IMC - 1st prize (ex-aequo with Ju-Young Baek)
- 1998 Indianapolis IVC - 2nd prize
- 1999 Juilliard Mendelssohn IVC - 1st prize
