= Dorothy DeLay =

American violin instructor (1917–2002)

Background information
- Born: March 31, 1917; Medicine Lodge, Kansas, U.S.
- Died: March 24, 2002 (aged 84) New York City, New York, U.S.
- Genres: Classical
- Occupation: Violin teacher
- Instrument: Violin
- Years active: 1937–2002

Dorothy DeLay (March 31, 1917 – March 24, 2002) was an American violin instructor, primarily at the Juilliard School, Sarah Lawrence College, and the University of Cincinnati.

== Life ==
Dorothy DeLay was born on March 31, 1917, in Medicine Lodge, Kansas to parents who were musicians and teachers. She began studying violin at age 4. At age 14, she graduated from Neodesha High School, where her father was superintendent. DeLay studied for one year at the Oberlin Conservatory with Raymond Cerf, a student of César Thomson, and transferred to broaden her education at Michigan State University, where she earned a B.A. in 1937 at age 20. She then entered the Juilliard Graduate School, where she studied with Louis Persinger, Hans Letz, and Felix Salmond.

She was the founder of the Stuyvesant Trio (1939–42) with her cellist sister Nellis DeLay and pianist Helen Brainard, and she played with Leopold Stokowski's All-American Youth Orchestra. While touring with this orchestra in 1940, she met Edward Newhouse, a novelist and writer for The New Yorker, and they married four months later in 1941. They had a son, Jeffrey Newhouse and a daughter Alison Newhouse Dinsmore.

In addition to many honorary degrees, Miss DeLay received the National Medal of Arts in 1994, the National Music Council's American Eagle Award in 1995, the Sanford Medal from Yale University in 1997 and the Order of the Sacred Treasure from the Japanese Government in 1998. In 1975, she was recognized by the American String Teachers Association (ASTA) with their Artist Teacher Award.

Dorothy DeLay died from cancer in New York City at age 84.

== Teaching ==
By the mid-1940s, DeLay decided that she did not want to continue as a performer. In 1946, she returned to Juilliard to study with Ivan Galamian, becoming his assistant in 1948. In addition to teaching at Juilliard, she taught at Sarah Lawrence College (1947–1987), the University of Cincinnati – College-Conservatory of Music (30 years until 2001), the New England Conservatory, the Meadowmount School of Music and the Aspen Music Festival and School, among others. DeLay's students have gone forward to solo careers, principal orchestra positions with the world's leading orchestras, and have gone on to win many of the major violin competitions of the world.

In a 1992 interview, Nadja Salerno-Sonnenberg said: "I think the greatest thing about Dorothy DeLay is that she has the ability to look at a young student or an old student and pretty much size up their character and the way that they think — their personality, basically — and how in a short period of time what's the best door to use to get them into here. And that's her method — the fact that there is really no method."

Itzhak Perlman said of DeLay's pedagogic approach: "I would come and play for her, and if something was not quite right, it wasn't like she was going to kill me. She would ask questions about what you thought of particular phrases—where the top of the phrase was, and so on. We would have a very friendly, interesting discussion about 'Why do you think it should sound like this?' and 'What do you think of that?' I was not quite used to this way of approaching things."

In 1997, the Dorothy Richard Starling Chair of Violin Studies was established with a leadership grant from the Dorothy Richard Starling Foundation to The Campaign for Juilliard. It was held by DeLay until the time of her death in March 2002, and a year later Itzhak Perlman was appointed to this position at Juilliard.

== Notable pupils ==
- Frank Almond
- Christian Altenburger
- Dmitri Berlinsky
- Vilhelmas Čepinskis
- David Chan
- Sarah Chang
- Robert Chen
- Angèle Dubeau
- Simon Fischer
- Karen Gomyo
- Midori Goto
- Ray Iwazumi
- Hyo Kang
- Paul Kantor
- Laura Kobayashi
- Masao Kawasaki
- Patinka Kopec
- I-Hao Lee
- Nigel Kennedy
- Misha Keylin
- Chin Kim
- David Kim
- Yoon Kwon
- Elizabeth Layton
- Ida Levin
- Brian Lewis
- Li Chuan Yun
- Cho-Liang Lin
- Liu Yang
- Lü Siqing
- Pierre Ménard
- Anne Akiko Meyers
- Anton Miller
- Shlomo Mintz
- Alyssa Park
- Mark Peskanov
- Itzhak Perlman
- Philippe Quint
- Desirée Ruhstrat
- Nadja Salerno-Sonnenberg
- Kurt Sassmannshaus
- Shunsuke Sato
- Gil Shaham
- Akiko Suwanai
- Albert Stern
- Janet Sung
- Fudeko Takahashi
- Naoko Tanaka
- Akiko Tarumoto
- Dezso Vaghy
- Tibor Vaghy
- Gong Qian Yang
- Ayako Yonetani
- Jaap van Zweden
