= Joseph Silverstein =

American violinist and conductor

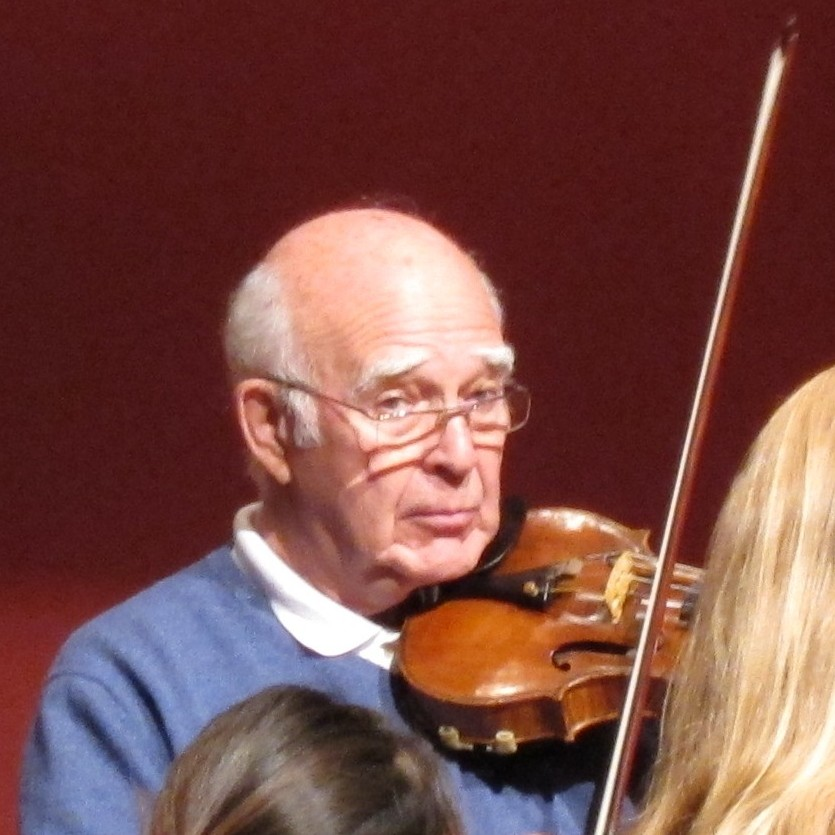
Silverstein in 2011

Joseph Harry Silverstein (March 21, 1932 – November 21, 2015) was an American violinist and conductor.

Known to family, friends and colleagues as "Joey", Silverstein was born in Detroit. As a youth, Silverstein studied with his father, Bernard Silverstein, who was a public school music teacher. He began studies at the Curtis Institute of Music in Philadelphia at age 12. His teachers included Efrem Zimbalist, D.C. Dounis, William Primrose, Josef Gingold, and Mischa Mischakoff. Although he never formally completed his high school education, Silverstein did graduate from Curtis in 1950. Following completion of his studies at Curtis, Silverstein played as a section musician with the Houston Symphony Orchestra, the Philadelphia Orchestra, and the Denver Symphony Orchestra.

In 1955, Silverstein joined the second violin section of Boston Symphony Orchestra (BSO), the youngest musician in the orchestra at the time. In 1959, he won a silver medal at the Queen Elisabeth Music Competition, and in 1960 he won the Naumburg Award from the Walter W. Naumburg Foundation. In 1962, Silverstein became BSO concertmaster, a position he held for 22 years. He was appointed assistant conductor of the BSO in 1971. Whilst in Boston, Silverstein performed with other local ensembles such as the Civic Symphony and Banchetto Musicale. He also taught at the New England Conservatory, Yale University, and Boston University as well as serving on the faculty of the Tanglewood Music Center. Silverstein left the BSO in 1984. In 1973, he conducted and soloed with the Naumburg Orchestral Concerts, in the Naumburg Bandshell, Central Park, in the summer series. He was notably the recital partner of pianist Michele Levin.

Silverstein was music director of the Utah Symphony from 1983 to 1998. He served as acting music director of the Florida Philharmonic Orchestra in 2001 until the orchestra's demise in 2003. He was the artistic advisor to the Portland Symphony Orchestra for the 2007–2008 season. In addition to teaching in Boston, he served as a professor of violin at the Curtis Institute of Music. In 1969, he became a faculty artist at the Sarasota Music Festival. Silverstein performed on a 1742 Guarneri del Gesù.

Silverstein married Adrienne Shufro in 1954. They had two daughters and a son. At the time of his death in 2015, Silverstein's widow, children, and four grandchildren survived him.

== See also ==
- Richard Burgin, concertmaster of the BSO from 1920 to 1962
- Malcolm Lowe, concertmaster of the BSO from 1984 to 2019

Cultural offices
Preceded by James Judd	Acting Music Director, Florida Philharmonic Orchestra; 2001–2003	Succeeded by (no successor)
