= Encore School for Strings =

American summer music institute

Coordinates: 41°14′55″N 81°26′08″W

Encore School for Strings, founded in 1985 by David and Linda Cerone, was the summer session of the Cleveland Institute of Music. It was located in Hudson, Ohio at the Western Reserve Academy. Encore had no minimum age requirement, though a taped audition was used to screen applicants. The music faculty was world-renowned, with teachers from top U.S. music schools including the Cleveland Institute of Music, Curtis Institute of Music, and the Colburn School.

== Notable alumni ==
Violin

- Ray Chen
- Robert Chen
- Hilary Hahn
- Frank Huang
- Judith Ingolfsson
- Leila Josefowicz
- Tamaki Kawakubo
- Soovin Kim
- Lara St. John
- Scott St. John
- Jasper Wood

Cello

- Zuill Bailey

== Notable faculty ==
Violin

- Jascha Brodsky
- David Cerone
- Linda Sharon Cerone
- Robert Lipsett
- William Preucil

Viola

- Robert Vernon

Cello

- Orlando Cole
- Desmond Hoebig
- Eleonore Schoenfeld
- Richard Aaron
