= Giora Schmidt =

American-Israeli violinist

Giora Schmidt גיורא שמידט
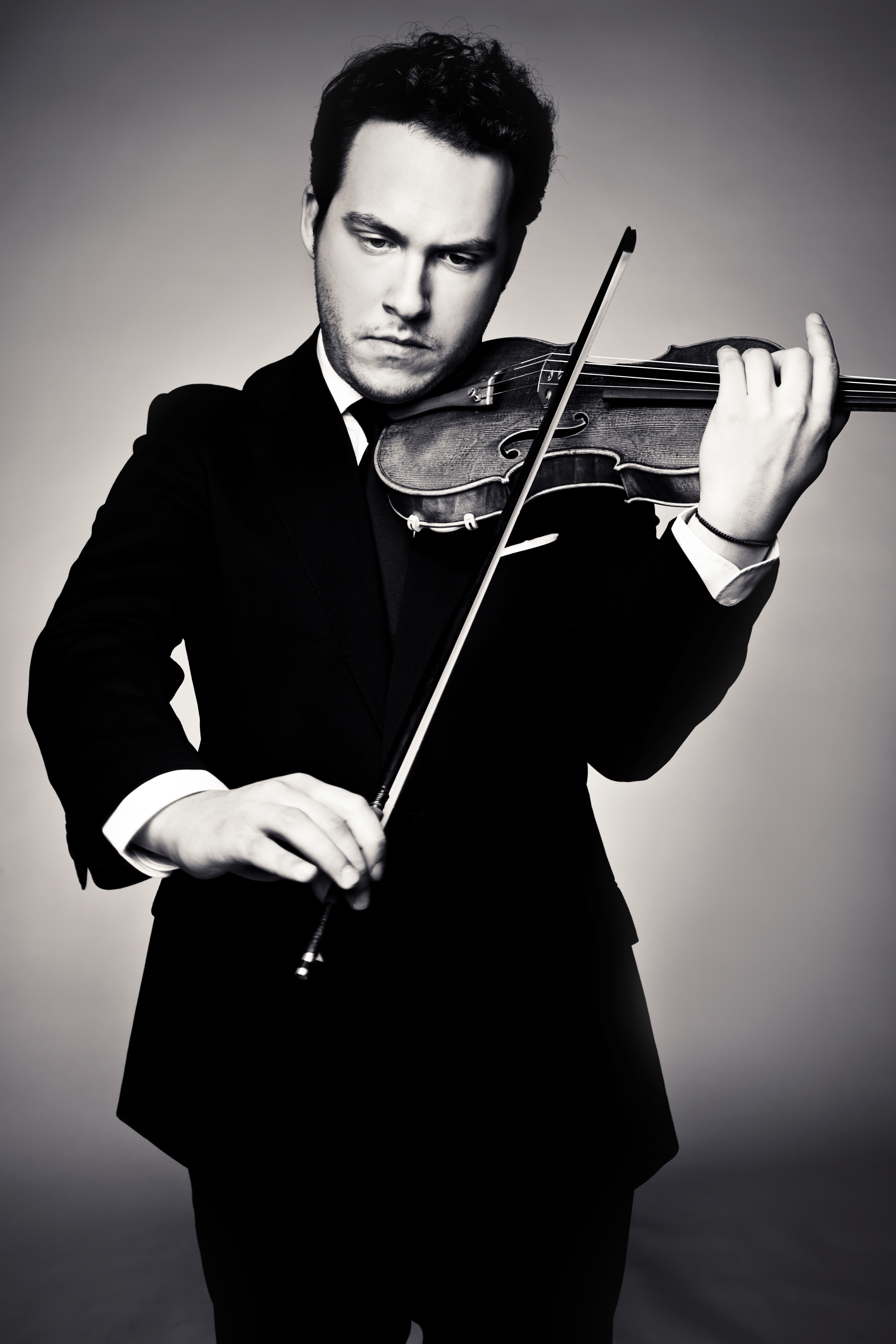
- Schmidt in 2011

Background information
- Born: Philadelphia, Pennsylvania, U.S.
- Genres: Classical
- Occupation: Violinist
- Instrument: Violin
- Website: Instagram Profile Facebook Page Official Website

Giora Schmidt (Hebrew: גיורא שמידט) is an American-Israeli violinist.

== Biography ==
Giora Schmidt was born into a family of musicians in Philadelphia, Pennsylvania. His parents emigrated from Israel in 1978 and played with the Philadelphia Opera Company Orchestra. His mother, Michal Schmidt is a cellist and pianist and is on the faculty of Bryn Mawr and Haverford Colleges and the University of Pennsylvania. His father, Dov Schmidt, is a violinist and businessman.

Schmidt began his violin studies at the age of four, and by 12 was commuting between Philadelphia and New York to study with Patinka Kopec and Pinchas Zukerman at the Manhattan School of Music. Schmidt did not truly become serious until the age of 14 when he began spending summers at the Perlman Music Program in Shelter Island, NY. There he met Itzhak Perlman who invited Schmidt to study with him and the late violin pedagogue Dorothy DeLay at the Juilliard Pre-College.

In between his lessons in New York, Schmidt worked intensely with violinist Geoffrey Michaels on scales, etudes and the Sonatas and Partitas of Johann Sebastian Bach – in the tradition of Efrem Zimbalist and Oscar Shumsky.

At 18, Schmidt entered the Juilliard School where he continued his studies with Perlman and DeLay, graduating in 2004. From 2004–2006 he was chosen to be a Starling Fellow where he taught as Itzhak Perlman's assistant at the Juilliard School.

He has appeared as soloist with numerous symphony orchestras around the globe including Cleveland, Philadelphia, Chicago, Detroit, Toronto, Vancouver, National Symphony Orchestra of Cuba, Orquesta Filarmónica de la UNAM (Mexico City), Orquesta Sinfonica de Chile, Sendai Philharmonic and the Israel Philharmonic. In February 2003, he made his Carnegie Hall debut performing the Barber Violin Concerto with the New York Youth Symphony

In recital and chamber music, Schmidt has performed at Carnegie Hall, The Kennedy Center, The Metropolitan Museum of Art in New York, San Francisco Performances, the Louvre Museum in Paris, and Tokyo's Musashino Cultural Hall. His festival appearances include the Ravinia Festival, the Santa Fe and Montreal Chamber Music Festivals, Bard Music Festival, Scotia Festival of Music and Music Academy of the West. He has collaborated with such acclaimed musicians as Itzhak Perlman, Pinchas Zukerman, Yefim Bronfman, Lynn Harrell, Anne Sofie von Otter, Ralph Kirshbaum and Michael Tree.

Committed to education and sharing his passion for music, Schmidt is currently on the Artist Faculty at New York University (NYU Steinhardt), and Orford Musique Academie (Quebec) in the summers. Previously, he was on the faculty at the University of Cincinnati - College-Conservatory of Music (CCM), The Juilliard School and the Perlman Music Program. Through technology and social media he regularly seeks out new ways of reaching young violinists and music lovers around the world.

Schmidt plays a c.1830 violin by Giuseppe Rocca and bows by Sartory, Hill and contemporary makers Paolo Pamiro and David Samuels.

== Honors ==
- 2005: Classical Recording Foundation's Samuel Sanders Award, presented to him by Itzhak Perlman at Carnegie Hall.
- 2004–2006: Starling Fellowship, The Juilliard School
- 2003: Avery Fisher Career Grant
- 2001: First Prize, Concerto Competition at the Music Academy of the West
- 2000: First Prize, Philadelphia Orchestra Greenfield Competition

== Recordings ==
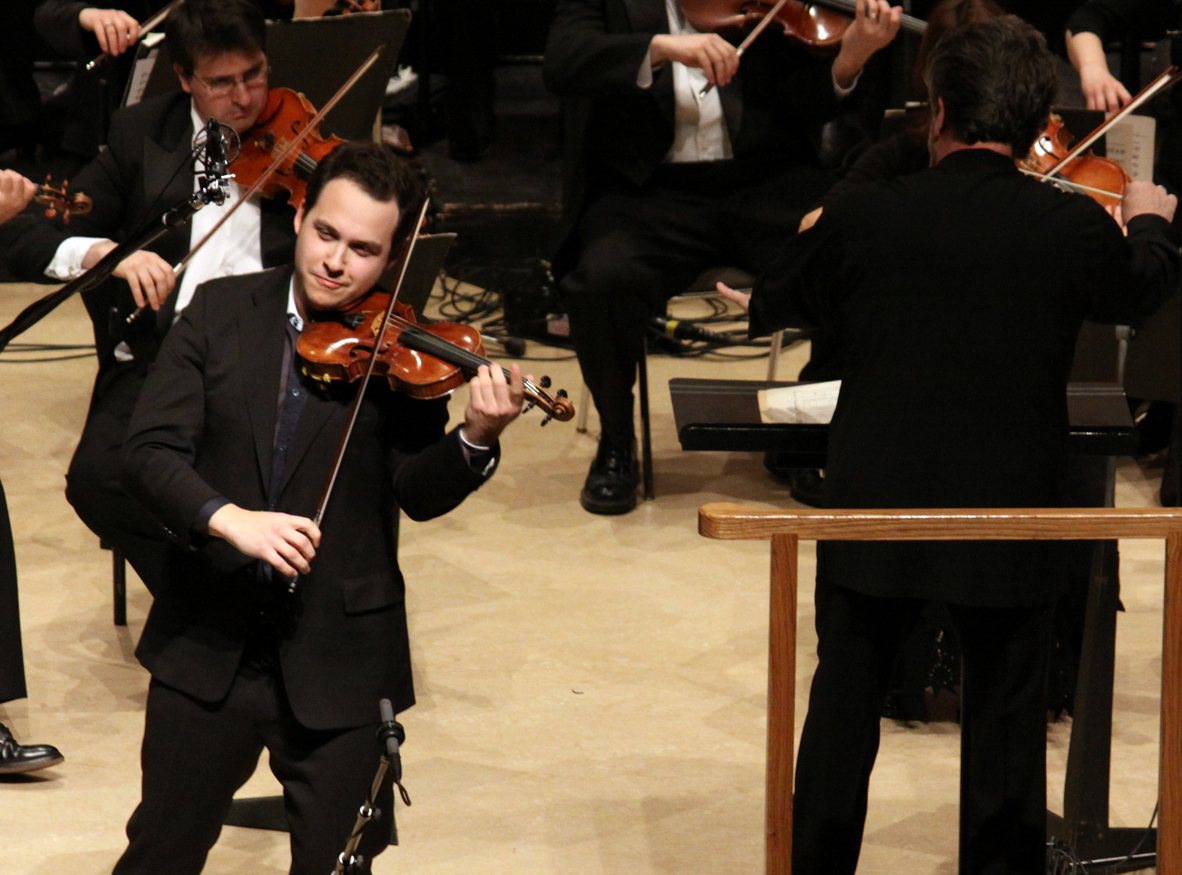
Schmidt Performing in Nova Scotia, May 2010

- Giora Schmidt Live from Miami (May 2010)
  Works by Tartini, Brahms, Debussy, Ravel, Kreisler, & de Falla
  Giora Schmidt (violin)
  Rohan de Silva (piano)
- Schubert & Shostakovich Piano Trios (October 2008)
  Navah Perlman (piano)
  Giora Schmidt (violin)
  Zuill Bailey (cello)
- Vocalise (September 2007)
  Works by Vivaldi, de Falla, Philip Lasser, Franck & Wieniawski
  Giora Schmidt (violin)
  Rohan de Silva (piano)
- Live From El Paso Pro-Musica (February 2007)
  Works by Arensky & Dohnányi
  Giora Schmidt (violin)
  Soovin Kim (violin)
  Kirsten Johnson (viola)
  Lynn Harrell (cello)
  Zuill Bailey (cello)

== Media ==
- "It's a digital life for a man with an analog soul" Lansing City Pulse
- Las Vegas Philharmonic Radio Preview 88.9 KNPR
- "Young violinist strives to bring back the Golden Age" South Florida Classical Review
- "The student becomes the master" Sarasota Herald Tribune
- "Violinist Schmidt, called a prodigy, hits recital trail" San Francisco Chronicle
- "A conversation with Giora Schmidt" Roanoke Times
