= Orlando Cole =

American cello teacher (1908–2010)

- Born: August 16, 1908; Philadelphia, Pennsylvania, U.S.
- Died: January 25, 2010 (aged 101)
- Genre: Classical
- Occupation: Musical performer
- Instrument: Cello
- Years active: 1927–2008

Orlando Cole (August 16, 1908 – January 25, 2010) was an American cello teacher who taught two generations of soloists, chamber musicians, and first cellists in a dozen leading orchestras, including David Cole, Lynn Harrell, Jonah Kim, Ronald Leonard, Lorne Munroe, Peter Stumpf and Marcy Rosen.

== Early life ==
Born and raised in Philadelphia, the son of Lucius Cole, a violinist in the Philadelphia Orchestra, he entered the first class of the Curtis Institute of Music in 1924 as a pupil of Felix Salmond and graduated in 1934. He was a founding member in 1927 of what was then known as the Swastika Quartet. In 1932, shortly before Adolf Hitler's election and adoption of this symbol (albeit rotated), the fledgling quartet renamed itself as the Curtis String Quartet after the school's founder, Mary Louise Curtis.

== Collaboration with Samuel Barber ==
During this time, Cole was a classmate and friend of the composer Samuel Barber, who dedicated his Cello Sonata, op. 6 to Cole. Mr. Cole and the composer collaborated closely on its composition, reading a page at a time as it was written, until they gave the work its premiere in New York's Town Hall in 1933. Barber wrote also wrote his Quartet, op. 11, with its famous adagio, for the Curtis Quartet.

The ensemble played this work from manuscript for several years, and it was only when the time of publication arrived that Barber chose to make major changes: the first movement was shortened significantly, with its coda ultimately becoming the finale of what is now the third movement, and the original contrapuntal third movement was abandoned entirely in favor of a reprise of the first movement's basic thematic material.

In the years since, several ensembles have sought to perform this original version, but Barber's longtime companion, Gian Carlo Menotti, the holder of his copyrights, forbade it. Barber acknowledged to Cole in a letter accompanying the manuscript score sent from Rome attesting to the composer's great confidence in the slow movement. The quartet's first performance of the work in Curtis Hall is testament to the same - so rapturous was the audience's response following the adagio that the ensemble was compelled to encore it right away before continuing on to the finale. Samuel Barber also composed for the Curtis String Quartet his work for voice and string quartet, Dover Beach, set to the lyric verse of the same name by Matthew Arnold. The vocal line was originally sung by Rose Bampton in its premiere in Curtis Hall and recorded in this form, but as the composer was dissatisfied with the work's dramatic impact given the male personage of the text, Samuel Barber chose to sing it himself for its recording in 1935. An earlier piece, the Serenade, was also written for the Curtis String Quartet, though it fell quickly from the composer's favor and is rarely played today.

== The Curtis Quartet ==
The Curtis String Quartet was a pioneer in its time and earned great acclaim: as the foremost string quartet in America during the prewar years; the first touring quartet to be trained entirely in the United States; and as the first American quartet to tour Europe, including a command performance before Mary of Teck, Queen Consort of George V of the United Kingdom. The ensemble undertook two extensive and triumphant tours of the United Kingdom and the European continent during the seasons 1936-37 and 1937–38, and were scheduled to continue the same until the outbreak of World War II.

At a time when gramophone recordings were still a rarity and chamber music had not yet taken hold in the United States, the Curtis String Quartet served as ambassadors, giving over 5000 concerts in its career and often presenting the first quartet performances heard by the communities in which they played. Before disbanding in 1981 due to the death of Max Aronoff, the founding nucleus of Brodsky, Aronoff, and Cole remained intact. The quartet was formalized in 1932 with members Jascha Brodsky, Benjamin Sharlip, Max Aronoff, and Cole, but shortly after, Sharlip resigned and they engaged Charles Jaffe as their second violinist; it was with him that they achieved many of the aforementioned milestones.

Cole's primary instrument, the 1739 'Sleeping Beauty' by Domenico Montagnana, was a gift to him which had been purchased for $17,000 in 1952. It was with this instrument that the Curtis String Quartet's best known recordings for Westminster Records were made, among them Dvořák's American Quartet and Smetana's Quartet in E Minor From My Life; Mendelssohn quartets, opp. 12 and 44, no. 1; Schumann quartets, op. 41, nos. 1 and 3; Debussy and Ravel quartets; the Franck Piano Quintet; and two works of Ernő Dohnányi, the Quartet in Db-Major, and the Piano Quintet No. 2. In the two works with piano, the Curtis String Quartet was joined by their longtime friend and collaborator, the pianist Vladimir Sokoloff.

== Teaching career ==
Cole taught at the Curtis Institute of Music for seventy-five years, first as Salmond's assistant while still a student and then in succession of his own teacher. There was a brief gap in his tenure at the school, however, during the years following World War II. The members of the quartet had grown dissatisfied with certain of the objectives and policies of the school and decided to found their own institution for the training of chamber and orchestral musicians, called the New School of Music which was located just a few blocks from Curtis and, for more than thirty years, served as an important training center.

After returning to their duties at Curtis in 1953, Cole and the members of the quartet taught concurrently at both schools. After the 1981 death of the ensemble's violist, Max Aronoff, who was also director of the New School, the school was absorbed into Temple University where Cole and Brodsky continued to teach.

Cole gave master-classes all over the world. In 2005 he was appointed to the emeritus faculty of the Curtis Institute. He died on January 25, 2010, aged 101.

== Honors ==
In 1986, Cole received an honorary "Doctor of Music" from the Curtis Institute of Music of Philadelphia, and in 1990 was honored by the American String Teachers Association as "Teacher of the Year". Mr. Cole was also honored by the Philadelphia Art Alliance and the venerable Musical Fund Society of Philadelphia. In 1999 he was given the first award by the Curtis alumni.

Cole helped to found the Encore School for Strings in Hudson, Ohio, along with David Cerone, who had left his position as violin teacher at Curtis to assume the directorship of the Cleveland Institute of Music.
