= Vladimir Sokoloff (pianist) =

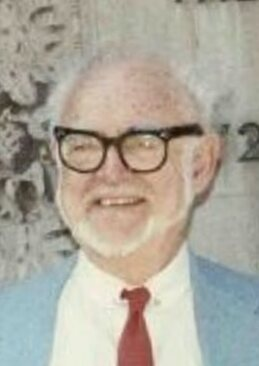
- Vladimir Sokoloff, in 1984

Background information
- Born: February 21, 1913; New York City, New York, U.S.
- Died: October 27, 1997 (aged 84) Philadelphia, Pennsylvania, U.S.
- Genre: Classical
- Instrument: Piano

Vladimir Sokoloff (February 21, 1913 – October 27, 1997) was an American pianist and accompanist on the faculty of the Curtis Institute of Music. In addition to his teaching work with the accompanying, piano and chamber music students, he was an active performer.

== Life ==
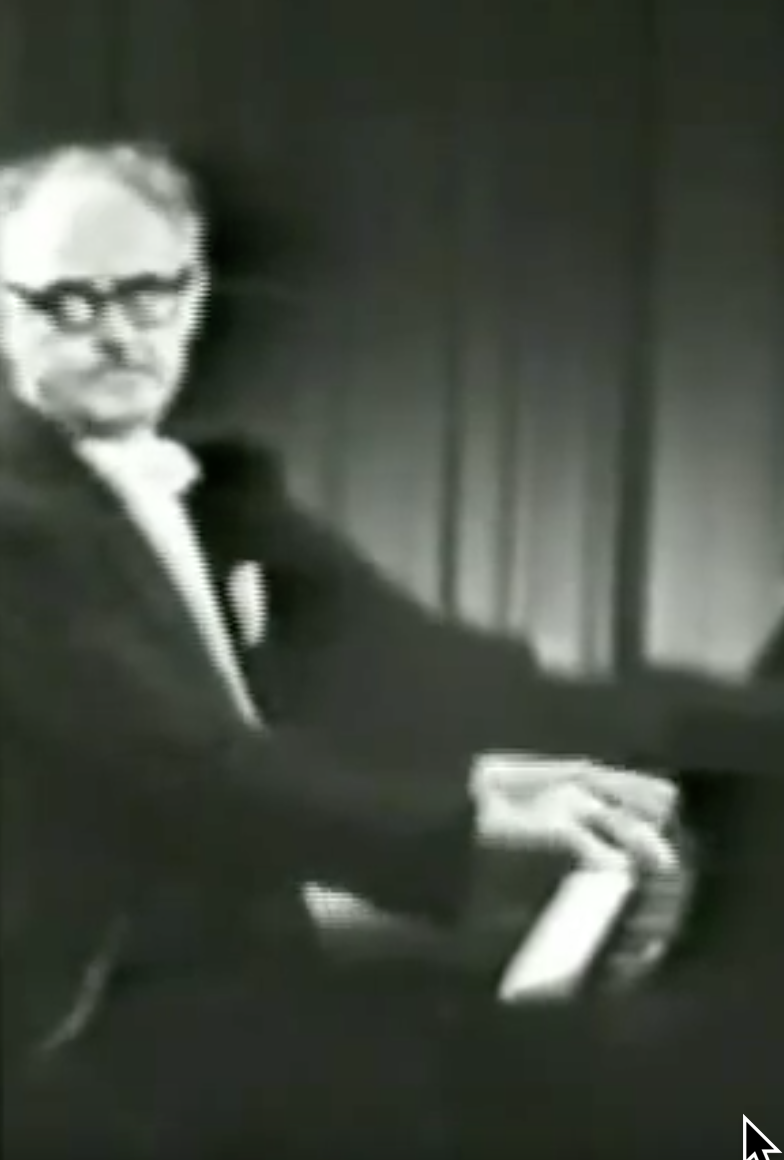
Vladimir Sokoloff

Born in New York in 1913, Sokoloff entered the Curtis Institute in Philadelphia in 1929, studying with Abram Chasins, Harry Kaufman and Louis Bailly. He joined the faculty in 1936. In 1942, he took part in the founding of the New School (in Philadelphia, now the Esther Boyer School of Music at Temple University) with his colleagues, Jascha Brodsky, Max Aronoff and Orlando Cole.

From 1938 to 1950, he was pianist for the Philadelphia Orchestra. As a recital accompanist and pianist with a career of over 70 years, his repertoire spanned all instrumental and vocal genres and styles. Sokoloff collaborated with such artists as the violinists Efrem Zimbalist, (with whom he had a 27-year collaboration, accompanying recitals all over the world), Jaime Laredo, Aaron Rosand; violists William Primrose and Joseph di Pasquale; the cellists Gregor Piatigorsky and Emanuel Feuermann; flautist Julius Baker, William Kincaid, oboist Marcel Tabuteau, and soprano Marcella Sembrich.

== Family and private life ==
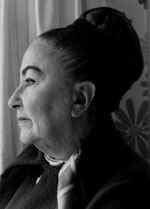
Eleanor Sokoloff

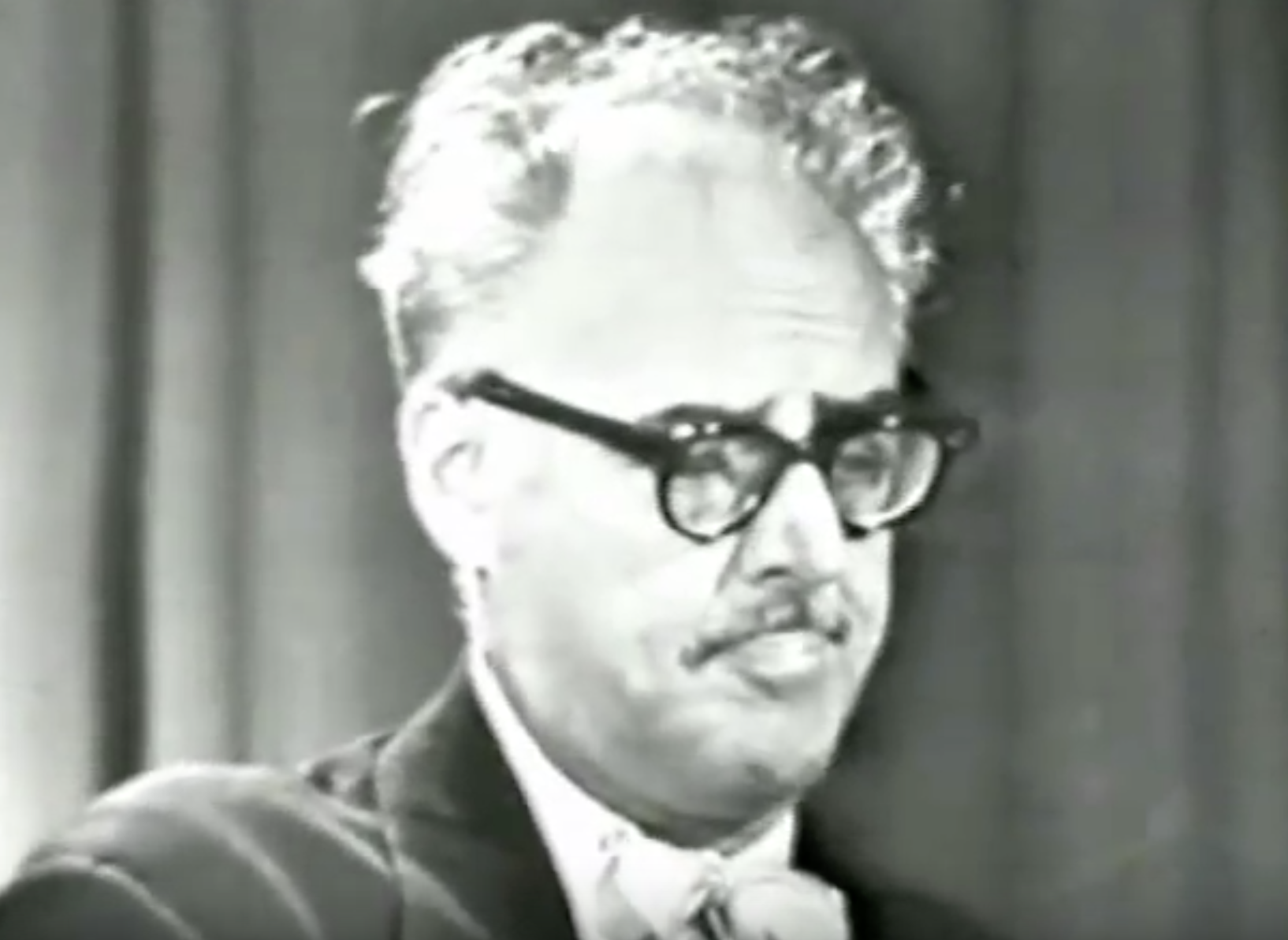
Vladimir Sokoloff

Vladimir Sokoloff was a cousin of composer Noel Sokoloff. He was a nephew of conductor Nikolai Sokoloff. Another first cousin was pianist Theodore Saidenberg.

Sokoloff was married to pianist Eleanor Blum who at age 105 was still on the faculty of Curtis. The couple performed as a duo until the birth of their daughters: Kathy, director of development at the Settlement Music School, and Laurie, principal piccolo player with the Baltimore Symphony Orchestra, and professor at the Peabody Institute of the Johns Hopkins University.

Vladimir Sokoloff died in 1997 in Philadelphia, aged 84, after a long illness.

== Efrem Zimbalist ==
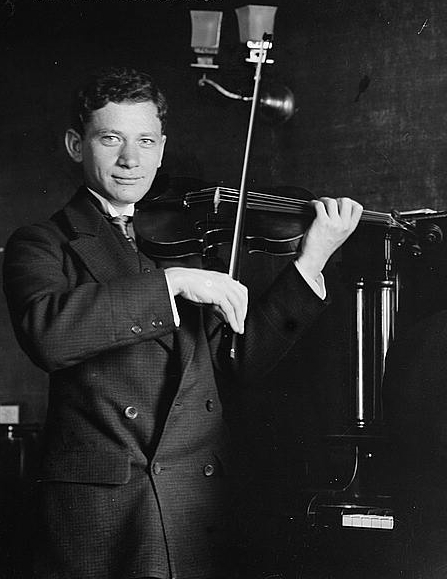
Efrem Zimbalist playing violin

Zimbalist used to tour the world with the accompanist Theodore Saidenberg. When Saidenberg resigned to pursue a solo career, his place "was taken by his cousin, Vladimir Sokoloff, who had been acting as Zimbalist's class accompanist. On early U.S. tours Zimbalist had performed with Sokoloff's uncle Nikolai, founder and first conductor of the Cleveland Orchestra. Vladimir (or "Billy", as Zimbalist called him) remained with him for the rest of his concert career – some thirty years – excepting the period Sokoloff spent in Special Services during World War II. Sokoloff remembered how things started: 'It was so casual. I was just playing my regular schedule in the studio when he said, "Would you like to be my accompanist?" I was flabbergasted - never in my wildest dreams did I think I would be asked to fill so important a post. I was a young kid and had had no experience except playing in school and a few outside concerts that had been arranged for me. The end of August I went up to The Rafters, and we rehearsed solidly for two weeks.'

Roy Malan said: "Shortly after starting to work with Zimbalist they performed ... Saint-Saëns's "Le cygne". Zimbalist liked to hold the final G of the solo part to the very end, in one bow, while the piano brings the piece to a close .... After Sokoloff's initial performance Zimbalist, in his gentle way, admonished him for playing the concluding arpeggio too quickly ... His pianist confessed to a fear of stretching the bow beyond its limit. 'Billy', Zimbalist smiled, 'I'll bet you $5 you can't play the ending slowly enough to make me run out of bow.' The next evening violinist and pianist exchanged glances before 'Le cygne'. when Zimbalist embarked on his last note Sokoloff jammed on the brakes, seeming to grind almost to a torturous halt on each note he played. Very pleased with himself, after what seemed an eternity he finally reached the cadence. Looking up, to his astonishement he saw Zimbalist, a scarcely concealed smirk on his face, comfortably sustaining at mid-bow. Sokoloff was $5 poorer."

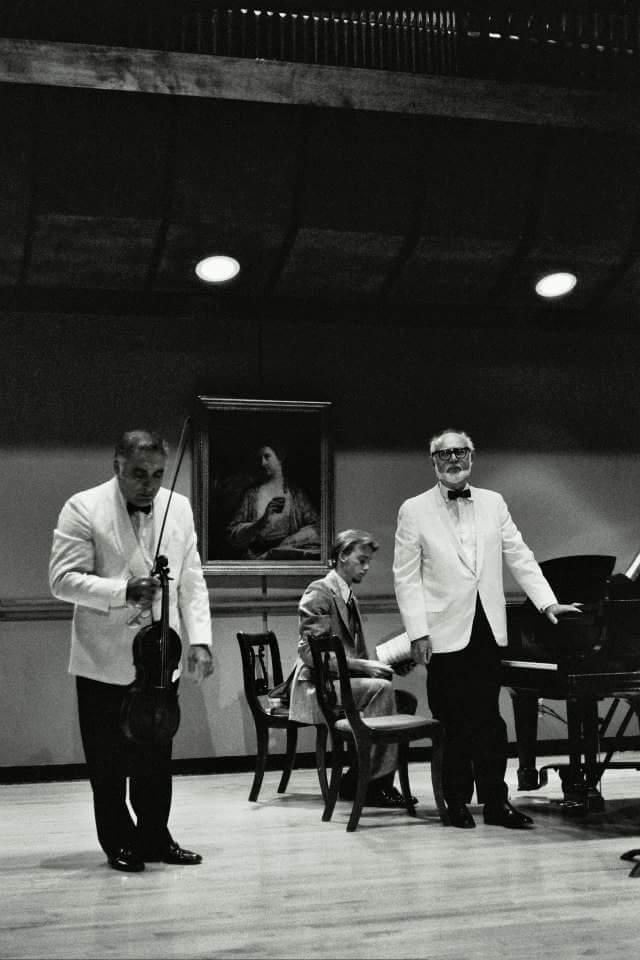
Joseph de Pasquale and Vladimir Sokoloff, after premiering the George Rochberg Sonata at the 1979 Viola Congress in Provo, Utah

== Appreciation ==
Joseph Rezits wrote the following recollection of Sokoloff:

When I first entered the Curtis Institute in 1942, 1 was barely seventeen and eagerly searching for the path to excellence, strongly influenced by what I observed and heard. Hearing his absolutely superlative playing, with unfailingly impeccable taste and immaculate ensemble, whetted my appetite for ensemble music, the medium in which I ultimately specialized. I also was continuously impressed with his ability to learn scores with incredible rapidity and to do this by practicing a few minutes here and a few minutes there. He made maximum use of his time and proved that long warm-ups on both the physiological and psychological levels were not always possible or even necessary. ... The collaborating pianist must always be aware of his partners 'weak spots' or idiosyncrasies. The most vivid memory of a pianist's 'savoir faire' in this respect dates back to my student days at the Curtis Institute. Vladimir Sokoloff, the faculty accompanist and ensemble player, was playing for an older member of the faculty who, although retaining artistic powers of a high order, was somewhat, shall we say, in less than prime condition technically. The Wieniawski Violin Concerto was the major work in the program. One of the most difficult passages for the violin in the first movement is a melodic minor one-octave scale in fingered octaves. This passage is preceded by a similar one, an octave lower, in the piano (or orchestra). In hearing the described scale passage on the piano, I was startled to note that it was played with much hesitancy – almost as if the pianist were struggling to get to the end. When I heard the violinist continue the passage into the upper octave, I knew immediately why Sokoloff had done this. Understanding full well that the violinist would have great difficulty with the fingered octaves, Sokoloff had incorporated the anticipated problem in his own part – giving the whole passage a certain interpretative validity. It was an astounding experience, and one that I shall never forget.

== Students at the Curtis Institute ==
Sokoloff's most famous non-classical student was Nina Simone, who was not admitted to Curtis as a piano Student despite Sokoloff's efforts on her behalf. Other students included Ruth Butterfield, Ruth Crane Friedberg, Thomas Jaber, Robert Koenig,Joan Lippincott, Alan Morrison, Chie Nagatani, Orlando Otey, Ghenady Meirson, Norman Mittelmann, Eytan Pessen, Paul Romero, Barry Snyder, Susan Starr, Nozomi Takashima and Christi Zuniga.

== Encounter with Nina Simone ==
On Nina Simone: "She was not a genius, but she had great talent. I accepted her on the basis of her talent, and with the understanding that I would prepare her for [another] audition at Curtis. It was during that early period that she demonstrated, at one lesson, her ability to play jazz. I remember distinctly telling her, 'why don't you pursue this as your profession?' And she said, 'Oh no, my first love is classical music and I want to be a pianist'."

== Selected discography ==
- Dohnanyi, Curtis String Quartet, Vladimir Sokoloff, Westminster XWN 18514, 1957
- Scriabin, The Philadelphia Orchestra, Eugene Ormandy, Gilbert Johnson, Vladimir Sokoloff, RCA SB 6854, 1971
- Mason Jones, Vladimir Sokoloff, Music for French Horn, Music Minus One, MMO 8044, 1973
- Mason Jones, Vladimir Sokoloff, Music for French Horn, Music Minus One, MMO 8047, 1973
- William Kincaid, Vladimir Sokoloff, Philadelphia Orchestra Solo Flutist: Platti, Handel, Bach, Mozart, Gluck, SKU BR1058 Boston Records, N.D.
- Camilla Williams, Al Goodman and his orchestra (Rib), Guild Choristers, 'Summertime' 'Raphsody in Blue'(Gershwin), RCA Victor 46-0004, 78 mono, 1947?
- Al Goodman and his orchestra, Träumerei & Undercurrent,(Brahms theme from 3rd Symphony) RCA Victor 46-0008, 78 mono, 1947?
