= Geoffrey Michaels =

Australian violinist and violist (1944–2024)

- Born: 19 June 1944; Perth, Western Australia
- Died: 17 February 2024 (aged 79) Voorhees Township, New Jersey, United States
- Occupation: Violinist
- Instrument: Violin • viola
- Spouse(s): Patricia Walmsley Beverly McCoy (m. 1978–2024)

Geoffrey Michaels (19 June 1944 – 17 February 2024) was an Australian violinist and violist. A child prodigy in Australia during the 1950s, he performed and taught primarily in the United States.

== Early life and education ==
Born in 1944 in Western Australia, Michaels began taking violin lessons at the age of five, and soon was recognized as a prodigy. At 14, he became the youngest performer ever to win the Australian Broadcasting Commission's concerto competition, and made his first recording, which sold out within weeks of its release.

At the age of 16 he went to the United States to attend the Curtis Institute of Music, where he studied violin with Efrem Zimbalist, and violin and viola with Oscar Shumsky.

== Career ==
While still a student he became a member of the Curtis String Quartet. He then pursued a solo career, winning the fourth annual Emma Feldman Competition in Philadelphia, and placing among the finalists in the Long-Thibaud-Crespin Competition in Paris, the Queen Elizabeth Competition in Brussels, and the Tchaikovsky Competition in Moscow, where he played Zimbalist's "Coq d'Or Fantasy".

Michaels was a professor at Florida State University and the University of British Columbia, and also maintained teaching affiliations with The New School of Music, Princeton University and Swarthmore College.

== Performances ==
Notable contemporary concerto performances include the US premiere of Alfred Schnittke’s Concerto Grosso (broadcast on Voice of America), and Arvo Pärt's Tabula Rasa for Two Violins and Strings and Fratres, both at Lincoln Center in New York City.

During his many tours of Australia, he collaborated with pianist and composer Roger Smalley. Smalley's "Trio for Violin, Cello, and Piano" (1990–91), commissioned by the Melbourne International Chamber Music Competition, bears the dedication "To Geoffrey Michaels".

Michaels was a founding member of the Liebesfreud Quartet, and also performed in many other chamber ensembles, including the Janus Piano Trio, Performers' Committee for Twentieth Century Music (New York), Richardson Chamber Players (Princeton), and Vancouver New Music Society.

== Death ==
Geoffrey Michaels died on 17 February 2024, aged 79, at the Samaritan Center in Voorhees Township, New Jersey, from complications of Parkinson's disease.
