= Zuill Bailey =

American cellist (born 1972)

- Born: April 24, 1972 (age 54)
- Origin: Woodbridge, Virginia, U.S.
- Genre: Classical
- Occupation: Cellist
- Instrument: Cello
- Years active: 1996 – present
- Labels: Telarc, ASV, Delos, Zenph Studios
- Website: zuillbailey.com

James Zuill Bailey, better known as Zuill Bailey (born April 24, 1972) is an American Grammy Award-winning cello soloist, chamber musician, and artistic director. A graduate of the Peabody Institute of the Johns Hopkins University and the Juilliard School, he has appeared in recital and with major orchestras internationally. He is a professor of cello and Director of the Center for Entrepreneurship at the University of Texas at El Paso. Bailey’s extensive recording catalogue are released on TELARC, Avie, Steinway and Sons, Octave, Delos, Albany, Sono Luminus, Naxos, Azica, Concord, EuroArts, ASV, Oxingale and Zenph Studios.

== Biography ==
As a concerto soloist, Bailey has performed with over 200 symphony orchestras worldwide. These symphony orchestras include the Chicago, Dallas, Los Angeles, San Francisco, Philharmonia UK, Buenos Aires Philharmonic, Buffalo, Nashville Symphony, Borusan Orchestra - Turkey, Ft. Worth, Orquesta Sinfonica Nacional de Colombia, Colorado Symphony, Louisville, Athens State Orchestra Greece, Milwaukee, Estonian National Symphony, Minnesota, North Carolina, Toronto, and Utah. He has collaborated with conductors Alan Gilbert, Neemi Jarvi, Andrew Litton, Grant Llewellyn, Itzhak Perlman, James De Preist, Giancarlo Guerrero, Christoph Eschenbach and Stanisław Skrowaczewski, and has performed with the pianists Awadagin Pratt, Marc-Andre Hamelin, Leon Fleisher, the Juilliard String Quartet, the violinist Jaime Laredo, and cellists Lynn Harrell and Janos Starker.

In his sold-out New York recital debut, Bailey performed the complete Beethoven sonatas with pianist Simone Dinnerstein at the Metropolitan Museum of Art. He has appeared at the Teatro Colon- Argentina, Walt Disney Concert Hall, Kennedy Center, Alice Tully Hall, JAZZ at Lincoln Center, the 92nd Street Y, and Carnegie Hall, where he made his debut performing the U.S. premiere of Mikis Theodorakis' Rhapsody for Cello and Orchestra.

His international appearances include notable performances with the Moscow Chamber Orchestra in its 50th-anniversary tour of Russia as well as concerts in Australia, the Dominican Republic, France, Greece, Estonia, Spain, South Africa, Hong Kong, Israel, Jordan, Mexico, South America and the United Kingdom. Festival appearances include Ravinia, the Interlochen Center for the Arts, Manchester Cello Festival (UK), Wimbledon (UK), Consonances-St. Nazareth FRANCE, Australian Festival of Chamber Music, Deia Music Festival- Mallorca (Spain), Montreal- Canada, Santa Fe, Caramoor, Chautauqua, Bravo! Vail Valley, Maverick Concert Series and the Music Academy of the West. In addition he was the featured soloist performing the Elgar Cello Concerto at the Bard Festival in the World Premiere of the Doug Varrone Dance Company performance of Victorious.

An international recording artist with over thirty eight titles, Mr. Bailey’s discography includes recordings of the Bach Cello Suites and the Britten Cello Symphony/Sonata with pianist Natasha Paremski. Both of which reached the Number One spot on the Classical Billboard Charts. Other releases include the compete works for cello and piano of Brahms, Beethoven and Barber in addition to concertos of Prokofiev, Tchaikovsky, Shostakovich, Dvorak, Elgar, Haydn, Schumann, Korngold, Saint Saens, Walton, Strauss Don Quixote, Bloch Schelomo, Brahms Double, Beethoven Triple and the world premiere recordings of the Muhly, Zwillich, Knehans, Gilbertson, Lippencott, Abels and Daugherty works for cello and orchestra.

Kalmus Music Masters have published "Zuill Bailey Performance Editions" which will encompass the core repertoire of cello literature.

Network television appearances include a recurring role on the HBO series, Oz, in addition to features on NBC, A&E, NHK in Japan, a live broadcast of the Beethoven Triple Concerto from Mexico City, and the televised production of the Cuban premiere of Victor Herbert's Cello Concerto No. 2 with the National Orchestra of Cuba. He has been heard on NPR's Performance Today and Tiny Desk Concert series, Saint Paul Sunday, BBC's In Tune, XM Radio's Live from Studio II, SiriusXM Satellite Radio, TEDx, and RTHK Radio Hong Kong.

Zuill Bailey performs on the 1693 “rosette” Matteo Goffriller Cello, formerly owned by Mischa Schneider of the Budapest String Quartet and two rare examples of Dominique Peccatte Cello Bows circa 1840. In addition to extensive touring engagements, Bailey is the Artistic Director of El Paso Pro Musica, ClassicsNorthWest in Spokane WA, the Sitka Music Festival, Juneau Jazz & Classics, the Mesa Arts Center and Professor of Cello and Director of the Center for Arts Entrepreneurship at the University of Texas at El Paso.

In 2014, Johns Hopkins honored Zuill Bailey as their distinguished alumni and in 2016, Bailey was nominated for and won a Grammy award in the category of Best Classical Instrumental Solo for his recording of American composer Michael Daugherty's cello concerto Tales of Hemingway, recorded by the Nashville Symphony; the composition also garnered Grammys in the categories of Best Contemporary Classical Composition and Best Classical Compendium.

== Discography ==
- Abels “Rhapsody on Omar” for Cello and Orchestra, SpoletoUSA Festival Orchestra, Zuill Bailey (cello) (2027)
- Knehans Cello Concerto, Royal Scottish National Orchestra, Zuill Bailey (cello) (2027)
- Gilbertson Cello Concerto, Dubuque Symphony Orchestra, Zuill Bailey (cello) (2027)
- Lippencott Cello Concerto, Cheyenne Symphony Orchestra, Zuill Bailey (cello) (2027)
- Zwillich Cello Concerto, Santa Rosa Symphony, Zuill Bailey (cello) (2021) Delos
- Bach Cello Suites, LP version, Zuill Bailey (cello), (2022) Octave Records
- Bach Cello Suites, Two Volumes, Zuill Bailey (cello), (2021) Octave Records
- Walton Cello Concerto, Strauss Don Quixote, NC Symphony, Zuill Bailey (cello), Roberto Diaz (viola) (2020) Steinway and Sons
- Schumann Cello Concerto, Brahms Double, Bloch and Bruch, NC Symphony, Philharmonia UK, Zuill Bailey (cello), Philippe Quint (violin) (2019) Steinway and Sons
- Haydn Cello Concertos, Philharmonia UK, Zuill Bailey (cello) (2018) Steinway and Sons
- Brahms Sextets, Cypress String Quartet, Zuill Bailey (cello), Barry Shiffman (viola) (2017) Avie
- Prokofiev Sinfonia Concertante and Cello Sonata, Zuill Bailey (cello), NC Symphony, Natasha Paremski (piano) (2017) Steinway and Sons
- Daugherty Tales of Hemingway for Cello and Orchestra (2016), Zuill Bailey (cello) Naxos
- Schumann Cello Concerto, Beethoven Kreutzer Quintet, Zuill Bailey (cello), Ying String Quartet (2016) Sono Luminus
- Barber, Bernstein, Foss and Copland works for cello and piano (2016), Zuill Bailey (cello), Lara Downes (piano) Steinway and Sons
- Schubert Arpeggione Sonata, Falla, Leisner, Gluck, Saint Saens, Villa Lobos and Paganini for cello and guitar, Zuill Bailey (cello), David Leisner (guitar) (2015) Azica Records
- Bloch Schelomo and Muhly Cello Concerto (2014), Zuill Bailey (cello) Indianapolis Symphony. Steinway and Sons
- Britten Cello Symphony and Cello Sonata (2014), Zuill Bailey (cello), NC Symphony, Natasha Paremski (piano) Telarc
- Emily Bear DIVERSITY, Zuill Bailey (cello) (2014) Concord
- Elgar Cello Concerto, (2013), Zuill Bailey (cello) Indianapolis Symphony. Telarc
- Beethoven Triple Concerto, ‘’’(2010), Israel Philharmonic, Zuill Bailey (cello), Itzhak Perlman (conductor) Navah Perlman (piano) and violinist Giora Schmidt (2010) DVD. EuroArts
- Dvořák Cello Concerto, (2012), Zuill Bailey (cello) Indianapolis Symphony. Telarc
- The Spanish Masters, Manuel De Falla (2011), Zuill Bailey (cello) Zenph Studios
- Brahms Sonatas and Songs, (2011), Zuill Bailey (cello), Awadagin Pratt (piano) Telarc
- Bach Cello Suites, 2 CD set (2010), Zuill Bailey (cello) Telarc
- Beethoven: Zuill Bailey and Simone Dinnerstein, 2 CD set (2009), Zuill Bailey (cello), Simone Dinnerstein (piano)
- Bach and Friends DVD, Zuill Bailey (cello) (2009)
- Russian Masterworks CD (pieces by Tchaikovsky and Shostakovich with San Francisco Ballet Orchestra, (2009), Zuill Bailey (cello) Telarc
- Piano trios by Schubert and Shostakovich, with pianist Navah Perlman and violinist Giora Schmidt, (2008). Telarc CD
- Arensky & Dohnanyi: with Special Guest Lynn Harrell, (2007), Giora Schmidt (violin), Kirsten Johnson (viola), Zuill Bailey (cello), Soovin Kim (violin), Lynn Harrell (cello) Delos
- Saint-Saëns Cello Concertos with the Roanoke Symphony Orchestra, (2005), Zuill Bailey (cello) Delos
- Janos Starker Celebration - Schubert & Boccherini, (2005), Janos Starker (cello), Kirsten Johnson (viola), Zuill Bailey (cello), Soovin Kim (violin), Kurt Nikkanen (violin) Delos
- Zuill Bailey: Debut Solo CD, (2003), Zuill Bailey (cello)
- Erich Wolfgang Korngold: Cello Concerto, (2003), Zuill Bailey (cello), Bruckner Orchestra Linz/Caspar Richter, ASV
- The Rose Album, performing David Popper's Requiem for Three Cellos and Piano opus 66, with cellists Matt Haimovitz and Sara Sant'Ambrogio, and pianist Navah Perlman (2002). Oxingale Records CD OX2002
- Hudson Oratorio, Juilliard Orchestra, Zuill Bailey (cello) (1997) Albany Records
