= Navah =

Navah is a given name. Notable people with the name include:

- Navah Perlman (born 1970s), American concert pianist and chamber musician
- Navah Wolfe, American editor
