= Dear Lara =

Canadian documentary film

- Directed by: Lara St. John
- Produced by: Patrick Hamm
- Edited by: Christie Herring
- Release date: February 6, 2026 (SBIFF)
- Running time: 95 minutes
- Countries: Canada; United States
- Language: English

Dear Lara is a 2026 documentary film written and directed by violinist Lara St. John on the subject of sexual abuse at classical music conservatories and symphony orchestras. It premiered as an entry at the Santa Barbara International Film Festival in February 2026.

== Synopsis ==
Narrated by St. John, the film describes her own experience of having been raped as a minor by her instructor at the Curtis Institute of Music and then introduces the stories of additional victims of abuse from other institutions in North America and Europe. Each of the accounts addresses the institutional complicity that has made it extremely difficult to implement lasting cultural change at any of the institutions in question. Interviewees include survivors and subject matter experts.

== Reception ==
The film was praised by multiple sources following its premiere. Originally scheduled for three screenings at the Santa Barbara International Film Festival, a fourth was added due to audience demand. Reviewer Jackie Spafford described it as "an infuriating, queasy, shocking, inspiring and powerful watch." Richardine Bartee called it "one of the most urgent and emotionally devastating documentaries of the year." Peter Wilson, on Violinist.com, called it "a beautiful film about horrifying events."

== Interviewees ==
- Lusiana Lukman, pianist
- Frank Powdermaker, fiancée of cellist Robie Brown
- Lisamarie Vanna, violinist
- Mascha van Sloten, violinist
- Heather Bird, double bassist
- Zeneba Bowers, violinist
- Katherine Needleman, oboist
- Samuel Schultz, opera singer
- Scott St. John, violinist
- Anne Midgette, journalist
- Sammy Sussman, journalist
- Okke Westdorp, conservatory administrator
- Marci Hamilton, founder of ChildUSA
