= Seymour Lipkin =

American pianist and conductor (1927–2015)

- Seymour Lipkin
- Born: May 14, 1927; Detroit, Michigan
- Died: November 16, 2015 (aged 88); Blue Hill, Maine
- Occupations: Classical pianist, conductor

Seymour Lipkin (May 14, 1927 – November 16, 2015) was an American concert pianist, conductor, and educator.

== Early life and piano career ==
Lipkin was born in Detroit. At age 11, he entered the Curtis Institute of Music where he studied with David Saperton, Rudolf Serkin and Mieczysław Horszowski At age 17 he served as accompanist to Jascha Heifetz on a USO tour of Europe during World War II. He received his degree in 1947.

In 1948, he won the Rachmaninoff Piano Contest, beating Gary Graffman.

As a soloist, he performed with the New York Philharmonic and the Boston Symphony Orchestra.

== Conducting and teaching ==
Lipkin studied conducting under Serge Koussevitzky and then apprenticed with George Szell at the Cleveland Orchestra. He served as the assistant conductor for the New York Philharmonic under Leonard Bernstein. Later he was music director for the Joffrey Ballet and then conductor of the Long Island Symphony Orchestra.

In 1958, Lipkin led the New York City Opera in a performance of Bernstein's Trouble in Tahiti, making his conducting debut.

He was a member of the faculty at Juilliard and also taught at Curtis, Manhattan School of Music, and the New England Conservatory. One of his pupils at Curtis was Ghenady Meirson.

In 1987 he became artistic director of Kneisel Hall in Blue Hill, Maine, until his death in 2015.

== Recordings ==
Lipkin recorded the complete piano sonatas of Beethoven and Schubert. He is the pianist on the Leonard Bernstein recording of Stravinsky's Concerto for Piano and Wind Instruments, and recorded the Weber violin sonatas with Arnold Steinhardt and the Grieg violin sonatas and music by Dohnányi and Weiner with Oscar Shumsky.
