= Joseph Primavera =

- Born: Joseph Peter Primavera Jr. April 13, 1926
- Origin: Philadelphia, Pennsylvania, United States
- Died: October 14, 2006 (aged 80)
- Genre: Classical
- Instruments: Viola, violin, trombone, conductor, pedagogue
- Years active: 1950-2005

Joseph Primavera (April 13, 1926 – October 14, 2006) was an American violist and conductor. He was the youngest violist ever appointed to lead the viola section of the Philadelphia Orchestra. Until he retired in 2005, Primavera had served as the longest-tenured active conductor in the world as maestro and music director of the Philadelphia Youth Orchestra.

== Biography ==
Joseph Primavera was born in 1926 to a prominent luthier and began studying the violin at age 6 with Philadelphia-based violinists Guido and Joseph Terranova, and later with Sacha Jacobinoff. Later, he studies trombone with Pietro Rosano. At the New School of Music, he studied violin with Frank Costanzo, viola with Max Aronoff, orchestration and conducting with W.F. Happich, and with the Curtis String Quartet. In 1944, he entered the United States Navy, where he served on the USS Philadelphia (CL-41) and the USS Missouri (BB-63) during World War II. In 1949, having completed his military service to his country, he was invited to join the Baltimore Symphony. In 1950, he was invited to join the preeminent Philadelphia Orchestra as the youngest first chair violist in the history of the orchestra. In 1960, he received The Philadelphia Orchestra's coveted C. Hartman Kuhn Award for "musical ability and enterprise of such character as to enhance the standards and reputation of the Orchestra." He retired from the Philadelphia Orchestra after 17 years to devote himself to conducting and teaching.

== Conducting career ==
Joseph Primavera gave his New York conducting debut in 1959, in which he led musicians from the New York Philharmonic and The Philadelphia Orchestra. His conducting credits included the London Philharmonic Orchestra, Rome Festival Opera, Beijing Opera/Ballet Orchestra, and Opera Barga in Lucca, Italy. He had served as music director of Telitalia Cable-TV Network (Italian National Radio), Delaware Valley Philharmonic, Sunshine Pops Orchestra (Orlando, Fla.), Cherry Hill (N.J.) Symphony, Old York Road Symphony (Pa.), and Frankford Symphony (Pa.). He had also directed several chamber music series at the University of Pennsylvania, University Museum, and Temple University, and served as music director for films and television specials, including a CBS series featuring The Philadelphia Orchestra.

From 1976 until his retirement in 2005, Primavera was conductor and professor of orchestration, chamber music, and musicianship at the University of the Arts. He was a member of the American Symphony Orchestra League and the Conductors Guild. Primavera was recipient of the 1986 Service to Youth in the Performing Arts Award of the Philadelphia Civic Ballet Company, the 1999 Distinguished Service Award of the Pennsylvania-Delaware String Teachers with School Orchestra Association, and the 2001 Arts Recognition Award of the Society for the Performing Arts of the Media Theatre.
