= Joey Corpus =

Filipino-American violinist (1957 - 2017)

- Born: Jorge Corpus; March 19, 1957; Manila, Philippines
- Died: December 9, 2017 (aged 60) New York City
- Genre: Classical
- Occupation: Teacher
- Instrument: Violin

Joey Corpus (born Jorge Corpus; 19 March 1957 – 9 December 2017) was a Filipino-American violinist and violin teacher.

Born in Manila, Corpus was the oldest sibling in a family of six children. His father Hector Corpus was an amateur jazz musician, and both of his grandfathers were violinists. At age 11, a car accident took the life of his mother, Anita Corpus (née Aguilar), and left Corpus a paraplegic. His uncle was the artist Federico Aguilar Alcuaz, and Corpus had planned to start a career as a visual artist.

At age 14, Corpus began to teach himself the violin. He also took instruction from such teachers as Luis Valencia and Nelly Soregi, and additional advice from his amateur violinist uncle on his father's side. He won a violin competition at age 15, which brought him to the attention of Edgar Schenkman of the Juilliard School. Schenkman offered Corpus a scholarship, but Corpus was physically unable to make the journey to the US at the time.

In 1982, Corpus moved to the United States with his brother. Corpus began studies in Philadelphia with Jascha Brodsky, with a scholarship from the Philippine government. Following the 1986 People's Revolution, the scholarship was terminated. Corpus chose to remain in the US and became a violin teacher, with his analytical skills honed from his earlier years of self-study. His students included Lara St. John, Louise Owen, Wen Qian, Chuan Yun Lee, and Katharine Gowers. His reputation as a teacher among violin students and professional violinists earned him the nicknames 'The Underground Guru' and 'The Secret Weapon'.

Corpus died in New York City on 9 December 2017. Three of his brothers, Gerardo, Hector, and Rolando, and his sister Rosario Maria survive him. His younger brother Roberto predeceased him.
