= Leslie Spotz =

American pianist and music educator

- Education: Curtis Institute of Music; Rutgers University (PhD)
- Occupations: Pianist; music educator
- Years active: 1990s–present
- Employer: Tarleton State University
- Style: Classical; chamber

Leslie Spotz is an American pianist and music educator. She is professor of piano at Tarleton State University.

== Early life ==
Spotz attended high school at the North Carolina School of the Arts in Winston-Salem, now known as the University of North Carolina School of the Arts, where, at age 15, as winner of the concerto competition, she played Rachmaninoff's Piano Concerto No. 2 with Nicholas Harsanyi conducting.

She studied, as a full-scholarship recipient, at the Curtis Institute of Music with Mieczysław Horszowski, who was associated with Pablo Casals. In 2002, she completed her doctorate at Rutgers University.

== Career ==
Spotz's international solo career has included performances in Moscow at the Tchaikovsky Hall of Moscow University, the Southbank Centre of London, Kennedy Center in Washington, D.C., the Academy of Music in Philadelphia, tours of Germany, recitals in Italy for the Lorenzo de' Medici Institute and a performance at the inaugural opening of Philadelphia's Kimmel Center. She heads the piano faculty at Tarleton State University in Stephenville, Texas, as a tenured associate professor.

== Performances ==
Spotz has performed throughout the United States. Her appearances as a soloist include with the Fort Worth Symphony Orchestra, Mozart Society of Philadelphia, South Jersey Symphony, Curtis Symphony, Kinhaven Symphony in Vermont, the Piedmont Chamber Orchestra in North Carolina, the Old York Road Symphony in Abington, Pennsylvania, and the Clear Lake Symphony in Texas. Concert highlights include performances of twenty Beethoven Sonatas at Rutgers University, the Beethoven Choral Fantasy, Op. 80, with the Fort Worth Symphony Orchestra, and her recitals for the Bach Festival of Philadelphia.

Other performances include at the Philadelphia Art Alliance, Swarthmore College, University of Pennsylvania, Manhattan School of Music, American University, Franklin & Marshall College, Pocono Music Festival, WGMS radio, WHYY radio, and WFMT radio. She has performed with cellist Kristin Isaacson in several recitals, including two performances in Texas in March 2011.

== Honors ==
Spotz was finalist in the National Federation of Music Clubs Competition, and received special recognition in the performance of chamber music from Performers of Connecticut, Inc.

Spotz is an "internationally recognized pianist" by the International Piano Performance Examinations Committee (IPPEC) of Taiwan.

== Recordings ==
An active proponent of music by women, her 1999 solo CD for Leonore Records features selections of music by women composers. Her discography includes her performance on Fantasias, a CD album by flautist Adeline Tomasone.
