= String Quartet (Barber) =

1943 musical work by Samuel Barber

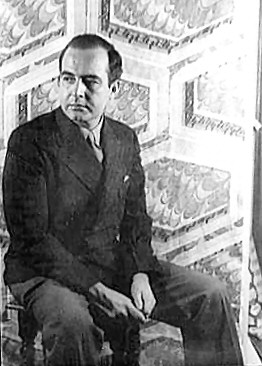
Samuel Barber in 1944

The String Quartet in B minor, Op. 11, was composed in 1935–36 by Samuel Barber. He arranged the middle movement for string orchestra as his well-known Adagio for Strings in 1936. Barber continued to revise the piece, particularly the finale, until 1943.

Begun while living in Austria with his partner Gian Carlo Menotti after Barber's Rome Prize, the composer intended that the quartet be premiered by the Curtis String Quartet, but did not finish the piece in time for their concert tour. On September 19, 1936, Barber wrote their cellist Orlando Cole: "I have just finished the slow movement of my quartet today—it is a knockout! Now for a Finale." Having completed a finale, the string quartet was premiered in its provisional form by the Pro Arte Quartet on December 14, 1936, at the Villa Aurelia in Rome. Afterwards, Barber withdrew the finale so as to rewrite it, which he did by April 1937. He rewrote it again before it was published. The final form was premiered by the Budapest Quartet on May 28, 1943, at the Library of Congress in Washington, D.C.

Barber accepted a commission for a second string quartet in 1947, but never got past a few pages of sketches.

== Music ==
The string quartet has three movements:

1. Molto allegro e appassionato
2. Molto adagio [attacca]
3. Molto allegro (come prima)

The opening movement is in sonata form, the second movement a famous adagio, and the final version of the finale, added to the second movement attacca, is shortened, lasting two minutes, and revisits themes from the opening movement, thereby creating a cyclic form for the quartet. The quartet as a whole is in the key of B minor, but the central movement is in B♭ minor.

The opening movement has three theme areas, the first a dramatic motif stated in unison by all four instruments, the second slinky chorale like music, and the third a yearning lyrical melody. The materials of the second movement consist of "a very slow and extended melody built from stepwise intervals, slightly varied in its numerous repetitions, uncoiling over (or in the midst of) sustained chords that change with note-by-note reluctance, all of it building into a powerful climax at the high end of the instruments' range and then quickly receding to the contemplative quietude that ultimately defines this musical expanse."

== Discography ==
- Alexander String Quartet – Thealexanderstringquartet (1992, Amplitude CLCD-2009, CD)
- Beaux-Arts String Quartet – Diamond: String Quartet No. 4; Barber: String Quartet in B Minor, Op. 11 (1965, Epic LC 3907, LP)
- Borodin Quartet – Kvartet (1961, Artia MK 1563, monaural LP; also issued as M[ezhdunarodnaya]K[nyga] KHN 558–63, and MK D 06173(a) – D 06174(a)) OCLC 20425923
- Chester String Quartet – The Chester String Quartet (1991, Koch International Classics 3-7069-2 H1, CD)
- Cleveland Quartet – Barber: String Quartet, op. 11; Ives: String Quartet No. 2 (1976, RCA Red Seal ARL1-1599, LP)
- Composers String Quartet – American Classics for String Quartet (1983, Musical Heritage Society MHS 4823, LP)
- Concord String Quartet – with George Rochberg, String Quartet No. 7 (with baritone, 1979), and Barber, Dover Beach (1983, Nonesuch 78017, LP)
- Dickermann Quartett Frankfurt – Barber: Streichquartett Op. 11 (1984, Thorofon Capella MTH 275, LP)
- Emerson String Quartet – American Originals (1993, Deutsche Grammophon)
- Endellion String Quartet – Dover Beach, Serenade, Songs, String Quartet (1993, Virgin Classics 7243 5 45033, CD)
- Endellion String Quartet – American Classics: Samuel Barber (2009, EMI Classics)
- Cypress String Quartet – The American Album (2011, Cypress Performing Arts Association)
- Lindsay String Quartet – Twenty-five Years Lindsay String Quartet "Live" (1992, ASV CD DCA 825, CD)
- Serafin String Quartet – Serafin String Quartet (2010, Centaur CRC 3050, CD)
- Stradivari Records String Quartet – Barber: String Quartet, Opus 11 (1948, Stradivari STR 602, LP)
- Tokyo String Quartet – A Way a Lone (1993, RCA Victor Red Seal 09026-61387-2, CD)
