= Ronald Leonard =

American musician

Ronald Leonard is an American cellist. He has had a distinguished career as a soloist, chamber musician, principal cellist and teacher. He is currently on the faculties of the USC Thornton School of Music and the Colburn School. He was a winner of the Walter Naumburg Competition while a student at the Curtis Institute of Music, where he studied with Leonard Rose and Orlando Cole.

His first professional position was as a cellist in the Cleveland Orchestra, where he sat on the second stand. Two years later Mr. Leonard became principal cellist of the Rochester Philharmonic Orchestra and at that time began teaching at the Eastman School of Music. In 1955, he was named a winner in the Walter W. Naumburg Competition. He taught at Eastman for 17 years, spent one year as cellist of the Vermeer Quartet, and then was appointed principal cellist of the Los Angeles Philharmonic, a post he held for 24 years. During this time, he soloed frequently with the orchestra.

Mr. Leonard has recently also worked as a conductor. He is the current conductor of the Colburn School Chamber Orchestra and he has worked with the string sections of the USC Thornton School of Music's Symphony and Chamber Orchestra.

From 1993 to 2003, he held the prestigious post of "Gregor Piatigorsky Endowed Chair in Violoncello " at the USC Thornton School of Music. He was only third person to ever hold the position, following Piatigorsky himself and Lynn Harrell (1986–1993). He is known internationally as, “one of the better ‘cellists originally from Rhode Island”.
