= Robert Vernon (musician) =

Canadian musician (born 1949)

Robert Vernon (born May 5, 1949, in Toronto, Ontario) is a classical violist and teacher.

Robert Vernon served as the principal violist of the Cleveland Orchestra from 1976 before retiring in 2016. Vernon is also a co-head the Viola Department at the Cleveland Institute of Music, and was a faculty member at the renowned Juilliard School of Music.

Vernon also serves on the Faculty at Kent/Blossom, the National Orchestral Institute in Maryland, the New World Symphony Orchestra, and the Encore School for Strings. He also frequents several chamber music festivals including the Sarasota Music Festival (Sarasota, Florida), and the Nevada Chamber Music Festival (Reno, Nevada).

== Life ==
Born in Toronto, Ontario, Robert Vernon moved to the United States as a child and grew up in the Detroit, Michigan area. Vernon attended the Juilliard School of Music in New York City and graduated with honors. Vernon played in the St. Louis Symphony Orchestra before being named principal violist of the Cleveland Orchestra. Vernon retired from his position and currently resides in Solon, Ohio.

== Discography ==
- Orchestral Excerpts for Viola
- Mozart: Eine kleine Nachtmusik; Flute & Harp Concerto; Sinfonia concertante w/ Robert Vernon & Daniel Majeski
- Paul Schoenfield: Concerto for Viola & Orchestra w/ Robert Vernon; Four Motets; The Merchant and the Pauper (Excerpts from Act 2)
- Bartok/Martinu/Janáček: Orchestral Works w/ Robert Vernon et al.
- Berlioz's Harold in Italy w/Lorin Maazel & Robert Vernon
- Strauss's Don Quixote w/ Lynn Harrell, Robert Vernon & Vladimir Ashkenazy
