= New School of Music, Philadelphia =

American music school in Philadelphia

Coordinates: 39.98313°N 75.15434°W

The New School of Music is a music school in Philadelphia, Pennsylvania, United States.

== History ==
Max Aronoff founded the New School of Music in Philadelphia in 1943 with the initial support of Catherine Drinker Bowen and Barbara Rex. Aronoff together with founding members of the Curtis String Quartet, Jascha Brodsky and Orlando Cole and with support from pianist Vladimir Sokoloff who were all on the faculty at the prestigious Curtis Institute decided on a curriculum that focused on training chamber artists and orchestral members, rather than soloists. Like Curtis, New School's enrollment was only open to orchestral instrumentalists and pianists. The faculty consisted of the four members of the Curtis String Quartet, select members of the Philadelphia Orchestra and two piano teachers (Gisa Adler and Jeanne Behrend).

Housed first at the Orpheus Club on Van Pelt Street, Philadelphia, the school moved later to a building at 18th and Pine with the financial backing of Henry Gerstley, Frank Adler, Alice Tully and Samuel Simeon Fels. In March 1968 the school moved again to a historic, brownstone mansion at 301 S. 21st Street in Philadelphia. The mansion was converted into a high-functioning conservatory, complete with practice rooms, offices, library and auditorium.

New School originated as an all string school. In 1969, they opened admission to winds, brass and percussion, offering scholarships and opportunities to study with Philadelphia Orchestra musicians.

The school received accreditation in 1970 and awarded their first Bachelor of Music degrees in 1974. Prior to 1974, students graduated with a performance diploma.

In the 1970s and early 1980s, the school was thriving and had a reputation of graduating top-tier musicians. Musicians came from all over the world to study with the Curtis String Quartet & Philadelphia Orchestra musicians at The New School of Music.

Founded in 1943, Th New School of Music in Philadelphia is the only credited, degree-granting college in the country devoted exclusively to the training of instrumentalists, including pianists, for careers as performing musicians in professional symphony orchestras and other ensembles. The student body comes from across the country and around the world, representing a wide range of backgrounds and interests.

Study at the New School is centered around group playing and around the critical listening which develops from training in chamber ensembles and full orchestra. The curriculum includes not only private instrumental instruction, ear training and music theory and history, but also chamber music coaching, intensive orchestra reading, weekly instrumental seminars, supervised chamber music reading, orchestra section rehearsals, individual audition preparation and many performance opportunities.

The school has chosen to remain small in order to provide its students with the specialized training that will prepare them for careers in music performance. Graduates of The New School of Music are presently performing in professional orchestras and chamber ensembles all over the world.

In 1985, Temple University alumna, Esther Boyer Griswold, designated the single largest gift in the university's history to date, for a music endowment. The gift served as the impetus for the renaming of the College to: The Esther Boyer College of Music at Temple University. This gift made it possible for Temple Univ to purchase the insolvent New School of Music. The faculty, programs, and library, all merged into the Boyer School of Music program. The New School of Music facility on 21st Street and Spruce was sold for $600,000. Those funds were used to renovate the concert hall at Temple.

In 1986, the board named Richard C. Brodhead acting president. A Philadelphia native and composer, he had been dean of the school from 1982. As Acting President, he played a principal role in formulating the merger of the New School with Temple University's Boyer College of Music and Dance. From 1986 to 1987, the Boyer College of Music's instrumental performance program was significantly enhanced by the merger of The New School of Music . Guided since its founding by members of the Curtis String Quartet, this merger has broadened the opportunities for private instrumental study and for training in the performance of chamber ensemble and orchestral literature.

== Conductors ==
- William Smith, Philadelphia Orchestra Assistant Conductor, Curtis Institute of Music
- Riccardo Muti, guest conductor at New School, Philadelphia Orchestra, Chicago Symphony
- Tamara Brooks, after leaving New School of Music, she conducted the orchestra at The New England Conservatory for 12 years.
- Carl Bamberger, conducted New School Orchestra during the 1960s and early 1970s. Originally from Vienna, Bamberger was a well known European conductor who worked with notable European artists, Bruno Walter and Karl Boehm. Bamberger emigrated to the United States in 1937. From 1938-1939, he was the director of the David Mannes School of Music Orchestra & Opera departments in New York City. In his career, Bamberger also worked with the New York City Opera, New York Philharmonic, and Opera Orchestras of Cologne, Hamburg & Stuttgart.

== Max Aronoff ==
Max Aronoff was violist of the Curtis String Quartet and teacher at the esteemed Curtis Institute of Music in Philadelphia. He was the first student admitted to Curtis when the school opened and was in its first graduating class in 1934. While a student, Max Aronoff studied with Carl Flesch and Louis Bailly, both legendary teachers in their time. Upon graduation, Aronoff joined the Curtis faculty, a position he held until his death, in 1981. In 1943, Max Aronoff founded the New School of Music. Under his direction, the New School of Music developed an exceptional reputation as a conservatory, specializing in training orchestral musicians.

During the fifty-two year performing career of the Curtis String Quartet, Aronoff and his colleagues toured the United States and Europe. They performed for such prestigious audiences as the White House and the Queen of the United Kingdom, as well as on many educational and cultural series in and around Philadelphia. They never stayed away from their teaching posts at Curtis and New School for long, and their dedication to training young musicians was respected throughout the musical world. For several generations, students of Max Aronoff have been among the most accomplished violists in professional orchestras, chamber ensembles, and teaching positions at conservatories and universities throughout the United States. The Max Aronoff Viola Institute ("MAVI") was founded to honor the memory of this musical genius and to continue his teaching legacy.

== Jascha Brodsky ==
"Jascha Brodsky was a violinist who performed as a member of the Curtis String Quartet for more than 50 years and was a world-renowned violin teacher.

Brodsky was born in Kharkov, Ukraine, in 1907 and was the son of a violinist, who gave him his first lessons. He studied at the Conservatory of Tbilisi in Georgia and performed in orchestras in the Soviet Union until 1926, when he left the country to study in Paris with Lucien Capet and Eugene Ysaye. In the late 1920s, he toured Europe and the Soviet Union as a soloist and performed the Prokofiev Violin Concerto No. 1 with the composer conducting.

On the advice of the violinist Mischa Elman, Brodsky applied to the newly founded Curtis Institute of Music in Philadelphia, and in 1930 he enrolled there as a student of Efrem Zimbalist. That year he became first violinist of the ensemble that eventually became the Curtis String Quartet. He continued to perform with the ensemble until 1981, when it disbanded after the death of its founding violist, Max Aronoff. Brodsky joined the faculty of Curtis in 1932, and continued to teach the violin and chamber music there until his retirement in 1996. He also had a long teaching relationship with the Esther Boyer College of Music at Temple University, of which he was a founding faculty member in 1942, when it was known as the New School.

In 2019, violinist Lara St. John alleged that she was molested and raped by Jascha Brodsky in his office at the New School in the mid-1980s when she was 14 years old. Another student came forward anonymously at the same time alleging that Brodsky had made sexual advances toward her when she was 20 and studying with him at the New School.

=== Brass faculty ===
Donald E. McComas played trumpet in the Philadelphia Orchestra for over 30 years, 1964-1997. He received a Bachelor of Music Degree from the University of Michigan and a Masters of Music Degree from Catholic University in Washington, DC. Before winning the position with the Philadelphia Orchestra, McComas played with the US Army Band in Washington, DC,) and National Symphony.

Donald McComas' students can be heard in orchestras all around the world. Among some of the institutions Donald McComas taught are the New School of Music in Philadelphia, Temple University, & Philadelphia Bible College. McComas was one of the musicians featured in the 1968 Grammy Award Winning record, "'The Antiphonal Music of Gabrieli"' featuring The Philadelphia Brass Ensemble, The Cleveland Brass Ensemble and The Chicago Brass Ensemble. The players, the brass sections of the Philadelphia, Chicago, and Cleveland Orchestras, had never before worked together; They rehearsed and recorded the entire LP in nine hours over the course of one weekend.

Donald McComas retired from the Phil. Orchestra in 1997 and moved to Montana, with his wife, Sharlene. He died on March 16, 2011.

== See also ==
- Curtis Institute of Music
