= Marion Zarzeczna =

American pianist (1930–2020)

Marion Zarzeczna (November 11, 1930 – June 1, 2020) was an American concert pianist and educator.

She was born and grew up in a non-musical family in Trenton, New Jersey. She received her Bachelor of Music degree in 1954 from the Curtis Institute of Music, where she studied with Mieczysław Horszowski.

The winner of numerous prizes, she gave piano recitals and appeared as a soloist with orchestras in North America and Europe, including the Polish National Radio Symphony Orchestra and Seventh Army Orchestra in Germany.

She was a member of the New Marlboro Chamber Players, the trio-in-residence at Rider College, and a vocal coach at the Temple University Musical Festival in Ambler, Pennsylvania.

She joined the faculty of The Curtis Institute of Music in 1962. She was on the faculty of Westminster Choir College beginning in 1972 as well as a member of the Greater Trenton Symphony Orchestra

== Death ==
Marion Zarzeczna died on June 1, 2020, aged 89, in her native Trenton, New Jersey.
