= Ghenady Meirson =

Ghenady Meirson (1957 – May 8, 2021) was a Soviet-born American pianist and vocal coach who specialized in Russian vocal music literature. A native of Odessa, he was educated in Israel and at the Accademia Nazionale di Santa Cecilia in Rome before coming to the United Stages as a refugee in the 1970s. He pursued further studies in music at the Curtis Institute of Music in Philadelphia. After graduating he taught on the music faculties at Curtis and the Academy of Vocal Arts until his death. He was the author of the singer's handbook Do Sing in Russian (1982), and the founder of the website musiclessons.com.

== Early life and education ==
The son of Leonid Meirson and Elizaveta Gerbinsky Meirson, Ghanady Meirson was born in Odessa in 1957 in what is today Ukraine but was then part of the Soviet Union. He studied music in Odessa and Tel Aviv prior to training at the Accademia Nazionale di Santa Cecilia in Rome. He came to the United States as a refugee from the Soviet block, and ultimately became an American citizen.

In 1977 Meirson began studying at the Curtis Institute of Music (CIM) in Philadelphia. There he was a piano student of Seymour Lipkin and Mieczyslaw Horszowski, and was trained in the art of piano accompaniment by Vladimir Sokoloff. He earned two music degrees from Curtis; graduating in 1981 and 1984. He met his future wife, Laura Davis, on his first day as a Curtis student. Prior to their marriage he assisted in saving her life when she suffered a massive brain hemorrhage in 1981 and he got emergency medical help.

== Career ==
Meirson was the author of the singer's handbook Do Sing in Russian (1982). In 1984 he performed a recital with violinist Martin Chalifour on WHYY's program "Live Studio Recital". Through a grant from the Astral Artists Foundation he accompanied recitals of Russian art songs performed by Paula Brown and Kevin James McDowell, and a recital of French and American songs sung by baritone Donald Collup at the Academy of Music in 1985. In 1988 he founded GHENA & Associates, a marketing and production company for performing artists. He later established the website privatelessons.com in 1996.

In 1990 Meirson joined the faculty of the CIM where he taught for the remainder of his life. He concurrently taught on the faculty of the Academy of Vocal Arts (AVA). He had family who lived in Israel. In response to the 1991 Iraqi missile attacks against Israel he organized a benefit concert at CIM featuring Israeli pianist Avner Arad to raise funds for victims of scud missile attacks.

Meirson was a respected authority on Russian vocal music literature. As early as 1992 he was organizing concerts of Russian music at AVA; teaching song literature that he grew up with. In 1995 he performed a concert of art songs by Vladimir Ryabov with tenor James Brown at AVA with the Russian composer in attendance. Some of the Russian operas he was music director for at AVA included Eugene Onegin (1996, with Joyce DiDonato as Olga; revived 2006) Iolanta (2005), and Anton Rubinstein's The Demon (2016).

In 2003 Meirson gave a recital with AVA students of Russian romances at the Kimmel Center's Perelman Theater. This ultimately became an annual music event for performances at the AVA's Helen Corning Warden Theater which lasted until as late as 2017. In 2010 he performed a program in collaboration with several singers that explored a biographical study of Pyotr Ilyich Tchaikovsky in relation to his song literature in Philadelphia's Lyric Fest.

In the summers Meirson taught the Russian Opera Workshop (ROW) at AVA which attracted students from around the world for coaching in Russian opera literature. ROW was founded in 2011. In 2013 ROW gave the first performance in Philadelphia of Sergei Rachmaninoff's Francesca da Rimini. Several of the performers in this production were hired by professional companies to repeat the roles they had learned at ROW. He also worked as a consultant on projects with Opera Philadelphia, the Philadelphia Orchestra and the Philadelphia Singers among other organizations.

== Death ==
Ghenady Meirson died on May 8, 2021 at Penn Medicine in Philadelphia. The cause was gastroesophageal cancer. He had two children, Rachel and Leonard.
