= Jasper Wood (violinist) =

Canadian concert violinist

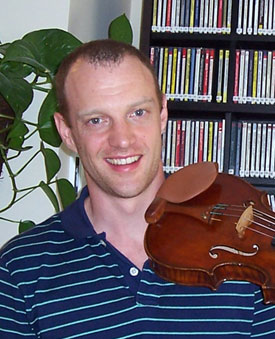
- Born: April 29, 1974 (age 52); Moncton, New Brunswick, Canada
- Occupations: Violinist, University of British Columbia, Professor
- Spouse: Grace Wood
- Website: jasperwood.net

Jasper Wood (born April 29, 1974) is a Canadian concert violinist.

Jasper Wood was born into a musical family of six brothers and sisters: his brothers are Craig and Derek, his sisters, Anya, Heather and Lisette. He gave his first public performance at the age of five. He holds a master of music degree from the Cleveland Institute of Music where he studied with David and Linda Cerone. An acclaimed competition winner, Jasper Wood has won numerous prizes and awards in the United States, Canada, and Europe. In 1996 Jasper Wood embarked on his international solo career. Since then he has played with numerous orchestras including Montreal, Toronto, Buffalo, and the Winnipeg symphonies.

Wood has been awarded both the Sylva Gelber Award and the Virginia-Parker Prize, two of the most distinguished prizes awarded by the Canada Council for the Arts. He has recorded numerous CDs for Endeavour Classics, Analekta, Disques Pelleas, and Naxos labels. His most recent CD was released in May 2006 with pianist David Riley (Endeavour Classics). This recording contains the violin/piano works of Béla Bartók, and Contrasts for violin, piano and clarinet with the principal clarinetist of the Philadelphia Orchestra, Ricardo Morales.

His debut recording of the complete Eckhardt-Gramatté solo violin caprices was released on the Analekta label in 1999. In 2004 Jasper Wood was appointed an Assistant Professor of Violin and Chamber Music at the University of British Columbia. He was promoted to Associate Professor in 2009 and Professor in 2014.

Wood has appeared in music videos on Bravo! television and on National Public Radio in the United States, and CBC/SRC Radio in Canada. In February 2007 he was featured on a one-hour documentary 'The Maritime Violin' for Mozus Productions and CBC TV.

== Discography ==
- 1999 Eckhardt-Gramatte '13 Canadian Caprices' (Analekta)
- 2001 Saint-Saëns 'Music for Violin and Piano' (Disques Pelleas)
- 2003 Stravinsky 'Works for Violin and Piano' (Endeavour Classics)
- 2004 MacDonald 'Music of Andrew MacDonald' (Centrediscs)
- 2005 Ives 'Works for Violin & Piano' (Endeavour Classics)
- 2006 Bartók 'Contrasts' (Endeavour Classics)
- 2007 Berio 'Sequenzas' (Naxos Records)
- 2012 Triple Forte 'Piano Trios of Ravel, Ives and Shostakovich' (ATMA)
- 2012 Chartreuse 'Sonatas of Mozart, Debussy and Strauss' (Max Frank Music)
- 2013 Stradivarius Christmas 'Musical Settings of popular Christmas Songs' (Max Frank Music)
- 2015 Mathew Fuerst 'Complete Violin/Piano works of Mathew Fuerst' (Albany Records)
- 2015 Piano Trios of Dvorak 'Dvorak Piano Trios No. 3 & No. 4' (ATMA)
