= Mieczysław Horszowski =

Polish and American pianist (1892–1993)

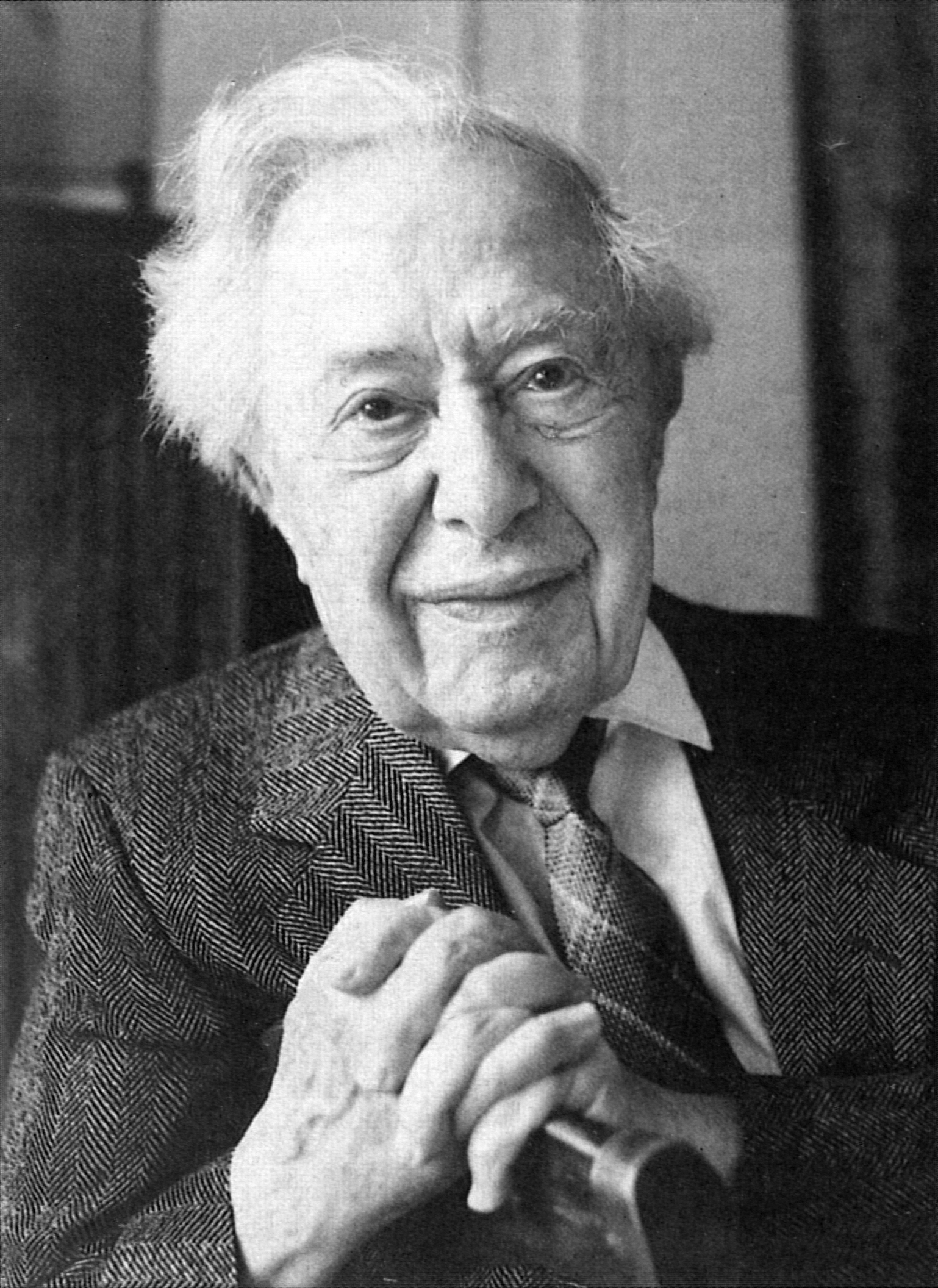
Mieczysław Horszowski in 1990

Mieczysław Horszowski (June 23, 1892 – May 22, 1993) was a Polish and American pianist who had one of the longest careers in the history of the performing arts.

== Life ==
=== Early life ===
Horszowski was born in Lwów (Lemberg), Kingdom of Galicia and Lodomeria, Austria-Hungary (now Ukraine). He was first taught piano by his mother, a pupil of Karol Mikuli, who had himself been a pupil of Frédéric Chopin. He became a pupil of Theodor Leschetizky in Vienna at the age of seven; Leschetizky had studied with Beethoven's pupil and Liszt’s teacher Carl Czerny. Leschetizky's sister-in-law, Angele Potocka, referred to Horszowski as "a wunderkind of high order".

In 1901, he gave a performance of Beethoven's Piano Concerto No. 1 in Warsaw and soon after toured Europe and the Americas as a child prodigy. In 1905, the young Horszowski played for Gabriel Fauré and met Camille Saint-Saëns in Nice. In 1911, Horszowski put his performing career on hold in order to devote himself to literature, philosophy and art history in Paris.

While Horszowski's family was of Jewish origin (which made him a fugitive from Europe in the 1930s), he was himself an early convert to Roman Catholicism, and was very devout. As the French critic André Tubeuf has written, "Horszowski was both very Jewish and very Catholic, in both cases as only a Pole could have been."

=== Career ===
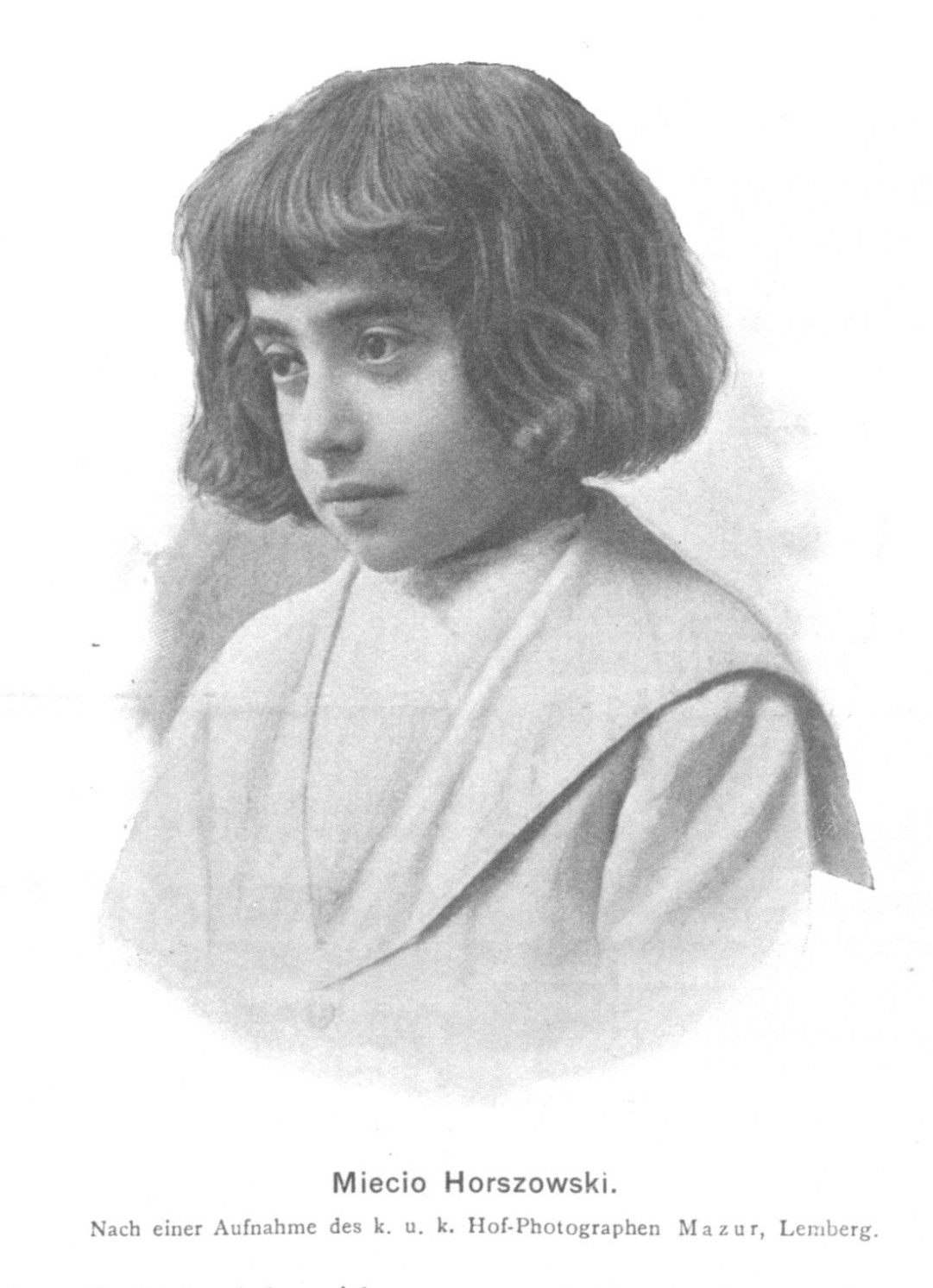
Mieczysław "Miecio" Horszowski in 1902

Horszowski, who was barely five feet tall, had rather small hands, reaching just over one octave; however, Allan Kozinn of The New York Times noted that "he turned this limitation into an asset by focusing on music that was written on a more compact scale and made intellectual rather than physical demands". Horszowski's performances were known for their natural, unforced quality, balancing intellect and emotion. He was frequently praised for his tonal quality, as was common for pupils of Leschetizky.

Having returned to the concert stage with the encouragement of Pablo Casals, he settled in Milan after the First World War, remaining there until he emigrated to the United States during World War II. Following the war, Horszowski frequently gave recitals with artists such as Casals, Alexander Schneider, Joseph Szigeti and the Budapest Quartet. He often appeared at the Prades Festival and the Marlboro Festival.

From 1940, Horszowski lived in the United States, first in New York City and later in Philadelphia. He became an American citizen in 1948. Horszowski performed with the NBC Symphony Orchestra under Toscanini, with whom he was friends, in 1943 and 1953. During the 1954–1955 season, he gave a memorable cycle of Beethoven's entire solo piano works in New York. In 1960 he did the same for Mozart's piano sonatas. His very diverse and extensive repertoire also embraced such composers as Honegger, d'Indy, Martinů, Stravinsky, Szymanowski and Villa-Lobos. In 1979, the pianist recorded several works of Lodovico Giustini on a restored Cristofori pianoforte. These works had been commissioned by Cristofori and are the first known compositions written specifically for the pianoforte.

Horszowski twice performed at the White House: with Casals and Schneider in 1961 for President Kennedy and a solo performance in 1979 for President Carter.

Horszowski was widely recorded and can be heard on the His Master's Voice, Columbia, RCA, Vanguard, Nonesuch, and other labels. His final recordings for Nonesuch were made when he was in his mid to late nineties. He also taught at the Curtis Institute of Music in Philadelphia, where his pupils included Ghenady Meirson, Robert Dennison, Eugene Istomin, Seymour Lipkin, Julius Eastman, Richard Goode, Dina Koston, Anton Kuerti, Murray Perahia, Peter Serkin, Steven De Groote, Kathryn Selby, Cecile Licad, Leslie Spotz, and Marion Zarzeczna.

=== Later life and death ===
In 1981, the 89-year-old Horszowski married Bice Costa, an Italian pianist, who was forty years younger than him. Bice later edited Horszowski's memoirs and a volume of his mother's correspondence about Horszowski's early years. She also discovered and recorded some songs composed by Horszowski on French texts around 1913–1914.

Horszowski's final performance took place in Philadelphia in October 1991. He died there at age 100. He gave his final lesson a week before his death. Among his pupils present were Richard Goode, Murray Perahia, Cecile Licad, Anton Kuerti. Despite having served on the juries of major international competitions - among them the Warsaw Chopin Competition, awarding Maurizio Pollini alongside Arthur Rubinstein and Jan Ekier in 1960 - he declared himself opposed to musical competitions, believing that they ultimately had musicians all playing the same way as a result.
