= Soovin Kim =

American violinist

Soovin Kim (born 1976) is an American violinist.

== Early life ==
Kim was born in Iowa City, Iowa on April 10, 1976 to South Korean parents who had met and married in Korea, then moved to the U.S. together. When Kim was 2, his family moved to Bolingbrook, Illinois. Two years later his brother Marvin was born. Though no member of Kim's family was involved in music (his mother is a registered dietician, while his father is a communications professor), as a young boy he enjoyed listening to classical violin recordings at home with his mother. Soon, Kim asked for violin lessons, as had his friend Jennifer Koh and a number of his other friends around the same time. His parents enrolled him in a local Suzuki class, where he thrived under the tutelage of Suzuki instructor William Fuhrburg.

In 1985, his family moved to Plattsburgh, New York. He attended public schools while studying the violin privately, traveling to Montreal weekly to work with the concertmaster of the Montreal Symphony, Richard Roberts. At ages 13 and 14 Kim himself served as concertmaster of the World Youth Orchestra at Michigan's National Music Camp at Interlochen. Both summers Itzhak Perlman was soloist with the Orchestra. For five years he played across the lake from Plattsburgh in Burlington, with the Vermont Youth Orchestra. At the time it was conducted by Maestro David Dworkin.

At 15, Kim attended the Cleveland Institute of Music, where he studied with Donald Weilerstein and David Cerone. Kim spent his summers at Cerone's Encore School for Strings in Hudson, Ohio, a pre-eminent American summer school for serious string players.

== Career ==
In 1995, Kim transferred from the Cleveland Institute to the Curtis Institute of Music that year. There he studied with Jaime Laredo and Victor Danchenko. In 1996, Kim won the Paganini Competition in Genoa. The following year, he won the Henryk Szeryng Career Award.

Kim spent his first summer at the Marlboro Festival just after he won the Paganini prize in 1996. Founded in 1951 by Rudolf Serkin and Adolf Busch, Marlboro is intended to be a true retreat for the artists who are invited to participate. Kim frequently returns to the Marlboro Festival.

Kim moved to New York City in 2005, and was married the same year. He frequently appears in Korea, both as soloist and as a member of the piano quartet MIK, which performs both standard repertoire and newly commissioned works. He also tours with fellow winners of the Borletti-Buitoni Trust Award, which he won in 2005. When not touring, Kim teaches at SUNY Stony Brook.

== See also ==
- List of Stradivarius instruments
