= Marcy Rosen =

American cellist

Marcy Rosen is an American cellist who is a member of the Mendelssohn Quartet, Los Angeles Times music critic Herbert Glass has called her "one of the intimate art's abiding treasures.".

== Early life and education ==
Rosen was born in Phoenix, Arizona. Her music teachers included Gordon Epperson, Orlando Cole, Marcus Adeney, Felix Galimir, Karen Tuttle and Sandor Vegh. Rosen is a graduate of the Curtis Institute of Music.

== Career ==
Rosen made her concerto debut with the Philadelphia Orchestra at age eighteen. She was a member of the Cantelina Chamber Players in 1982. She was a member of the Mendelssohn Quartet in 1986 when they made their recording debut with String Quartet No. 11 (Dvořák), Op. 61.

Rosen has since appeared with the Dallas Symphony, the Phoenix Symphony, the Caramoor Summer Music Festival Orchestra, the Orpheus Chamber Orchestra in Carnegie Hall, the Jupiter Symphony and Concord Chamber Orchestra at Alice Tully Hall, and the Tokyo Symphony at Bunkamura in Tokyo.

Rosen has served on the faculties of the North Carolina School of the Arts, the Eastman School of Music, the New England Conservatory of Music and the University of Delaware. She has acted as the artistic co-director of the Chesapeake Chamber Music Festival.

As of 2014, Rosen was assistant professor of Cello at the Aaron Copland School of Music at Queens College and on the Faculty at the Mannes College of Music in New York City, as well as continuing to perform and record professionally.
