= Old York Road Symphony =

US musical group

- Origin: Abington, Pennsylvania, USA
- Genre: Classical
- Occupation: Symphony orchestra
- Years active: 1932–present
- Members: Music Director; Thomas Rigney; Assistant Conductor; Kara Silverman

The Old York Road Symphony is an American orchestra based in Abington, Pennsylvania. It is one of the oldest all-volunteer orchestras in the country. The orchestra was founded in 1932 by Stanley Chute of the theater orchestra of the Old York Road Players, Suzanne C. Meder of the Jenkintown School of Cultural Arts, and Louis Angeloty, who had been concertmaster of the Philadelphia Orchestra. In the spring of 1933, 20 members of the orchestra gave their first concert in the Keswick Theatre in Glenside. In September 1934 the symphony received its charter as a non-profit organization and has been in continuous operation ever since. The mission of the orchestra is "to provide an outlet for the interests and talents of serious musicians of all ages while enriching the cultural life of suburban Philadelphia."

== Staff and Productions ==
Thomas Rigney leads the orchestra as the tenth music director, a position he assumed in 2026. The orchestra consists of about 60-65 volunteer musicians, whose weekly rehearsals produce four or five concerts each year, ranging from symphonic concerts and orchestral soloists to pops and family concerts. Abington Middle School is the orchestra's primary performance venue, although concerts have also been given at Penn State Abington and other locations.

A lifelong resident of Abington Township, Maestro Thomas Rigney has been an active presence in the local music scene for years. He has already made a profound impact at OYRS through his work as the assistant conductor, leading performances ranging from Handel's Messiah to pops and subscription concerts. Thomas brings an academic and performance background to the role, with degrees from Penn State and the University of Houston. He is experienced as a teacher and conductor, including roles at Bishop McDevitt High School and guest appearances with the Warminster and BuxMont symphonies.

Co-founder and first conductor Louis Angeloty held the position until 1956 when he was succeeded by Wolfgang Richter. Richter served until 1968 followed by Joseph Primavera, a violist with the Philadelphia Orchestra for many years. In 1978, not yet 21 years of age, Mark Laycock, winner of the Leopold Stokowski Memorial Competition, became the orchestra's conductor. In 1984 Minnesota-born Arne Running, a graduate of the New England Conservatory of Music took over the reins. From 1997 through 2003 Dr. Douglas Meyer served as music director/Conductor. In 2004 Gabriel Gordon was selected as music director and conductor and led the orchestra through the 2008 season when his relocation to New Mexico caused him to step down. At the beginning of the 2008 season, Yoon Jae Lee -a native to New York and an avid composer, arranger, and conductor- became the music director and led the orchestra through the 2015–2016 season when he stepped down. From 2016 through 2026, Jack Moore, a familiar voice on Philadelphia's airwaves, led the orchestra. Today, the orchestra continues to thrive under the baton of Thomas Rigney.

== Community outreach and Young Artists Competition ==
The orchestra also has an active youth outreach program and is engaged with local public schools in encouraging music studies. These student-focused programs have two primary objectives. First, to encourage young instrumentalists to continue to study and practice their craft, and to acknowledge and reward them for doing so. And second, to develop future audiences, by exposing students who are not musicians to the joy of music and enrich their lives for many years.

One of the most important community outreach initiatives of the Old York Road Symphony is its annual “Young Artists Competition”, the winners of which then perform with the symphony in the following season's Young Artists Concert. For more than 13 years, the symphony has sponsored this pair of events to showcase the talent of local youthful music students. Consistent with the symphony's Mission Statement, this competition and its associated concert provide an opportunity for students to perform and a forum to help introduce other teens and young adults to classical music and musical instruments.

This competition for young musicians in the Delaware Valley is held every spring. Outstanding candidates are identified through an extensive network of relationships and contacts that orchestra members have established over many years with music teachers in both public and private schools, as well as studio music teachers. The teachers not only recommend students for the competition but also encourage them to participate. A panel of three musician judges selects the winner, or winners, who receive a modest cash prize and the opportunity to perform as featured soloists in the following season's Young Artists Concert.

The orchestra also provides teaching materials to the music teachers in the schools attended by the winners. The use of these materials in the classroom helps to expose a wide cross-section of students to the music that will be performed by their classmates and, ultimately, to generate more interest in classical music among the younger generation.
