= Sarasota Music Festival =

Coordinates: 27.343096°N 82.548420°W

Sarasota Music Festival is an American classical music festival held annually during the month of June in Sarasota, Florida, under the sponsorship of the Sarasota Orchestra. The festival was founded in 1965 by conductor Paul Wolfe, who remained director of the festival through the summer of 2006. After Wolfe's retirement, conductor and composer Robert D. Levin became the festival's director. In 1984 it was designated by the Florida State Legislature as the "Official Teaching and Performing Festival of the State of Florida." In 2016 Jeffrey Kahane was appointed the festival's Music Director.

Like the Aspen Music Festival and School and the Tanglewood Music Festival, the Sarasota Music Festival not only presents concerts by established artists but also consists of a summer music academy in which emerging professional musicians participate in performances, master classes and workshops designed to provide an intense training and networking experience. In 1984 the festival was designated by the Florida state legislature as the "Official Teaching and Performing Festival of the State of Florida". Every year the festival receives hundreds of applications from students in America's best music schools, such as the Colburn School of Music in Los Angeles, the Curtis Institute of Music in Philadelphia, the New England Conservatory, the Oberlin Conservatory in Ohio, the Juilliard School in New York City, the Shepherd School of Music of Rice University, and the Eastman School of Music in Rochester, New York. However, less than 60 students are chosen to participate in the program each year. Since the festival's debut 45 years ago, dozens of former festival students have gone on to join such prestigious American orchestras as the New York Philharmonic, the Cleveland Orchestra, the Chicago Symphony, the Philadelphia Orchestra, the Boston Symphony Orchestra, and the Los Angeles Philharmonic. Likewise, former festival students are now on the faculty at most of the major conservatories and music schools throughout the United States.

Each year the festival hires roughly 40 guest artists to not only provide training to the students at the festival but also to perform in a series of public concerts at the Sarasota Opera House and the Beatrice Friedman Symphony Center throughout the month of June. Some of the faculty artists, such as violinist and conductor Joseph Silverstein, have been faculty members at the festival for decades. Former students at the festival who have since become faculty artists include violist Robert Vernon, violinist Ani Kavafian, oboist Allan Vogel, bassoonist Nancy Goeres, and cellist Timothy Eddy, among others. Students at the festival are also given the opportunity to perform for the public as part of the festival's orchestra and in chamber music concerts.
