= Navah Perlman =

- Genres: Classical
- Occupation: Pianist
- Instrument: Piano
- Years active: 1986 - present
- Labels: EMI Classics, Oxingale Records
- Member of: Perlman/Quint/Bailey Trio
- Website: Navah Perlman at IMG Artists

Navah Miriam Perlman is a concert pianist and chamber musician. Her parents are violinists Toby and Itzhak Perlman.

== Education and career ==
Perlman performed as a soloist with the Greater Miami Youth Symphony Orchestra in 1984, and the Los Angeles American Youth Symphony Orchestra in 1985. and made her professional debut at age 15 with the Charleston West Virginia Symphony Orchestra in 1986.

Perlman graduated from Brown University in 1992, having switched her major from music to art. She also studied at Juilliard.

In addition to her solo piano career, she frequently performs chamber music, including with violinist Philippe Quint and cellist Zuill Bailey as the Perlman/Quint/Bailey Trio. She is the Artistic Director of LPS Pro Musica in Lake Placid, New York.

== Personal life ==
At age 19, she began showing symptoms of rheumatoid arthritis. As of 2008, she and her husband Robert D. Frost have four children.

In 2020, with live music performances cancelled due to the COVID-19 pandemic, Perlman began a career in cake baking. She launched her business, with the name Frosted by Navah, in December of that year, specialising in artistic designs such as buttercream flowers. The business remains successful as of 2025, with demand consistently exceeding the rate at which Perlman produces the cakes.

== Discography ==
- Prokofiev solo piano works, performing Four Pieces from Romeo and Juliet opus 75 (2009). EMI Classics CD 6 95590 2
- Piano trios by Schubert and Shostakovich, with cellist Zuill Bailey and violinist Giora Schmidt (2008). Telarc CD
- The Rose Album, performing David Popper's Requiem for Three Cellos and Piano opus 66, with cellists Matt Haimovitz, Sara Sant'Ambrogio, and Zuill Bailey (2002). Oxingale Records CD OX2002
- Piano Works, Debut, performing piano solos by Bach, Beethoven, Mendelssohn, Chopin, and Prokofiev (2000). EMI Classics CD 5 74019 2
