= Scott St. John =

- Born: 4 December 1969 (age 56); London, Ontario, Canada
- Genres: Classical
- Occupation: Musician
- Instrument: Violin
- Years active: 1985–present
- Formerly of: St. Lawrence String Quartet
- Website: scottstjohn.com

Scott St. John (born 4 December 1969 in London, Ontario, Canada) is a Canadian violinist and violist. A recipient of an Avery Fisher Career Grant, he was a member of the St. Lawrence String Quartet and on the faculty of Stanford University, where he taught violin and chamber music.

== Biography ==
St. John was born into a musical family. While his father taught French and Spanish and coached basketball at a high school in nearby Arva, his mother is a music teacher and his younger sister Lara is a violinist.

St. John began violin studies with Richard Lawrence in his home town at age three. Later on, he attended the Curtis Institute of Music in Philadelphia where he studied with David Cerone, Arnold Steinhardt and Felix Galimir.

St. John has won several national and international competitions. In 1985, he was the winner of the CBC Radio National Competition for Young Performers, and both the Third Prize and Audience Prize at the Yehudi Menuhin International Competition. In 1987, he won the Alexander Schneider Violin-Viola Competition in New York and in 1990, the Young Concert Artists international auditions.

St. John joined the St. Lawrence String Quartet in September, 2006 and was a member until 2013. As a member of the quartet, he was on the faculty of Stanford University where he taught violin and chamber music. From 2018 until 2021, he was the Director of Chamber Music at the Colburn School in Los Angeles.
