= Natasha Paremski =

- Born: May 11, 1987 (age 38); Moscow, Russia
- Occupation: Classical pianist
- Website: natashaparemski.com

Natasha Paremski (born May 11, 1987) is a Russian-American classical pianist.

== Early life and education ==
Natasha Paremski was born in Moscow, Russia. She studied at the Andreyev School of Music (Детская музыкальная школа имени В.В.Андреева) in Moscow with Nina Valentinovna Malikova at the age of 4 before moving to the United States. She studied with Pavlina Dokovska at Mannes College of Music, from which she graduated in 2007. She has played with several professional orchestras, including the Los Angeles Philharmonic, the Minnesota Orchestra, the San Francisco Symphony orchestra, and the Royal Philharmonic Orchestra.
