= Charles Jaffe (conductor) =

American conductor and musical director (1917–2011)

- Born: Charles Jaffe; 1917; Philadelphia, Pennsylvania, U.S.
- Died: August 16, 2011 (aged 93–94); Warminster, Pennsylvania, U.S.
- Education: Curtis Institute of Music
- Occupations: Conductor, musical director, violinist
- Years active: 1933–88
- Spouse: Thelma Jaffe (m. 1938; died 1991)
- Children: 2

Charles Jaffe (1917 – August 16, 2011) was an American conductor and musical director, after starting out as a violinist with the Curtis String Quartet in Philadelphia. As musical director of West Side Story, he was nominated for a Tony Award in 1964.

== Early life and education ==
Jaffe was born and raised in Philadelphia, Pennsylvania. He began his career at the age of 5 when he played solo violin with the Philadelphia Women's Symphony. He was admitted to the Curtis Institute of Music at the age of 12, graduating in 1933. There, he played a famous Stradivarius violin, called the Marquis, which was built in 1685.

== Career ==
=== Quartet and orchestra work ===
In 1933, at the age of 17, Jaffe joined the Philadelphia Orchestra as a violinist, becoming the orchestra's youngest member. In 1935, he joined the Curtis String Quartet, which was formed in 1927 by students of the Curtis Institute of Music. Jaffe was the second new member to join the quartet. They toured throughout the United States and internationally, including a performance in the jubilee celebration for King George V in England in 1935.

In 1945, Jaffe moved to New York City, where he became a violinist in the NBC Symphony Orchestra under conductor Arturo Toscanini. He later started his own professional orchestra, the Symphony Society of Long Island, and worked as a violinist and assistant conductor for the New York City Center Ballet.

=== Theatre ===
In the mid-1950s, Jaffe began working on Broadway, as a conductor, assistant conductor and musical director for classic shows, including the original productions of West Side Story, Fiddler on the Roof and My Fair Lady. He served as musical director on Fiddler on the Roof for five years, working with six different Tevyes, including Zero Mostel. Jaffe was nominated for the 1964 Tony Award for Best Conductor and Musical Director on the revival of West Side Story. He was also the musical director on the 1964 stage production of the musical Gentlemen Prefer Blondes at the Oakdale Musical Theater in Wallingford, Connecticut, which starred Jayne Mansfield as Lorelei Lee. Around 1958, Jaffe became conductor of the American Ballet Theatre. He also arranged music for the Metropolitan Opera, and recorded with performers including Jan Peerce, Risa Stevens, Nat King Cole, Lena Horne and Ethel Merman.

== Personal life ==
Jaffe and his wife Thelma (née Fein) had two daughters. They lived in Flushing, Queens, from 1945 until his retirement in 1988, when they moved to Newtown Township, Pennsylvania. He died at the age of 94 on August 16, 2011, at his home in Warminster, Pennsylvania.

== Broadway credits ==
- My Fair Lady (musical director, 1956–62)
- West Side Story (conductor, 1957–59)
- West Side Story (musical director, 1964)
- Fiddler on the Roof (musical director, 1964–72)
