= Rohan de Silva =

Sri Lankan pianist

Rohan De Silva is a Sri Lankan pianist.

De Silva initially studied at Isipathana College, Colombo and later he migrated abroad to study at the Royal Academy of Music, London and The Juilliard School, New York, while working with violinist Dorothy DeLay. He was awarded a special prize as Best Accompanist at the 1990 Ninth International Tchaikovsky Competition in Moscow. The following year, De Silva joined the collaborative arts and chamber music faculty of the Juilliard School. In 1992, he was awarded honorary Associate of the Royal Academy of Music. His radio and television credits include The Tonight Show, CNN's “Showbiz Today”, NHK Television in Japan, NPR, WQXR and WNYC in New York, and Berlin Radio. He has recorded for Deutsche Grammophon, CBS/Sony Classical, Collins Classics in London, and RCA Victor.

De Silva has accompanied violinist Itzhak Perlman, Cho-Liang Lin, Midori, Joshua Bell, Vadim Repin, Gil Shaham, Nadja Salerno-Sonnenberg at venues including Carnegie Hall, Lincoln Center's Avery Fisher Hall, Alice Tully Hall, the Kennedy Center, the Library of Congress, the Philadelphia Academy of Music, the Ambassador Theater in Los Angeles, Chicago Lyric Opera's Ardis Krainik Theatre, and concert halls in Europe, Japan and Israel. His festival appearances in the United States and abroad include the Aspen, Interlochen, Manchester, and Ravinia festivals, and festivals in Japan and New Zealand. He performs frequently with Itzhak Perlman, including PBS's Live from Lincoln television program. He is currently a faculty member at the Perlman Music Program on Long Island, The Juilliard School and the Ishikawa Music Academy in Japan.

On 7 May 2007 he performed for Queen Elizabeth II and Prince Philip at a White House Dinner, upon the request of U.S. President George W. Bush and the First Lady Laura Bush. On 13 June 2012 he performed for Israeli president Shimon Peres, again with violinist Itzhak Perlman, at the invitation of President Barack Obama.
