= Curtis String Quartet =

American musical group

- Origin: Philadelphia, Pennsylvania, United States
- Genres: Classical
- Years active: 1927-1981
- Past members: Jascha Brodsky; Charles Jaffe; Benjamin Sharlip; Max Aronoff; Orlando Cole; Louis Berman; Enrique Serratos; Mehli Mehta; Geoffrey Michaels; Yumi Ninomiya

The Curtis String Quartet was an American string quartet based in Philadelphia, Pennsylvania.

== History ==
The quartet as an entity was formed in 1932 with initial members Jascha Brodsky, Benjamin Sharlip (violins), Max Aronoff (viola), and Orlando Cole (cello). After Sharlip's departure in 1934 to join the Philadelphia Orchestra, the position was filled by Charles Jaffe; it was with him that they achieved many of their earliest milestones. The ensemble's origins are actually a bit earlier: they were initially called the Swastika Quartet upon their founding as students in 1927, with Gama Gilbert and Benjamin Sharlip as violinists, Sheppard Lehnhoff as violist, and Orlando Cole as cellist. In 1929, Max Aronoff replaced Lehnhoff as violist. This early incarnation of the group took its name from the home of the Curtis founder, Mary Louise Curtis Bok in Merion, Pennsylvania, which was called "Swastika". After Adolf Hitler assumed power in Germany and adopted this symbol, albeit rotated, the ensemble decided the name needed to be changed. They petitioned Mary Louise Curtis, founder and namesake of their alma mater, to use that name as they were all graduates of the Curtis Institute of Music, and became the first American-trained quartet to visit Europe, when the British Broadcasting Corporation invited them to London in 1935. This visit, made in June 1935 and sponsored by the Philadelphia branch of the English-Speaking Union, was in connection with the celebration of the Jubilee of George V and was in the company of several other young Philadelphia musicians: Rose Bampton, pianists Elizabeth Westmoreland and Martha Halbwachs Masséna, singers Agnes Davis and Benjamin de Loache, and violinist Philip Frank. Two concerts and a BBC broadcast presented music by American composers. The Curtis Quartet's contributions included Gian Carlo Menotti's Italian Dance and two works by Samuel Barber: the Serenade for String Quartet, Op. 1 (1928), and Dover Beach, Op. 3 (1931). Shortly before this tour, on 13 May 1935, the Curtis Quartet had made a recording at the RCA studios in Camden, New Jersey, of Barber's Dover Beach, with the composer singing. Although Rose Bampton had made an earlier recording in 1933, it was never released, so the Curtis Quartet's recording became the first commercial release in June 1936. The quartet was subsequently engaged for an extensive European tour during the 1936-37 concert season, during which they performed in all the major musical capitals to great acclaim. They reprised this success during the 1937-38 season and were set to repeat it a third time before the outbreak of war in Europe curtailed their touring. In the meantime, they toured widely through North America, giving over the course of their career approximately 5000 concerts, in their early days giving in many cases the first quartet performances in the towns they visited. In 1942 they left Curtis briefly, owing to disagreements over the direction of the institution, and founded the New School of Music, Philadelphia to train chamber and orchestral players; they became the resident string quartet there.

Violinist Charles Jaffe resigned from the quartet during the war years (joining the Philadelphia Orchestra and later the NBC Symphony under Toscanini before becoming an acclaimed Tony Award-winning Broadway music director) and was succeeded by Louis Berman, with whom the ensemble undertook its recording career in earnest. A disc of the Haydn 'Quinten' quartet and other works was made for RCA in 1942 but never released due to the war. Subsequently, with Berman, they made recordings of works by Brahms, Dohnanyi, Dvorak, Mendelssohn, Schumann, and Smetana as well as piano quintets of Dohnanyi and Franck with their longtime colleague and classmate, Vladimir "Billy" Sokoloff.

Louis Berman was succeeded as second violinist first by Enrique Serratos, in the mid-1950s.

Conductor Zubin Mehta's family moved to the United States when his father Mehli Mehta joined the quartet as second violinist in 1959.

In the late 1960s, the second violinist was Geoffrey Michaels. He was finally replaced by Yumi Ninomiya, now a member of the Philadelphia Orchestra.

After about 5000 performances, the quartet disbanded in 1981 upon the death of violist Max Aronoff.

== See also ==
- Guarneri Quartet
