= Jascha Brodsky =

Russian-American violinist and teacher (1907 - 1997)

- Born: June 6, 1907; Kharkiv, Russian Empire
- Died: March 3, 1997 (aged 89) Ocala, Florida
- Genres: Classical music
- Occupations: Soloist, teacher
- Instrument: Violin

Jascha Brodsky (June 6, 1907 – March 3, 1997) was a Russian-American violinist and teacher. He spent most of his career on the faculty of the Curtis Institute of Music in Philadelphia and co-founded the New School of Music, Philadelphia.

== Biography ==
Born in Kharkiv, in the Kharkov Governorate of the Russian Empire (in present-day Ukraine), he began his violin studies with his violinist father at age six. He later studied at the conservatory in Tbilisi, Georgia, and by 1926, was performing all over the Soviet Union. That same year, he went to Paris to study with Lucien Capet. There he also played for Sergei Prokofiev (Violin Concerto No. 1) and performed with pianist Vladimir Horowitz and violinists Nathan Milstein and Mischa Elman. Soon thereafter, he moved to Belgium to study with Eugène Ysaÿe.

In 1930 he moved to the US to study with Efrem Zimbalist at the Curtis Institute of Music. Alongside his classmates Orlando Cole, Max Aronoff, and Benjamin Sharlip, in 1932 Brodsky formed the ensemble later called the Curtis String Quartet and served as its first violinist until the group disbanded in 1981 upon the death of its violist, Max Aronoff.

Brodsky joined the faculty at the Curtis Institute in 1932 and remained there until just after World War II when, with the rest of the Curtis String Quartet, he resigned over disagreements with certain of the school's policies to help found the New School of Music. After rejoining the faculty in the early 1950s, he remained for nearly 50 years. He was appointed to the Efrem Zimbalist Chair of Violin Studies, which he held until his death in 1997. A respected pedagogue, his students are dispersed widely among the finest musical institutions in the world. Among them are Hilary Hahn, Joseph de Pasquale, Leila Josefowicz, Choong-Jin Chang, Juliette Kang, Judith Ingolfsson, Herbert Greenberg, Joey Corpus, Chin Kim, and Shira Katsman.

With Aronoff, Brodsky founded the New School of Music in Philadelphia when they decided that there was a need to train musicians specifically for a career in chamber music or orchestra. In 1986, The New School of Music was merged into Temple University's Boyer College of Music and Dance, where Brodsky was appointed Professor Emeritus. He taught there until his retirement in 1996.

Brodsky died in Ocala, Florida, in 1997.

== Sexual assault of 14 year old student ==
In a 2019 investigation by The Philadelphia Inquirer, Canadian violinist Lara St. John and four other unnamed women accused Brodsky of sexually assaulting them when they were his students. They alleged that after reporting Brodsky's behavior to the Curtis administration, they were mocked and their allegations ignored. Curtis had hired law firm Morgan Lewis in 2013 to investigate St. John's allegations, but the firm interviewed only two people and concluded no further investigation was needed.

In November 2019, Curtis hired the firm Cozen O'Connor to conduct another independent investigation into St. John's accusations, as well as other potential incidents of sexual assault and abuse, promising to make the full report available to the public. On September 22, 2020, Curtis released the report, in which the attorneys who prepared it—Gina Maisto Smith and Leslie Gomez, former child abuse and sex crimes prosecutors—concluded that Brodsky had in fact sexually abused and raped St. John during the 1985–86 school year, when she was 14 and 15 years old. Smith and Gomez further concluded that Curtis had fallen "short in its institutional response" at several points when St. John informed the school of what Brodsky had done. The school issued an apology, and committed to new policies and actions to prevent future sexual abuse and make reporting easier for survivors.
