= Oscar Shumsky =

American violinist and conductor

Oscar Shumsky (March 23, 1917 in Philadelphia – July 24, 2000 in Rye, New York) was an American violinist and conductor.

== Biography ==
Oscar Shumsky was born to Russian-Jewish parents. He started learning the violin at the age of three, and made his concert debut at the age of seven with the Philadelphia Orchestra under Leopold Stokowski, who declared him to be "the most astounding genius I have ever heard". Fritz Kreisler took a special interest in him, and he played Kreisler's own cadenzas to the Beethoven violin concerto to him after learning them by ear. He was a pupil of Leopold Auer from 1925 and studied at the Curtis Institute of Music from 1928 to 1936, continuing his studies with Efrem Zimbalist after Auer's death in 1930. His New York debut was in 1934 and his Vienna debut was in 1936. He played first violin in the Primrose Quartet from 1939, and the same year joined the NBC Symphony Orchestra under Arturo Toscanini. During the Second World War, he served in the U.S. Navy.

His violin was a Stradivari of 1715 known as 'Ex-Pierre Rode' or the 'Duke of Cambridge' (previously owned by Pierre Rode). It was used by Shumsky to record the complete 24 Caprices by Rode. He tells how he came to acquire the instrument:

It was a case of "love at first sound". During the period of readjustment after the "war to end all wars" we were trying to pick up our lives where we had left them, and I was in the throes of trying to better my instrument. I realized that if I were to pursue a concert career I needed something considerably more outstanding than the Camillo Camilli (an excellent violin in its class) on which I was performing. In the process I had been through many Guadagninis and some lesser Strads, but always came away disappointed. Then on one of my innumerable visits to the atelier of Emil Herrmann, I spotted a violin lying on the long felt-covered table. A quick glance told me that the violin was not only a Stradivarius but one of the finest examples I had seen. Thrilled and discouraged at the same time (I knew that such an instrument was out of my financial range) I nevertheless had a strong curiosity to examine and try it. Permission was granted, and after a few passages from different fragments of the repertory I just knew I had to have it! I won't flood readers with all the information about my huge bank loan, but I have never had a moment's cause for regret. The fact that it somehow came by way of my old teacher Leopold Auer is a fascinating bit of mysticism.

— Oscar Shumsky, The Strad, April 1985

He taught at the Curtis Institute, Philadelphia, Peabody Conservatory, Baltimore, Yale University, and, from 1953, the Juilliard School in New York. From 1959 to 1967, he co-directed the Stratford Festival (in Ontario) with Glenn Gould, with whom he played regularly at the festival and made some recordings for T.V. broadcast. Around this time, he appeared regularly as a soloist with American orchestras. His conducting debut was in 1959 with the Canadian National Festival Orchestra; he later conducted the Orchestral Workshop of Westchester, the Westchester Symphony Orchestra, and the Empire Sinfonietta in New York, and the New Jersey Colonial Symphony Orchestra. He joined the Bach Aria Group in the early 1960s. He was granted a Ford Foundation Award in 1965.

He returned to concerts and recordings in 1981, performing in the USA and in Britain for the first time in 30 years; a programme he gave for solo violin led to great acclaim:

It is not common practice here for audience members to leap on their feet in acknowledgement of outstanding playing and it is a mark of Oscar Shumsky's achievement at the Queen Elizabeth Hall that so many did spontaneously do just that.

— The Daily Telegraph

He recorded Eugène Ysaÿe's solo violin sonatas op.27 and Bach's sonatas and partitas for solo violin, the Beethoven violin concerto, Bach's single and double violin concertos, Mozart's 4th and 5th violin concertos, and other works, including the two Brahms Viola Sonatas on the viola. Many of these recordings have not been released on CD.

Many fellow violinists consider him to be one of the great violinists of the century; David Oistrakh called him "one of the world's greatest violinists" and the New Grove dictionary says of him: 'He was a player of virtuoso technique, pure style and refined taste; yet never sought recognition as a soloist, preferring to concentrate on teaching, chamber music playing and conducting.'

Shumsky married Louise Sophia Carboni on October 4, 1939. Together they had two sons; Noel (a business executive & teacher) and Eric (a violist & teacher).

A great deal has been written about Shumsky’s musical artistry; however, little is known about his “other interests”. Since his childhood in Philadelphia Shumsky was fascinated with photography. He was an avid amateur photographer who could often be found with a camera. His photographic skills and knowledge were recognized by the great American photographer- Ansel Adams. The two men became friends drawn together by their mutual interests and respect; Shumsky a professional musician and amateur photographer and Adams a professional photographer and amateur musician (pianist).

Shumsky had a curiosity with the world around him. He was drawn to biology and microbiology which led him to the field of photo microscopy. He would often find himself in a situation where he needed a special mounting to marry one optical device to another. He taught himself how to use a metal lathe and other machining tools to build whatever was needed to accomplish the task.
