= Lara St. John =

Canadian violinist (born 1971)

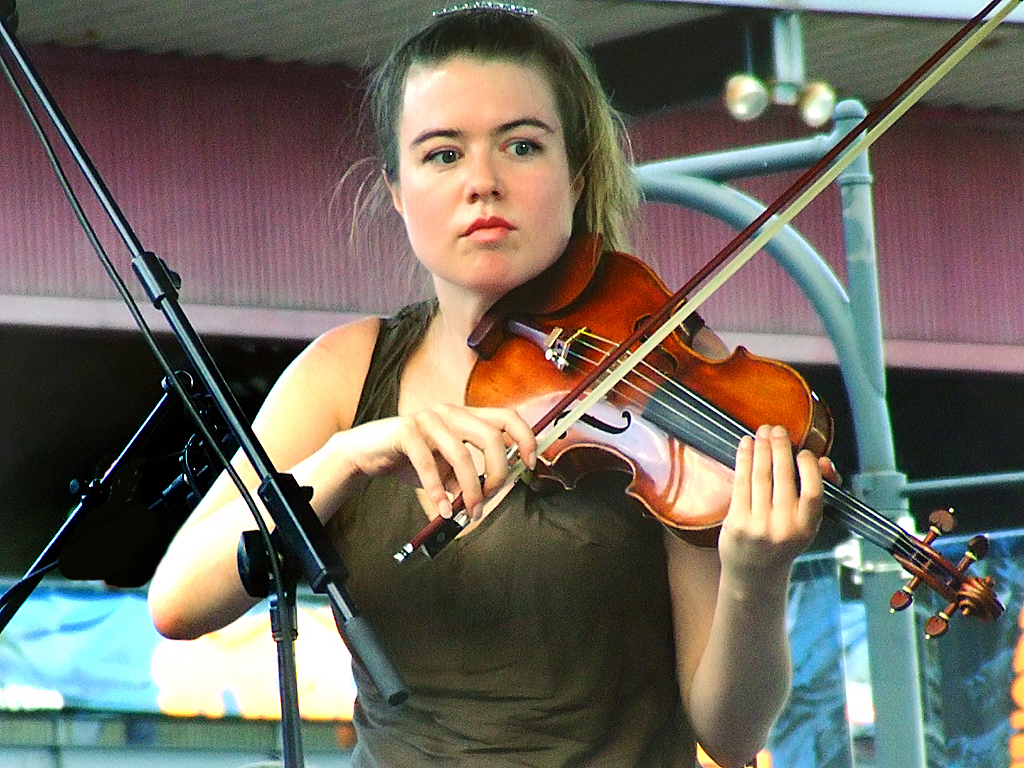
- Lara St. John in 2007

Background information
- Born: April 15, 1971 (age 55); London, Ontario, Canada
- Genres: Classical
- Years active: 1996–present
- Label: Ancalagon Records
- Website: larastjohn.com

Lara St. John CM (born April 15, 1971) is a Canadian violinist.

== Early life ==
Lara St. John was born in London, Ontario, and spent her early childhood there. As the daughter of two educators (her father was a language teacher and her mother a music instructor), she and her older brother Scott were encouraged at an early age to develop musical talents.

St. John began playing the violin at age two, and the next year she took her first lessons, with the instructor Richard Lawrence. She gave her first public performance as soloist with an orchestra by age four. In 1976, at five, she began making frequent trips with her mother and brother to Cleveland, Ohio, where she studied with Linda Cerone. In 1979, she spent a year in Paris studying with Gérard Jarry. In 1980, at age 9, she won grand prize at the Canadian Music Competition. At age 10, St. John made her European debut with the Gulbenkian Orchestra in Lisbon, after which she spent three years touring the continent, including Spain, France, and Hungary.

Accepted at 13, St. John entered the Curtis Institute of Music in Philadelphia, where she later received her degree. She studied under Felix Galimir and Arnold Steinhardt. St. John has said that, during her studies at Curtis, she was sexually assaulted by one of her instructors, Jascha Brodsky, when she was 14. An investigation by the law firm Cozen O'Connor, commissioned by the Curtis Board in November 2019, found St. John's claims to be credible. The Board unanimously accepted the law firm's report.

In 1985, St. John participated in the Yehudi Menuhin International Competition for Young Violinists, winning 4th price in the Junior division.

In 1988, at 16, she moved on her own to the former Soviet Union, becoming the youngest post-graduate student at the Moscow Conservatory. The same year, St. John traveled throughout the Soviet Union and Eastern Europe, where she encountered the Romani people, an experience that later influenced her musical performance projects.

St. John eventually returned to her studies and attended three different academies: the Guildhall School in London (under David Takeno), Mannes College of Music in New York (under Galimir), and the New England Conservatory (NEC) in Boston (under James Buswell).

== Career ==
=== Notable performances ===
In North America, St. John has performed as a soloist with major symphony orchestras, including those of Cleveland, Philadelphia, Minnesota, Seattle, San Francisco, Toronto, Montreal, Vancouver, the Boston Pops, the Knights, the National Arts Centre Orchestra (Ottawa) and the National Symphony Orchestra (Mexico).

In South America, she has performed with the National Symphony Orchestra (Peru), the Buenos Aires Philharmonic, the Orquestra Sinfônica do Estado de São Paulo and the Orquestra Sinfônica Brasileira.

In Europe, her performances have been with the Royal Philharmonic Orchestra, Bournemouth Symphony Orchestra, Ensemble Orchestral de Paris, Marseilles Opera Orchestra, Orchestre philharmonique de Strasbourg, Amsterdam Symphony Orchestra, NDR Radiophilharmonie (Hanover), Mendelssohn Kammerorchester (Leipzig), RAI National Symphony Orchestra (Turin), Orchestra della Fondazione Teatro Lirico Giuseppe Verdi (Trieste), Zurich Chamber Orchestra, Norrköping Symphony Orchestra (Sweden), Oulu Symphony Orchestra (Finland), Kymenlaakson Orkesteri (Finland), Franz Liszt Chamber Orchestra (Budapest), Hungarian National Philharmonic, Belgrade Philharmonic Orchestra and Akbank Chamber Orchestra (Istanbul).

In Asia, she has made solo appearances with the China Philharmonic Orchestra (Beijing), Shanghai Symphony Orchestra, Hong Kong Philharmonic, Guangzhou Symphony Orchestra, Hangzhou Philharmonic Orchestra, Kazakh State Symphony Orchestra and Tokyo Symphony Orchestra, among others. St. John has also performed with the Queensland Orchestra, Adelaide Symphony Orchestra and Australian Chamber Orchestra in Australia, as well as the Auckland Philharmonia and Southern Symphonia in New Zealand.

In 2007, 2009, 2012, 2017, 2020, and 2022, she was a soloist with the Naumburg Orchestral Concerts, in the Naumburg Bandshell, Central Park, in the summer series. In 2012, she produced and performed in a concert for the 25th anniversary concert of Astor Piazzolla’s "Four Seasons of Buenos Aires" in New York's Central Park.

=== Groups ===
From 2002 to 2007, St. John performed with the Canadian music ensemble Bowfire.

== Instruments ==
In 1997, upon winning the Canada Council Stradivarius Prize, St. John was given the two-year use of a Lyall Stradivarius built in 1702. In 1999, an anonymous donor lent St. John the 1779 "Salabue" Guadagnini. Since 2024, she has owned it.

== Ancalagon Records ==
In 1999, St. John founded the artist-owned record company Ancalagon LLC. She did so as a result of her dissatisfaction with the marketing and production approach of larger recording companies. St. John named the record company after her pet iguana, Ancalagon.

== Recordings ==
St. John's recordings have been popular on iTunes. Her Bach: The Six Sonatas and Partitas for Violin Solo was iTunes' best-selling double album of 2007. Her previous recording, Bach: The Concerto Album, rose to number one in the iTunes classical category in 2005, shortly after appearing in the "strongly recommended" section of Gramophone. Apolkalypse Now, featuring St. John as a member of the group Polkastra, was released on iTunes in 2009.

At the time of its release, St. John received considerable attention for her then controversial photo on the cover of her debut album, Bach Works for Violin Solo (1996). The photo showed her from the waist up, apparently topless, holding a violin positioned to hide her chest. The album sold over 25,000 copies, a best seller by the standards of the classical music industry. She said in 2002: "If this cover, being unusual, ... is responsible for a couple of people picking it up and listening to these incredibly great works of Bach that they would not otherwise have heard, then it is all worthwhile."

== Visual media ==
=== Music videos ===
St. John frequently produces and edits her own music videos, many of which are made available on YouTube. These include four videos of tracks from her "Shiksa" album. She has also participated in a video project series with dancer Stephanie Cadman, evoking the parallels between folk dancing and the dance movements of J. S. Bach.

=== Dear Lara ===
St. John wrote and directed the 2026 documentary feature film Dear Lara on the subject of sexual abuse of students by their instructors at many leading classical music conservatories. She conceived of the project after being contacted by multiple fellow survivors of abuse after her own story was told in a front-page Philadelphia Inquirer article in 2019.

== Recognition, notable reviews, and awards ==
St. John's work has been featured on NPR's All Things Considered, CNN's Showbiz Today, Fox News, the CBC, and the Bravo! special series, Live At the Rehearsal Hall. Three short films have been produced by Bravo! featuring St. John, High Wire Bach, Czardas Caprice and High Flying Bach. She has also appeared in People Magazine.

At the 2008 Beijing Olympics, gold medalist Nastia Liukin performed her floor routine to "Variations on Dark Eyes (Occhi Chornye)", from St. John's Gypsy album.

St. John's work has been reviewed by publications including The New York Times, the Los Angeles Times and U.S. News & World Report.

Her 2010 album, Mozart: Scott & Lara St. John / The Knights, won the 2011 Juno Classical Album of the Year – Large Ensemble or Soloist(s) with Large Ensemble Accompaniment

In 2018 she served as artistic curator for Wolf Trap Chamber Music at the Barns.

In 2020, St. John was appointed a member of the Order of Canada for "pushing the boundaries of classical interpretation as a solo violinist and for supporting diversity in the arts."

== Personal life ==
She is married to Stephen H. Judson. While not on tour, she is based in New York City.

She feels an affinity with reptiles. She previously owned a pet iguana named Ancalagon, after a dragon from J.R.R. Tolkien's Silmarillion. Her second iguana, named Cain, grew to five feet in length. She currently owns a Lesser Antillean iguana named Octavius.

Her native languages are English and French; she is also fluent in Spanish and Russian.

== Discography ==
- 1996 – Bach Works for Violin Solo, released by Well Tempered Productions
- 1997 – Gypsy, released by Well Tempered Productions
- 2002 – Bach: The Concerto Album, released by Ancalagon Records
- 2003 – Re: Bach, released by Sony Classical
- 2007 – Bach: The Six Sonatas & Partitas for Violin Solo, released by Ancalagon Records
- 2008 – Hindson: Violin Concerto; Corigliano: Suite from The Red Violin; Liszt/Martin Kennedy/St. John: Totentanz, released by Ancalagon Records
- 2009 – Vivaldi: The Four Seasons / Piazzolla: The Four Seasons of Buenos Aires, released by Ancalagon Records
- 2009 – Polkastra: Apolkalypse Now, released by Ancalagon Records
- 2010 – Mozart: Scott & Lara St. John / The Knights, released by Ancalagon Records, Winner 2011 Juno Classical Album of the Year – Large Ensemble or Soloist(s) with Large Ensemble Accompaniment
- 2012 – Bach Sonatas: Lara St. John, Violin & Marie-Pierre Langlamet, Harp, released by Ancalagon Records
- 2012 – Polkastra: I Do: The Wedding Album, released by Ancalagon Records
- 2013 – Bach: The Violin Concertos, released by Ancalagon Records
- 2014 – Schubert, released by Ancalagon Records
- 2015 – Shiksa, released by Ancalagon Records
- 2020 – Key of A: Beethoven Sonata No. 9, Opus 47 "Kreutzer", and Franck Sonata in A major, with Matt Herskowitz, piano, released by Ancalagon Records
- 2022 – she/her/hers, released by Ancalagon Records
- 2026 – Dear Lara Soundtrack, released by Ancalagon records
