= Efrem Zimbalist =

Russian violinist, composer, and conductor (1889–1985)

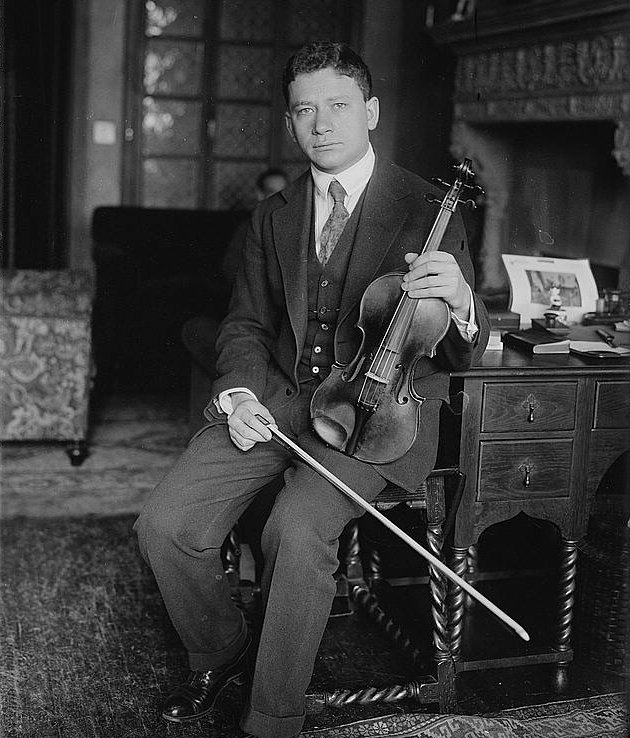
- Zimbalist with his violin, c. 1915 – c. 1920
- Born: Efrem Aleksandrovich Zimbalist (Russian: Ефрем Александрович Цимбалист); April 21 [O.S. April 9], 1889; Rostov-on-Don, Russian Empire
- Died: February 22, 1985 (aged 95); Reno, Nevada, U.S.
- Occupation: Violinist
- Spouse(s): Alma Gluck; Mary Louise Curtis Bok
- Children: Maria Virginia Zimbalist; Efrem Zimbalist Jr.
- Relatives: Stephanie Zimbalist (granddaughter)

Efrem Zimbalist (April 21 [O.S. April 9], 1889 – February 22, 1985) was a Russian and American concert violinist, composer, conductor and director of the Curtis Institute of Music.

== Early life ==
Efrem Zimbalist was born on April 9, 1889, O.S., equivalent to April 21, 1889 in the Gregorian calendar, in the southwestern Russian city of Rostov-on-Don, the son of Jewish parents Maria (née Litvinoff) and Aron Zimbalist (Цимбалист, Russian pronunciation: [tsɨmbɐˈlʲist]), a conductor. By the age of nine, Efrem Zimbalist was first violin in his father's orchestra. At age 12 he entered the Saint Petersburg Conservatory and studied under Leopold Auer. He graduated from the Conservatory in 1907 after winning a gold medal and the Rubinstein Prize, and by age 21 was considered one of the world's greatest violinists.

== Career ==
Efrem Zimbalist & Harold Bauer playing Theme and Variations from "The Kreutzer Sonata" by Beethoven (1926)

After graduation he debuted in Berlin (playing the Brahms Concerto) and London in 1907 and in the United States in 1911, with the Boston Symphony Orchestra, when he gave the first American performance of the Glazunov Violin Concerto. In 1912, he played the Glazunov Concerto in a concert marking Leopold Stokowski's first appearance with the London Symphony Orchestra. He then settled in the United States. He did much to popularize the performance of classical music in his adopted country. In 1917, he was elected as an honorary member of Phi Mu Alpha Sinfonia, the national fraternity for men in music, by the fraternity's Alpha Chapter at the New England Conservatory of Music in Boston. He retired as a violinist in 1949, but returned in 1952 to give the first performance of the Violin Concerto by Gian Carlo Menotti. He retired again in 1955. He served as a juror of the International Tchaikovsky Competition in 1962 and 1966.

Early in his career Zimbalist owned the "Titian" Stradivarius violin. He purchased the violin while on a trip with friend and world renowned violinist Jascha Heifetz for $33,000. At the time, around August 1923, the Titan was 208 years old, being created by Antonio Stradivari in 1715. It was ranked among the four finest violins in the world by European experts. The violin was later purchased by Felix M. Warburg as a quartet purchase that included "Viola Mac Donald" (1701), the "La Belle Blondine", and a recently restored (at the time) "Red" Stradivari, for $200,000. Mr. Warburg loaned all four to Sascha Jacobsen, Bernard Ocko, and Louis Kaufman, whose teacher was Franz Kneisel, as well as Marie Roemaet-Rosanov, a pupil of the great Pablo Casals, to play at Manhattan's Aeolian Hall.

=== Curtis Institute ===
In 1928, Zimbalist began teaching at the Curtis Institute of Music in Philadelphia. He was its director from 1941 to 1968. His pupils included such distinguished musicians as Lynn Blakeslee, Aaron Rosand, Oscar Shumsky, Norman Carol, Toshiya Eto, Joseph Silverstein, Jascha Brodsky, John Dalley, Michael Tree, Felix Slatkin, Shmuel Ashkenasi, Harold Wippler, Leonid Bolotine, Takaoki Sugitani, Helen Kwalwasser, and Hidetaro Suzuki.

=== Compositions ===
His own compositions include a violin concerto, a piano concerto (1959), the American Rhapsody, a tone poem called Daphnis and Chloe, a Fantasy on themes from The Golden Cockerel by Nikolai Rimsky-Korsakov, a Fantasy on Bizet's Carmen (1936), and a piece called Sarasateana, for viola and piano. He also wrote an opera, Landara, which premiered in 1956.

=== Dedications ===
Several composers dedicated their works to Zimbalist, including:

- František Drdla's Guitarrero
- Victor Küzdő's Promenade Grotesque
- Cyril Scott's Tallahassee
- Willem Willeke's Chant Sans Paroles
- Arnold Trowell's Op. 29 TARANTELLE to Efrem Zimbalist pour Violon et Piano (Laudy 1911)

=== Public life ===
Pablo Casals writes in his biography, Joys and Sorrows, that Zimbalist was a member of the Committee to Aid Spanish Democracy, chaired by Casals and founded by him in 1936.

== Personal life ==
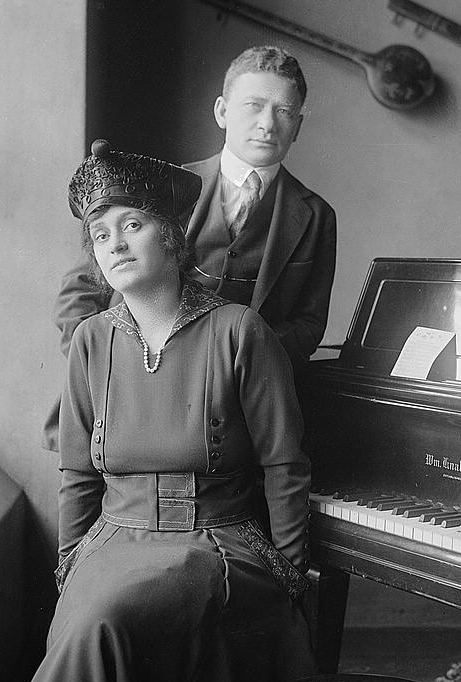
Zimbalist and Alma Gluck

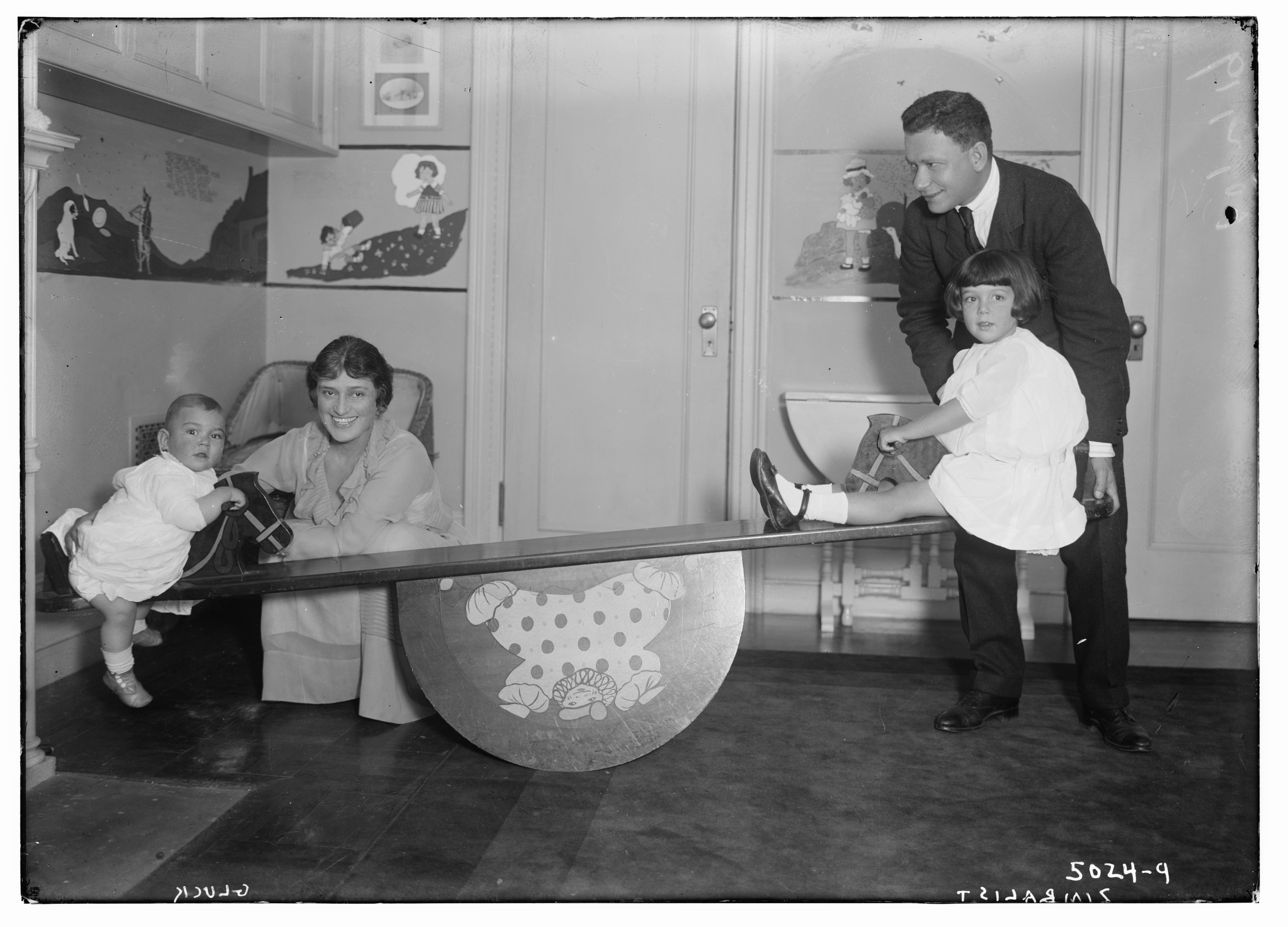
Alma Gluck and Zimbalist in photo dated 1915

Zimbalist married the famous American soprano Alma Gluck and they toured together for a time. She died in 1938. In 1943 he married the Curtis Institute of Music's founder, Mary Louise Curtis Bok, daughter of publisher Cyrus Curtis and Louisa Knapp Curtis, and 13 years his senior.

Although he continued to consider himself ethnically Jewish, he found himself attracted, along with his wife Alma, to Anglican Christianity, and they regularly attended the Episcopal Church in New Hartford. Efrem Jr. and Maria were both christened there, and the couple placed Efrem in an Episcopal boarding school in New Hampshire. Efrem Jr. later became active in evangelical circles and was one of the founders of Trinity Broadcasting Network.

He died in 1985, at the age of 95. His and Alma's son, Efrem Jr., and their granddaughter, Stephanie Zimbalist, both became actors, primarily in television. Efrem Jr. portrayed Dandy Jim Buckley in Maverick opposite James Garner, and the lead characters in the television series 77 Sunset Strip and The F.B.I.. Granddaughter Stephanie played the female lead in Remington Steele opposite Pierce Brosnan.

== Further ==
- Efrem Zimbalist: A Life – by Roy Malan. Pompton Plains, NJ: Amadeus Press, 2004 ISBN 1-57467-091-3
- Great Masters of the Violin – by Boris Schwarz. Simon and Schuster, 1983
