= David Cerone =

David Cerone was a co-founder of the ENCORE School for Strings, where he co-directed and served as faculty member since 1985. Mr. Cerone serves as a juror for many prominent national and international violin competitions and presents master classes around the world. An active chamber musician, he toured extensively with the Canterbury Trio from 1984 to 1989, under Columbia Artist Management. He was a Director of the Meadowmount School of Music and member of its faculty for 19 summers. Mr. Cerone is a board member of University Circle, Inc. and the Avery Fisher Artist Program. He is an Auxiliary Director of the International Board of the Suzuki Association. He was Professor of Violin at Oberlin Conservatory from 1962 to 1971 and Chairman of the String Department and Kulas Professor at the Cleveland Institute of Music (CIM) from 1971 to 1981. He was a member of the violin faculty at the Curtis Institute of Music from 1975 to 1985 and head of its violin department from 1981 to 1985. Mr. Cerone's extremely popular recordings of the Suzuki Violin Method Books I through IV have been reissued by Alfred Publishing. He presented a series of master classes, lectures and a recital for the Talent Education Research Institute's Teachers Convention in Hamamatsu, Japan, the first foreigner to address this illustrious group, and has performed in the St. Barts Music Festival for three seasons. Mr. Cerone served as president of CIM from 1985 to 2008. In 2011, David Cerone received a Lifetime Achievement Award from the Cleveland Arts Prize for his work with CIM and the arts community in Cleveland.

== Positions ==
- Oberlin Conservatory of Music, 1962–1971
- Cleveland Institute of Music, 1971–1981, String Department Chair
- Curtis Institute of Music, 1975–1985, Violin Department Chair, 1981–1985
- Cleveland Institute of Music, 1985–present, President, 1985–2008
