= Burgin =

Burgin or Bürgin may refer to:

== People ==
- Annie Burgin (1873–1955), American political hostess
- Diana Lewis Burgin, American author and professor of Russian
- Elise Burgin (born 1962), American tennis player
- Elizabeth Burgin, American patriot during the American Revolutionary War
- Emil Bürgin (1848–1933), Swiss engineer and industrialist
- Eric Burgin (1924–2012), English cricketer and footballer
- Graham Burgin (born 1948), Australian rules football player
- Jakob Bürgin, Swiss footballer
- Leslie Burgin (1887–1945), British politician
- Luc Bürgin (1970–2024), Swiss writer, publicist, and journalist
- Melchior Bürgin (born 1943), Swiss rower
- Mona Burgin (1903–1985), teacher and active in the Girl Guiding movement
- Nic Bürgin (born 1971), Swiss fencer
- Rachel Burgin (born 1982), Republican member of the Florida House of Representatives, United States
- Richard Burgin (violinist) (1893–1981), Polish-American violinist
- Richard Burgin (writer), American fiction writer, editor, composer, critic, and academic
- Romus Burgin (born 1922), WW II veteran and author
- Ted Burgin (1927–2019), English soccer player
- Victor Burgin (born 1941), English writer, artist
- William O. Burgin (1877–1946), United States Representative from North Carolina
- Yvonne Bürgin (born 1970), Swiss politician

== Places ==
- Burgin, Kentucky, United States
- Clarence Burgin House, Quincy, Massachusetts, United States
- Khirbat Umm Burj or Burgin, Israel

== See also ==
- Burgwyn, a surname
