= Burgwyn =

Burgwyn is a surname. Notable people with the surname include:

- H. James Burgwyn (born 1936), American historian
- Henry K. Burgwyn (1841–1863), Confederate colonel in the American Civil War, killed at the Battle of Gettysburg
- Mebane Holoman Burgwyn (1914–1992), American award-winning author of children's books
- Walter Burgwyn Jones (1888–1963), American judge, legislator, and writer

== See also ==
- Burgan (disambiguation)
- Burgen (disambiguation)
- Burgin (disambiguation)
- Burgon
