= Burgon =

Burgon is a surname. Notable people with the surname include:

- Archie Burgon (1912–1994), professional footballer
- Colin Burgon (born 1948), British Labour Party politician, Member of Parliament for Elmet 1997–2010
- Geoffrey Burgon (1941–2010), British composer notable for his television and film themes
- James Burgon Valentine (born 1978), American musician
- John Burgon (1813–1888), English Anglican divine, became Dean of Chichester Cathedral in 1876
- Richard Burgon (born 1980), British Labour Party politician, Member of Parliament (MP) for Leeds East since 2015 general
- Sid Burgon (born 1936), British comics artist

== See also ==
- Burgon Group, a group of Attic black-figure vase painters active in the middle third of the sixth century B.C.
- Burgon vase, an amphora from the Burgon group, the earliest known Panathenaic amphora
- Burgon Society, founded in 2000 for the study and promotion of academical dress to preserve its history and to advise in its correct usage
- Bourgon
