= Hypereides (potter) =

Hypereides (Ύπερείδες; fl. c. 560 BC), son of Androgenes was an Attic potter, active in Athens. He is known from his signature on two of the earliest Panathenaic prize amphorae, both found at Athens: Kerameikos PA 443 and Agora P 10204 .

== Bibliography ==
- Martin Bentz: Panathenäische Preisamphoren. Eine athenische Vasengattung und ihre Funktion vom 6. - 4. Jahrhundert v. Chr., Basel 1998, ISBN 3-909064-18-3, p. 123 Nr. 6.004-6.005.
- Künstlerlexikon der Antike Vol. 1, 2001, p. 331-332 s.v. Hypereides (Rainer Vollkommer)
