= Ruth Posselt =

American violinist (1911–2007)

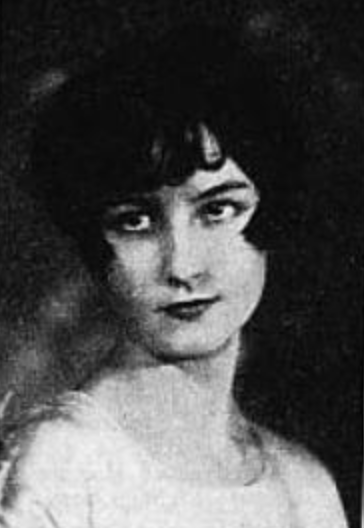
- Ruth Posselt, from a 1929 publication
- Born: September 6, 1911; Medford, Massachusetts, U.S.
- Died: February 19, 2007 (aged 95); Gulfport, Florida, U.S.
- Occupations: Violinist, music educator
- Spouse: Richard Burgin
- Children: Diana Lewis Burgin; Richard W. Burgin

Ruth Pierce Posselt (Medford, Massachusetts, September 6, 1911 – Gulfport, Florida, February 19, 2007) was an American violinist and educator.

== Studies and early career ==
Posselt studied violin with Emanuel Ondříček, a former student of Eugène Ysaÿe, and Jacques Thibaud and made her Carnegie Hall debut in 1923. She won the Schubert Memorial Prize in 1929, toured France, the Netherlands, Scandinavia, the Soviet Union in the early 1930s and made her first tour of the United States in 1935. She performed with the National Orchestral Association, the National Symphony Orchestra, the Columbia Symphony Orchestra and frequently with the Boston Symphony Orchestra. She was invited to perform at The White House by President and Mrs. Roosevelt in 1937. Posselt toured frequently as a recitalist, and formed a duo with pianist Luise Vosgerchian in 1958.

== Premieres ==
Posselt performed several world premieres in her career, including Walter Piston's First Violin Concerto, a piece which was written for her, in 1940. (Violin Concerto No. 1) She also premiered a violin concerto by Vladimir Dukelsky, a.k.a. Vernon Duke, with the Boston Symphony Orchestra and conductor Serge Koussevitsky in March 1943. Also with the Boston Symphony Orchestra, Posselt premiered violin concertos by composers Edward Burlingame Hill (Concerto for Violin, Opus 38), in 1939, and Samuel Barber (revised version of Concerto for Violin and Orchestra), in 1949, and played the New York premiere of Paul Hindemith's Violin Concerto in 1941. In 1944, Posselt premiered Aaron Copland's Violin Sonata with the composer at the piano.

In 1963 & 1967, she was a soloist with the Naumburg Orchestral Concerts, in the Naumburg Bandshell, Central Park, in the summer series.

She married violinist, concertmaster, and conductor Richard Burgin on July 3, 1940. Their son, Richard W. Burgin, was the author of numerous short-story collections and novels. Their daughter, Diana Lewis Burgin, is an author and professor of Russian at the University of Massachusetts Amherst

From 1958, Posselt performed on a 1732 Giuseppe Guarneri "Del Gesu" known as the "Posselt, Phillip". The instrument takes its name from a previous owner, Phillip, and dates from the peak period of Guarneri del Gesù's output. Posselt acquired the violin around the time she formed her duo with Luise Vosgerchian, and it remained her primary concert instrument for the rest of her performing career. The violin is catalogued in the Henley and Jalovec references on Guarneri instruments and is among the named specimens of del Gesù's work held in private hands in the United States during the twentieth century. A full biographical account of Posselt's life and career, including her relationship with the instrument, is documented in Performing Life: The Story of Ruth Posselt, American Violinist, written by her daughter Diana Lewis Burgin and published by the University of Massachusetts Press in 2016.

== Recordings ==
- BOSTON B-209 LP 195x
  - Brahms / Wenzel (Posselt)
- DECCA DL 9635 LP 1952
  - Beethoven Trios – Bel Arte Trio
- DECCA DL 9659 LP 1952 / BRUNSWICK(UK) AXTL 1031
  - MOZART: Divertimento: for Violin, Viola & Cello
    - THE BEL ARTE TRIO Ruth Posselt, violin; Joseph DePasquale, viola; Samuel Mayes, 'cello
- KAPP KCL 9024 LP / UNICORN UNLP 1030 (reissue).
  - Italian music for strings of the baroque period.
  - Cambridge Society for Early Music; Erwin Bodky, director;
    - Concerto in A major for violin, strings and continuo (The Pisendel-Concerto) / Vivaldi --
    - Sonata for violin and continuo in B minor, op. 1, no. 3 / Veracini --
    - Sonata in C major for 2 violins and continuo, op. 3, no. 1 / Dall'Abaco --
    - Concerto in D minor for violin, strings and continuo / Torelli --
    - Trio sonata in A major, op. 1, no. 3 for 2 violins and continuo / Albinoni.
- COLUMBIA ML 4996 LP 1955 / SONY SMK 60725 CD
  - Lopatnikoff: Concertino; Dallapiccola: Tartiniana (POSSELT, vln); Shapero: Symphony for Classical Orchestra.

== Teaching ==
Posselt taught and performed at Florida State University from 1963 to 1978, coming to the school as a visiting artist, continuing her stay as an artist in residence and member of the Florestan String Quartet, with her husband. Posselt eventually became a professor at the University. She also taught privately at Wellesley College and New England Conservatory.
