= Richard W. Burgin =

American writer, professor, composer (1947–2020)

Richard Burgin
- Born: Richard Weston Burgin; June 30, 1947; Brookline, Massachusetts, U.S.
- Died: October 22, 2020 (aged 73); Clayton, Missouri, U.S.
- Occupations: Novelist, short story writer, poet, literary critic, professor, editor
- Writing career
- Years active: 1968–2020
- Period: Contemporary
- Genres: Fiction, Criticism
- Notable works: Debut Criticism: Conversations with Jorge Luis Borges (1968); Debut fiction: The Man with Missing Parts (1973); Debut Short Story Collection: Man Without Memory (1989); Debut Novel: Ghost Quartet(1999)
- Movement: Meta-Realism

Richard Weston Burgin (June 30, 1947 – October 22, 2020) was an American fiction writer, editor, composer, critic, and academic. He published nineteen books, and from 1996 through 2013 was a professor of Communications and English at Saint Louis University. He was also the founder and publisher of the internationally distributed award-winning literary magazine Boulevard.

== Life and career ==
Richard Weston Burgin was born June 30, 1947, and grew up in Brookline, Massachusetts. His father, also named Richard Burgin, was the Concertmaster and Associate Conductor of the Boston Symphony Orchestra, and his mother, Ruth Posselt, was a concert violinist, who was the first American-born woman violinist to extensively tour Russia. Both his parents were child prodigies. His sister Diana is a professor, translator, and critic of Russian literature. Burgin went to Brandeis University, where he received a B.A. He later received a Master's with highest honors from Columbia University. His first published book was a collection of interviews he conducted with the Latin American writer, Jorge Luis Borges, while Burgin was still an undergraduate. Conversations with Jorge Luis Borges (Holt, Rinehart and Winston, 1969) was the first book-length series of interviews with Borges in English and has been translated and published in ten foreign language editions. A substantial part of the book was reprinted in Jorge Luis Borges: The Last Interviews by Melville House in 2013.

In 1975 he was one of the founding editors of the New Boston Review, now Boston Review magazine. In 1985 he published Conversations with Isaac Bashevis Singer, which to date has been translated into eight foreign language editions. A major part appeared as a two-part cover story in the New York Times Magazine. His stories have received numerous prizes and awards, including five Pushcart Prizes. Among his nineteen published books, The Identity Club: New and Selected Stories and Songs (Ontario Review Press, 2005 which included a 20-song disc of music composed by Burgin) was listed by The Times Literary Supplement as one of the best books of 2006. The Huffington Post recently named it one of the 40 best books of fiction in the last decade. The title story of The Identity Club was reprinted in Best American Mystery Stories 2005 and The Ecco Anthology of Contemporary American Short Fiction (Harper Perennial, 2008) edited by Joyce Carol Oates. Writing in the Daily Beast/Newsweek, Joyce Carol Oates said, "What Edgar Allan Poe did for the psychotic soul, Richard Burgin does for the deeply neurotic who pass among us disguised as so seemingly 'normal,' we may mistake them for ourselves." In an interview published in the literary journal Pleiades, Burgin said, "My goal is and always has been to depict people as honestly as I know them, which means writing about their mistakes as well as their victories, their fear as well as their courage (the two are always mixed), their cruelty or selfishness as well as their kindness." In another interview, with The Philadelphia Inquirer, he said, "One of the things I try to achieve in some of my short stories is a kind of novelistic density or weight. My stories tend to have a number of characters, a period of time going by, and character and thematic development."

As a critic, Burgin published numerous essays and reviews in (among many others) The New York Times Book Review, The Washington Post, Chicago Tribune, Partisan Review, Chicago Review,The Philadelphia Inquirer, and The Boston Globe, where he was a columnist for both the paper and The Globe Magazine.

Texas Review Press published Burgin's novel Rivers Last Longer in November 2010. The anthology L'Ecume des Flammes, a Richard Burgin Reader, was published in February 2011 (in French) by 13e Note Editions. Reviewing the book in Le Monde, critic Florence Noiville wrote, "There is something electrifying, even addictive, in the writing of Richard Burgin." In 2011, Johns Hopkins University Press published Burgin's story collection Shadow Traffic. This was followed by Hide Island: A Novella and Nine Stories (2013). His most recent book is Don't Think, a story collection published by Johns Hopkins University Press in 2016.

Burgin founded the literary journal Boulevard in 1985 and continued to edit it through 2015. In an interview for the book Creating Fiction: A Writer's Companion (Harcourt Brace, 1995) Burgin said, "At Boulevard we're open to different styles of writing. We try to be eclectic in the best sense of the word and to be mindful of Nabokov's dictum, 'there's only one school, the school of talent'"." Boulevard has been called "one of the half-dozen best literary journals" by Poet Laureate Daniel Hoffman. Pulitzer Prize–winning poet Charles Simic, writing in the New York Review of Books said, "Boulevard [is one of the eight magazines] young writers and poets, of course, pay attention to...since that's where they hope to publish their work." In April 2015, Burgin edited (with Jessica Rogen) The Best Stories from Boulevard, 1985-2015 Volume 1. In addition to Boulevard and Boston Review, Burgin was the founding editor of the New York Arts Journal. He taught at Tufts University, Drexel University, University of California at Santa Barbara. Most recently, he was professor of communication and English at Saint Louis University from 1996 to 2013.

Burgin also composed the music and words for six CDs, one of which was co-produced with Gloria Vanderbilt.

On October 22, 2020, Burgin died in his sleep at his home in Clayton, Missouri, after a long battle with Parkinson's disease.

His son Richard Burgin is a filmmaker, whom Burgin collaborated with on two short films based on his short stories, All Ears (2016) and The Identity Club (2018). After his death, Fang (2022) was dedicated to Richard W. Burgin in the end credits.

== Books ==
=== Selected works ===
- L'Ecume des Flammes (A Richard Burgin reader published in French by 13e Note Editions, 2011)

=== Novels ===
- The Memory Center (2012) (Novella)
- Rivers Last Longer (2010)
- Ghost Quartet (1999)

=== Short story collections ===
- Don't Think (April 2016)
- Hide Island: A Novella and Nine Stories (2013)
- Shadow Traffic: Stories (2011)
- The Conference on Beautiful Moments (2007)
- The Identity Club: New and Selected Stories and Songs (2006)
- The Spirit Returns (2001)
- Fear of Blue Skies (1998)
- Private Fame (1991)
- Man Without Memory (1989)

=== Interview Books ===
- Conversations with Isaac Bashevis Singer (1985)
- Conversations with Jorge Luis Borges (1969)

=== Edited books ===
- Jorge Luis Borges: Conversations (1998)
- The Best Stories from Boulevard - 1985-2015 Volume 1 with Jessica Rogen (2015)

=== Collaborations ===
- Stories and Dream Boxes with art by Gloria Vanderbilt (2002)
- The Man With Missing Parts, a novella with J. M. Alonso (1973)

== Prizes and anthologies ==
- Jorge Luis Borges: The Last Interview and Other Conversations - "Original Mythology", pp. 3–124 (From Conversations with Jorge Juis Borges, 1968, by Richard Burgin) (2013)
- New Jersey Noir - "Atlantis" (fiction) (2011) (Akashic Books)
- New Stories from the Midwest 2011 - "Do You Like This Room" - (Ohio University Press)
- Le Livre Des Felures: 31 Histoires Cousues De Fil Noir - "La Nuit Oceane" (fiction) (2010)(13E Note Editions)
- The Best American Mystery Stories 2005 - "The Identity Club" (2005) (Houghton Mifflin Harcourt)
- So the Story Goes - "Bodysurfing" (fiction) (2005) (The Johns Hopkins University Press)
- The Ecco Anthology of Contemporary American Short Fiction selected by Joyce Carol Oates - "The Identity Club" (fiction) (2008)(Harper Perennial)
- The Show I'll Never Forget - "Bill Evans at the Jazz Workshop" (Essay) (2007) (Da Capo Press)
- 2007 Pushcart Prize - "Vacation" (fiction) (Pushcart Press)
- Witness: Our Best 2987–2004 Fiction, Poetry & Nonfiction - "Bodysurfing" (fiction) (2004) (Michigan State University Press)
- 2004 Under the Arch: St. Louis Stories - "The Park..." (fiction) (2004) (Antares Press)
- 2002 Pushcart Prize - "Miles" (fiction) (Pushcart Press)
- 1999 Pushcart Prize - "Bodysurfing" (fiction) (Pushcart Press)
- American Fiction Volume 10: The Best Unpublished Short Stories by Emerging Writers - "Nouina's House" (1999) (New Rivers Press)
- Critical Essays on Isaac Bashevis Singer - "The Sly Modernism of Isaac Singer" (Essay) (1996) (G. I. Hall & Co.)
- The Philomathean Society Anthology of Poetry - "Concertmaster, for My Father" and "Necessary Night" (Poems) (1996) (Philomathean Society Press)
- Creating Fiction: A Writer's Companion - "Emotional Real Estate: An Interview with Richard Burgin" (Interview)(1995)(Harcourt Brace College Publishers)
- Isaac Bashevis Singer: Conversations - "Conversations with Isaac Bashevis Singer" (Interview) (1992)(University Press of Mississippi)
- 1986 Pushcart Prize - "The Victims" (fiction) (Pushcart Press)
- Storytellers: A Serial Fiction Anthology - "Man Without Memory" (Fiction) (1986) (Foundation for Arts Resources)
- 1982 Pushcart Prize - "Notes on Mrs. Slaughter" (fiction) (Pushcart Press)
- Anthology of Magazine Verse & Yearbook of American Poetry - "Concertmaster" (Poetry) (1981) (Monitor Book Company, Inc.)
- Vol. 1 American Writing Today - "The Sly Modernism of Isaac Singer" (Essay) (1980) (Forum Series)
- Behind the Scenes: Theater and Film Interview From the Transatlantic Review - "Jorge Luis Borges" (Interview) (1971) (Holt, Rinehart and Winston, Inc.)

== Periodicals edited ==
- founding editor of Boston Review (formerly Boston Arts Review), 1975
- founding editor of New York Arts Journal, 1975–1982
- founding and current editor of Boulevard, 1985–present

== CDs composed and written by Richard W. Burgin ==
- The Trouble with Love (2008) (CD Baby)
- Don't Go There (Included with the book The Identity Club: New and Selected Stories and Songs) (2005)
- Cold Ocean (2005)
- Gloria Vanderbilt's Doll of Dreams (2005) (Produced by Gloria Vanderbilt)
- House of Sun (2001)
- In All of the World (2000)
