= Burgon Group =

Attic vase painters

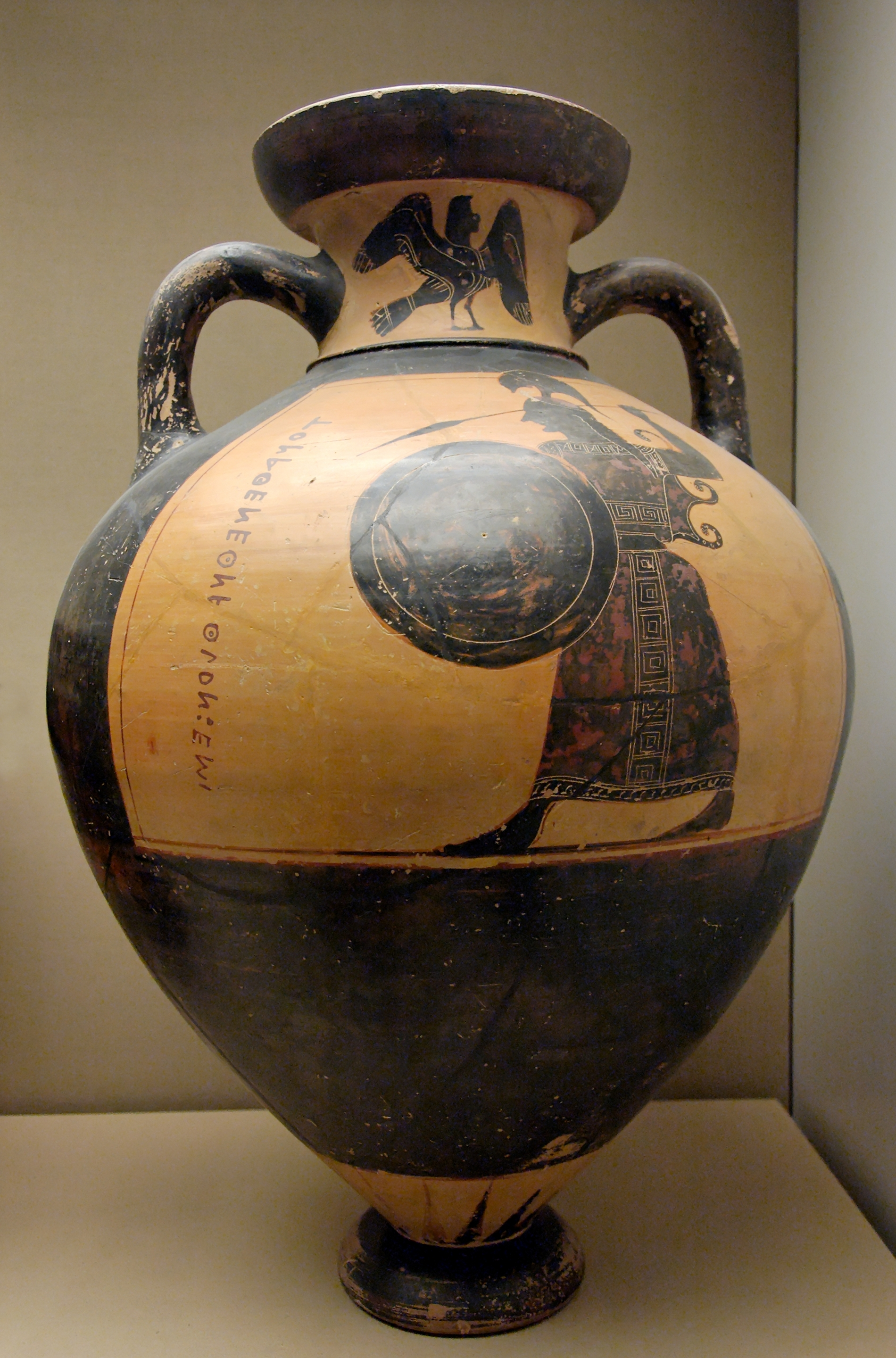
Panathenaic amphora, British Museum (London) circa 565/560 BC.

Burgon Group is the conventional name given to a group of Attic black-figure vase painters active in the middle third of the sixth century BC.

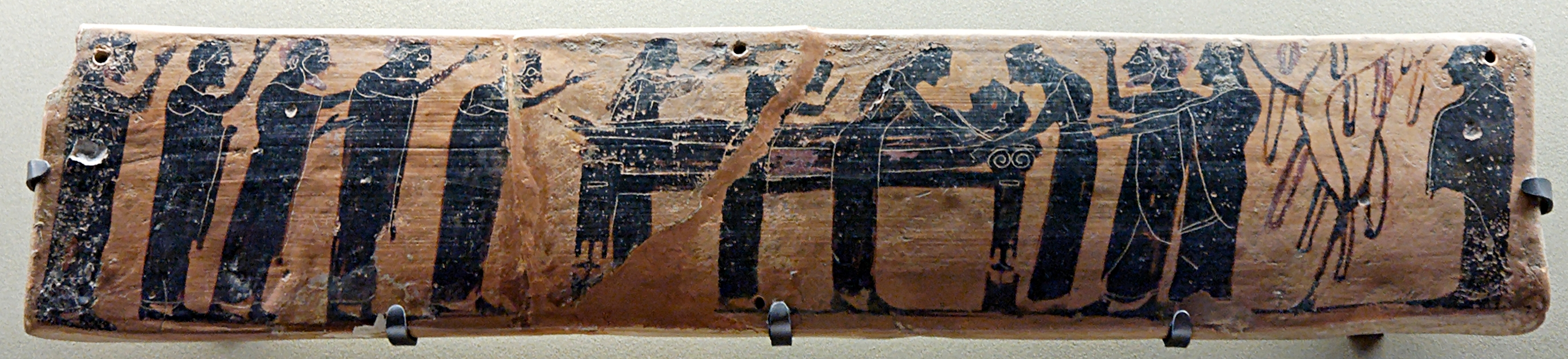
Pinax by the Burgon Group: Prothesis scene, The Louvre CA 255.

The group’s name is derived from Thomas Burgon (1787–1858), who supervised the 1813 excavations in Athens, during which the Panathenaic prize amphora London B 160, now on display in the British Museum, was discovered. The group, recognized by modern scholarship on the basis of stylistic similarities to numerous vases, is particularly important for having produced the earliest known Panathenaic amphora, the Burgon vase (the group’s name vase). As usual for such amphorae, the front image depicts the goddess Athena and the back shows a two-horse chariot during a race. Another famous piece is a Siana cup with a sowing scene, perhaps of mythological relevance. The Painter of London B 76 is stylistically closely related to the Burgon Group.

== Bibliography ==
- John Beazley: Attic Black-figure Vase-painters. Oxford 1956
- John Boardman: Schwarzfigurige Vasen aus Athen. Ein Handbuch, von Zabern, Mainz 1977 (Kulturgeschichte der Antiken Welt, Vol 1) ISBN 3-8053-0233-9, p. 40
