= Burgon vase =

6th-century BC Panathenaic amphora

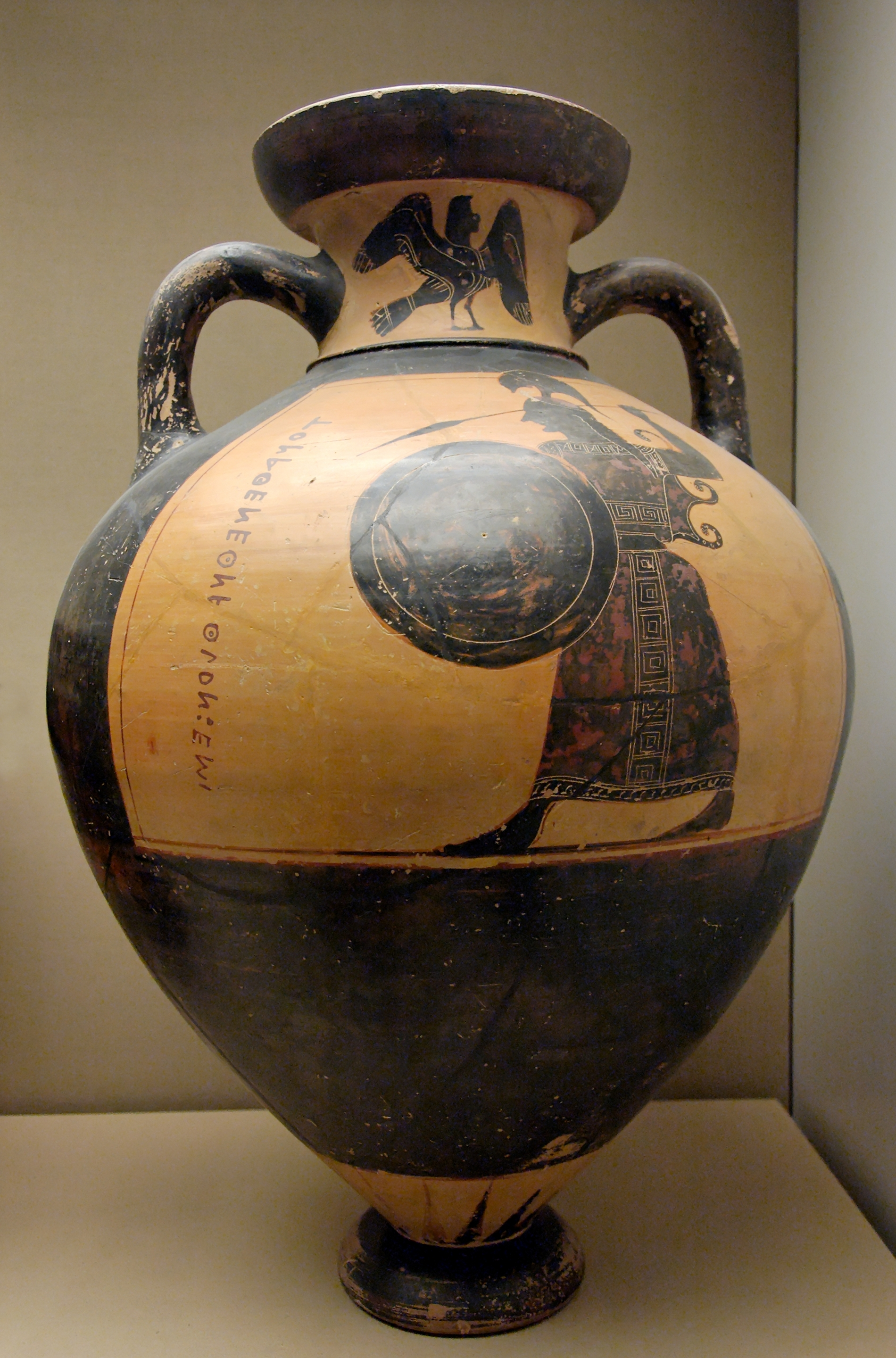

The Burgon vase is the earliest known Panathenaic amphora, dating to around 560 BC, and the name vase for the ancient Greek painter of the Burgon Group. Today it is on display in the British Museum. The 61 cm high vase is short and squat, with a very low mouth and short neck. The handles are close to the body and small. The foot is tiny in proportion to the vase. The amphora was uncovered in 1813 in Athens and is named after Thomas Burgon (1787–1858), a merchant of the Levant Company, who brought it to England and sold it to the museum. It was discovered full of bone fragments, having been used as a funerary urn. The back side of the vase was seriously damaged by a pick-axe during the excavation.

== Description ==
The vase is painted in the black-figure style with images of the Greek goddess Athena, a flying siren and an owl, as well as a two-horse chariot.

Athena is facing to the left. She wears a helmet with a low crest; its main section resembles a cap. The left arm swings a spear with a very carefully illustrated tip. The clothing of the goddess consists of a long sleeveless peplos belted at the waist. The diploidion – a part of the peplos whipped over the shoulders – is decorated with a meander, while the skirt itself is decorated with a vertical band, which consists of full squares, and with a hem. Athena's feet are placed apart, firmly on the ground line. The aegis' border of snakes is represented by two large writhing snakes and one peeping up over her shoulder. The shield which Athena bears with her right arm, bears a dolphin facing to the left.

Left of Athena is the inscription, written from right to left, ΤΟΝΑΘΕΝΕΘ(Ε)ΝΑΘΛΟΝΕΜΙ ("I am (one) of the prizes from Athens") in sixth-century BC orthography.

On the back side of the vase there is a beardless, seated charioteer wearing red clothing. His feet on a running board, he drives a two-horse chariot to the right. He holds the reins in his right hand and the kalaurops (staff with bells), to goad the horse on. The shape of the wheels, with only two spokes and two reinforcing struts extending perpendicular to them resembles the bronze wheel from Olympia.

On the unornamented neck there is a siren on the front and an owl on the back, both with their wings held in exactly the same posture.

== Bibliography ==
- Peter Oluf Brøndsted; William Roger Hamilton; John Burgon: Mémoire sur les vases panathénaïques: adressé, en forme de lettre à M. W. R. Hamilton, Firmin Didot frères, Paris 1833.
- Georg von Brauchitsch, Die panathenäischen Preisamphoren, Teubner: Leipzig, 1910, pp. 6–8 (online)
