= Burgen =

Burgen may refer to:

- Burgen, Bernkastel-Wittlich, municipality in Rhineland-Palatinate, Germany
- Burgen, Mayen-Koblenz, municipality in Rhineland-Palatinate, gany

== People with the surname ==
- Arnold Burgen (1922–2022), British scientist
- Jim Burgen, American pastor
