= Luc Bürgin =

Swiss writer (1970–2024)

Luc Bürgin (19 August 1970 – 11 May 2024) was a Swiss writer, publicist, and journalist. From 1996 to 2002, Bürgin studied German literature, folklore, musicology, media studies and sociology at the University of Basel. He has served as a journalist for Basler Zeitung Medien and as editor in chief of Baslerstab. He is best known for his writings on fringe science and popular science. Bürgin died on 11 May 2024, at the age of 53.

== Der Urzeit-Code ==
Published in 2007, Bürgin's book Der Urzeit-Code (The Primeval Code), is a popular science book dealing with a patent granted in 1980 to the chemical company Ciba-Geigy (now Novartis), which deals with the process of electroculture, which helped to increase the resilience of crops and reduce the use of pesticides on treated crops. The book details reports and interviews that document the effect of the electroculture process which had not been previously explained scientifically. In the book, Bürgin presents electroculture as a more ecologically-friendly alternative to genetic engineering.

== Works ==
- Götterspuren: Der neue UFO-Report (in German). Herbig, München 1993, ISBN 3-7766-1806-X.
- Mondblitze: Unterdrückte Entdeckungen in Raumfahrt und Wissenschaft (in German). Herbig, München 1994, ISBN 3-7766-1849-3.
- Irrtümer der Wissenschaft: Verkannte Genies, Erfinderpech und kapitale Fehlurteile (in German). Herbig, München 1997, ISBN 3-7766-1986-4.
- Geheimakte Archäologie: Unterdrückte Entdeckungen, verschollene Schätze, bizarre Funde (in German). Bettendorf, München 1998, ISBN 3-7766-7002-9.
- UFOs über der Schweiz: Das Dossier der Luftwaffe (in German). Kopp, Rottenburg 1999, ISBN 3-930219-27-1.
- Rätsel der Archäologie: Unerwartete Entdeckungen, unerforschte Monumente (in German). Herbig, München 2003, ISBN 3-7766-2318-7.
- Hochtechnologie im Altertum: Flüsternde Steine, magische Spiegel, ewiges Licht (in German). Kopp, Rottenburg 2003, ISBN 3-930219-67-0.
- Das Wunder Mirin Dajo: Der unverletzbare Prophet und seine paranormalen Kräfte (in German). Kopp, Rottenburg 2004, ISBN 3-930219-74-3.
- Psst… streng vertraulich: Brisante Enthüllungen, die man Ihnen verheimlichen wollte (in German). Kopp, Rottenburg 2006, ISBN 3-938516-36-4.
- Der Urzeit-Code: Die ökologische Alternative zur umstrittenen Gen-Technologie (in German). Herbig, Luc Bürgin München 2007, ISBN 978-3-7766-2534-9.
- Lexikon der verbotenen Archäologie: Mysteriöse Relikte von A bis Z (in German). Kopp, Rottenburg 2009, ISBN 978-3-942016-14-8.
- Mystery: Neue Beweise für das Unerklärliche (in German). Kopp, Rottenburg 2012, ISBN 978-3-86445-049-5.
- Chinas mysteriöses Höhlenlabyrinth: Die unterirdische Welt von Huangshan (in German). Kopp, Rottenburg 2013, ISBN 978-3-86445-058-7.
- Geheimdossier UFOs: Die Akten der Schweizer Luftwaffe (in German). Kopp, Rottenburg 2015, ISBN 978-3-86445-210-9.
- Lexikon der verbotenen Geschichte: Verheimlichte Entdeckungen von A bis Z (in German). Kopp, Rottenburg 2018, ISBN 978-3-86445-562-9.
- Neues aus Absurdistan: Sind wir noch zu retten? (in German). Kopp, Rottenburg 2020, ISBN 978-3-86445-744-9.
- Geheimnisse der Matrix: Der neue Mystery-Report (in German). Kopp, Rottenburg 2021, ISBN 978-3-86445-851-4.
- Das letzte Geheimnis von Mirin Dajo (in German). Kopp, Rottenburg 2022, ISBN 978-3-86445-883-5.

== Sources ==
- https://web.archive.org/web/20121105104612/http://tatjana.ingold.ch/index.php?id=goetterspuren
- http://literaturtest.net/text/buch/rezensio/b/buergin.html%5B%5D
- Commercial Register: Dr. A. Hedri Foundation for Exopsychology and Epipsychology.
- http://www.easymonitoring.ch/handelsregister/dr-a-hedri-stiftung-fuer-exopsychologie-und-epipsychologie-275592 Easymonitoring AG, 23 June 2003, accessed on 2 February 2014 .
