= Khirbat Umm Burj =

Khirbat Umm Burj خربة أم برج
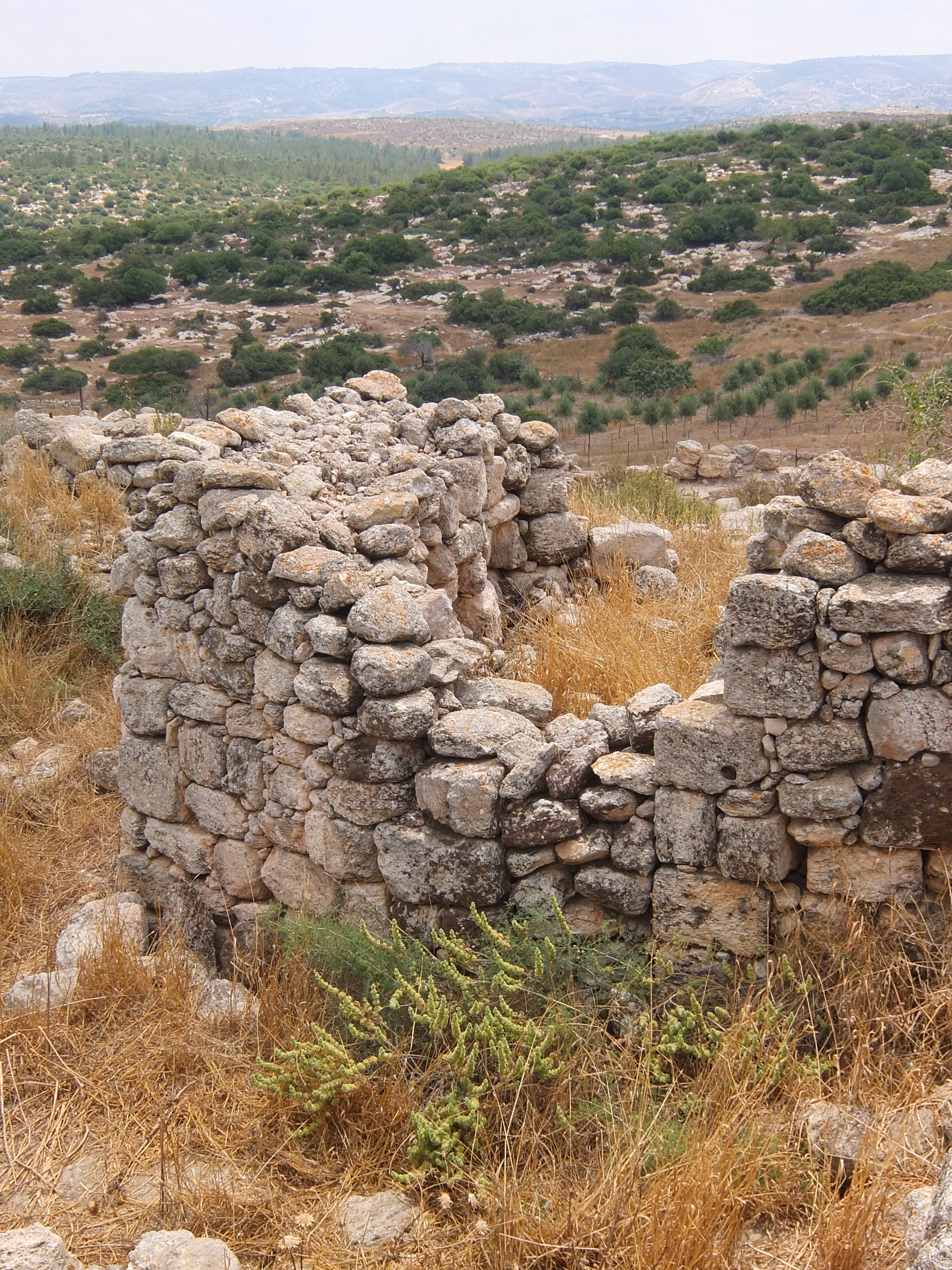
- Khirbat Umm Burj (ruined house)
- Etymology: the mother of the tower
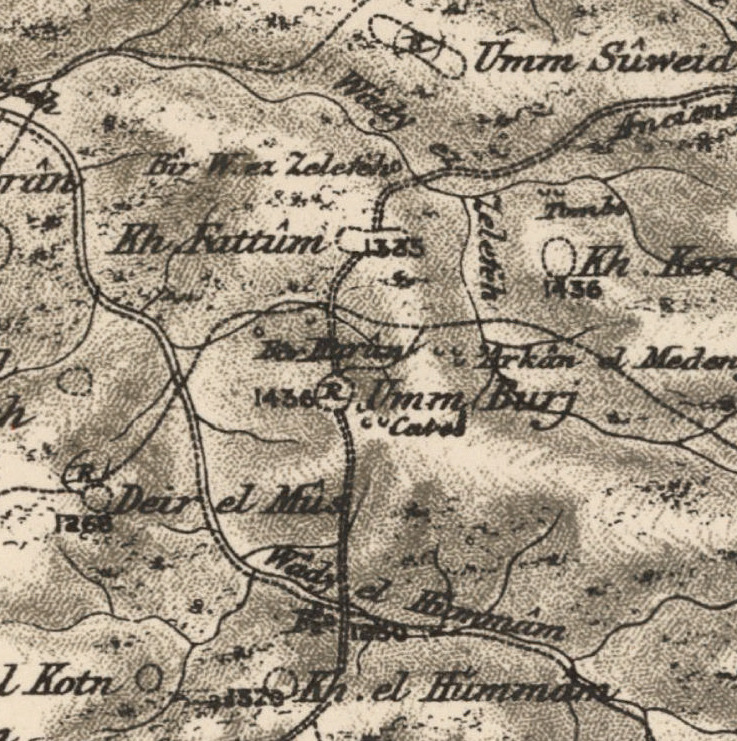
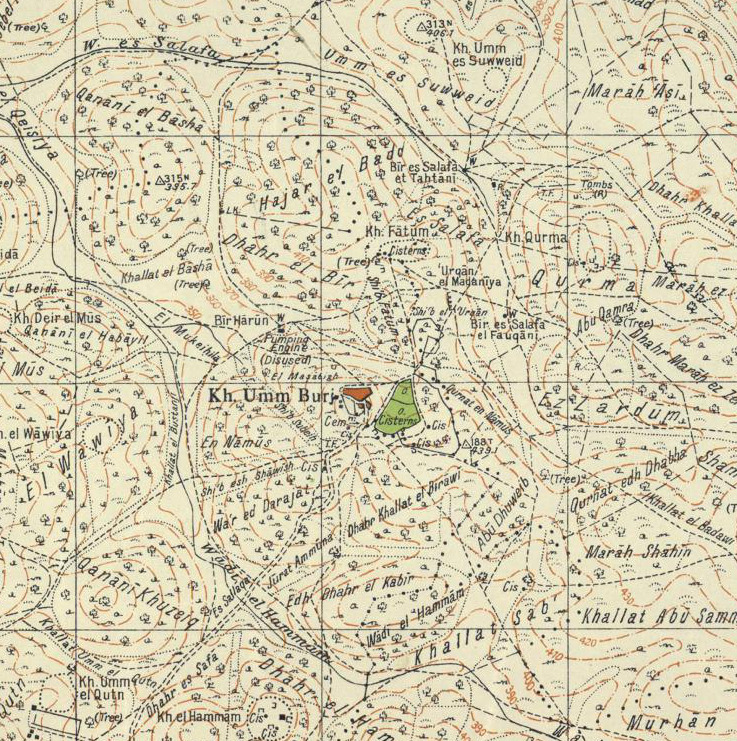
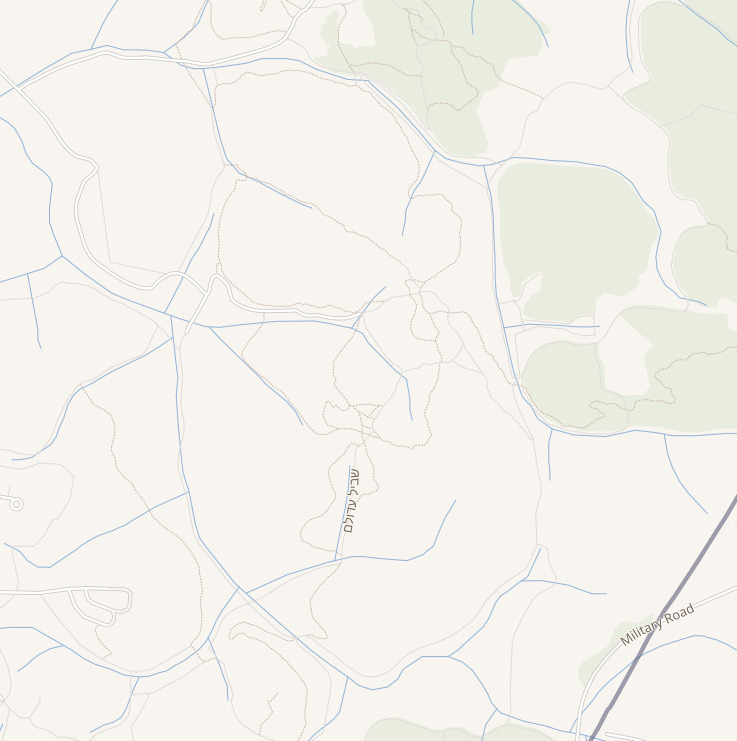
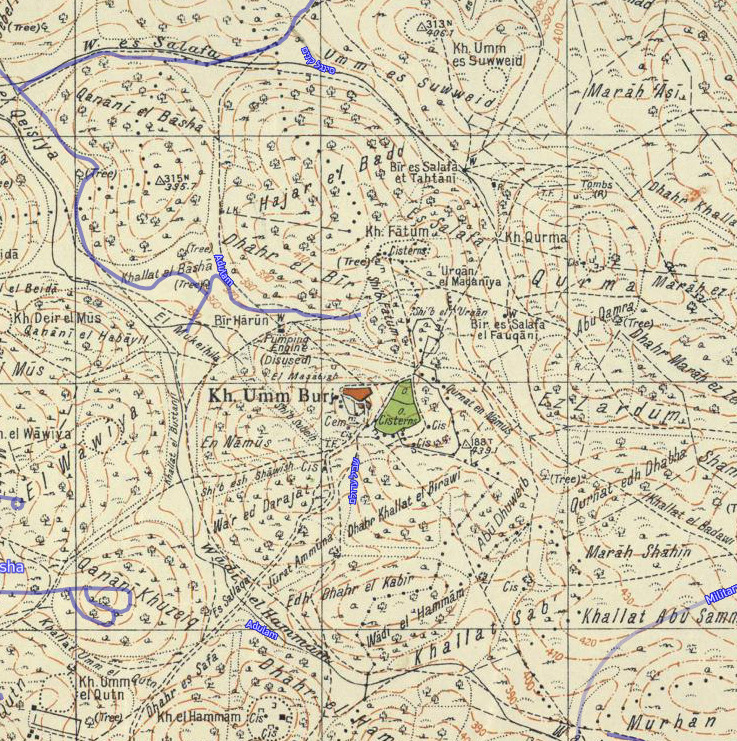
- 1870s map 1940s map modern map 1940s with modern overlay map A series of historical maps of the area around Khirbat Umm Burj (click the buttons)

- Location within Mandatory Palestine
- Coordinates: 31°38′12″N 34°58′11″E
- Palestine grid: 147/115
- Geopolitical entity: Mandatory Palestine
- Subdistrict: Hebron
- Date of depopulation: Not known

Area
  - Total: 13,083 dunams (13.083 km^{2}; 5.051 sq mi)

Population (1945)
  - Total: 140
- Current Localities: Nehusha

Khirbat Umm Burj was a Palestinian Arab village in the Hebron Subdistrict, sometimes designated in modern maps as Burgin. Its ruins are today located within the borders of Israel. It occupied an extensive site, stretching about 30 dunams (7.4 acres) on the crest of a hill, rising some 430 metres (1,410 ft) above sea level, and commanding a good prospect of the surrounding region. It was depopulated during the 1948 Arab–Israeli War on October 28, 1948, during the third stage of Operation Yo'av under the command of Yigal Allon. The site is located 17 km northwest of Hebron.

== History ==
The site was occupied from the Iron Age. A large ancient necropolis was here, including a church or synagogue, residential buildings and numerous agricultural installations. Israeli archaeologists, Amir Ganor and Boaz Zissu, think that Umm Burj may be a corruption of the 1st-century Jewish village, Kefar Bish, a view earlier rejected by Klein who said that Kefar Bish still bears its namesake in the nearby ruin of Khirbet al-Bis. A Jewish inscription, possibly dating from the Bar Kokhba revolt, has been found in a hiding complex at the site; it mentions a "Shelamzion daughter of...".

In the late 19th century, extensive Christian remains were noted in the area surrounding Umm Burj. Finnish scholar, Aapeli Saarisalo, visited the site of Umm Burj in the early 20th-century, and described its ruins as being of Byzantine and Arab origin.

=== Late Ottoman period ===
In 1838 Um Burj was noted as village, located in the area between the mountains and Gaza, but subject to the government of el-Khulil.

In 1863, Victor Guérin passed north of Khirbat Umm Burj, and described the village as being on a mountain, dominating the surroundings.

An Ottoman village list from about 1870 found that um-burdsch had a population of 150, in 25 houses, though the population count included men, only.

French orientalist and archaeologist, Charles Clermont-Ganneau, visited the site in 1874 where he noticed a well situated nearby, called Bîr Hârûn, surmounted with a rude structure, near which were troughs hollowed out in large stone blocks.

In 1883, the PEF's Survey of Western Palestine (SWP) described Umm Burj as: "A ruined village, with a central tower; apparently not ancient; caves and cisterns round it, and a well". Khalidi believed that the SWP assumption that the tower was not ancient might have been wrong.

The village was settled in the 19th century by the Al-Husayni family, who purchased the land, that was initially proposed for purchase by Jews.

=== British Mandate period ===
In the 1931 census of Palestine, Umm Burj and Sanabra, listed in the sub-district of Hebron, had a joint population of 119 Muslims, in a total of 26 houses.

In the 1945 statistics it had a population of 140 Muslims, with a total of 13,083 dunums of land. Of this, 28 dunums were irrigated or used for plantations, 3,546 were for cereal, while 15 dunams were built-up (urban) areas.

The villagers used to obtain drinking water from three wells on the northern outskirts of the village.

=== 1948 and aftermath ===
According to a February 26, 2026 Haaretz investigation, one file opened for public inspection concerned the killing of three elderly Arabs—two women and one man—in the village. The report states that the village was captured in July 1948, and that three months later soldiers debated how to dispose of four Arabs who remained there. Private Aryeh Ben-Shem of Battalion 143 testified that one of the four worked for the soldiers in the kitchen and was spared. Regarding the other three, Ben-Shem testified that Lieutenant Yosef Fishel ordered the soldiers to bring them into a building and fire a PIAT round at it, telling them to “finish them.” After the round missed, the report says the soldiers threw grenades into the structure and then set it on fire. One soldier testified that upon entering the house, one victim was dying and he shot him, while the other two lay on the ground unresponsive after being kicked. Another soldier testified that “eliminating Arabs by order from someone in authority” was not surprising because he had heard of many similar cases.

After the 1948 Arab–Israeli War, the ruin of Umm Burj came under Israeli control under the terms of the 1949 Armistice Agreements between Israel and Jordan.

Today, the site lies in the Adullam-France Park.

The moshav of Nehusha was established in 1955 on land that had belonged to the village, west of the village site, but collapsed in 1968. It was re-established in 1981.

== Archaeology ==
In the years 1995 to 2012, archaeological fieldwork was conducted by a team of archaeologists at Khirbet Umm Burj on behalf of the Israel Antiquities Authority (IAA), among whom were Boaz Zissu and Amir Golan, et al., where they uncovered at the site two Byzantine churches, and a Jewish inscription incised on a doorjamb of an underground room in a hiding tunnel system.

== Gallery ==
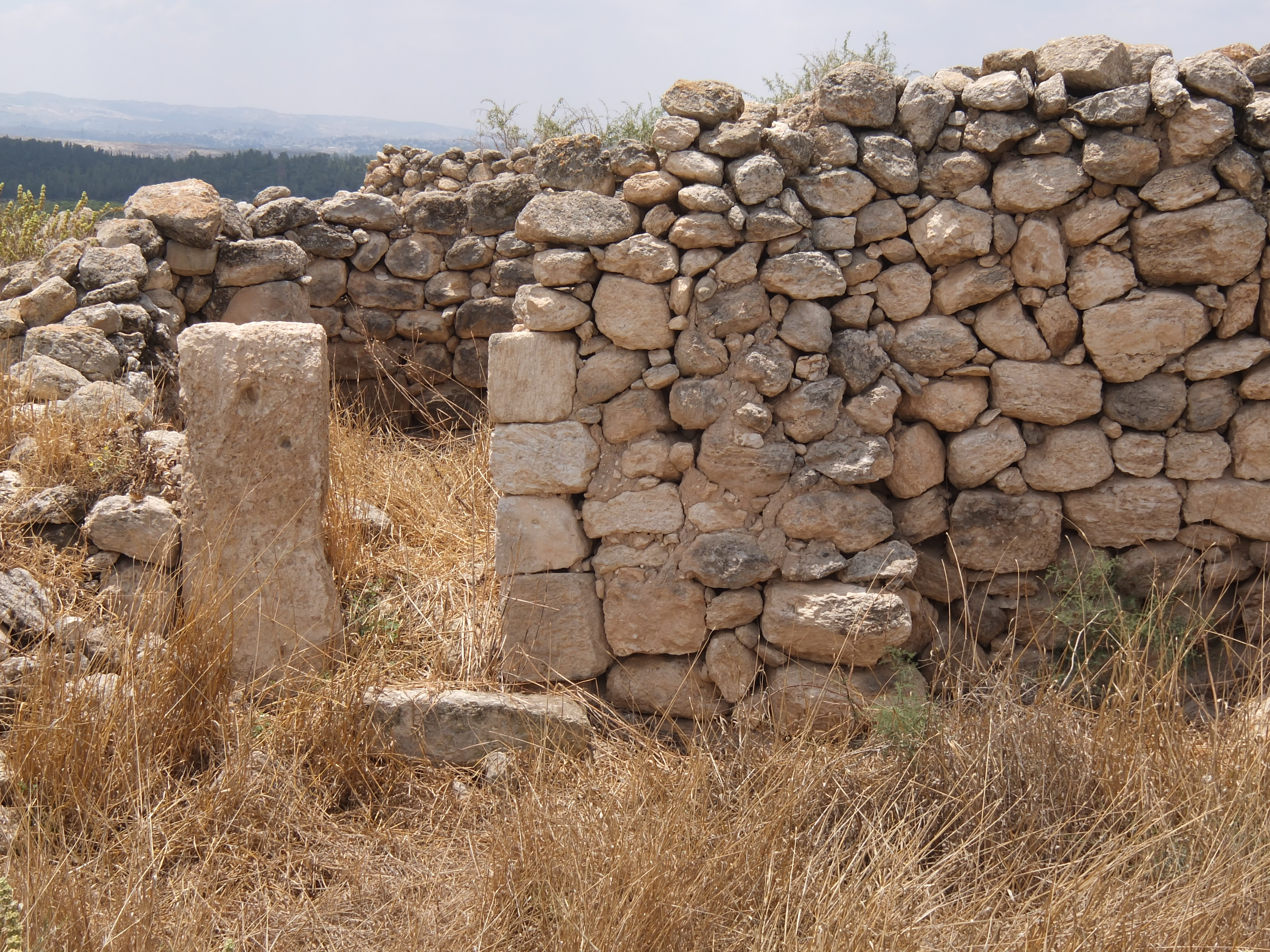
Khirbat Umm Burj

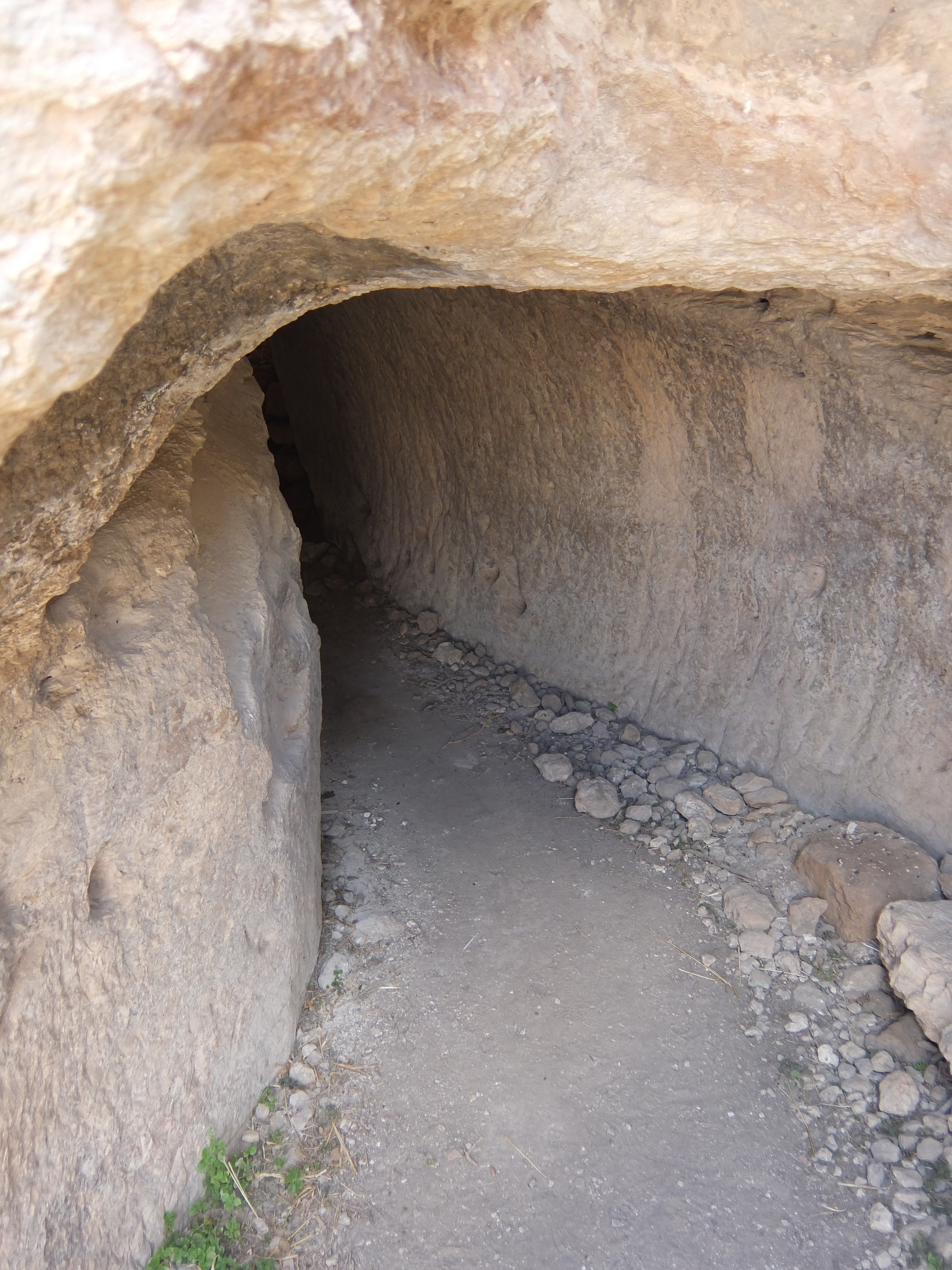
Tunnel at Hurvat Burgin (Khirbat Umm Burj)

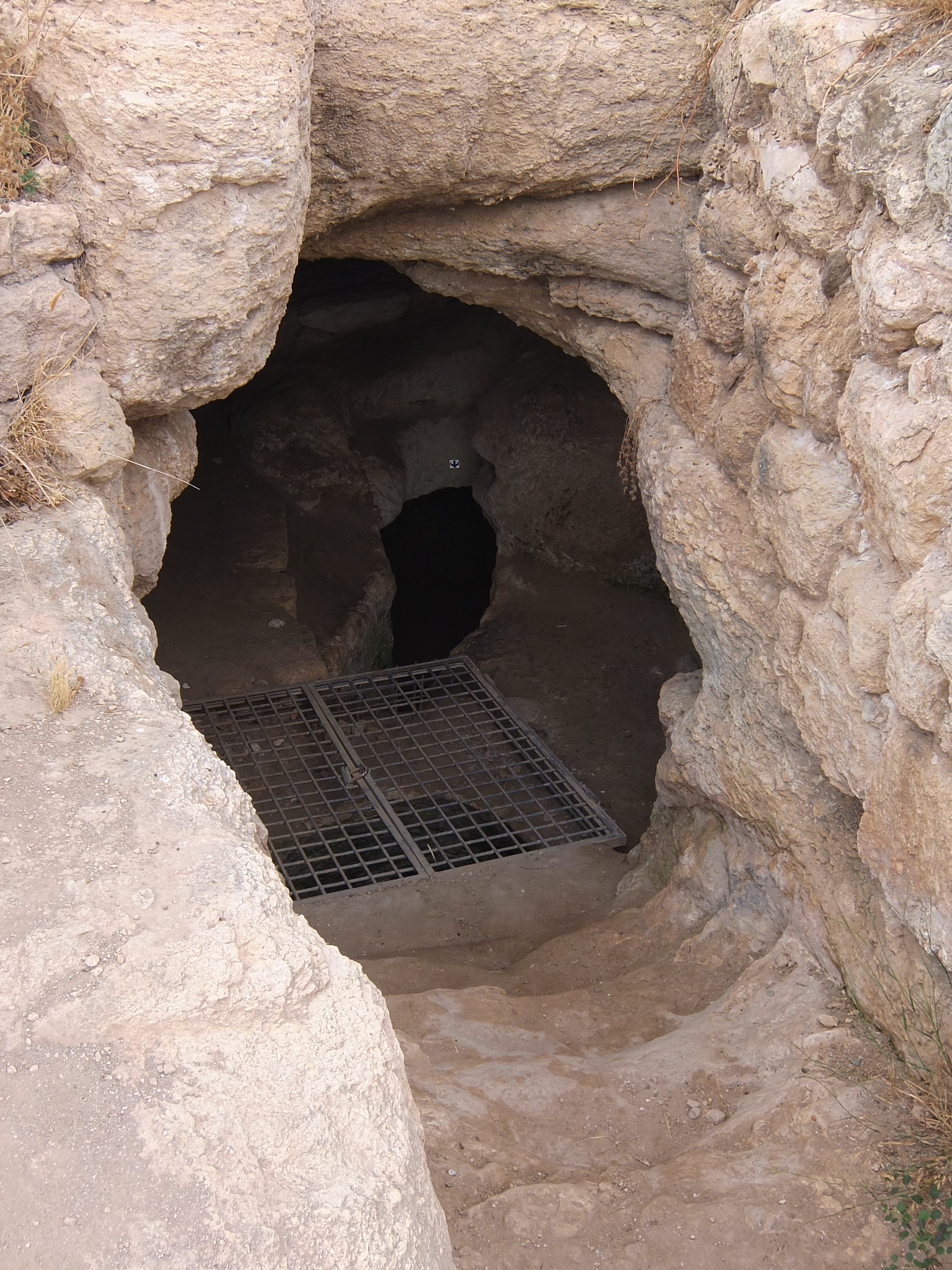
Cave and pit in Umm Burj

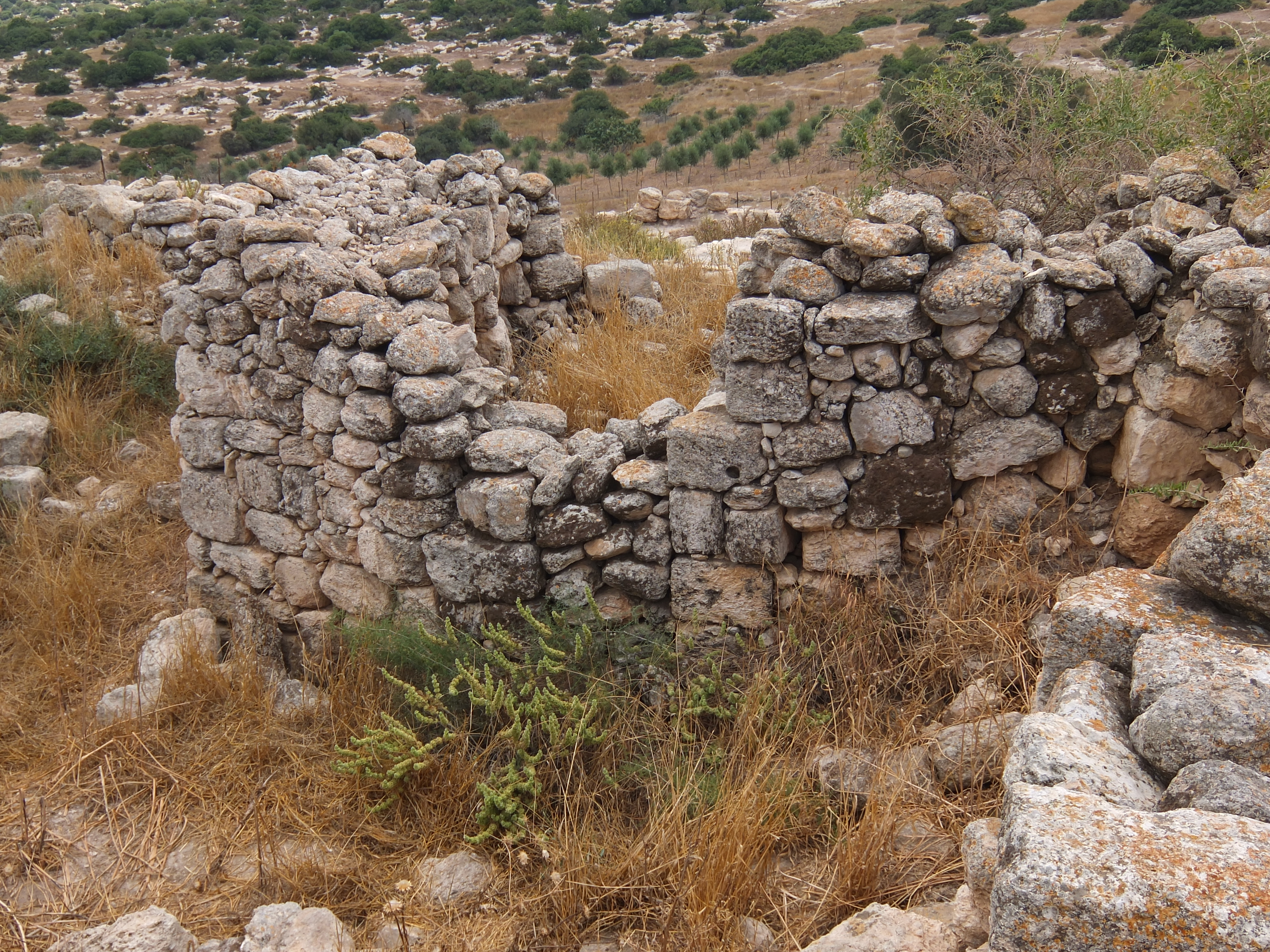
Old structure of house

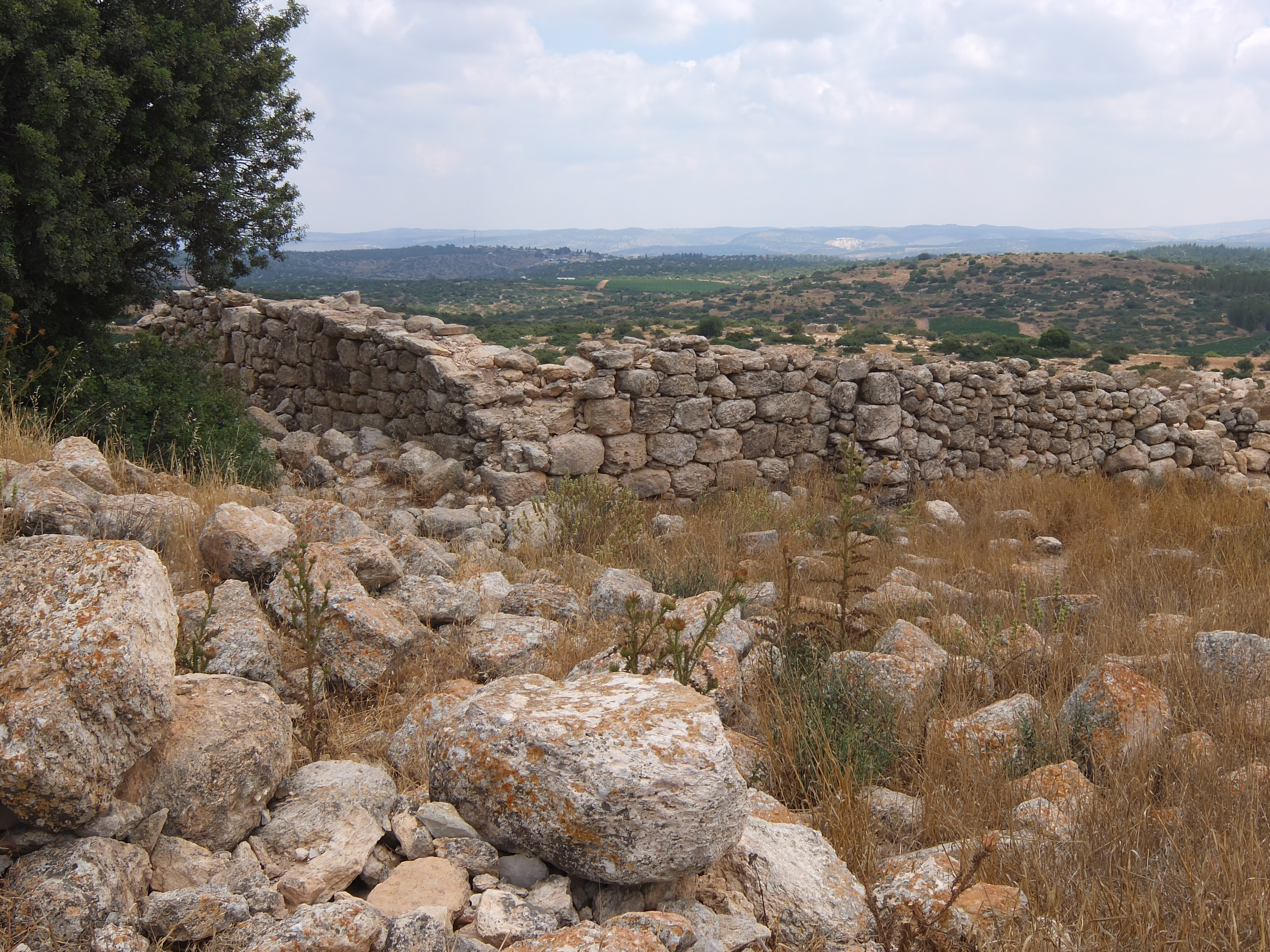
General view of remaining walls at Khirbat Umm Burj

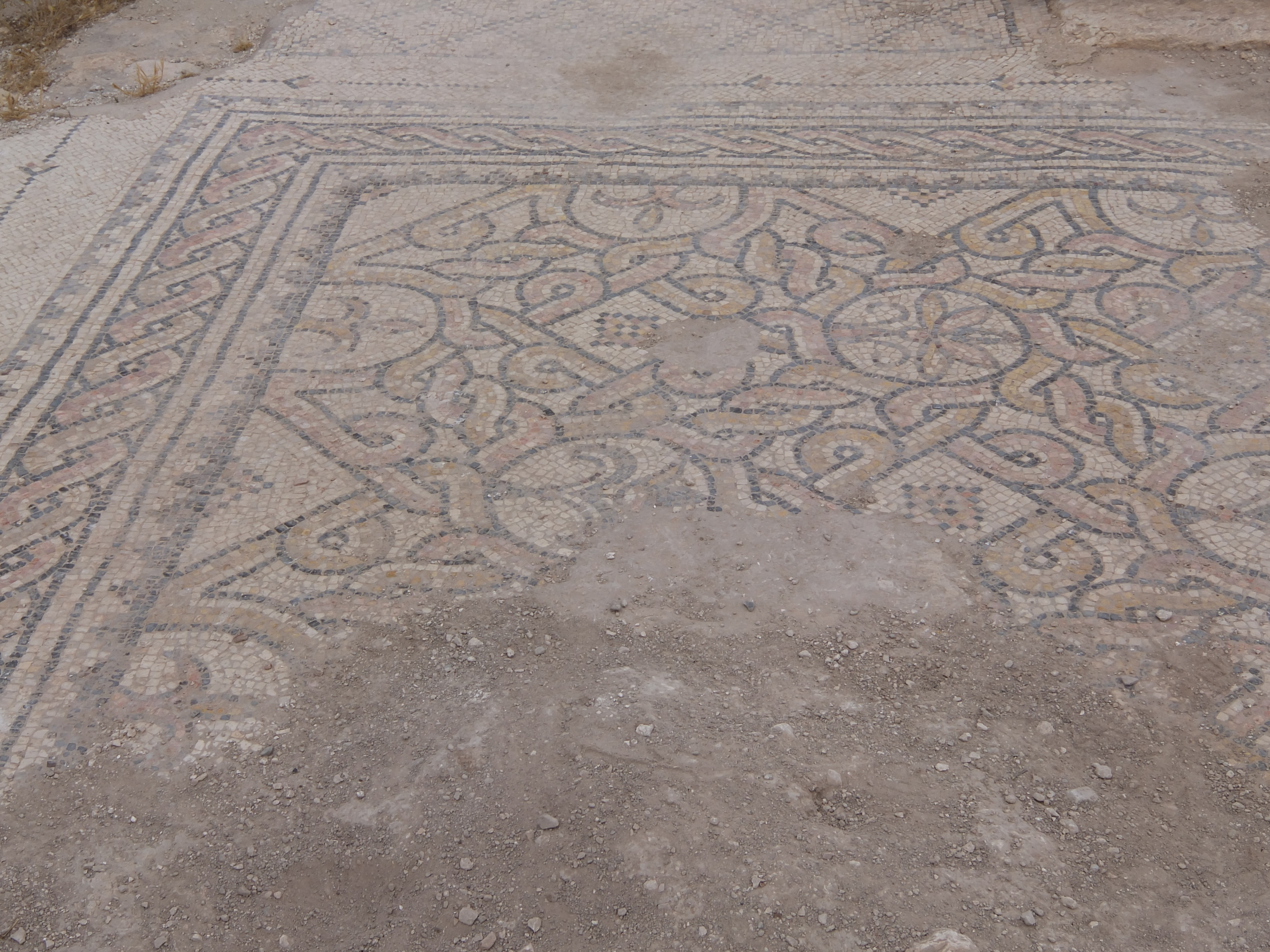
Mosaic in ruined Byzantine Church at Khirbat Umm Burj

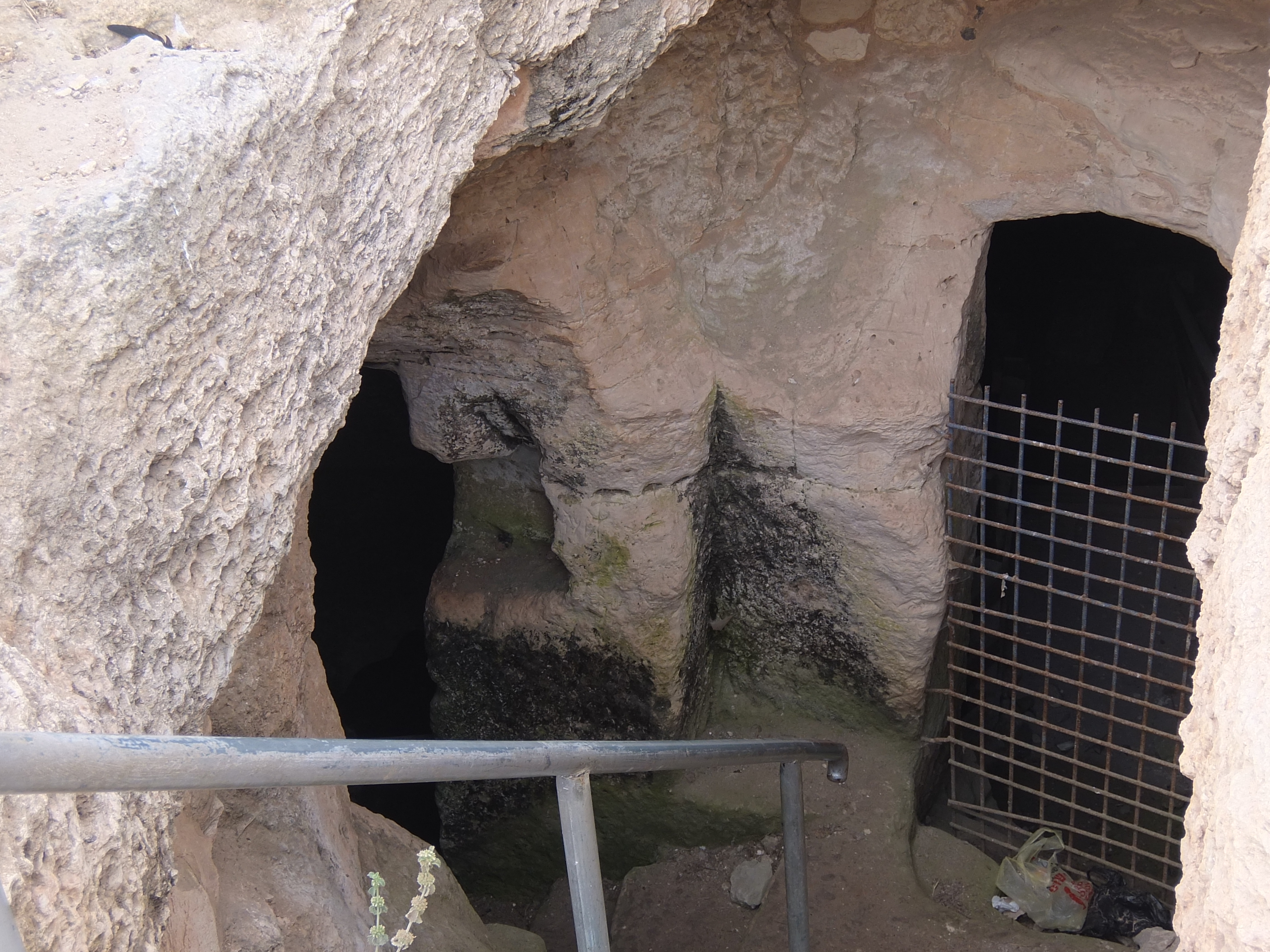
Staircase leading down to a cavern

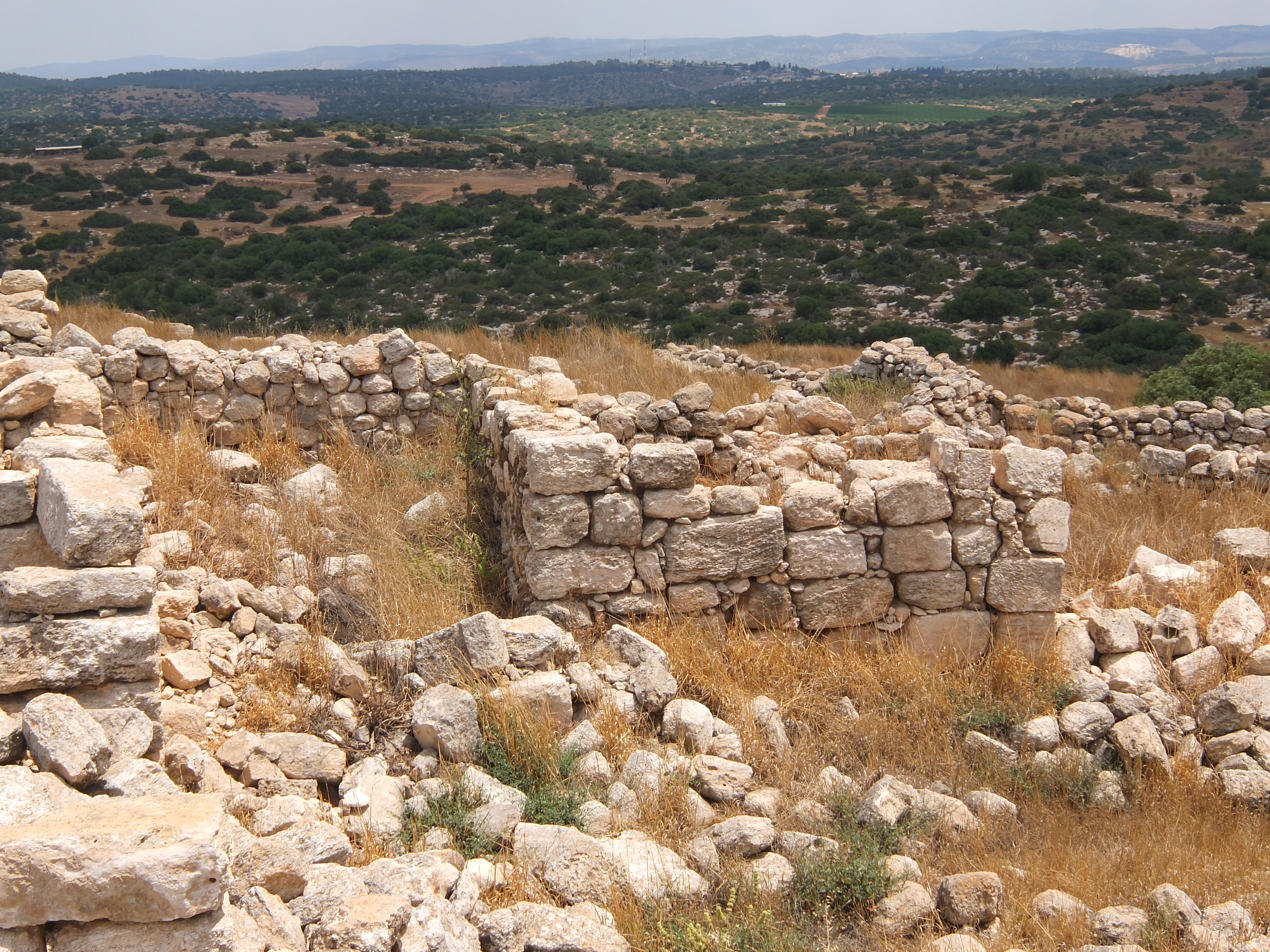
General view

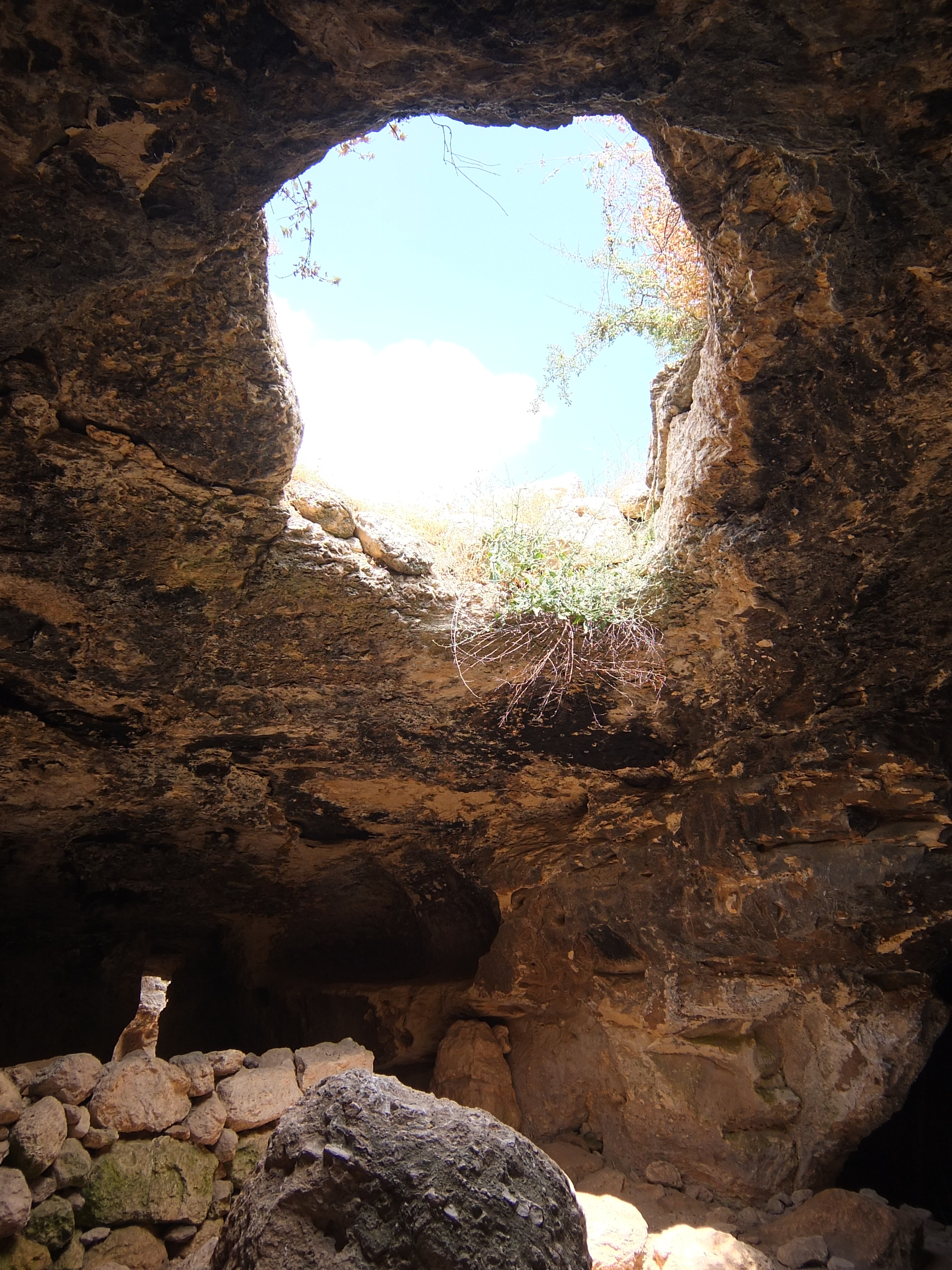
Open roof of cavern (Hurvat Burgin)

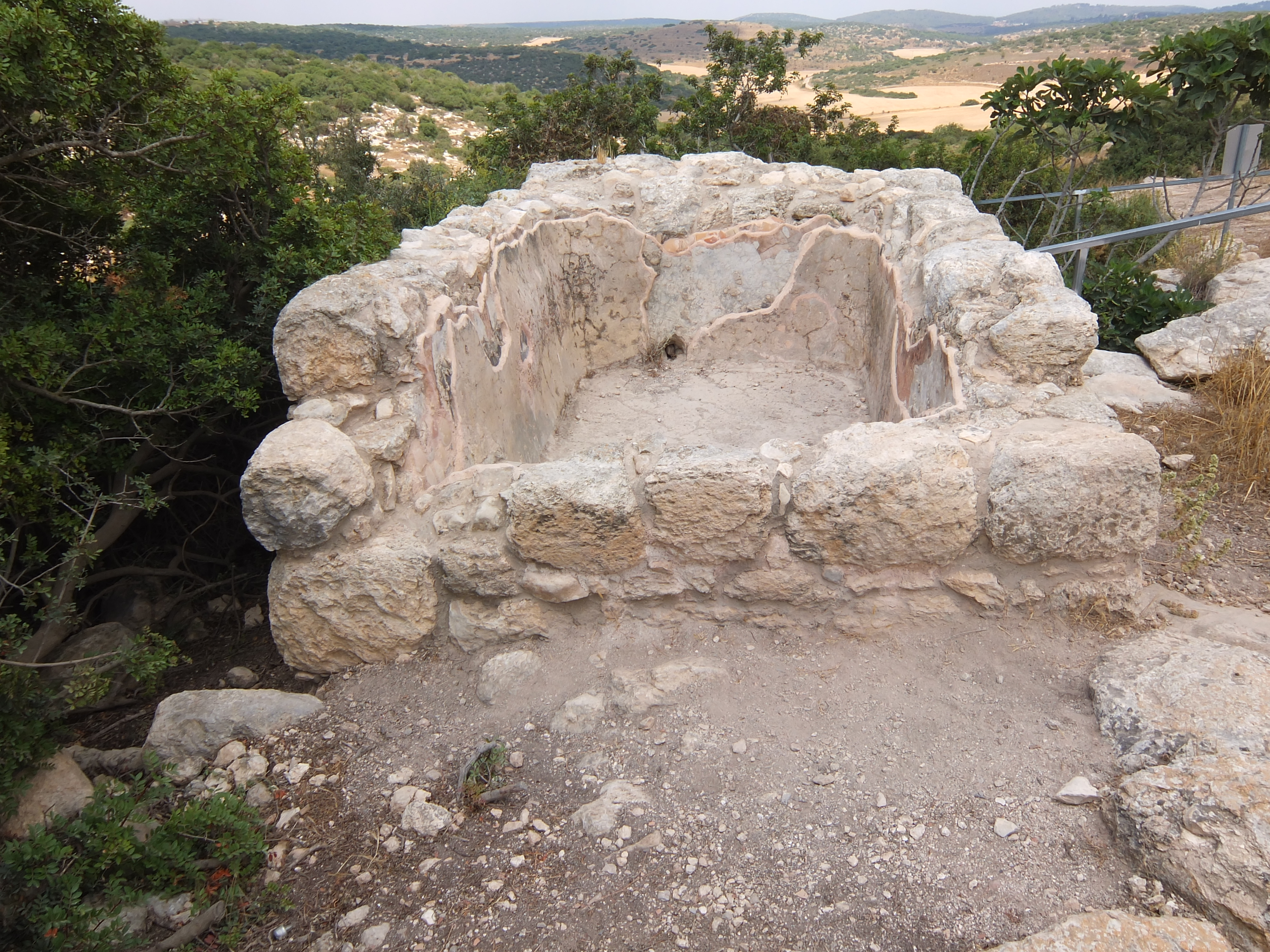
Plastered pool from Ottoman period at Khirbat Umm Burj

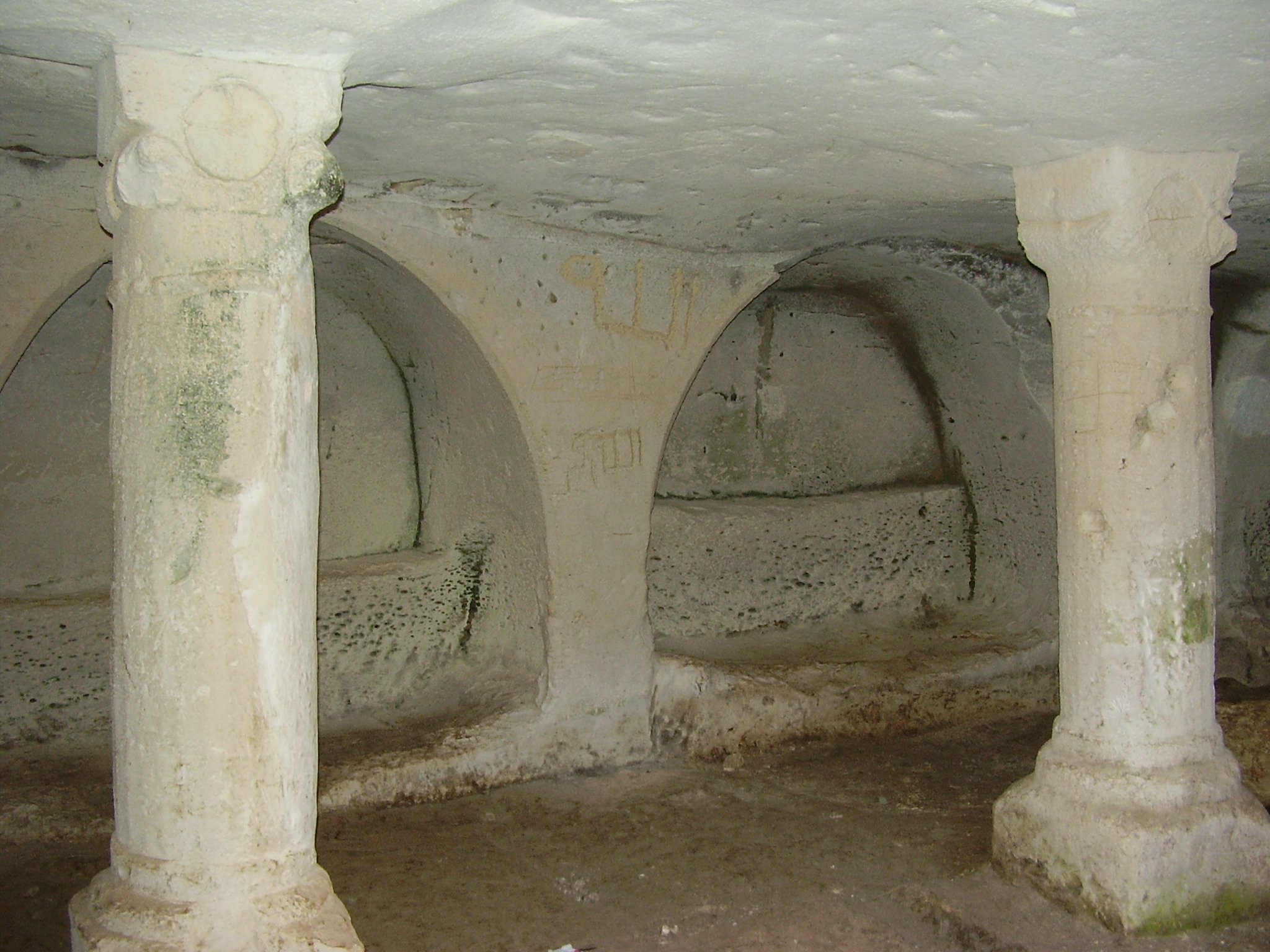
"Cave of the Column"

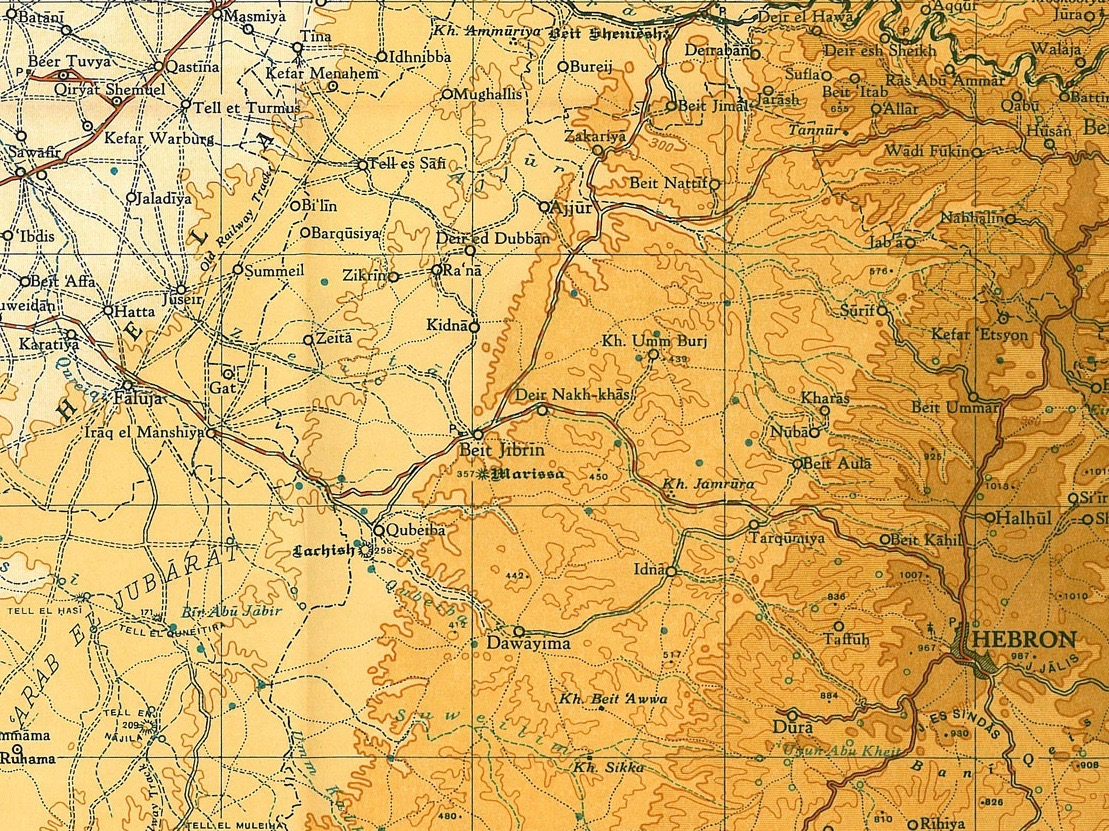
Khirbat Umm Burj 1945 1:250,000

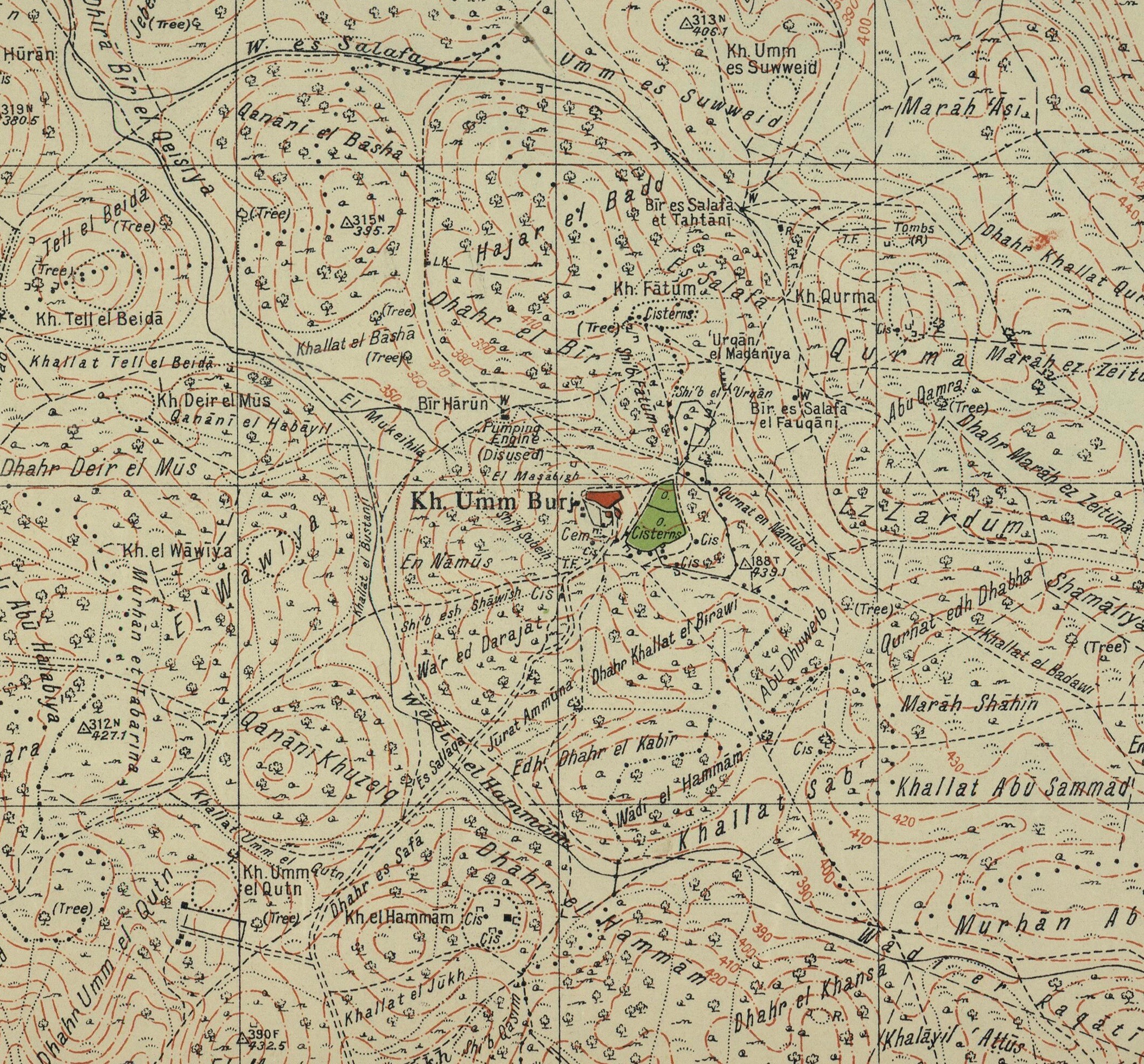
Khirbat Umm Burj 1947 1:20,000

== Bibliography ==
- Clermont-Ganneau, C.S. (1896). [ARP] Archaeological Researches in Palestine 1873-1874, translated from the French by J. McFarlane. Vol. 2. London: Palestine Exploration Fund.
- Conder, C.R.; Kitchener, H.H. (1883). The Survey of Western Palestine: Memoirs of the Topography, Orography, Hydrography, and Archaeology. Vol. 3. London: Committee of the Palestine Exploration Fund.
- Department of Statistics (1945). Village Statistics, April, 1945. Government of Palestine.
- Ganor, Amir; Klein, Alon (2011-10-11). "Horbat Burgin" (123). Hadashot Arkheologiyot – Excavations and Surveys in Israel.
- Guérin, V. (1869). Description Géographique Historique et Archéologique de la Palestine (in French). Vol. 1: Judee, pt. 3. Paris: L'Imprimerie Nationale.
- Hadawi, S. (1970). Village Statistics of 1945: A Classification of Land and Area ownership in Palestine. Palestine Liberation Organization Research Center. Archived from the original on 2018-12-08.
- Hartmann, M. (1883). "Die Ortschaftenliste des Liwa Jerusalem in dem türkischen Staatskalender für Syrien auf das Jahr 1288 der Flucht (1871)". Zeitschrift des Deutschen Palästina-Vereins. 6: 102–149.
- Khalidi, W. (1992). All That Remains: The Palestinian Villages Occupied and Depopulated by Israel in 1948. Washington D.C.: Institute for Palestine Studies. ISBN 0-88728-224-5.
- Marco, Eyal (2021-03-25). "Burgin Well" (133). Hadashot Arkheologiyot – Excavations and Surveys in Israel.
- Mills, E., ed. (1932). Census of Palestine 1931. Population of Villages, Towns and Administrative Areas. Jerusalem: Government of Palestine.
- Morris, B. (2004). The Birth of the Palestinian Refugee Problem Revisited. Cambridge University Press. ISBN 978-0-521-00967-6.
- Palmer, E.H. (1881). The Survey of Western Palestine: Arabic and English Name Lists Collected During the Survey by Lieutenants Conder and Kitchener, R. E. Transliterated and Explained by E.H. Palmer. Committee of the Palestine Exploration Fund.
- Robinson, E.; Smith, E. (1841). Biblical Researches in Palestine, Mount Sinai and Arabia Petraea: A Journal of Travels in the year 1838. Vol. 3. Boston: Crocker & Brewster.
- Rotstein, Uzi; Klein, Alon (2019-06-03). "Horbat Burgin" (131). Hadashot Arkheologiyot – Excavations and Surveys in Israel.
- Shor, Meidad (2019-07-18). "Maʻalot Burgin" (131). Hadashot Arkheologiyot – Excavations and Surveys in Israel.
- Socin, A. (1879). "Alphabetisches Verzeichniss von Ortschaften des Paschalik Jerusalem". Zeitschrift des Deutschen Palästina-Vereins. 2: 135–163.
- Warren, C.; Conder, C.R. (1884). The Survey of Western Palestine: Jerusalem. London: Committee of the Palestine Exploration Fund.
- Zissu, B. [in Hebrew]; Ganor, Amir (1997). "Horbat Burgin" (16). Hadashot Arkheologiyot – Excavations and Surveys in Israel.
- Zissu, B. [in Hebrew]; Ganor, Amir (1999). "Horbat Burgin" (19). Hadashot Arkheologiyot – Excavations and Surveys in Israel.
