= Burgan =

Burgan may refer to:

- Lake Burgan, a lake in Minnesota
- Burgan-e Bala, a village in South Khorasan Province, Iran
- Burgan-e Pain, a village in South Khorasan Province, Iran
- Burgan Field, an oil field in Kuwait
- Burgan Bank, a Kuwait-based bank
