= Clarence Burgin House =

Historic house in Massachusetts, United States

- U.S. National Register of Historic Places
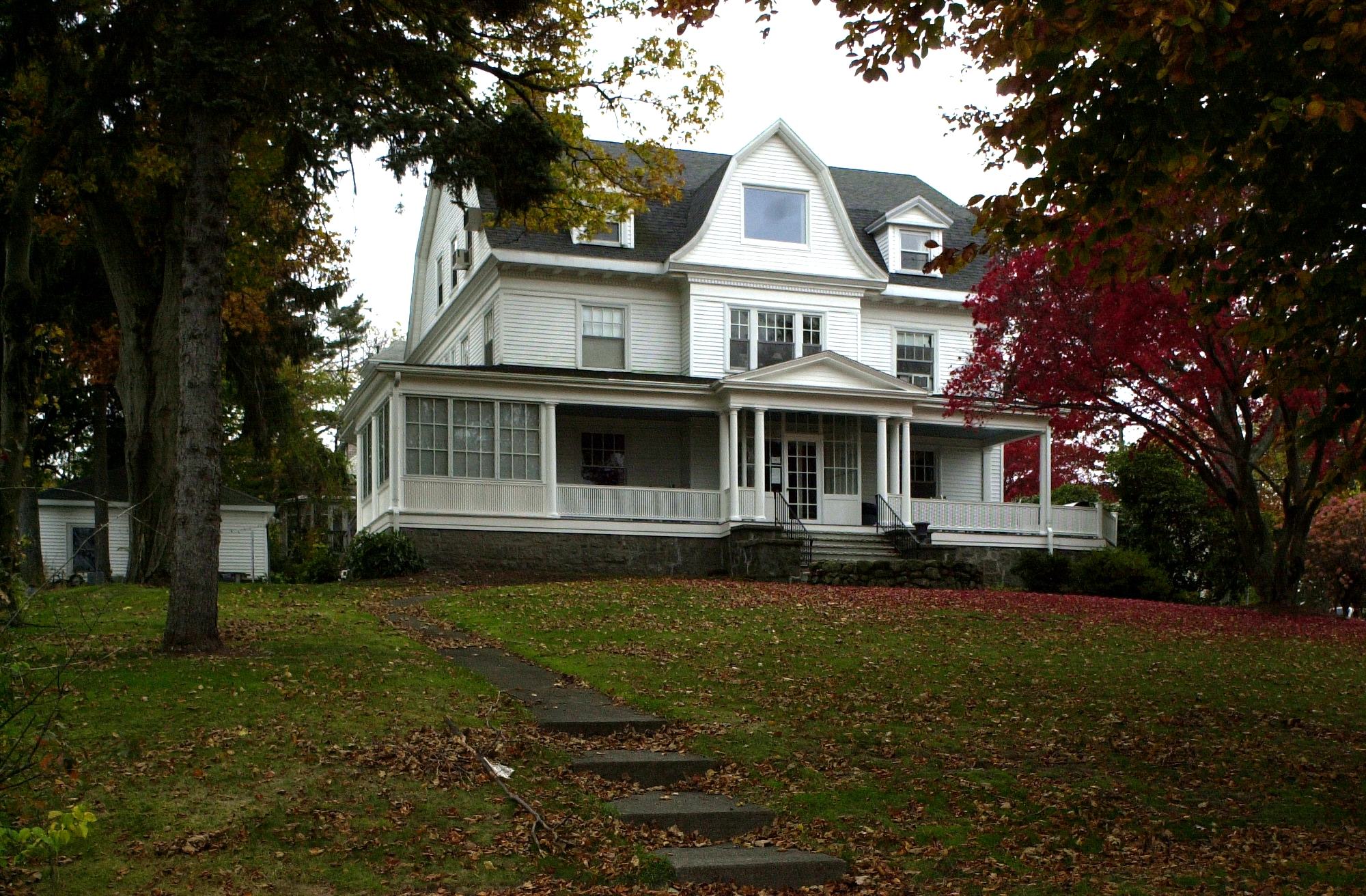

- Location within Massachusetts Location within the United States
- Location: 95 President's Ln., Quincy, Massachusetts
- Coordinates: 42°15′11″N 71°0′30″W
- Area: 0.5 acres (0.20 ha)
- Built: 1900
- Architectural style: Colonial Revival
- MPS: Quincy MRA
- NRHP reference No.: 89001364
- Added to NRHP: September 20, 1989

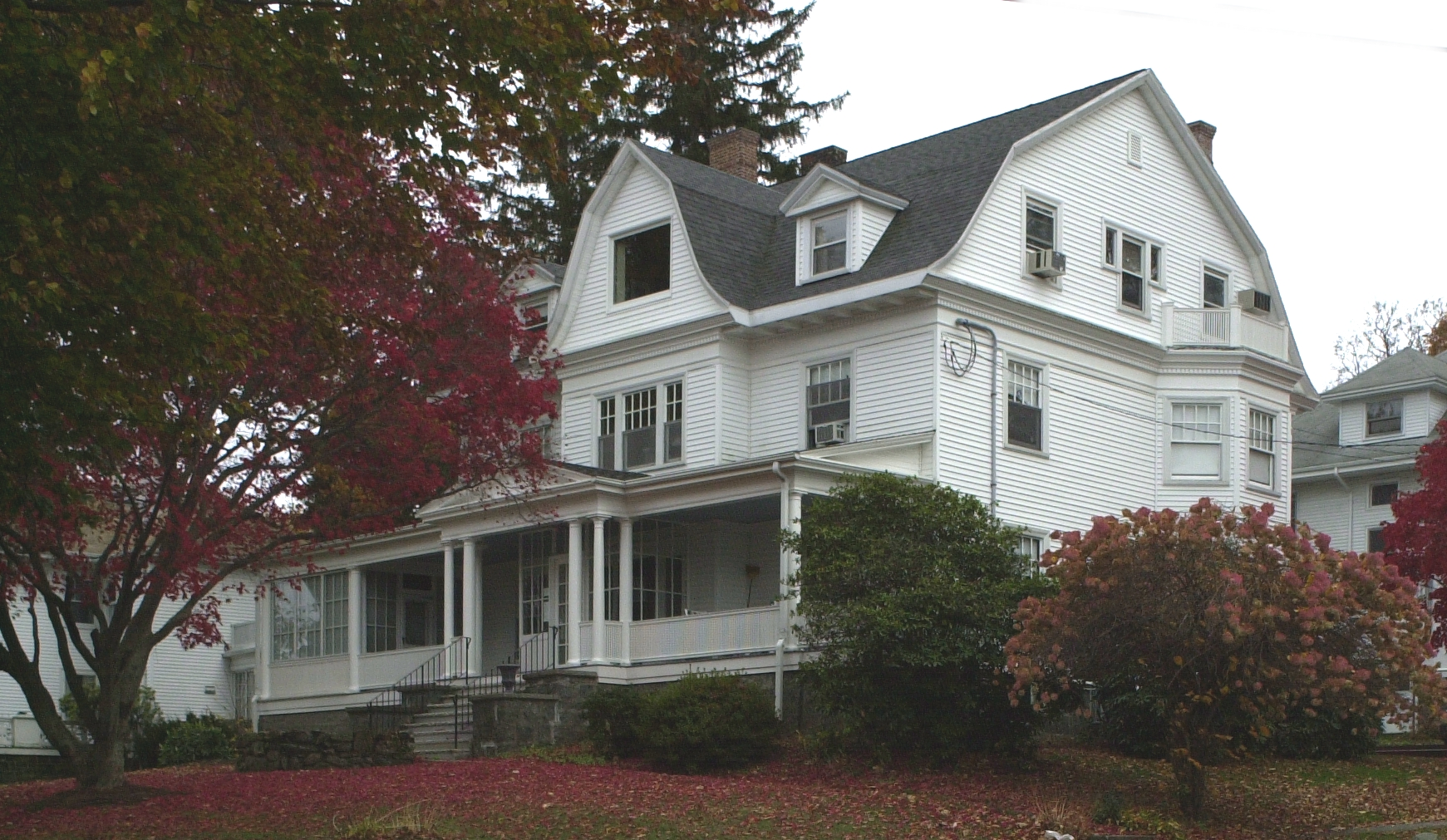

The Clarence Burgin House is a historic house at 95 President's Lane in Quincy, Massachusetts. The 2 1/2-story wood-frame house was built c. 1900 by Clarence Burgin, a bank executive and father of Quincy Mayor Thomas S. Burgin. It is one of the city's finest examples of a gambrel-roofed Colonial Revival house. Notable features include the gambrel-roof gable dormer above the main entry, and the wraparound porch with multi-columned Greek-style projection.

The house was listed on the National Register of Historic Places in 1989.

== See also ==
- National Register of Historic Places listings in Quincy, Massachusetts
