= Mebane Holoman Burgwyn =

American writer

- Born: Linda Mebane Holoman; 1914; Rich Square, North Carolina, U.S.
- Died: 1992 (aged 77–78)
- Education: Woman’s College, East Carolina University
- Occupation: Author
- Known for: Children's books
- Notable work: Penny Rose, The Crackajack Pony
- Parents: Henry Dorsey Holoman (father); Pattie Vaughn White (mother)

Mebane Holoman Burgwyn (1914–1992) was an American author of children's books.

Linda Mebane Holoman was born in Rich Square, North Carolina to daughter of Henry Dorsey Holoman (1882–1962) and Pattie Vaughn White. She graduated from Woman’s College (now The University of North Carolina at Greensboro) in 1935 with a bachelor's degree in primary education. She secured a master's degree in guidance and counseling from East Carolina University in 1961. Burgwyn lived with her family on a farm near Jackson, North Carolina, where she worked as Director of Guidance Services for Northampton County Schools.

She was the author of seven books for young people, many of them about the experiences of farm life. She received the American Association of University Women award for the best juvenile book of the year in 1952 for Penny Rose (Lippincott, 1952), and again in 1970 for The Crackajack Pony. Other books written by Burgwyn are: River Treasure (Oxford, 1947), True Love for Jenny, Hunters' Hideout (Lippincott, 1959), Lucky Mischief (Oxford, 1949), and Moonflower (Lippincott, 1954).

== Sources ==
- Mebane Holoman Burgwyn Papers at The University of North Carolina at Greensboro
