= Richard Burgin =

Polish-American violinist (1892–1981)

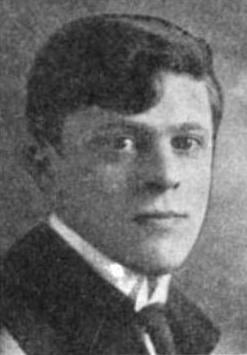
- Born: October 11, 1892; Siedlce, Poland
- Died: April 29, 1981 (aged 88); Gulfport, Florida, US
- Occupations: Violinist, conductor
- Spouse: Ruth Posselt (m. 1940)
- Children: Diana Lewis Burgin; Richard W. Burgin

Richard Burgin (October 11, 1892 – April 29, 1981) was a Polish-American violinist, best known as associate conductor and the concertmaster of the Boston Symphony Orchestra (BSO).

== Early life ==
Burgin was born in Siedlce, Poland, and first performed in public at age 11, as a soloist with the Warsaw Philharmonic Society. In 1906 he studied with Joseph Joachim in Berlin, and from 1908 to 1912 with Leopold Auer at the St. Petersburg Conservatory. Then he worked in Helsinki, Stockholm and Oslo.

== Concertmaster ==
Burgin was appointed concertmaster of the BSO in 1920 when Pierre Monteux was the principal conductor, and assistant conductor in 1927 early in Serge Koussevitzky's tenure as principal conductor (1924–1949). He conducted the BSO in 308 concerts in the United States, Australia and Japan, and was associate conductor for seven world premieres and 25 Boston premieres. He continued as concertmaster through Charles Munch's tenure as principal conductor (1949–1962), retiring in 1962 when Munch went back to Europe to conduct until his death in 1968.

Earlier, he had been concertmaster of the Leningrad Symphony, Helsinki Symphony, Oslo Philharmonic and Stockholm Concert Society. He played under renowned conductors Max Fiedler and Arthur Nikisch, and composers Richard Strauss and Jean Sibelius.

In 1957, Burgin told Time Magazine, "I know many virtuosos and I do not envy them. They tell me what it's like to play the same few pieces over and over and know they have to go here and then be there. Not for me. I like the orchestra."

As a violin soloist, he played the U.S. premiere of Sergei Prokofiev's Violin Concerto No. 1, in D major, Op. 19, on 24 April 1925, with the BSO under Serge Koussevitzky. Koussevitzky had conducted the world premiere of that masterpiece in Paris a couple of years earlier in one of his Concerts Koussevitzky, with his concertmaster Darrieux playing the solo part after the otherwise great Bronislaw Huberman had spurned it as not virtuosic enough for his taste.

From 1963 to 1968, he conducted the Naumburg Orchestral Concerts, in the Naumburg Bandshell, Central Park, in the summer series.

== Teaching and chamber music performance ==
Within a year of coming to Boston, Burgin founded his own Burgin String Quartet. He also headed the string department of the New England Conservatory, a block away from the home of the BSO, Symphony Hall, teaching both violin and conducting and, in 1953, conducting its student orchestra. Starting in 1959, he also taught at Boston University, where he lectured and conducted its chamber orchestra; and at the Berkshire Music Center, where he taught conducting. After moving to Florida following his retirement from the BSO in 1962, he taught at Florida State University in Tallahassee until his final retirement in the mid-1970s. While there, he formed the Florestan Quartet with his wife, violinist Ruth Posselt, as second violin.

== Awards ==
Burgin was a chevalier officer of the French Légion d'honneur, and a member of the American Academy of Arts and Sciences.

== Family ==
Burgin married Ruth Posselt on July 3, 1940. Their son, Richard W. Burgin, was the author of numerous short-story collections and novels. Their daughter, Diana Lewis Burgin, is an author, and Professor of Russian at the University of Massachusetts Amherst; she had published a narrative poem Richard Burgin: A Life in Verse (Slavica Pub, 1989; ISBN 0-89357-196-2) relating her father's biography.

He died in Gulfport, Florida, on April 29, 1981.

== See also ==
- Joseph Silverstein, concertmaster of the BSO from 1962 to 1984
- Malcolm Lowe, concertmaster of the BSO from 1984 to 2019
