= Diana Lewis Burgin =

American author, professor, poet

- Born: August 3, 1943 (age 83); Boston, Massachusetts, U.S.
- Occupations: Author, Professor, Poet
- Years active: 1974-present

Diana Lewis Burgin is an author, and Professor of Russian at the University of Massachusetts Boston; she received her B.A. in Russian from Swarthmore College, her M.A. & Ph.D. from Harvard University's Slavic Languages and Literatures Department. She has been teaching Russian at University of Massachusetts, Boston since 1975.

She is the daughter of Richard Burgin and Ruth Posselt, who married on July 3, 1940. She has published a narrative poem "Richard Burgin: A Life in Verse" (Slavica Pub, 1989; ISBN 0-89357-196-2) describing her father's biography.

== Works ==
- "The Fate of Modern Man: Solzhenitsyn's Cancer Ward". Soviet Studies. 26: 260–271. 1974. doi:10.1080/09668137408410947.
- "After the Ball is Over: Sofia Parnok Creative Relationship with Marina Tsvetaeva", Russia Review, Vol. 4, 1988
- "Sofia Parnok and the Writing of a Lesbian Poets Life", Slavic Review, 51/2, 1992, pp. 214–231
- Diana Lewis Burgin (July 1995). "Mother Nature Versus the Amazons: Marina Tsvetaeva and Female Same-Sex Love". Journal of the History of Sexuality. 6 (1). University of Texas Press: 62–88. JSTOR 3704438.
- Jane T. Costlow; Stephanie Sandler; Judith Vowles, eds. (1998). "Laid Out in Lavender". Sexuality and the Body in Russian Culture. Stanford University Press. pp. 177–203. ISBN 978-0-8047-3155-3.
- Katherine Bliss Eaton, ed. (2002). "Sofia Parnok and Soviet-Russian Censorship". Enemies of the people. Northwestern University Press. pp. 31–52. ISBN 978-0-8101-1769-3.

=== Poetry ===
- Burgin, Diana Lewis (1985). "The Reprieve of Nastasja: A Reading in Verse". The Slavic and East European Journal. 29 (3): 269–278. doi:10.2307/307215. JSTOR 307215.

=== Books ===
- Richard Burgin: A Life in Verse, 1989, Slavica Pub, ISBN 0-89357-196-2
- Diana Lewis Burgin (1994). Sophia Parnok. NYU Press. ISBN 978-0-8147-1221-4.

=== Translations ===
- Mikhail Afanasevich Bulgakov (August 1995). The Master & Margarita. Diana Lewis Burgin, Katherine Tiernan O'Connor. Ardis Publishers. ISBN 978-0-87501-067-0.
- Kornei Chukovskii (March 1982). Alexander Blok as Man and Poet. Diana Lewis Burgin, Katherine Tiernan O'Connor. Ardis. ISBN 978-0-88233-486-8.

=== Citations ===
- The Twentieth-century Russian Novel, David C. Gillespie, page 148
- A plot of her own, Sona Stephan Hoisington, page 144
- Pushkin and the genres of madness, Gary Rosenshield, page 209
