= Panathenaic amphora =

Special shape of attic amphoras

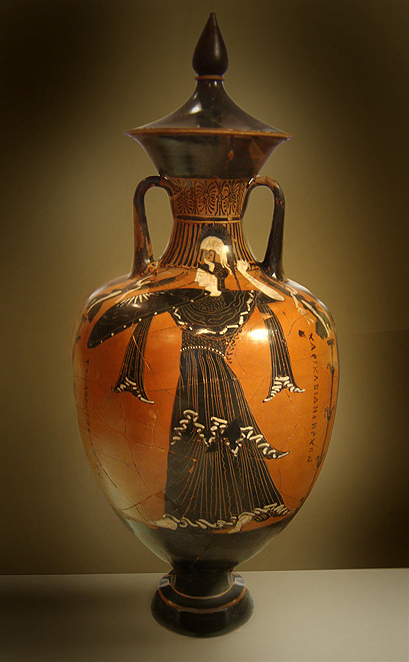
Athena on a Panathenic amphora (National Archaeological Museum of Athens)

Panathenaic amphorae were the amphorae, large ceramic vessels, that contained the olive oil given as a prize in the Panathenaic Games. Some were ten imperial gallons (12 US gal; 45 L) and 60–70 cm (24–28 in) high. This oil came from the sacred grove of Athena at Akademia. The amphorae which held it had the distinctive form of tight handles, narrow neck and feet, and they were decorated with consistent symbols, in a standard form using the black figure technique, and continued to be so, long after the black figure style had fallen out of fashion. Some Panathenaic amphorae depicted Athena Promachos, goddess of war, advancing between columns brandishing a spear and wearing the aegis, and next to her the inscription τῶν Ἀθήνηθεν ἄθλων "(one) of the prizes from Athens". On the back of the vase was a representation of the event for which it was an award. Sometimes roosters are depicted perched on top of the columns. The significance of the roosters remains a mystery. Later amphorae also had that year's archon's name written on it making finds of those vases archaeologically important.

The vases were commissioned by the state from the leading pottery workshops of the day in large numbers. Their canonical shape was set by 530 BC, but the earliest known example is the Burgon vase (British Museum, B130), which depicts Athena's owl nestling on the neck of the vase and on the reverse is a synoris team. This may mean that the vase predates the festival's reorganization in 566 since it is not an athletic event. The cock column is first seen on a panathenaic by Exekias (Karlsruhe 65.45). By the early fourth century the inclusion of the archon's name appears on these vases, the earliest almost intact one being Asteios 373/2 BC. (Oxford, 1911.257). There is a fragment that bears the name Hippodamas of 375/4 BC, however, which may also be a panathenaic, and Beazley suggests there may be a preceding one, Pythokles of 392/1.

As the century progressed, the profile of the vases became elongated and the decoration more mannered. The last known dated vase is from 312/11, although production continues into the third and second centuries, the archons are no longer named, instead, the treasurers and stewards of the games are recorded in their place.

Some vases were used as grave goods by the families of the victors, some were dedicated to sanctuaries, and still others sold, hence their wide distribution in the Greek world.

The survival rate of Greek pottery as a whole may be calculated from the remnant of panathenaic amphorae that exist. After approximately 350 BC at least 1,450 vases were awarded every four years in the greater Panathenaia. Assuming the number of events was consistent throughout the history of the games and that all prizes were in the form of decorated amphora, dividing the number of unique vases known by the total production run, gives the figure of between 0.5% and 1% of all Greek vases awarded are still extant.

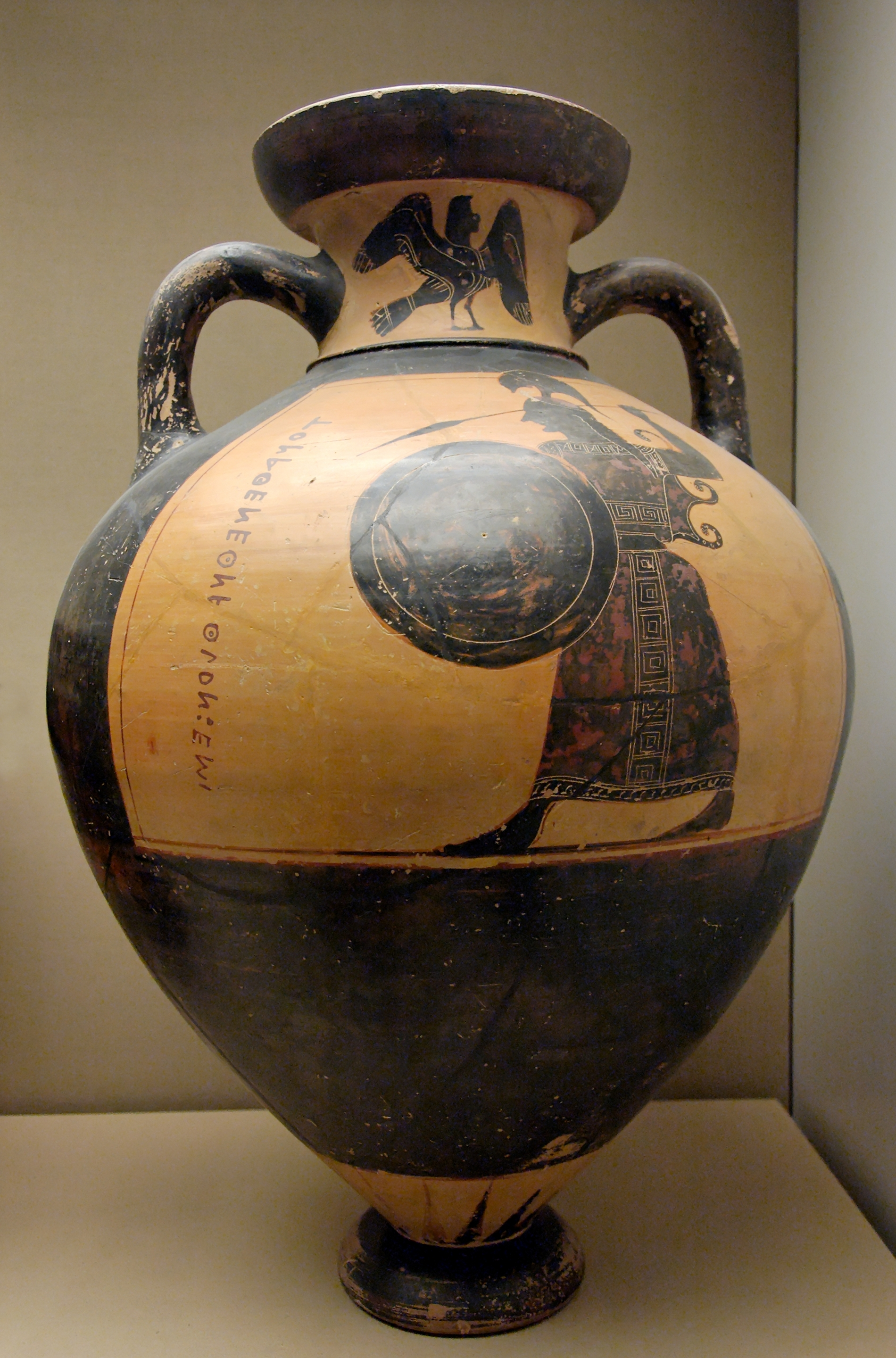
The Burgon vase ca. 565 BC, BM, London

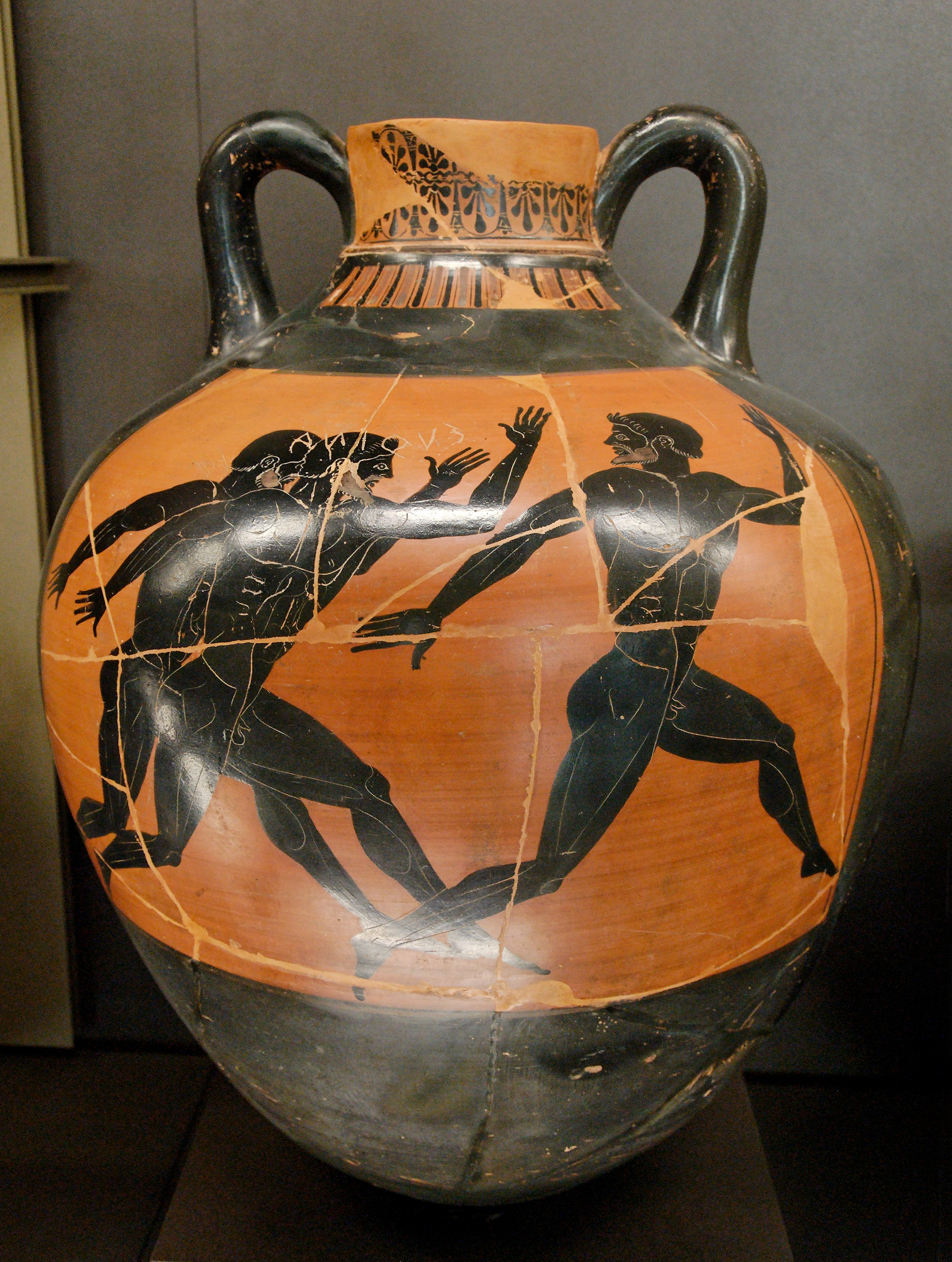
Runners (ca. 500 BC)

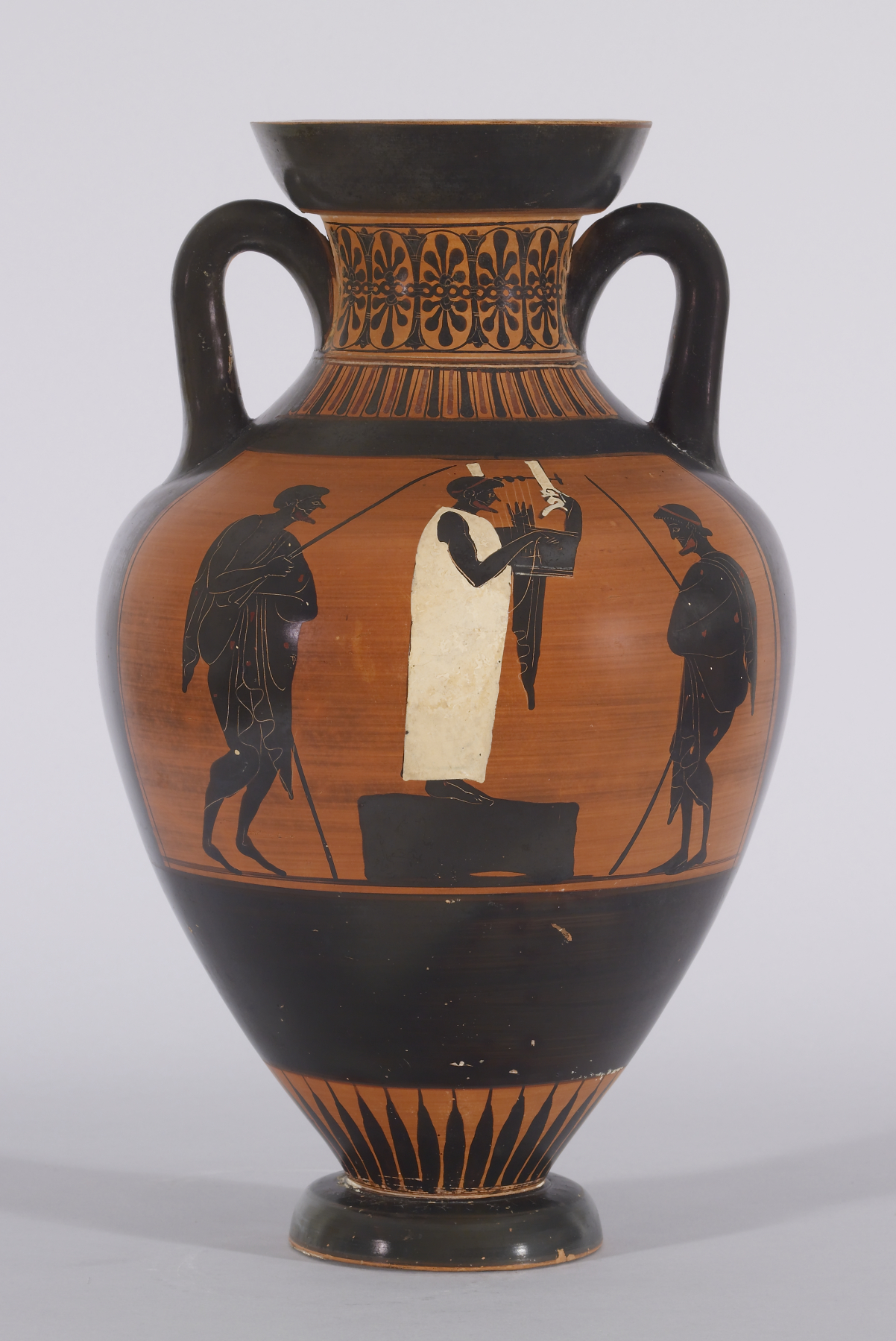
Musical competition, pseudo-Panathenaic amphora (500–485 BC)

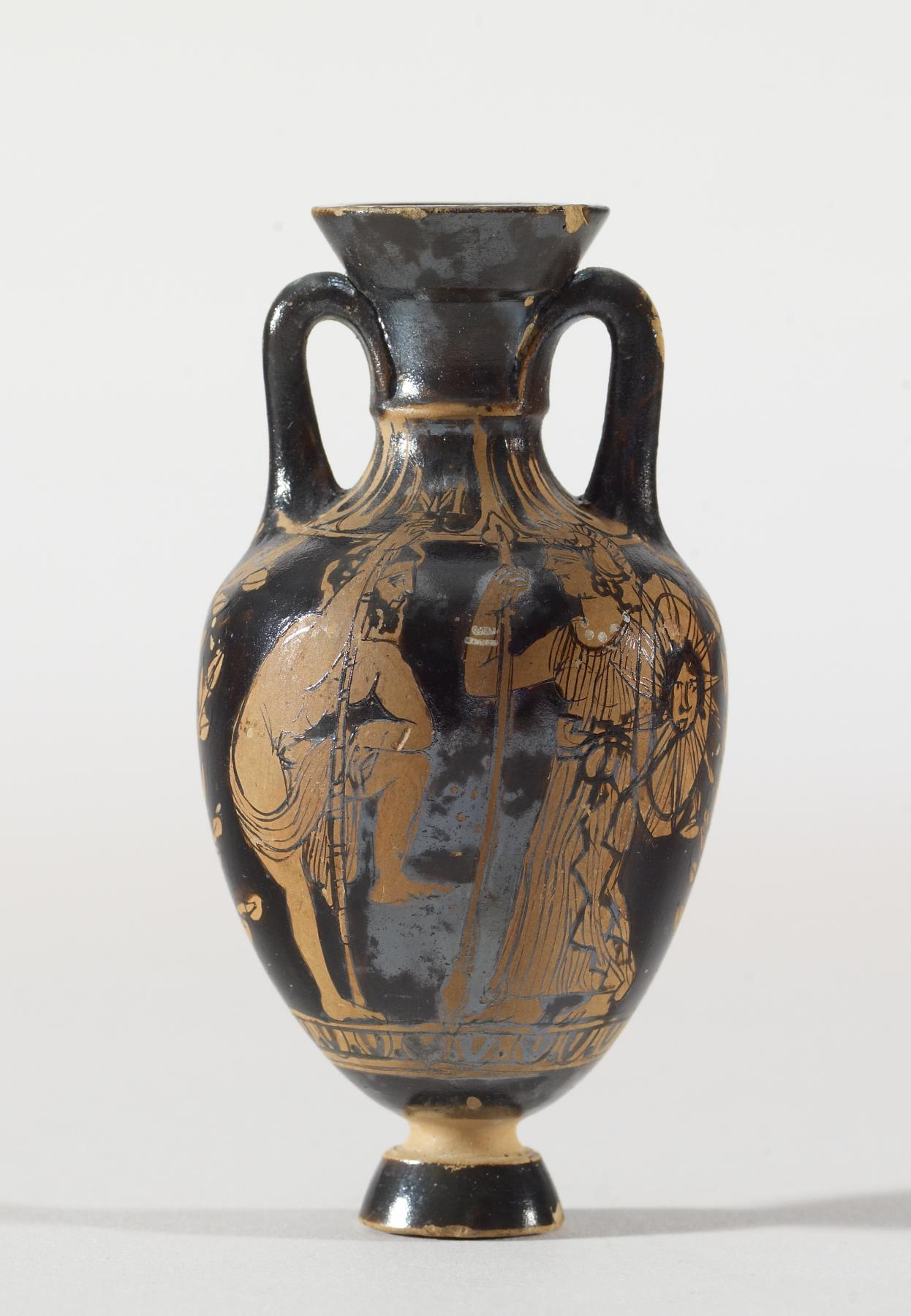
Poseidon and Athena, miniature example (early fourth century BC)

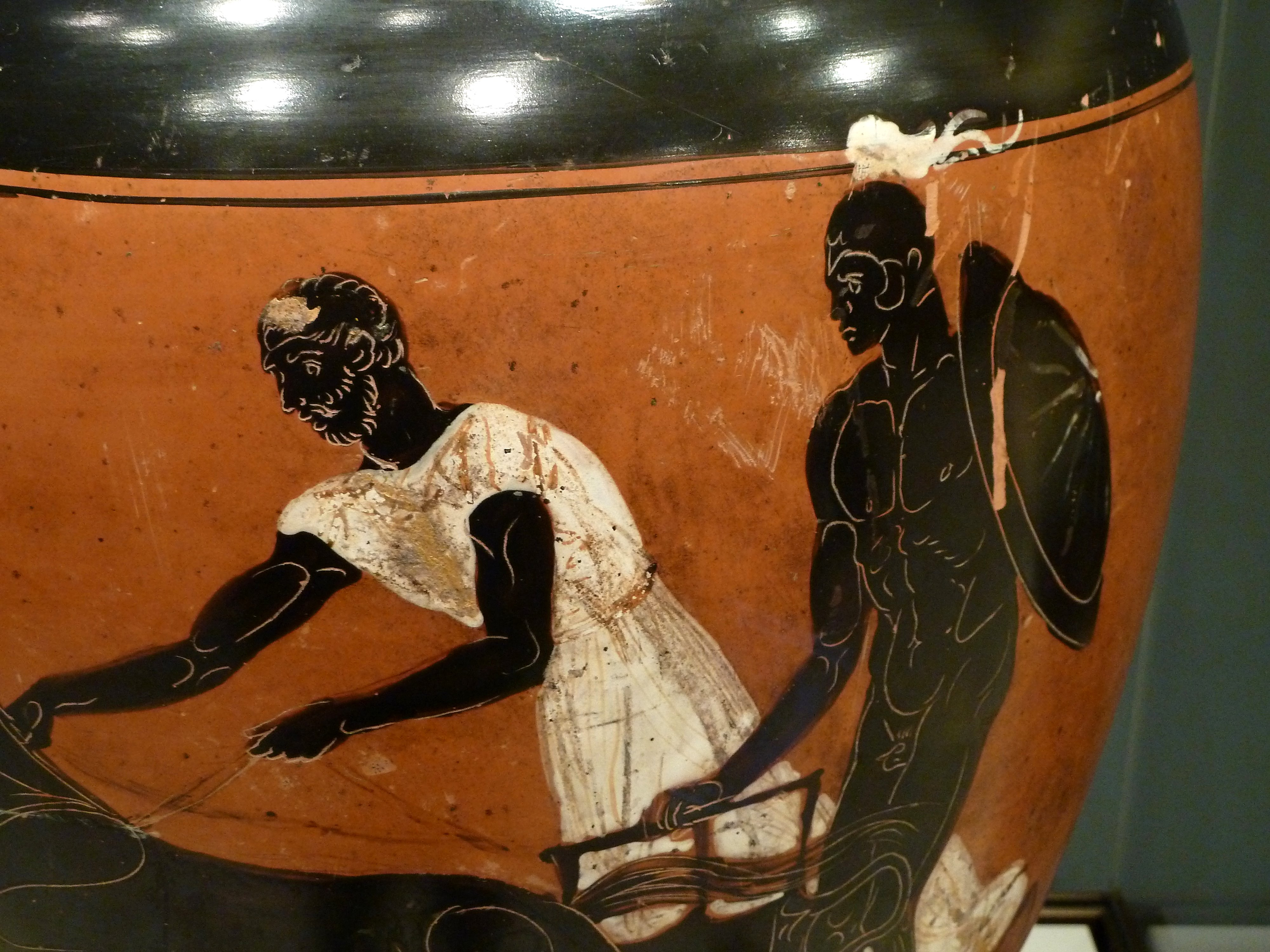
Detail of an apobates race (340–339 BC)

== Sources ==
- Boardman, John (1974). Athenian Black Figure Vases. London.
- Neils, Jenifer (1992). Goddess and Polis: The Panathenaic Festival in Ancient Athens. Hood Museum of Art and Art and Princeton University Press.
- Martin Bentz Panathenäische Preisamphoren: eine athenische Vasengattung und ihre Funktion vom 6. - 4. Jahrhundert v. Chr. Basel, Vereinigung der Freunde Antiker Kunst 1998 (Antike Kunst: Beihefte; 18) ISBN 3-909064-18-3
- Martin Bentz; Norbert Eschbach (Hrsg.): Panathenaïka : Symposion zu den Panathenäischen Preisamphoren, Rauischholzhausen 25.11. - 29.11.1998. Mainz, Zabern 2001. ISBN 3-8053-2708-0
- Sterling Adolph Callisen: The Iconography of the Cock on the Column, The Art Bulletin, Vol. 21, No. 2 (Jun., 1939), pp. 160-178
