= Lola Astanova =

Uzbek-born American pianist

Lola Astanova Лола Астанова
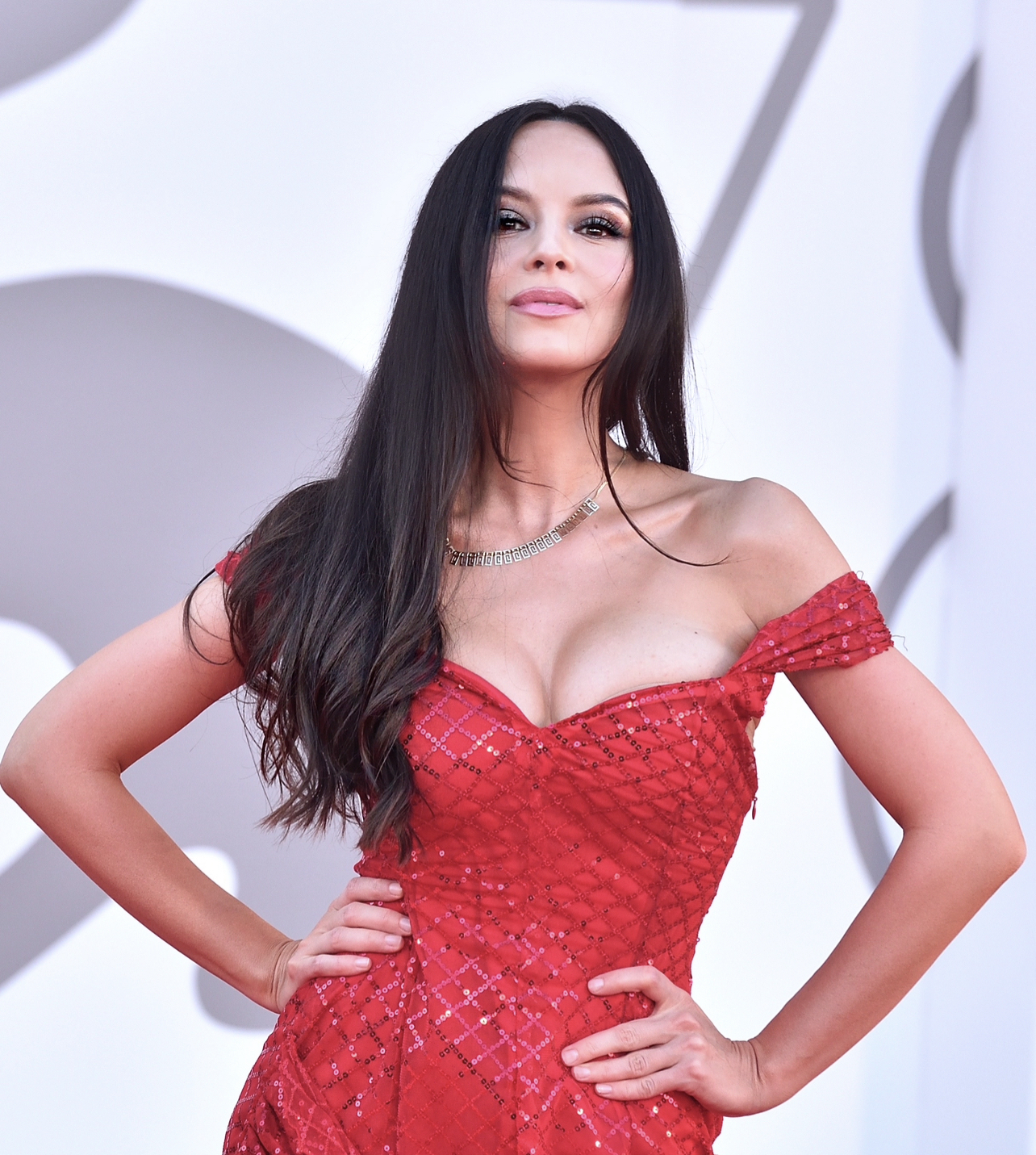
- Lola Astanova at the 78th Venice International Film Festival in 2021

Background information
- Born: Tashkent, Uzbek SSR, USSR
- Genre: Instrumental
- Occupation: Pianist
- Years active: 1994–present
- Website: lolaastanova.com

Ludmilla Astanova (Russian: Людмила Астанова), known professionally as Lola Astanova, is an Uzbek-born American pianist.

== Early life ==
Astanova was born in Tashkent, USSR. Her mother was a piano teacher and her father was a mechanical engineer. At age six, Astanova entered the V. Uspensky Specialized School of Music for Gifted Children, studying under Professor Tamara Popovich. She later studied under Lev Naumov.

Astanova began touring at the age of 8 and at 10 became a laureate of the Second Moscow International F. Chopin Competition for young pianists. At 12, she was featured in the UNESCO documentary Prodigies of the 20th Century. When she was 17, she moved to Houston, Texas, where her brother lived, and studied for her master's degree at Shepherd School of Music at Rice University.

== Career ==
Astanova was featured in the 2007 Classical Superstars Fantasy Concert hosted by ABC's television host Regis Philbin. The concert was featured in the 100th anniversary issue of the Neiman Marcus Christmas Book and offered for $1.6 million. In August 2008, the National September 11 Memorial & Museum announced Astanova's performance on the famed Steinway concert piano of Vladimir Horowitz at the "Notes of Hope" benefit hosted by Mayor Michael Bloomberg and Senator Hillary Clinton. The performance raised funds for the National September 11 Memorial & Museum in New York City.

On 19 January 2012, Astanova made her Carnegie Hall debut, with the New York Times noting that "Her taste for drama and her extreme physical abandon end up emphasizing that there isn't a great deal of emotion in her playing". Horowitz's student, American pianist Byron Janis, was among the concert's attendees. All proceeds from the performance were donated to the American Cancer Society.

In March 2012, Astanova appeared on the cover of Palm Beach Society magazine ahead of her performance with Jahja Ling at the Kravis Center.

On 30 May 2012, she performed a duet with Byron Janis during his Lifetime Achievement Award ceremony at the Lincoln Center for the Performing Arts.

Astanova's performance of Gershwin's "Rhapsody in Blue" with Gerard Schwarz and the All-Star Orchestra, was featured in the "Visions of New York" television special on PBS and received the 2016 Emmy Award for Special Event Coverage (Other than News or Sports).

In 2018, Astanova appeared in The Journey to the Theater of Silence, a documentary about her collaboration with Italian tenor Andrea Bocelli. During the same year, Astanova's collaboration with Stjepan Hauser, of the band 2Cellos, came out under the name "Lola and Hauser".
