= Vicente Chamber Orchestra =

American orchestra in Santa Monica, California

- Orchestra
- Native name: Vicente Chamber Orchestra
- Founded: 2016
- Location: Los Angeles, United States
- Concert hall: The Eli and Edythe Broad Stage
- Principal conductor: Zain Khan
- Website: vicentechamberorchestra.com

The Vicente Chamber Orchestra (VCO) is an American orchestra based in Santa Monica, founded in 2016 by conductor and violist Zain Khan. The orchestra regularly performs at concert venues in Los Angeles, including The Eli and Edythe Broad Stage in Santa Monica, and has accompanied numerous soloists, including violinist Anne Akiko Meyers, pianist Wendy Chen, violinist Michelle Kim, pianist Alessandro Deljavan, and cellists Julian Schwarz and Han Bin. The orchestra works with local art schools to showcase and support young music talent.

== History ==
The Vicente Chamber Orchestra was founded by Zain Khan in 2016, and it was named after a street close to the orchestra's rehearsal location. It was initially a group of musicians without an organizational structure or external funding, but was formed with the help of Khan's close friends who were interested in starting a new orchestra on the Westside.

The VCO gave its first performance on Saturday, November 16, 2016, featuring violinist Irina Tseitlin in a performance of Beethoven's Violin Concerto and a performance of Schubert's Symphony No. 3. Later that year, the orchestra performed at the Broad Stage in Santa Monica, featuring young pianist Noah Simon in a performance of Robert Schumann's Piano Concerto in A minor.

The orchestra often works with professional performers, including members of the Los Angeles Philharmonic, who provide support and mentoring to non-professional members.

== Seasons ==
=== 2019 – 2020 ===
In the 2019–2020 season, VCO performed three concerts:

- June 8–9, 2019: Mendelssohn: Hebrides Overture, Brahms: Double Concerto, Mozart: Symphony No. 40. Soloists: Michelle Kim (violin, New York Philharmonic) and Han Bin (cello).
- October 5, 2019: Beethoven: Triple Concerto, Symphony No. 4, Coriolan Overture. Soloists: violinist Anne Akiko Meyers, pianist Wendy Chen and cellist Julian Schwarz.
- February 22, 2020: Beethoven: Piano Concertos 1, 2, 3, 4 and 5. Soloists: Robert Thies, Tae Yeon Lim, Sung Chang, Talon Smith and Brendan White.

== Conductors ==
VCO was founded and is currently led by violist and conductor Zain Khan as its principal conductor. Before earning an MBA and launching his career in digital technology, Khan studied music in college (USC School of Music) and played viola in the American Youth Symphony under the direction of his mentor Mehli Mehta. After graduation from USC, he studied with Yehudi Menuhin while he toured with the Sinfonia Varsovia. In 2016, he set out to form his own chamber orchestra.

Ukki Sachedina has been assistant conductor since 2023.

== Artists in residence ==
Beginning 2020, the Vicente Chamber Orchestra has hosted artists in residence. The program consists of emerging music talents who are expected to perform in the Vicente Chamber Orchestra, mentor other VCO musicians and perform chamber music under the auspices of the orchestra. The Residency is allotted to a maximum of ten select musicians annually.

In 2020, the following artists in residence were named: pianist and conductor Tae Yeon Lim, cellist Ben Fried, and bassoonist Daniel Goldblum.
