= High school ice hockey in New York =

Boys' ice hockey is a popular and growing sport in the state of New York. Culturally, ice hockey is a fairly well known sport throughout the state, especially Upstate New York - due in part to its cultural connections with Canada and Southern Ontario.

High school hockey in New York is not unified under one organization, similar to states like Minnesota and New Jersey. The majority of schools participate in the New York State Public High School Athletic Association, while the remainder complete in USA Hockey-organized club leagues.

== History ==
Though high school hockey in New York can be dated back to the mid-1940s, the first league called the Northern New York Scholastic Hockey League was formed in 1948 and comprised teams from Massena, Norfolk, Potsdam and Saranac Lake. One of the League's founders, Don Spotswood, was a 1934 Clarkson College graduate who taught high school mathematics in the then Norfolk School District (today Norwood-Norfolk). Clarkson College, along with St. Lawrence University, were significant influences in the birth of high school hockey in this region.

Buffalo Explorer High School Club Hockey League was the first club hockey league in Western New York, starting in 1972. Southtowns High School Club Hockey League began in 1974 and Western New York High School Club Hockey League in 1976.

NYSPHSAA recognized high school hockey starting in 1980 with official state tournament being held. Not every section started at the same time and not every team that was sanctioned was allowed to participate in the sanctioned State tournament. Section VI (Western New York) did not allow its champion to participate until 2001. NYSAHA recognized high school hockey in 1982 but league championship were being held as early as 1972 in Buffalo. NYSAHA awarded one championship from 1982 through 2001; the association divided into two divisions in 2002 through 2009 and awarded "Large" and "Small" school championships. Since 2010, only one championship has been awarded.

In 2008-09, there was no club state championship. For the 2009-10 season, WNYHSCHL joined AAU.

== New York State Public High School Athletic Association ==
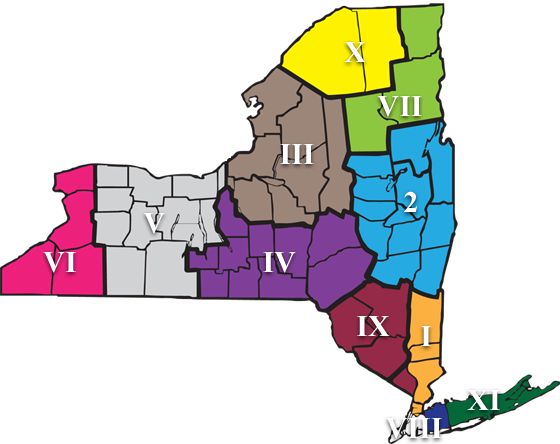
Map of NYSPHSAA sections

151 high schools field "sanctioned" varsity teams competing in the New York State Public High School Athletic Association, which competes under National Federation of State High School Associations rules.

The sanctioned teams compete from end of November through mid-March with a maximum number of practices and games. These teams are divided into two divisions, I and II, based on school enrollment (Division I being larger schools). The sanctioned Varsity teams are divided into sections used by every sport under the NYSPHSAA; Sections I, II, III, IV, V, VI, VII, IX, and X.

There are only a small handful of teams which participate from Sections IV and IX, and no teams participate from Long Island (Sections VIII and XI). The majority of high school hockey teams in these regions compete in the USA Hockey-sanctioned New York State Amateur Hockey Association club leagues.

Each section has different sets of rules for eligibility of Catholic teams to participate in the State Tournament. Sections I and VI do not allow Catholic schools to compete for the Public State Tournament; these sections determine the state title with a 1-game championship game between the downstate CHSAA (which overlaps geographically with Sections I, VIII, and XI, and NYC) and upstate Monsignor Martin (overlapping geographically with Section VI) leagues.

== NYPHSAA State tournament ==
The NYSPHSAA holds two tournaments for boys' hockey in March of each year, one each for Division I and Division II. Pre-determined state tournament brackets are utilized, with each section sending its champion along with at-large teams as necessary to fill the brackets out to 8 teams each. The tournament is single elimination, with the first round grouped regionally to minimize travel for teams prior to the Final Four. The Final Four for Divisions I, and II were played in Utica, New York's Memorial Auditorium from the tournament's inception in 1980 until 2015; since then they have been held at the LECOM Harborcenter in Buffalo, New York.

== New York State Amateur Hockey Association ==
76 club and "non-sanctioned" New York High School Hockey teams compete in New York State Amateur Hockey Association.

NYSAHA is the New York state affiliate of USA Hockey. There are four active leagues in the state, each of which follows the NYSAHA Guidebook for state-bound eligibility. The majority of the teams come from Long Island, Broome County, Hudson Valley, and Western New York. The non-sanctioned Club teams are divided into sections used by all amateur hockey teams under the NYSAHA umbrella. Due to USA Hockey regulations, Club teams are not permitted to play against teams under the NYSPHSAA umbrella as those teams are not registered with USA Hockey.

NYSAHA has set guidelines on the state bound teams and, depending on the number of teams from each section that are state-bound, determine how many teams from each section will attend the three-day state tournament. Typically two teams, the regular season champion and playoff champion, from each league will be invited to the state tournament, although this has not necessarily been the case each year.

Location	League	No. of Varsity Teams	Analogous NYSPHSAA Section
Nassau County	NYIHSHL	17	Section VIII
Suffolk County	SCHSHL	10	Section XI
Hudson Valley	HVHSISA	5	Section IX
Broome County	BCHSHA	6	Section IV

Eight teams participate in three-day state tournament to determine the State champion. The tournament begins with a group stage where all teams play 3 games each; the top two teams from each group move onto the semifinals and the winners of those two games move on to the finals, all of which are one-game elimination. The champion moves on to play in the USA Hockey National Championship tournament typically at the end of March.

The non-sanctioned teams have no official start and stop date and no limit on the minimum and maximum of games. NYSAHA club teams retain their "club" label, though many are branded as high school hockey similar to a traditional varsity team. Due to this, the skill level varies from club to club despite all being "high school hockey". NYSAHA clubs vary a lot, with some being more advanced or higher level, while others are played more on the basis of having fun or winning a local championship instead of a state championship.

== Historical timeline ==
- 1947 - Norfolk High School fields their first team (today, Norwood-Norfolk)
- 1968 - Monroe County High School Hockey League formed with six teams (Aquinas, Brighton, Fairport, Irondequoit, McQuaid Jesuit, Monroe)
- 1969 - Town of Oyster Bay High School Club Hockey League forms
- 1972 - Buffalo Explorer High School Club Hockey League forms
- 1973 - New York Islanders High School Club Hockey League forms
- 1974 - Southtowns High School Club Hockey League forms
- 1976 - Western New York High School Club Hockey League forms
- 1980 - New York State Public High School Athletic Association crowns its first champion
- 1982 - New York State Amateur Hockey Association crowns its first champion
- 1990 - Section VI recognizes hockey as official sport
- 2001 - Section VI sends its champion to state tournament
- 2002 - NYSAHA crowns two champions - Large and Small School

== NYSPHSAA Boys' Teams (former teams = No Longer Exists/Merged) ==
School	Nickname	Colors	Est.	Section	Division	NYSPHSAA Championships
Adirondack	Rivermen	Blue, Black	2013	II	One	
Albion (NLE)			1994	V	Two	
Alexandria Bay (NLE/Merged)	Purple Ghosts	Purple, White	1948	X	Two	
Amherst	Tigers	Orange, Black	1990	VI	Two	
Aquinas	Irish	Maroon, White	1968	V	One	1998, 1999^
Auburn	Maroons	Maroon, White		III	Two	
Baldwinsville	Bees	Red, White		III	One	
Batavia (NLE/Merged)			1979	V	Two	
Batavia / Notre Dame	Blue Devils	Blue, White		V	Two	
Beekmantown/Chazy	Eagles	Red, Gray	1989	VII	Two	
Bethlehem	Eagles	Orange, Black		II	One	
Bishop Cunningham (NLE)	Bishops	Red, White		III	Two	
Bishop Kearney		Light Blue, White	1970	V	Two	
Bishop Timon/Saint Jude	Tigers	Green, Gold		VI	Private	
Brighton	Barons	Navy, White	1968	V	One	
Brockport (Merged)	Blue Devils	Blue, White	1984	V	One	2003
Bronxville (NLE/Merged)	Broncos	Blue, Gray		I	Two	
Burke Catholic (NLE/Merged)	Eagles	Navy, White		IX	Two	
Burnt Hills/ Scotia	Spartans	Maroon, White		II	One	
BYSNS	Bison	Black, Silver, White, Red		I	One	
Byram Hills	Bobcats	Scarlet, Navy		I	Two	
Canandaigua	Grey Wolves	Red, Gray, White	1997	V	Two	
Canisius	Crusaders	Blue, Gold		VI	Private	
Capital District	Jets	Navy, Royal, Gray		II	One	
Canton	Golden Bears	Gold, Brown	1954	X	One	1993, 1994, 1997, 1998
Cardinal Mooney (NLE)	Cardinals		1986	V	Two	
Carmel	Rams	Red, White, Blue	2001	I	Two	
Cazenovia	Lakers	Royal Blue, Gold		III	One	2011
Central Square (NLE / Merged)	Redhawks	Maroon, White		III	Two	
CBA Albany	Brothers	Purple, Gold		II	Two	
CBA Syracuse / Jamesville-Dewitt	Brothers	Purple, Gold		III	Two	2013
Churchville-Chili	Saints	Orange, White	1997	V	Two	
Cicero-North Syracuse	North Stars	Kelly Green, Royal Blue		III	One	
Clarence	Red Devils	Red, Black		VI	One	
Clarkstown		Black, Gold		I	One	
Clinton	Comets	Maroon, White		III	Two	1995, 1996, 2005, 2006
CNY Fusion	(none)	Red, Navy Blue	2023	III	One	
Corcoran (NLE / Merged)	Cougars	Maroon, White		III	One	
Cortland-Homer	Golden Eagles	Royal Blue, Gold		III	Two	
Cortlandt	Rebels			I	One	
East Ramapo (NLE/Merged)	Titans	Black, Gold, White		I	Two	
Eastchester/Tuckahoe/Bronxville	Eagles	Blue, Red		I	Two	
Eastridge (NLE - Folded 1979)			1971	V		
Fairport	Red Raiders	Red, White	1968	V	One	
Fayetteville-Manlius	Hornets	Hunter Green, White		III	One	
Fox Lane	Foxes	Red, White		I	One	
Franklin Academy (Malone)	Huskies	Green, White	1978	X	Two	
Frontier	Falcons	Royal, White	2001	VI	One	
Fulton (NLE / Merged)	Red Dragons	Red, Green		III	One	
Gates-Chili	Spartans	Blue, White	1980	V	One	1999, 2005
Geneseo/Livonia	Lakers	Blue, White	1984	V	Two	
Geneva	Panthers	Black, Gold		V	One	
Glens Falls (NLE/Merged)	Indians	Red, Black	1985	II	Two	1990, 1991
GMSVS	Storm	Black, Blue		II	One	
Grand Island	Vikings	Blue and White	1974	VI	Two	
Greece Arcadia/Olympia	Lightning	Black, Silver	1986	V	One	1996*
Greece Athena/Odyssey	Thunder	Purple, Gold	1986	V	One	2009
Hamburg	Bulldogs	Purple, White	2008	VI	Two	
Hamilton (NLE / Merged)	Emerald Knights	Kelly Green, White		III	Two	
Hilton	Cadets	Red, Black	1988	V	One	
Horace Greeley	Quakers	Royal, Orange		I	Two	
Indian River (NLE/Merged)	Warriors	Columbia, Navy, White	1988	X	Two	
Irondequoit	Eagles	Gold, Blue	1968	V	One	
Ithaca	Little Red	Crimson, Gold		IV	One	1984, 1987, 1994, 2000, 2007
James I. O'Neill (NLE/Merged)	Raiders	Maroon, White		IX	Two	
John Jay	Wolves	Purple, White		I	Two	
Kenmore East	Bulldogs	Navy, Gold	2001	VI	Two	2012, 2016
Kenmore West	Blue Devils	Blue, White	2001	VI	Two	
Lake Placid	Blue Bombers	Blue, Gold		VII	Two	1980
Lancaster	Legends	Red, Black	2004	VI	One	
LaSalle Senior High School	Explorers		2000	VI		
LaSalle Institute	Cadets	Blue, Black		II	One	2000
Lewiston-Porter	Lancers	Green, Black	2009	VI	Two	
Liverpool (NLE / Merged)	Legends	Navy Blue, Orange		III	One	1985
Mahopac	Indians	Blue, Gold		I	One	
Mamaroneck	Tigers	White, Black, Orange		I	One	2016
Massena	Red Raiders	Red, Blue, White	1937	X	One	1981, 1982, 1993, 1995, 2008, 2014
McQuaid Jesuit	Knights	Black, Gold	1968	V	One	2005, 2015
Monroe Woodbury	Crusaders	Purple, Black, White		IX	One	2007
Mohawks		Red, White Blue		II	One	
Mohawk Valley	Jugglers	Navy Blue, Gold		III	One	
Monroe (NLE 1969)			1968	V	§	
New Hartford	Spartans	Red, White, Royal Blue		III	Two	1997, 2009, 2010
New Rochelle	Huguenots	Purple, White		I	One	
Newburgh Free Academy	Goldbacks	Blue, Gold		IX	One	
Niagara Falls/Lockport	Wolverines/Lions	Navy, Gold	2007	VI	One	
Niagara Wheatfield	Falcons	Red, Black	2008	VI	One	
Nichols School	Vikings	Green, White	1919	VI	Private	
North Rockland	Red Raiders	Red, White		I	One	
North Tonawanda	Lumberjacks	Navy, Red	2009	VI	One	
Northeastern Clinton	Cougars	Maroon, White		VII	Two	
Norwood-Norfolk	Flyers	Green, Gold	1947	X	Two	
Nyack	Indians	Red, Black		I	Two	
Ogdensburg	Blue Devils	Blue, White	1941	X	Two	
Ontario Bay	Storm	Black, Gold, Red		III	One	
Orchard Park	Quakers	Maroon, White	2006	VI	One	
Oswego	Buccaneers	Royal Blue, White		III	Two	
Pawling	Tigers	Black, Orange		I	Two	
Pearl River	Pirates	Royal, White		I	Two	
Pelham	Pelicans	Navy, Gold		I	Two	2017, 2022
Penfield	Patriots	Red, White		V	One	
Pittsford	Panthers	Blue, White	1969*	V	One	
Plattsburgh	Hornets	Orange, Black		VII	Two	
Pleasantville/Westlake/Kennedy	Ice Cats			I	Two	
Portside (Combined Brockport and Spencerport)	Royals	Blue, Gold	2022	V	Two	
Potsdam	Sandstoners	Blue, Orange	1941	X	One	
Queensbury	Spartans	Blue, Gold		II	Two	
Rivertown	Legends	Green, Black, Red		I	One	
Rome Catholic (NLE)	Red Wings	Red, White		III	Two	1984, 1985
Rome Free Academy	Black Knights	Orange, Black		III	One	1986, 1988
Rush-Henrietta	Comets	Green, Gold	1970	V	One	
Rye	Garnets	Garnet, Black, White		I	Two	2026
Rye Town/Harrison	Titans	Blue, White		I	One	
Saint Francis	Red Raiders	Red, White		VI	Private	
Saint Joes	Marauders	Maroon, White		VI	Private	
Saint Lawrence	Larries	Navy, White	1957	X	Two	1982
Saint Johns	Irish	Green, White		VII	Two	1986, 1988, 1989
Saint Mary's	Gaels	Navy and Columbia Blue		VI	Private	
Salmon River	Shamrocks	Green, Black	1951	X	Two	1980, 1981, 1982, 1989, 1992, 2001, 2002
Saranac Lake	Red Storm	Red, Yellow		VII	Two	
Saranac	Chiefs	Red, White	1999	VII	Two	
Saratoga Springs	Blue Streaks	Blue, White		II	One	1999, 2013
Scarsdale	Raiders	Maroon, White		I	One	
Shenendehowa	Plainsmen	Green, White		II	One	
Skaneateles	Lakers	Navy Blue, Vegas Gold		III	Two	1983, 1989, 2015, 2019, 2023, 2024, 2025
Sleepy Hollow/Edgemont/Valhalla				I	Two	
Solvay (NLE / Merged)	Bearcats	Navy Blue, Orange		III	Two	
South Glens Falls	Bulldogs	Red, Blue		II	Two	
Spencerport (Merged)	Rangers	Blue, Gold	1990	V	One	
Starpoint	Spartans	Red, Black	1998	VI	Two	
Suffern	Mounties	Navy, Carolina Blue, White		I	One	1992, 2012, 2022, 2024, 2025, 2026
Sweet Home / Depew	Panth	Navy	2018		One	
Syracuse	Cougars	Black, Silver, White		III	One	2019
Tappan Zee	Dutchmen	Red, Silver, White		I	Two	
Thousand Islands	Vikings	Navy, Gold	1986	X	Two	
Tupper Lake	Lumberjacks	Red, Black		X	Two	
Utica Proctor (NLE / Merged)	Raiders	Red, Black, Silver, White		III	One	
Victor	Blue Devils	Blue, Gold	2001	V	One	2018
Watertown (NLE / Merged)	Cyclones	Purple, White		III	Two	
Watertown IHC	Cavaliers	Royal Blue, White		III	One	
Webster (Later split into 2 programs)	Ridgemen		1971	V	§	
Webster Schroeder	Warriors	Blue, Gold		V	Two	2014
Webster Thomas	Titans	Navy, Gold, White		V	Two	2008
Westmoreland (NLE / Merged)	Bulldogs	Kelly Green, White		III	Two	
West Genesee	Wildcats	Navy Blue, Gold		III	One	1990, 2001, 2010, 2023
West Seneca East	Trojans	Green, Gold	2008	VI	Two	
West Seneca West	Indians	Blue, Gold	2008	VI	One	
WFL Combined	Panthers		2021	V	Two	
White Plains	Tigers	Orange, Black		I	One	
Whitesboro	(none)	Royal Blue, White		III	Two	2003
Williamsville East	Flames	Red, Yellow	1990	VI	Two	2004
Williamsville North	Spartans	Green, Gold	1990	VI	One	2002, 2004, 2006, 2011, 2017
Williamsville South	Billies	Blue, Red	1990	VI	Two	

- Greece Lightning and Greece Thunder were one team.

^ Two championships were when Aquinas was a Division II team

§ Monroe, and Webster as a unified district, did not play under a NYSPHSAA classification.

Rush Henrietta competed as two high schools (Sperry and Roth) starting in 1979 and then merged back into a single entity in 1983.

Pittsford Mendon and Pittsford Sutherland high schools competed as separate entities until their merger in 1986-87 season.

WFL Combined is a merger of NINE school districts in the Western Finger Lakes area: Geneva, Palmyra-Macedon, Midlakes, Penn Yan, Mynderse, Marcus Whitman, Red Jacket, Romulus and Bloomfield.

== NYSAHA Club teams ==
School	Nickname	Colors	Est.	League	State Championships
Arlington	Admirals	Maroon, Vegas Gold		HVHSHA	2012
Bellmore-Merrick	Bulldogs	Maroon and Navy		HSHLNC	2026
Bethpage	Golden Eagles	Gold and Blue		HSHLNC	
Binghamton	Patriots	Red, White, Blue		BCHSHA	
Canisius Club	Crusaders	Blue and Gold		WNYHSCHL	2013
Centereach/Selden	Cougars	Red, White, Blue	1973	SCHSCHL	
Cheektowaga Unified	Warriors	Maroon and Gold	1973	WNYHSCHL	2005, 2006, 2007, 2013, 2014
Chenango Forks	Blue Devils	Blue, Red, White		BCHSHA	
Chenango Valley + Windsor	Warriors, Golden Knights	Red, White, Black or Gold		BCHSHA	
City Honors/Cardinal O'Hara		Gold and Cardinal		WNYHSCHL	2013
Cold Spring Harbor	Seahawks	Scarlet and Navy		HSHLNC	
Comsewogue/Point Jefferson	Warriors	Black and Gold	1973	SCHSHSL	
Connetquot/Sayville	Thunderbirds	Red and Gold	1973	SCHSCHL	2011
Cornwall	Dragons	Green and White		HVHSHA	
East Aurora / Holland	Blue Devils	Blue and Gray	2004	WNYHSCHL	
East Islip	Chiefs	Red and Black		SCHSCHL	
Elmira	Express	Red, black, and white		BCHSHA	
Fredonia/Dunkirk	Steelers	Navy and Columbia Blue	1988	WNYHSCHL	2016
Garden City	Wings	Red and White		HSHLNC	
Half Hollow Hills	Hornets	Red and Black		SCHSCHL	
Hauppauge				SCHSCHL	
Hendrick Hudson	Sailors	Blue and White		HVHSHA	
Jamestown Area		Red and White		WNYHSCHL	
Jericho	Jayhawks	Navy and Gold		HSHLNC	
John Jay	Patriots	White and Blue		HVHSHA	2013
Ketcham/Millbrook				HVHSHA	
Kings Park/Commack				SCHSCHL	2017
Kingston	Tigers	Maroon and White		HVHSHA	
Lancaster Club	Redskins	Red and Black	1973	WNYHSCHL	
Levittown	Falcons	Blue and Orange		HSHLNC	
Locust Valley	Falcons	Green and Black		HSHLNC	
Long Beach	Marines	Blue and Black		HSHLNC	2005, 2011, 2012, 2025
Longwood	Lions	Green and Gold		SCHSHL	
Maine-Endwell	Spartans	Blue, Gold	1979	BCHSHA	
Massapequa	Chiefs	Navy and Gold	1969	HSHLNC	2012
Nichols School	Vikings	Green and White		WNYHSCHL	1919
Northport/Huntington	Tigers	Navy and Gold		SCHSCHL	2015
Oceanside	Sailors	Navy and Columbia Blue		HSHLNC	
Olean Area		Green, White, Black		WNYHSCHL	
Orchard Park Club	Quakers	Maroon and White	1973	WNYHSCHL	
Patchogue-Medford	Raiders	Black and Red		SCHSCHL	
Roosevelt	Presidents	Green and Gold		HVHSHA	
Royhart/Barker/Medina	Knights	Black and White		WNYHSCHL	
Sachem	Arrows	Black and Gold		SCHSCHL	1991,1993,1994
St. Anthony's	Friars	Black and Gold		SCHSCHL	2022, 2023
Saint Francis Club	Red Raiders	Red and White		WNYHSCHL	
Saint Joes Club	Marauders	Maroon and White		WNYHSCHL	
Saint John the Baptist	Cougars	Red and White		SCHSCHL	2014
Saint Mary's	Gaels	Navy and Columbia Blue		WNYHSCHL	1994-1998, 2000-2007
Saint Mary's B	Gaels	Navy and Columbia Blue		WNYHSCHL	
Sewanhaka	Indians	Purple and Gold		HSHLNC	
Smithtown/Hauppauge	Bulls	Blue and Red		SCHSCHL	2016, 2019
Syosset	Braves	Black And Red		HSHLNC	
Union-Endicott	Tigers	Black, Orange		BCHSHA	
Valley Central	Vikings	Blue and White		HVHSHA	
Vestal	Golden Bears	Green, Gold		BCHSHA	
Wantagh/Seaford	Baymen	Black and Gold		HSHLNC	
Warwick	Wildcats	Purple and Gold		HVHSHA	
Washingtonville	Wizards	Blue and Gold		HVHSHA	
Ward Melville	Patriots	Green and Gold		SCHSCHL	2018
West Islip	Lions	Blue and Gold		SCHSCHL	
West Seneca Unified	Trojans/Indians	Blue, Green and Gold		WNYHSCHL	1985 1986 1992

== NYSPHSAA Championship Games ==
Year	Div. I Champion (Section)	Div. I Runner-Up (Section)	Score	Div. II Champion (Section)	Div. II Runner-Up (Section)	Score
1980	Lake Placid (X)	Ithaca (IV)	4-1	Salmon River (X)	CBA Syracuse (III)	4-3
1981	Massena (X)	Ithaca (IV)	4-1	Salmon River (X)	CBA Syracuse (III)	8-1
1982	Massena (X)	Rye (I)	7-0	St. Lawrence (X)	Nyack (IX)	9-0
1983	Skaneateles (III)	Massena (X)	4-2	Albany Academy (II)	Salmon River (X)	2-1
1984	Ithaca (IV)	Rome Free Academy (III)	7-3	Rome Catholic (III)	LaSalle Institute (II)	5-4 (OT)
1985	Liverpool (II)	Ogdensburg (X)	5-4	Rome Catholic (III)	Albany Academy (II)	3-2 (OT)
1986	Rome Free Academy (III)	Skaneateles (III)	6-4	St. John's (VII)	Albany Academy (II)	6-3
1987	Ithaca (IV)	Massena (X)	5-3	Albany Academy (II)	St John's (VII)	3-2
1988	Rome Free Academy (III)	Albany Academy (II)	6-2	St. John's (VII)	Suffern (I)	6-1
1989	St. John's (VII)	Rome Free Academy (II)	5-3	Skaneateles (III)	Salmon River (X)	2-2*
1990	West Genesee (III)	Albany Academy (II)	1-0 (OT)	Glens Falls (II)	Skaneateles (III)	2-1
1991	Albany Academy (II)	Oswego (III)	3-1	Glens Falls (II)	Malone (X)	4-3
1992	Suffern (I)	Massena (X)	4-3 (OT)	Salmon River (X)	Pittsford (V)	8-6
1993	Massena (X)	Saratoga Springs (II)	10-0	Canton (X)	LaSalle Institute (II)	4-2
1994	Ithaca (IV)	Niskayuna (II)	3-2	Canton (X)	Williamsville South (VI)	8-2
1995	Massena (X)	Pittsford (V)	6-3	Clinton (III)	Batavia (V)	5-0
1996	Greece (V)	Oswego (III)	4-3	Clinton (III)	LaSalle Institute (II)	6-5
1997	Canton (X)	Oswego (III)	3-2	New Hartford (III)	Ogdensburg Free Academy (X)	6-2
1998	Canton (X)	Greece (V)	6-2	Aquinas (V)	Plattsburgh (VII)	5-2
1999	Saratoga Springs (II)	Ithaca (IV)	3-0	Aquinas (V)	Cortland-Homer (III)	6-4
2000	Ithaca (IV)	Saratoga Springs (II)	4-0	LaSalle Institute (II)	Glens Falls (II)	4-3
2001	West Genesee (III)	Williamsville North (VI)	4-1	Salmon River (X)	Aquinas (V)	3-1
2002	Williamsville North (VI)	West Genesee (III)	5-3	Salmon River (X)	Clarkstown North (I)	10-0
2003	Brockport (V)	Williamsville North (VI)	5-4 (OT)	Whitesboro (III)	Batavia (V)	2-1
2004	Williamsville North (VI)	Seton Catholic (VII)	5-2	Williamsville East (VI)	Salmon River (X)	3-2 (OT)
2005	McQuaid (V)	Baldwinsville (III)	7-3	Clinton (III)	Salmon River (X)	4-3
2006	Williamsville North (VI)	Aquinas (V)	1-0	Clinton (III)	Monroe-Woodbury (IX)	4-1
2007	Ithaca (IV)	Williamsville North (VI)	2-1 (OT)	Monroe-Woodbury (IX)	Canandaigua (V)	4-2
2008	Massena (X)	West Genesee (III)	3-2 (OT)	Webster Thomas (V)	Thousand Islands (X)	5-2
2009	Greece Athena/Odyssey (V)	Mamaroneck (I)	3-2	New Hartford (III)	Pelham (I)	6-1
2010	West Genesee (III)	Saratoga Springs (II)	3-0	New Hartford (III)	Queensbury (II)	5-2
2011	Williamsville North (VI)	Saratoga Springs (II)	3-2	Cazenovia (III)	Williamsville East (VI)	6-2
2012	Suffern (I)	Pittsford (V)	3-2	Kenmore East (VI)	Oswego (III)	6-3
2013	Saratoga Springs (II)	McQuaid (V)	5-0	Syracuse CBA/J-D (III)	John Jay (I)	4-2
2014	Massena (X)	Ithaca (IV)	4-1	Webster Schroeder (V)	Beekmantown (VII)	2-0
2015	McQuaid (V)	Baldwinsville (III)	6-2	Skaneateles (III)	Williamsville East (VI)	5-2
2016	Mamaroneck (I)	West Genesee (III)	1-0	Kenmore East (VI)	Skaneateles (III)	3-2 (OT)
2017	Williamsville North (VI)	Pittsford (V)	3-2	Pelham (I)	St. Lawrence (X)	7-1
2018	Victor (V)	Niagara Wheatfield (VI)	5-1	Sweet Home (VI)	West Seneca West (VI)	7-5
2019	Syracuse (III)	Suffern (I)	4-2	Skaneateles (III)	Queensbury (II)	6-1
2022	Suffern (I)	West Genesee (III)	5-2	Pelham (I)	Starpoint (VI)	7-6 (OT)
2023	West Genesee (III)	Suffern (I)	6-0	Skaneateles (III)	Pelham (I)	4-1
2024	Suffern (I)	Orchard Park (VI)	6-2	Skaneateles (III)	Queensbury (II)	5-1
2025	Suffern (I)	West Genesee (III)	3-1	Skaneateles (III)	Ogdensburg Free Academy (X)	3-0
2026	Suffern (I)	Canton (X)	5-2	Rye (I)	Byram Hills (I)	5-1

- Shared Championship

Total Championships by School (as of 2026)

School	Div. I	Div. II	Total
Skaneateles	1	6	7
Massena	6	0	6
Suffern	6	0	6
Ithaca	5	0	5
Salmon River	0	5	5
Williamsville North	5	0	5
Canton	2	2	4
Clinton	0	4	4
West Genesee	4	0	4
Albany Academy	1	2	3
New Hartford	0	3	3
St. John's	1	2	3
Aquinas	0	2	2
Glens Falls	0	2	2
Kenmore East	0	2	2
McQuaid	2	0	2
Pelham	0	2	2
Rome Catholic	0	2	2
Rome Free Academy	2	0	2
Saratoga Springs	2	0	2
Brockport	1	0	1
Cazenovia	0	1	1
Greece	1	0	1
Greece Athena/Odyssey	1	0	1
LaSalle Institute	0	1	1
Lake Placid	1	0	1
Liverpool	1	0	1
Mamaroneck	1	0	1
Monroe-Woodbury	0	1	1
Rye	0	1	1
St. Lawrence	0	1	1
Sweet Home	0	1	1
Syracuse	1	0	1
Syracuse CBA/J-D	0	1	1
Victor	1	0	1
Webster Schroeder	0	1	1
Webster Thomas	0	1	1
Whitesboro	0	1	1
Williamsville East	0	1	1

== CHSAA Championships ==
Year	Catholic Champion	Catholic Runner-Up	Score
2002	Bishop Timon/Saint Jude	Msgr. Farrell	6-1
2003	St. Joes	Iona Prep	6-5 (OT)
2004	St. Joes	Iona Prep	5-1
2005	St. Joes	Chaminade	5-1
2006	St. Joes	Fordham Prep	3-0
2007	St. Joes	Fordham Prep	3-2
2008	St. Joes	Iona Prep	5-1
2009	Canisius	Msgr. Farrell	5-1
2010	Canisius	St. Anthony's	2-1
2011	St. Joes	St. Anthony's	3-2
2012	St. Anthony's	St. Francis	4-3
2013	St. Joes	St. Anthony's	3-0
2014	St. Joes	St. Anthony's	2-1
2015	Canisius	Chaminade	6-1
2016	St. Joes	St. Anthony's	2-1 (OT)
2017	St. Joes	St. Anthony's	5-2
2018	St. Anthony's	St. Mary's	4-1
2019	St. Joes	Fordham Prep	9-1
2020	St. Mary's	Chaminade	4-1
2021	Game not held (COVID-19)		
2022	Nichols	Chaminade	5-4 (OT)
2023	Nichols	Chaminade	4-3
2024	St. Joes	Msgr. Farrell	3-2 (OT)
2025	St. Joes	Iona Prep	2-0
2026	Canisius	Chaminade	4-1

== NYSAHA Championships ==
Year	Large School Champion	Large School Runner-Up	Score	Small School Champion	Small School Runner-Up	Score
2003	St. Marys	North Tonawanda	9-0	Southwestern/Maple Grove	Maryvale	10-1
2004	St. Marys	Lancaster		Cheektowaga	Southwestern/Maple Grove	4-1
2005	St. Marys	Orchard Park	5-3	Long Beach	Cheektowaga	5-3
2006	St. Marys	Orchard Park	5-3	Cheektowaga	Starpoint	11-2
2007	St. Marys	St. Anthony's	5-1	Lew-Port	Cheektowaga	3-1
2008	St. Anthony's	Niagara Wheatfield	6-3	Comsewogue/Pt Jeff	Depew	7-4

Year	Champion	Runner-Up
2009	Not Played	Not Played
2010	John Jay	Sachem
2011	Long Beach	Arlington
2012	Arlington	Connetquot/Sayville
2013	John Jay	Unknown
2014	St. John the Baptist	Arlington
2015	Northport/Huntington	Arlington
2016	Smithtown/Hauppague	Ward Melville
2017	Kings Park/Commack	East Islip
2018	Ward Melville	Kings Park/Commack
2019	Smithtown/Hauppague	Washingtonville
2020	Smithtown/Hauppague	Washingtonville
2021	Not Played	Not Played
2022	St. Anthonys	Northport/Huntington
2023	St. Anthonys	East Islip
2024	Long Beach	Arlington
2025	Long Beach	Arlington
2026	Bellmore-Merrick	Buffalo Red Raiders

== Notable alumni ==
- Dustin Brown
- Robert Esche
- Todd Marchant
- Lee Stempniak
- Brian Gionta
- Marty Reasoner
- Craig Conroy
- Chris Collins
- Rob Schremp
- Todd Krygier
- Guy Hebert
- Brooks Orpik
- Patrick Kane
- Erik Cole

== Sources ==
- New York State Public High School Athletic Association. N.Y.S.P.H.S.A.A.
- New York State Amateur Hockey Association. N.Y.S.A.H.A.
- NYSAHA State Tournament Winners https://cdn1.sportngin.com/attachments/document/da34-2131286/State_Winners_1980-1994.pdf
