= David Kim (violinist) =

American classical violinist (born 1963)

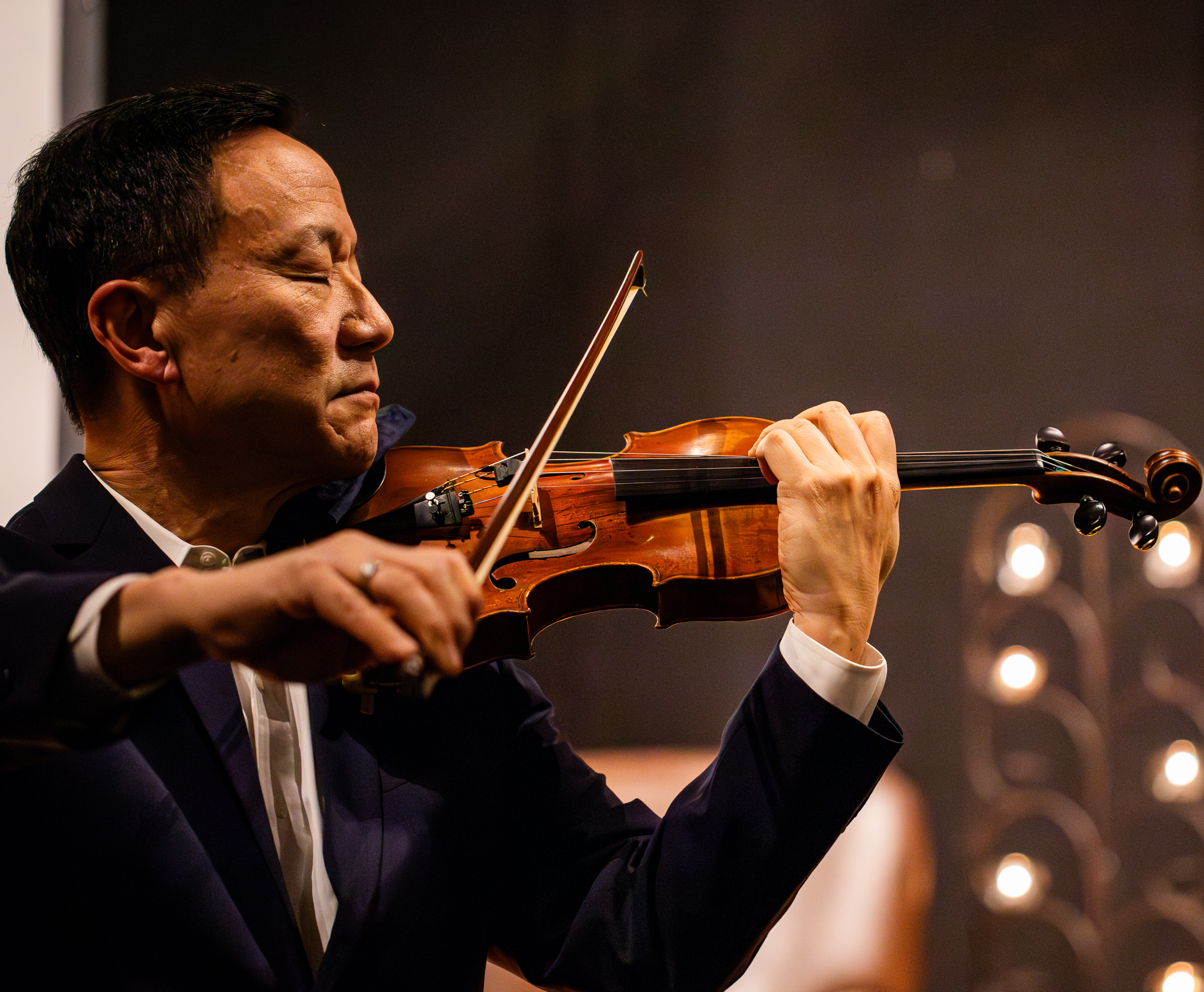
- Kim in 2024

Background information
- Born: 24 May 1963 (age 62); Carbondale, Illinois
- Genres: Classical
- Occupations: violinist, concertmaster, pedagogue
- Instrument: violin
- Website: www.davidkimviolin.com

David Kim (born 24 May, 1963) is an American violinist. He has been the concertmaster of the Philadelphia Orchestra since 1999 and was the only American to win a prize at the 1986 International Tchaikovsky Competition in Moscow.

== Early life and education ==
Kim was born in Carbondale, Illinois on 24 May, 1963. His studies of violin started at age three, in Rochester, New York, and started studying with Dorothy DeLay at eight. In 1979, he graduated from Williamsville North High School in Amherst, NY, and then studied at the Juilliard School where received his bachelor's and master's degrees.

== Career ==
In 1986, Kim was the only American to win a prize at the 1986 International Tchaikovsky Competition in Moscow, where he got sixth prize. In 1987, he became a soloist with the Naumburg Orchestral Concerts, in the Naumburg Bandshell, Central Park, in the summer series.

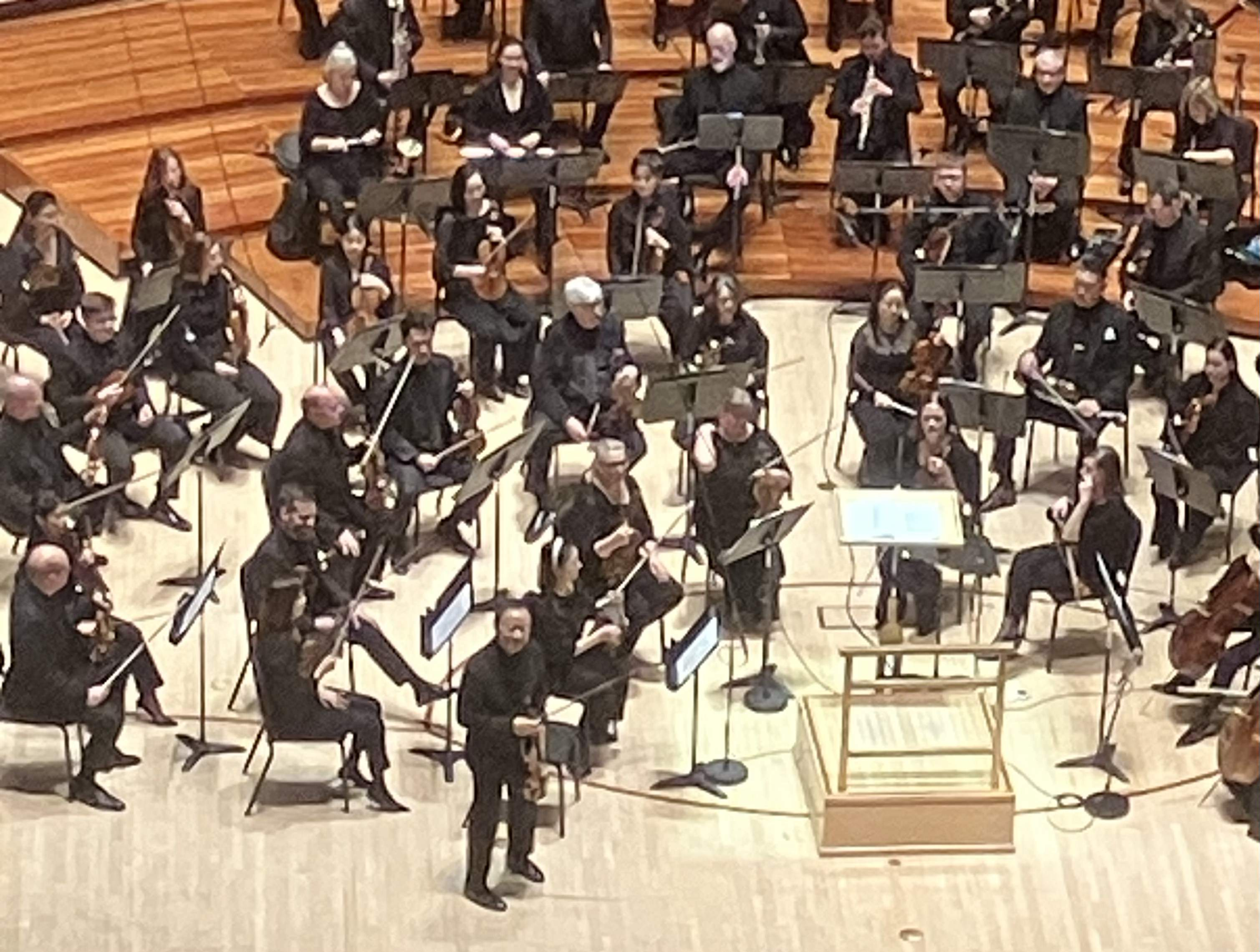
Kim (bottom left center) with the Philadelphia Orchestra in 2026

Kim became the concertmaster of the Philadelphia Orchestra in 1999. He is also a soloist in The Philadelphia Orchestra as well in many other orchestras in the world. He has played with the All-Star Orchestra and performed with orchestras in Dallas, Pittsburgh, Sacramento, Korea, and Moscow. Kim has received honorary doctorates from Eastern University and Dickinson College.

The instrument Kim uses is a c. 1757 J.B. Guadagnini made in Milan, Italy. It is on loan from the Philadelphia Orchestra.

== Personal life ==
Kim resides in a Philadelphia suburb with his wife and two daughters. He also serves on the advisory board of the San Jose Youth Symphony.
