= Suicide of Jamey Rodemeyer =

Suicide by a bullied American blogger teenager

Jamey Rodemeyer
- Rodemeyer's school yearbook photo
- Born: March 21, 1997; Buffalo, New York, U.S.
- Died: September 18, 2011 (aged 14); Amherst, New York, U.S.
- Cause of death: Suicide by hanging
- Occupation: Student
- Known for: Activism against homophobic bullying Blogger on Tumblr and YouTube
- Website: hausofjamey-blog.tumblr.com

James T. Rodemeyer (March 21, 1997 – September 18, 2011) was an American teenager from Amherst, New York, who was known for his activism against homophobia and his videos on YouTube to help victims of homophobic bullying. Rodemeyer died by suicide on September 18, 2011, after having been a victim of homophobic bullying himself. This was also the first suicide of a major YouTuber.

== Personal life ==
Jamey Rodemeyer lived with his parents, Tim and Tracy Rodemeyer, and his older sister Alyssa in their home near Buffalo, New York. He had attended Heim Middle School in the past and was a freshman at Williamsville North High School at the time of his death.

He was open about his bisexuality, and faced severe bullying as a result of it. Rodemeyer's inspiration to help others came from Lady Gaga, whom he admired most. He often referred to her in his videos, and quoted her lyrics to provide guidance to others.

== Activism ==
Rodemeyer encountered bullying throughout middle school because of his sexuality. He would commonly receive anonymously posted comments on his Formspring account, that included hate messages such as, "JAMIE IS STUPID, GAY, FAT AND UGLY. HE MUST DIE!" or "I wouldn't care if you died. No one would. So just do it :) It would make everyone WAY more happier!". Despite this, he used his experiences to make videos on YouTube under the username xgothemo99xx to help others who were experiencing similar situations. He also made a video for the "It Gets Better Project", a website dedicated to preventing teen suicide.

== Death ==
Rodemeyer was found dead by his older sister Alyssa in the backyard on the morning of September 18, 2011, in an apparent suicide by hanging. Before his death, he posted a final update on Twitter directed to Lady Gaga. The tweet read, "@ladygaga bye mother monster, thank you for all you have done, paws up forever".

=== Law enforcement and media response ===
The Amherst, New York police department launched a criminal investigation after Rodemeyer's death, assisted by Erie County district attorney Frank Sedita. The investigation lasted nine weeks, and included analysis of Jamey's home computer and mobile phone records. Although possible evidence of criminal harassment was found, these incidents either had insufficient evidence to prosecute or were expired beyond the statute of limitations. The investigation concluded with no charges filed.

News of Rodemeyer's death resulted in outrage by supporters worldwide. Following his death, Tim and Tracy Rodemeyer were interviewed by news media about their son and his struggles against bullying. Both parents took the opportunity to promote peace and equality in the hope of preventing occurrences similar to this.

In an interview with Ann Curry on The Today Show, Rodemeyer's parents said that they, their daughter and son were still being bullied, even after his suicide. When his sister attended a school homecoming dance, Jamey's friends began chanting his name in support when a Lady Gaga song began playing. As a result, the very same bullies at the dance began chanting that they were glad he was dead.

=== Celebrity response and subsequent events ===
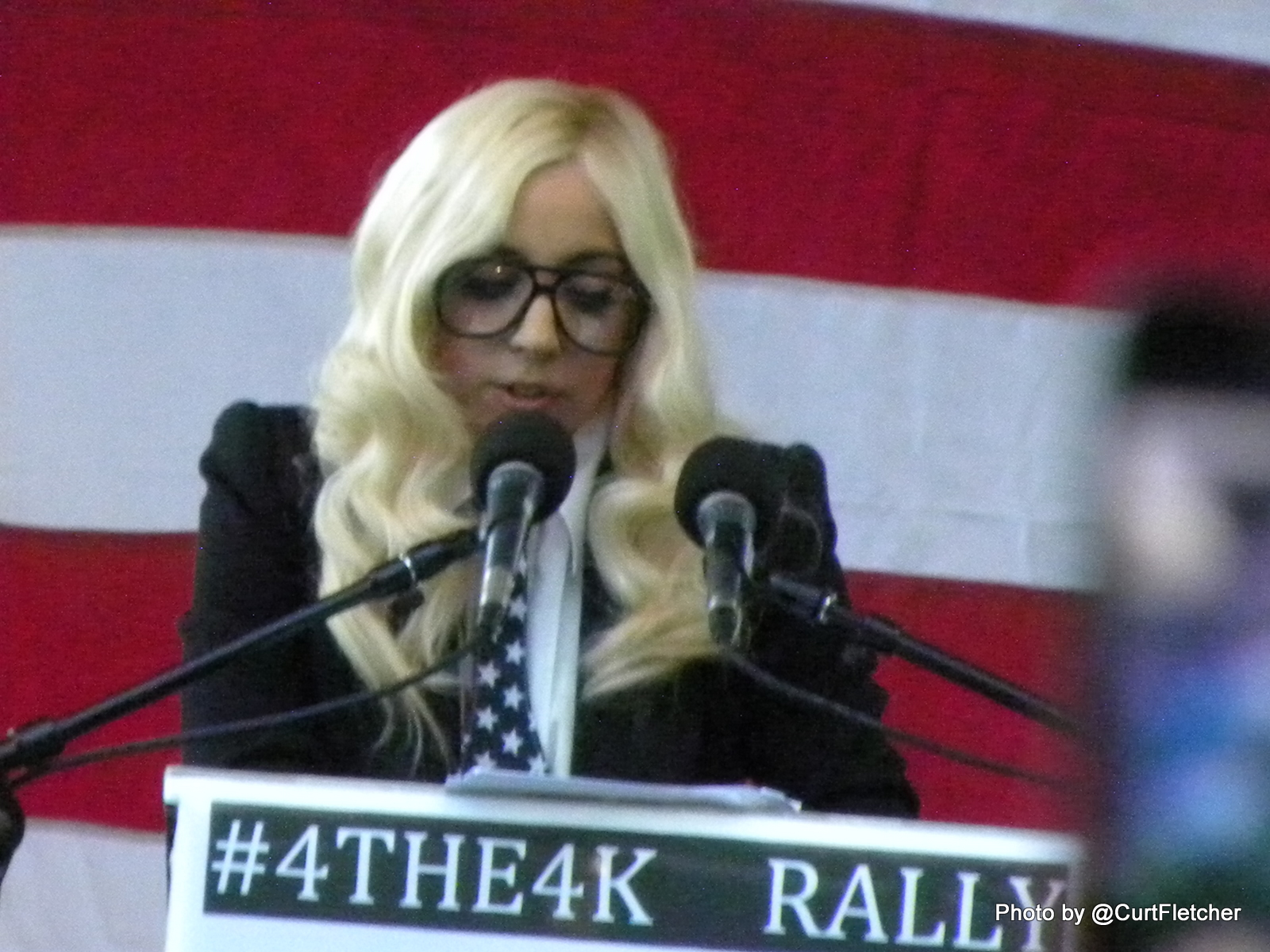
Singer Lady Gaga (pictured in 2010) founded the nonprofit Born This Way Foundation following Rodemeyer's suicide.

Upon learning of his death, Lady Gaga stated that she was upset, spending her days "reflecting, crying and yelling." She went on to dedicate her song "Hair" to Rodemeyer during a performance at the iHeartRadio music festival at the MGM Grand Hotel in Las Vegas, saying, "I wrote this record about how your identity is really all you've got when you're in school...so tonight, Jamey, I know you're up there looking at us and you're not a victim. You're a lesson to all of us. I know it's a bit of a downer, but sometimes the right thing is more important than the music." Lady Gaga later met with President Barack Obama to discuss what his administration would do to prevent bullying in schools.

Also in response to his death, reigning Miss New York Kaitlin Monte founded an online petition to bring the issue of cyberbullying (known as "Jamey's Law") to New York legislators. Shortly after, State Senator Jeffrey D. Klein proposed new cyberbullying legislation. The two joined to launch the New York Cyberbully Census.

In October 2011, actor Zachary Quinto noted Rodemeyer's death as the genesis of his decision to come out publicly as gay, saying on his website "...but in light of Jamey's death – it became clear to me in an instant that living a gay life without publicly acknowledging it – is simply not enough to make any significant contribution to the immense work that lies ahead on the road to complete equality". In response to Quinto's coming out (and in reaction to gay suicides caused by bullying), Dan Kloeffler of ABC News Now also came out.

That same month another teenager, Jamie Hubley, was reported to have died by suicide for the same reason. While he never explicitly talked about Rodemeyer, comparisons have been drawn.

The Fox TV show Glee referred to Rodemeyer when Finn (Cory Monteith) talked to Santana (Naya Rivera) about gay suicide in the episode "I Kissed a Girl", and in the episode "On My Way" when David Karofsky (Max Adler), a gay student, tries to kill himself by hanging as a result of the bullying that had befallen him because of his sexuality.
