= Somei =

Somei may refer to:

- Somei Satoh (born 1947), Japanese classical composer
- Somei..., 2009 album by Merzbow
- Somei village, part of Toshima, Japan

== See also ==
- Somei Yoshino, a hybrid Japanese cherry blossom tree
