= Anne Akiko Meyers =

American violinist (born 1970)

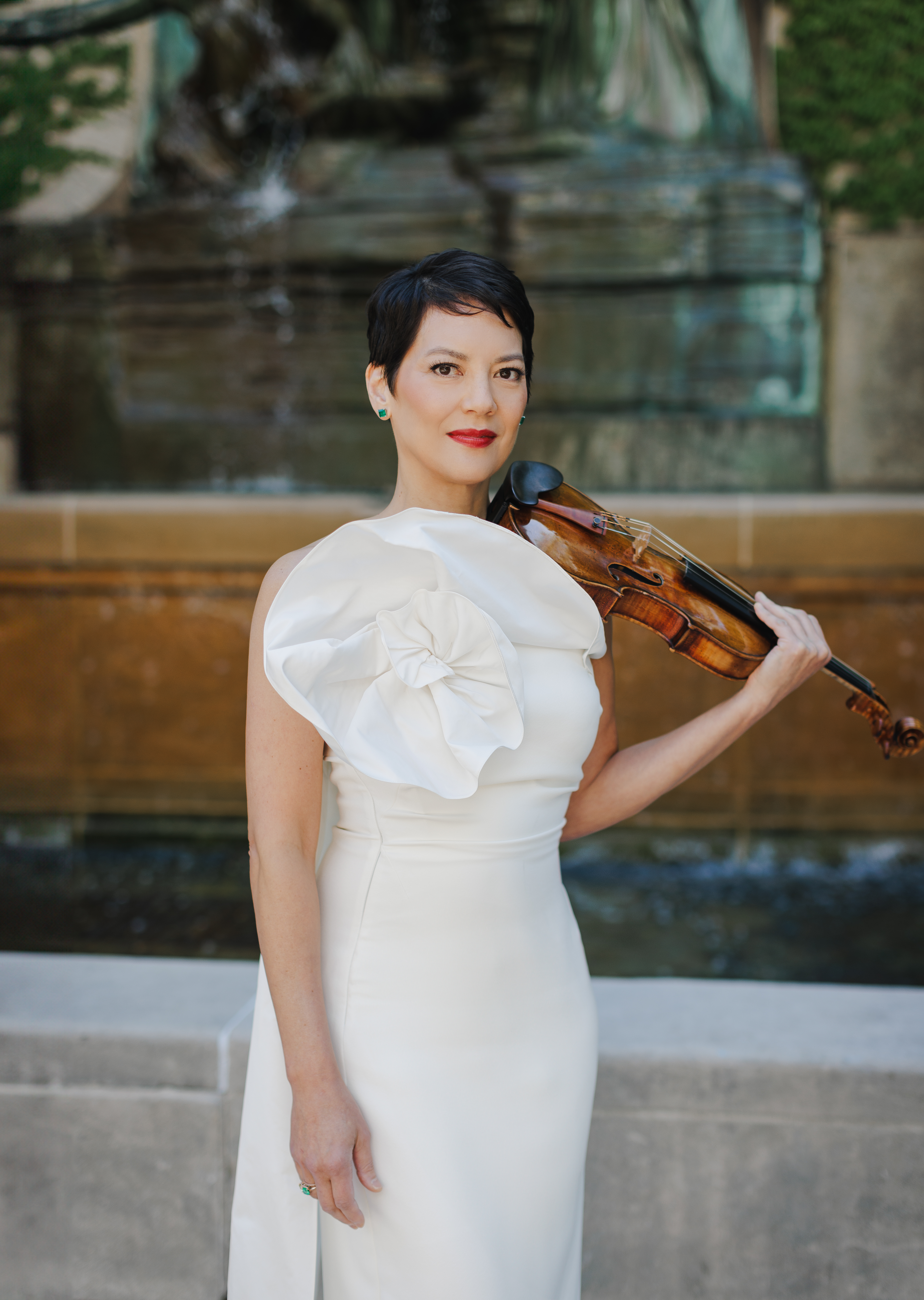

Background information
- Born: May 15, 1970 (age 56); San Diego, California, United States
- Origin: New York City
- Genre: Classical
- Occupation: Violinist
- Instrument: Violin
- Years active: 1985–present
- Labels: Apple Music, E1, Sony, RCA Victor Red Seal, Avie
- Website: anneakikomeyers.com

Anne Akiko Meyers (born May 15, 1970, in San Diego) is an American violinist. Her album Fandango, was awarded two Latin Grammy's for Best Classical Album and Best Contemporary Composition at the 25th Latin Grammy Awards. She also received two GRAMMY nominations.

Meyers was the top-selling classical instrumentalist on Billboard’s traditional classical chart in 2014. She appeared on NPR's Tiny Desk Concert series in 2023, served as Artistic Director of the 2024 Laguna Beach Music Festival, and was inducted into the 2024 Asian Hall of Fame.

In 2025, Meyers released three albums: Blue Electra, Beloved, and Philip Glass: Violin Concerto No. 1.

== Early life and education ==
The daughter of an artist and a college president, Meyers was born in California. Her mother is of Japanese descent, and her father American. She was raised in Southern California, studied with Shirley Helmick, and then with Alice and Eleonore Schoenfeld at the preparatory division of the University of Southern California's Thornton School of Music in Los Angeles. In 1980, the Thornton School of Music and its preparatory division ended their relationship, and the preparatory division moved locations and was renamed the Colburn School.

She then studied with Josef Gingold at Indiana University, and with Dorothy DeLay, Felix Galimir, and Masao Kawasaki at the Juilliard School in New York City. She graduated from Juilliard at age 20 and began touring internationally and recording.

== Early career ==
Described as a child prodigy after her debut with a local community orchestra at the age of 7, she subsequently performed with the Los Angeles Philharmonic, twice on The Tonight Show with Johnny Carson at age 11, the Emmy Award Show and the New York Philharmonic at age 12.

When she was 16, Meyers signed with ICM Artists and began touring and recording. She recorded her first album in London at the Abbey Road Studios, featuring the Barber and Bruch Concertos with the Royal Philharmonic Orchestra. She later signed with RCA Victor Red Seal.

== Instruments ==
Meyers has lifetime use of the 1741 Vieuxtemps Guarneri "del Gesu". She previously toured with a 1730 Stradivarius violin called the "Royal Spanish", and a 1697 Stradivarius called the "Molitor Stradivarius". In her recording of Bach's Concerto in D minor for Two Violins, BWV 1043, she plays both parts—one part on the Royal Spanish and the other on the Molitor.

== Professional career ==
Meyers has performed as guest soloist with the Philadelphia Orchestra, Royal Philharmonic Orchestra, Vienna Symphony, and Orchestre de Paris. She also has played solo recitals in Carnegie Hall, the Hollywood Bowl, and Lincoln Center.

Meyers collaborated with the singer Michael Bolton. She was also the special guest violinist in Il Divo's Christmas Tour 2009 and toured with jazz and pop trumpeter Chris Botti in 2010. On September 11, 2015, Naïve Classiques released "Passacaglia" Works for violin and orchestra by Arvo Pärt with MDR Leipzig Radio Symphony Orchestra (Kristjan Jarvi conducting), in celebration of Pärt's 80th birthday.

The Engagements written by novelist J. Courtney Sullivan is loosely based on Meyers's career; it was one of People Magazine's Top 10 Books of the Year in 2014. Meyers also played the violinist character, Violetta, in Crumpet the Trumpet by children's book author and illustrator, Kristine Papillon. Meyers' recording of Einojuhani Rautavaara's Fantasia was the only classical instrumental work included by NPR in their list of 100 best songs of 2017.

Meyers appeared on NPR's Tiny Desk Concert series on September 7, 2023.

In 2024, she served as Artistic Director of the Laguna Beach Music Festival, a multi-day series of classical and contemporary concerts, community engagement programs, and dynamic special events.

=== Commissions and premieres ===
Works written expressly for Meyers include the Somei Satoh Violin Concerto, recorded live with Tetsuji Honna and the Tokyo Metropolitan Symphony Orchestra in 2002, and Angelfire by Joseph Schwantner, premiered live in 2002 at the Kennedy Center conducted by Marin Alsop and recorded in 2004 with Andrew Litton and the Dallas Symphony Orchestra.

Meyers asked the jazz star Wynton Marsalis to write cadenzas for her in Mozart's Violin Concerto No. 3 in G Major, which she premiered with the Utah Symphony Orchestra in 2009. Meyers commissioned Mason Bates to write his first violin concerto, and she performed in the world premiere with Leonard Slatkin and the Pittsburgh Symphony Orchestra in December 2012. It was later recorded with the London Symphony Orchestra under Leonard Slatkin and released on Meyers' 2014 album, The American Masters. She has performed the work with the Chicago Symphony Orchestra, Detroit Symphony Orchestra, Orchestre National de Lyon, and New Zealand Symphony Orchestra.

On September 30, 2014, Meyers released The American Masters, which includes two world premieres: Mason Bates's Violin Concerto and the Lullaby for Natalie by John Corigliano, written for the birth of her first-born daughter, Natalie. The album also includes Samuel Barber's Violin Concerto.

Meyers appeared in a nationwide PBS broadcast special aired in fall 2015 featuring the world premiere of Samuel Jones' Violin Concerto with the All-Star Orchestra led by Gerard Schwarz. The performance was also part of a Naxos Records DVD.

In September 2015, Meyers released Serenade: The Love Album, her 34th album, featuring Leonard Bernstein's epic Serenade. Meyers commissioned seven arrangers including Adam Schoenberg, Brad Dechter, J.A.C. Redford, and Steven Mercurio to arrange ten love-inspired works from classic movies and the American Songbook. The seven arrangers were chosen to resemble the seven philosophers of Plato's Symposium, which Bernstein's Serenade is based on. The album was recorded with the London Symphony Orchestra with Keith Lockhart conducting.

Meyers performed the posthumous world premiere of Fantasia by Einojuhani Rautavaara, written for her, with the Kansas City Symphony conducted by Michael Stern in March 2017. Meyers met Rautavaara at his home in December 2015 to play the work for him. He died in July 2016 before its first public performance nearly a year later.

Adam Schoenberg's first violin concerto, Orchard in Fog, written for Meyers, was premiered by her with the San Diego Symphony and conductor Sameer Patel in February 2018. The Violin Channel live-streamed the performance.

In May 2020, Meyers released the world premiere recording of Arvo Pärt's Estonian Lullaby for violin and piano, which was dedicated to her. She also released an accompanying animated watercolor video, produced in collaboration with Skazka Studios.

In July 2021, Meyers premiered John Corigliano's new cadenzas to Beethoven's Violin Concerto in D Major, Op. 61 at the Brevard Music Center with conductor Keith Lockhart.

In August 2021, Meyers gave the world premiere of Arturo Marquez's violin concerto, Fandango, at the Hollywood Bowl with the Los Angeles Philharmonic and conductor Gustavo Dudamel. She went on to perform the work at Carnegie Hall and at the 10,000-seat Auditorio Nacional in Mexico City in October 2022 with the Los Angeles Philharmonic and Gustavo Dudamel, and to champion the work with many other orchestras across the country.

In November 2022, Meyers premiered Blue Electra by Michael Daugherty – a work written for Meyers and dedicated to Amelia Earhart – with the National Symphony Orchestra led by Gianandrea Noseda at the Kennedy Center, which was broadcast by medici.tv.

On November 18 and 19, 2023, she gave the world premiere of Billy Childs' In the Arms of the Beloved alongside the Los Angeles Master Chorale, the Billy Childs Jazz-Chamber Ensemble, and the Lyris Quartet.

Blue Electra was released on April 11, 2025, on Naxos, featuring Meyers performing with the Albany Symphony under the direction of David Alan Miller.

Her follow-up album, Beloved, released on May 9, 2025, on Platoon, presents world-premiere recordings of works by Billy Childs, Eric Whitacre, and Ola Gjeilo with the Los Angeles Master Chorale.

On June 13, 2025, Meyers released Philip Glass: Violin Concerto No. 1 on Platoon, featuring a performance with Gustavo Dudamel and the Los Angeles Philharmonic, the world-premiere recording of New Chaconne, composed for her by Glass, and Echorus, performed with violinist Aubree Oliverson. In its review, Gramophone noted: “Meyers's violin announces itself confidently and assertively, setting the tone for the rest of the movement...Meyers's performance is imbued with expressive weight and power: Glass carved in the image of Mendelssohn and Bruch.”

=== Billboard charts ===
Air – The Bach Album debuted at No. 1 on the US Billboard charts on its release on February 14, 2012. It featured "Bach Double" played on two different Stradivarius violins.

Meyers' performance of The Vivaldi Four Seasons Album debuted at No. 1 on the US Billboard charts when released on February 14, 2014. In 2014, she was the top-selling classical instrumentalist on Billboard's traditional classical charts.

=== Grammy Awards ===
Her album Fandango won two Latin GRAMMY Awards – Best Classical Album and Best Classical Contemporary Composition – at the 25th Latin GRAMMY Awards in Miami. The album features the live world premiere of Arturo Márquez's new concerto for violin and orchestra by the same name, written for Meyers, recorded with the L.A. Philharmonic and conductor Gustavo Dudamel. The project also earned Meyers two GRAMMY nominations.

== Awards and honors ==
In 1993 at the age of 23, Meyers received the Avery Fisher Career Grant, which is awarded by Lincoln Center for the Performing Arts to up to five promising young artists each year.

In 2006, she served as a panelist, recitalist, and teacher at the Juilliard School's Starling-DeLay Symposium. In May 2008, UCLA invited her to be the Regent's Lecturer in violin.

In late 2009, Meyers joined the Butler School of Music at University of Texas at Austin as Distinguished Artist and Professor of Violin.

In September 2015, she was honored with a Luminary Award by the Pasadena Symphony for her long-standing support of that orchestra.

In December 2022, Meyers was named a new trustee of The Juilliard School alongside singer-songwriter Jon Batiste.

In 2023, Meyers received an honorary doctorate from the Colburn School.

Meyers was inducted into the 2024 Asian Hall of Fame. She also serves on the board of the Dudamel Foundation.

== Personal life ==
Meyers lives with her husband and two daughters in Pacific Palisades, California outside of Los Angeles.

After being directly affected by the Pacific Palisades fires and subsequent evacuations, Meyers commissioned a commemorative piece by Eric Whitacre, titled “The Pacific Has No Memory”, which honors the community in the aftermath of the devastation. In 2026, Classical Voice North America described her tribute performance of the work as emotionally powerful and ‘a master class … delivering emotional truth,’ noting her role in organizing and performing a commemorative concert after the Pacific Palisades fire.

== Discography ==
The following releases feature Meyers on violin.

| Year | Album | Label |
|---|---|---|
| 2026 | Eric Whitacre The Pacific Has No Memory world premiere recording with Orpheus Chamber Orchestra | Avie Records |
| 2025 | Philip Glass: Violin Concerto No. 1 with Los Angeles Philharmonic and Gustavo Dudamel | Platoon |
| 2025 | Beloved world-premiere recordings of works by Billy Childs, Eric Whitacre, and Ola Gjeilo with the Los Angeles Master Chorale. | Platoon |
| 2025 | Blue Electra with the Albany Symphony and David Alan Miller | Naxos |
| 2023 | Fandango with Los Angeles Philharmonic and Gustavo Dudamel | Platoon |
| 2022/2023 | Mysterium with Los Angeles Master Chorale and Grant Gershon | Avie Records |
| 2022 | Shining Night with Jason Vieaux and Fabio Bidini | Avie Records |
| 2020 | Estonian Lullaby with Reiko Uchida | Avie Records |
| 2018 | Mirror in Mirror with Philharmonia Orchestra, Kristjan Järvi, and Akira Eguchi | Avie Records |
| 2018 | Special release of Bernstein's Serenade (A live performance with the BBC Scottish Symphony Orchestra, conducted by Ilan Volkov) | BBC Music Magazine |
| 2017 | Fantasia: The Fantasy Album with Kristjan Järvi and the Philharmonia Orchestra | Avie Records |
| 2016 | Fantasia by Einojuhani Rautavaara (single) with Kristjan Järvi and the Philharmonia Orchestra | eOne |
| 2016 | Anne Akiko Meyers: The Complete RCA Recordings | RCA Red Seal |
| 2015 | Serenade: The Love Album with the London Symphony Orchestra & Keith Lockhart | eOne |
| 2015 | The Kristjan Järvi Sound Project – Arvo Pärt: Passacaglia with MDR Leipzig Radio Symphony Orchestra & Kristjan Jarvi | Naïve Records |
| 2015 | All-Star Orchestra: Program 12: Mozart and a World Premiere with Gerard Schwarz | Naxos Records |
| 2014 | The Four Seasons: The Vivaldi Album | eOne |
| 2014 | The American Masters: Barber, Corigliano, Bates with the London Symphony Orchestra & Leonard Slatkin | eOne |
| 2012 | Air – The Bach Album with the English Chamber Orchestra | eOne |
| 2011 | Pride from Gems with Michael Bolton | Mointaigne / Legacy / Sony |
| 2010 | Seasons...Dreams with pianist Reiko Uchida and harpist Emmanuel Ceysson | eOne |
| 2009 | Smile with Akira Eguchi | Koch International Classics |
| 2006 | Bruch Violin Concerto No.1 in G minor, Live from Japan | |
| 2006 | Jennifer Higdon Piano Trio. Live from the Vilar Center, Vail | Naxos |
| 2005 | Angelfire by Joseph Schwantner, 'Fantasy' for amplified violin and orchestra with Andrew Litton and Dallas Symphony Orchestra | Hyperion |
| 2003 | East Meets West (Japanese/French album) with Li Jian | Avie Records |
| 2002 | Kisetsu: Works By Somei Satoh 3 (Violin Concerto written for Meyers). Live with the Tokyo Metropolitan Symphony Orchestra | Camerata Tokyo |
| 2001 | Romantic Violin | RCA Red Seal |
| 2000 | Violin for Relaxation | Sony Classical |
| 1999 | UltraSound Music for the Unborn Child | Sony Classical |
| 1997 | Franz Schubert in Performance from NPR | National Public Radio |
| 1996 | Classical Ecstasy | RCA Red Seal |
| 1995 | Sergei Prokofiev Violin Concertos with the Frankfurt Radio Symphony Orchestra & Dmitri Kitayenko | RCA Red Seal |
| 1995 | The American Album | RCA Red Seal |
| 1994 | Salut d'Amour | RCA Red Seal |
| 1993 | Mendelssohn Violin Concerto and other works with the Philharmonia Orchestra & Andrew Litton | RCA Red Seal |
| 1992 | Franck and Strauss Sonatas for Violin and Piano with Rohan de Silva | RCA Red Seal |
| 1991 | Lalo: Symphonie espagnole; Bruch: Scottish Fantasy with the RPO & Jesus Lopez-Cobos | RCA Red Seal |
| 1989 | Saint-Saëns, Fauré: Violin Sonatas | Canyon Classics |
| 1988 | Barber/Bruch Violin Concertos with the Royal Philharmonic Orchestra and Christopher Seaman | Royal Philharmonic Orchestra |

== Music videos ==
- Vivaldi Triple Concerto – Anne Akiko Meyers Performs all three parts
- Summer from Vivaldi's Four Seasons
- Winter from Vivaldi's Four Seasons
- On the Tonight Show with Johnny Carson at age 11
- Fandango, Anne Akiko Meyers, Gustavo Dudamel, LA Phil – Fandango by Arturo Márquez on Platoon
