= Wes Phillips =

American football player and coach (born 1979)

Minnesota Vikings
- Title: Offensive coordinator

Personal information
- Born: February 17, 1979 (age 47); Houston, Texas, U.S.
- Listed height: 6 ft 4 in (1.93 m)
- Listed weight: 220 lb (100 kg)

Career information
- Position: Quarterback
- High school: Williamsville North (Williamsville, New York)
- College: UTEP (1999–2001)

Career history

Playing
- San Diego Riptide (2002–2003)

Coaching
- UTEP (2003) Student assistant; West Texas A&M (2004–2005) Quarterbacks coach; Baylor (2006) Quarterbacks coach; Dallas Cowboys (2007–2013); Quality control / offensive assistant (2007–2010); Assistant offensive line coach (2011–2012); Tight ends coach (2013); Washington Redskins (2014–2018) Tight ends coach; Los Angeles Rams (2019–2021); Tight ends coach (2019–2020); Tight ends coach & pass game coordinator (2021); Minnesota Vikings (2022–present) Offensive coordinator

Awards and highlights
- As coach: Super Bowl champion (LVI)
- Coaching profile at Pro Football Reference

Wesley Wade Phillips (born February 17, 1979) is an American professional football coach and former quarterback who is the offensive coordinator for the Minnesota Vikings of the National Football League (NFL). He is the son of former Denver Broncos, Buffalo Bills, and Dallas Cowboys head coach Wade Phillips and the grandson of former Houston Oilers and New Orleans Saints head coach Bum Phillips.

== Early life ==
Wes Phillips was born on February 17, 1979, in Houston, Texas, when his grandfather Bum Phillips was the head coach of the Houston Oilers and his father Wade Phillips was serving as their defensive line coach. The younger Phillips attended the University of Texas at El Paso, where he earned three letters playing football for the Miners after playing and graduating from Williamsville North High School. He was a backup quarterback during the 2000 season, when UTEP won the Western Athletic Conference title. As a senior, Phillips became the starting quarterback, completing 143 of 257 passes for 1,839 yards with 10 touchdowns and 11 interceptions while also scoring two rushing touchdowns. In 2001, he graduated from UTEP with a bachelor's degree in philosophy.

== Playing career ==
Phillips played professional football in 2002 and 2003 as a quarterback with the San Diego Riptide of the af2 arena football league.

== Coaching career ==
=== Early coaching career ===
Following his playing career, Phillips returned to his alma mater UTEP, where he spent one season as a student assistant. In 2004, he was hired as quarterbacks coach at West Texas A&M University. In 2005, the Buffaloes went 10–2 and won the Lone Star Conference with an 8–1 mark with NCAA Division II's top-ranked passing offense. Phillips helped guide the development of quarterback Dalton Bell, who was a finalist for the Harlon Hill Trophy. After two seasons, Phillips was then hired for the same position at Baylor in 2006.

=== Dallas Cowboys ===
After his father (Wade) was hired as head coach of the Cowboys in 2007, Wes joined his father's staff as a quality control/offensive assistant coach. Working together for the first time, the coaches Phillips helped the Cowboys to win NFC East titles in 2007 and 2009. But after a 1–7 start in 2010, Wade Phillips was fired. Wes remained in Dallas working under his father's successor Jason Garrett, and was promoted to the position of assistant offensive line coach in 2011 and 2012, before being named tight ends coach for the 2013 season.

=== Washington Redskins ===
In 2014, Phillips joined the Washington Redskins as tight ends coach under new head coach Jay Gruden. It was here that Phillips first began working with Sean McVay, who had preceded Phillips as Washington's tight ends coach before being elevated to offensive coordinator. With the Redskins, Phillips worked with notable tight ends like Vernon Davis and Jordan Reed, the latter of whom made the Pro Bowl following the 2016 season.

=== Los Angeles Rams ===
On February 12, 2019, Phillips joined the Los Angeles Rams as tight ends coach, where he was again reunited with both McVay, now the Rams' head coach, and his father, who was the Rams' defensive coordinator. He remained with the organization in 2020 even though his father did not. In 2021, Phillips added the title of pass game coordinator in addition to his role as tight ends coach. Phillips earned his first Super Bowl ring when the Rams defeated the Cincinnati Bengals in Super Bowl LVI.

=== Minnesota Vikings ===
On February 20, 2022, Phillips was hired by the Minnesota Vikings to serve as the team's offensive coordinator for the 2022 season, working under Vikings head coach and former Rams offensive coordinator Kevin O'Connell.

On April 2, 2024, the Vikings suspended Phillips for the first three weeks of the ensuing season as a repercussion for his 2023 DUI arrest.

On June 13, 2025, Phillips and the Vikings agreed to a contract extension.

== Personal life ==
Wes has been married to his wife Anna since 2009 and they have three children.

On April 4, 1999, Phillips was arrested for public intoxication. On August 1, 2000, Phillips was arrested by UTEP police, and later pled guilty to a drunken driving charge.

On December 8, 2023, Philips was arrested in Minneapolis at approximately 9:45 PM CST on suspicion of drunken driving after showing signs of impairment during a routine traffic stop for speeding, with his blood alcohol content later revealed to be 0.10. He was released early the next morning after posting $300 bond. Three days later, Phillips publicly admitted to driving while drunk and apologized. On February 15, 2024, Phillips pled guilty to an amended misdemeanor charge of careless driving. He paid $378 in fines and was ordered to serve eight hours of community service. On April 2, 2024, the Vikings announced that Phillips would be suspended without pay for three weeks as a result of the conviction, with the ability to return to the team on April 23, 2024.
