= Williamsville North High School =

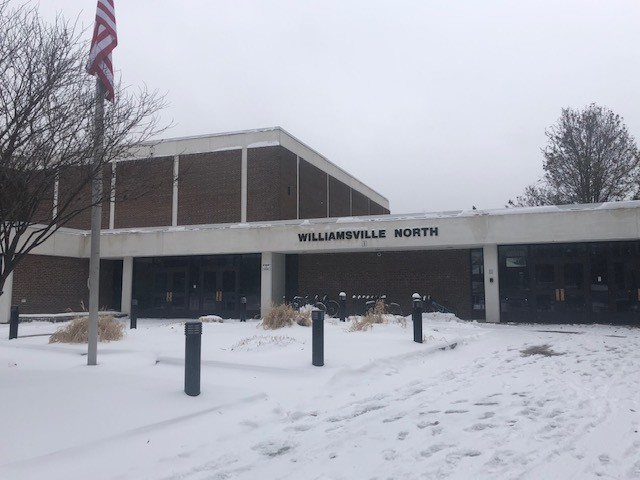

Location
- 1595 Hopkins Road; Williamsville, New York 14221; USA; 43°1′27″N 78°44′13″W

Information
- Type: Public high school
- Motto: Spartans: Learning Today... Leading Tomorrow
- Established: 1968; 58 years ago
- School district: Williamsville Central School District
- NCES District ID: 3631470
- Superintendent: Darren Brown-Hall
- CEEB code: 335983
- NCES School ID: 363147004218
- Principal: Andrew Bowen
- Teaching staff: 117.07 (FTE)
- Grades: 9–12
- Enrollment: 1,307 (2024–2025)
  - Grade 9: 324
  - Grade 10: 296
  - Grade 11: 316
  - Grade 12: 327
  - Other: 44
- Student to teacher ratio: 11.16
- Campus type: Suburban
- Colors: Green and gold
- Nickname: Spartans
- SAT average: 1206
- Newspaper: The Spartan Chronicle
- Yearbook: Olympian
- Website: north.williamsvillek12.org

Williamsville North High School, known locally as "North" or "Will North", is a public high school in the Williamsville Central School District of Williamsville, New York. It is one of three high schools in the district, alongside Williamsville East High School and Williamsville South High School. The school offers a comprehensive program with multi-level instruction in many academic areas. As of 2024, Andrew Bowen has been the principal.

== Admissions ==
The demographic breakdown of the 1,412 students enrolled in 2019–2020 was:

- Male - 739
- Female - 673
- Native American/Alaskan - 4
- Asian/Pacific islanders - 147
- Black - 77
- Hispanic - 57
- White - 1,075
- Multiracial - 50

216 students were eligible for free lunch; 26 were eligible for reduced-price lunch.

== Athletics ==
North's boys' athletic teams are referred to as the Spartans, and the girls' teams as the Lady Spartans.

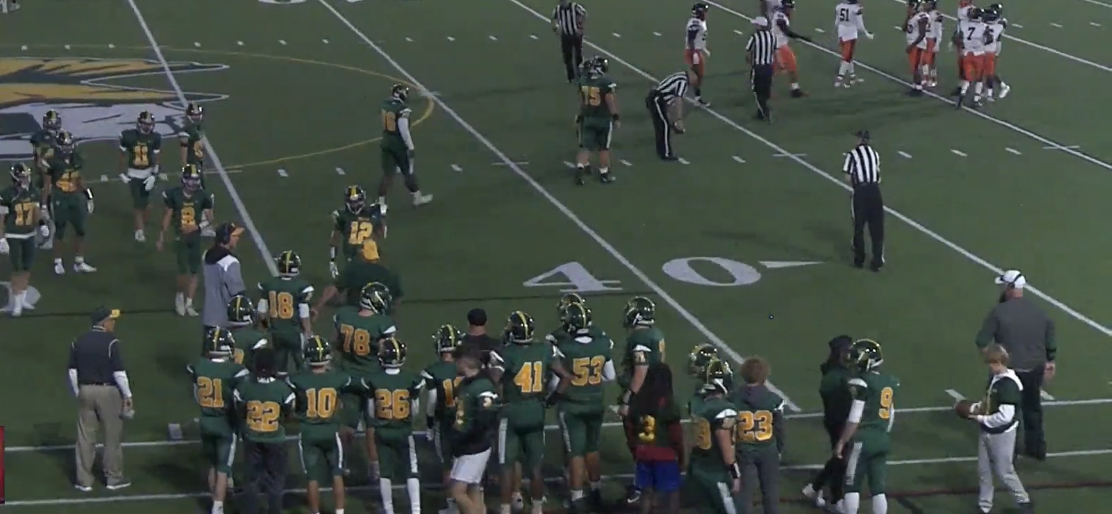
The Williamsville North football team plays a game.

Williamsville North is a member of the ECIC-I athletic conference within Section VI of the New York State Public High School Athletic Association. North fields teams in many sports, in both the girls' and boys' divisions. Boys' sports include football, basketball, baseball, bowling, cross country, golf, ice hockey, lacrosse, gymnastics, wrestling, soccer, swimming and diving, volleyball, and track and field. Girls' sports include cross country, basketball, bowling, golf, field hockey, gymnastics, soccer, softball, volleyball, lacrosse, track and field, soccer, swimming, and diving. The school also offers cheerleading.

The Williamsville North ice hockey program has won multiple Division 1 New York state titles. The team won titles in 2002, 2004, 2006, 2011, and 2017

== Notable alumni ==
- Raven Baxter (2010), science communicator
- Mona Bijoor (1985), businesswoman and internet entrepreneur
- Lynn Schofield Clark (1982), professor of media studies at the University of Denver
- Steve Froehlich, actor
- Chris Gronkowski (2005), American football fullback
- Dan Gronkowski (2003), American football tight end
- Glenn Gronkowski (2011), American football fullback
- Rob Gronkowski, (attended through junior year, did not graduate WNHS) American football tight end
- Chris Hajt (1996), ice hockey defenseman
- Karen Mohlke (1987), biologist human genetics
- Wes Phillips (1997), American football assistant coach
- Jamey Rodemeyer, gay activist
- Peter Salovey (1975), President of Yale University
- David Kim (1979), Concertmaster of the Philadelphia Orchestra
