= Williamsville East High School =

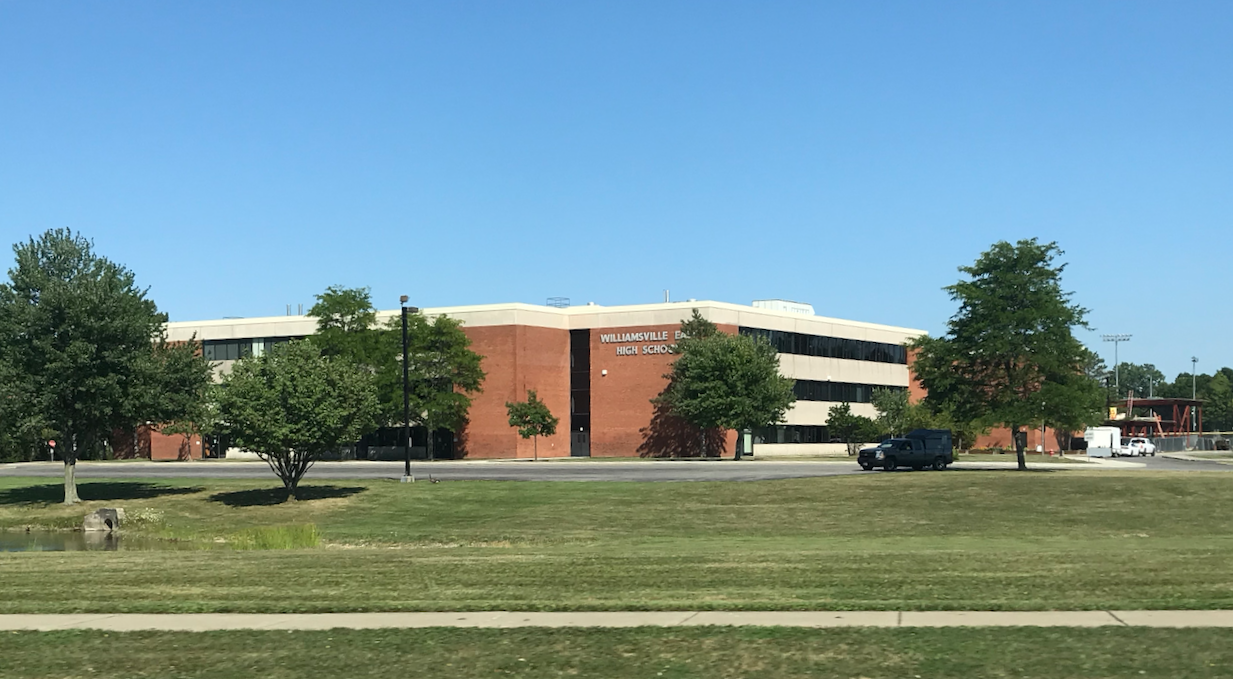

Location
- 151 Paradise Road; East Amherst, New York; United States; 43.00399°N 78.70825°W

Information
- Established: 1975; 51 years ago
- School district: Williamsville Central School District
- Principal: Jason Swenson
- Staff: 78.18 (on an FTE basis)
- Grades: 9–12
- Enrollment: 973 (2023–24)
- Student to teacher ratio: 12.45
- Colors: Red and gold
- Mascot: The Flames
- Newspaper: The East Side
- Yearbook: The Spark
- Website: east.williamsvillek12.org

Williamsville East High School is one of the three high schools located in the Williamsville Central School District in Williamsville, New York. The other two high schools in the district are Williamsville North High School and Williamsville South High School. For the 2016–2017 school year, 1,030 students were enrolled in the school, about the same as the 2004–2005 school year, where 1,048 students were enrolled. In the 2024-2025 school year, the school reported an enrollment of 940 students.

== Music ==
The Rockefeller Philanthropy Advisors donated a $70,000 grant to assist the Williamsville Poetry Music Dance Celebration, begun at Williamsville East in 2000 by band director Dr. Stephen Shewan and English teacher Mr. John Kryder.

== Athletics ==
Established in 1990, East's hockey team went on to win their first state championship in 2004 as part of the New York State Public High School Athletic Association League for hockey.

On November 6, 1985, the boys' gymnastics team set the New York State Public High School Athletic Association Boys' Gymnastics Team competition record, scoring 158.4 points. The record stood unbroken for the entirety of the New York State high school boys' gymnastics history. In 1985 the Williamsville East Boys' Gymnastics also set another record, with 99 wins and 0 losses. Williamsville East was one of four schools left in New York with a boys' team that year. Their boys' gymnastics team finished its 2014 season with a shared sectional title with Williamsville South High School and a 12–0 record.

== Anti-Muslim bullying incident ==
In March 2016, the school came under fire for a racially charged Islamophobic bullying incident.

== Notable alumni ==
- Kazim Ali (1989), poet
- Daniel Lewis Foote, diplomat
- Seth Godin (1978), New York Times bestselling author, entrepreneur
- Joe Mack (2021), professional baseball player
- Todd Marchant, NHL hockey player
- Greg Papa (1980), Professional Sportscaster. Indiana Pacers, Golden State Warriors, San Antonio Spurs, Oakland A's, Oakland Raiders
- Ryan Schmelzer, professional ice hockey player
- John Stevens IV, a finalist on American Idol
- Siva Vaidhyanathan (1984), media historian
