= Julian Schwarz =

American cellist of Austrian descent (born 1991)

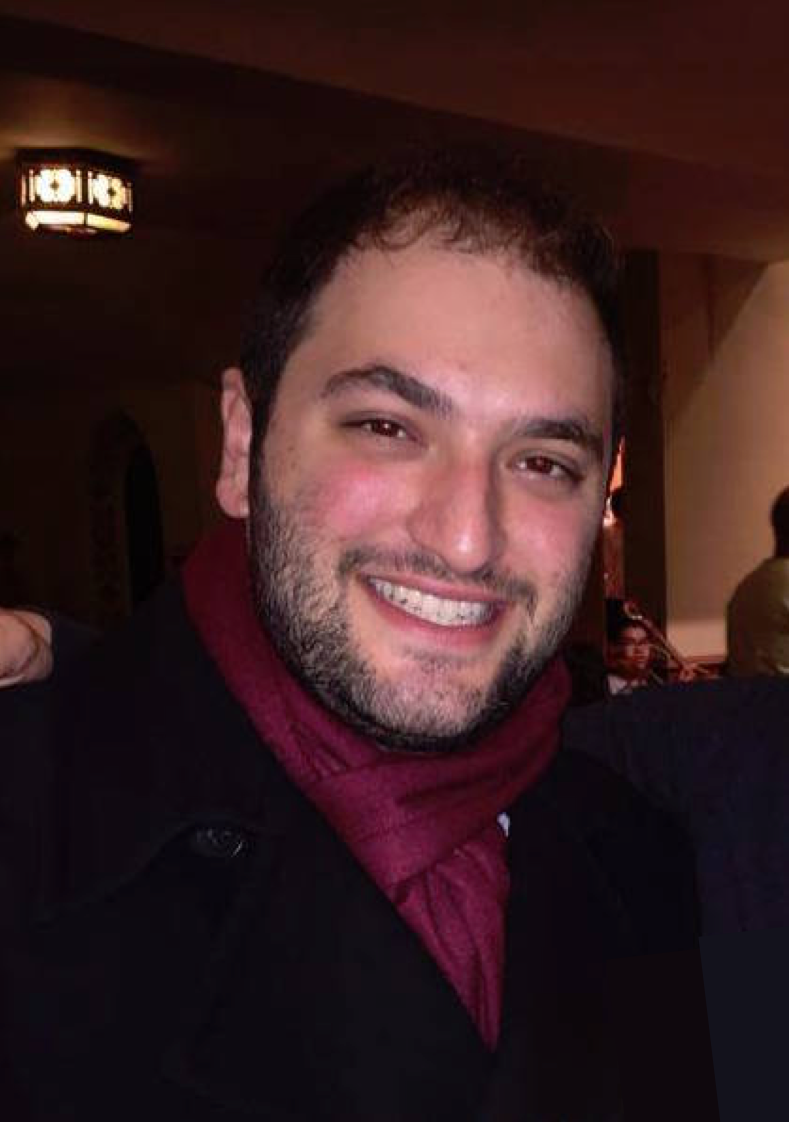

Background information
- Born: January 18, 1991 (age 35); Seattle, Washington
- Origin: Seattle, Washington
- Genres: Classical
- Occupations: Concert cellist and pedagogue
- Instrument: Cello
- Years active: 2002–present
- Website: www.julianschwarz.com

Julian Schwarz (born January 18, 1991) is an American cellist of Austrian descent who graduated from Juilliard School. Schwarz is currently on the cello faculty of Eastern Music Festival and as of August 2017, the assistant professor of cello at Shenendoah Conservatory. He won the 2013 inaugural Alice and Eleonore Schoenfeld International String Competition in Hong Kong and the 2016 Boulder International Chamber Music Competition's "The Art of Duo" with pianist Marika Bournaki, to whom he is married.

== Background ==
Schwarz was born in Seattle, Washington to a musical family, most notably his father, the conductor Gerard Schwarz, and grandfather, former principal viola of the New York Philharmonic, Sol Greitzer. He is one of ten family members to attend Juilliard.

Schwarz began piano lessons at the age of 5 and cello lessons at 6 with the late David Tonkonogui. At 11 years old, he made his orchestral debut with the Seattle Symphony playing Saint-Saëns's Cello Concerto No. 1 with his father, Gerard Schwarz, conducting.

At 18 years old, Schwarz was featured on the cover of the March/April/May 2009 issue of Teen Strings Magazine.

After graduating from the Lakeside School and the Academy of Music Northwest in Seattle, Schwarz attended the Juilliard School earning his Bachelor of Music degree in May 2014. He went on to earn his Master of Music degree from Juilliard in May 2016. His teacher was Joel Krosnick. Schwarz's past teachers include Toby Saks, Lynn Harrell, Neal Cary, and Ronald Leonard.

== Career ==
Schwarz is active in the music community as a solo cellist, conductor, chamber musician, and pedagogue. He is also an active contributor to the Strings Magazine Artist Blog.

=== Cello ===
Schwarz is a cello guest artist with many symphonies across America including Des Moines Symphony, Seattle Symphony, West Virginia Symphony, San Antonio Symphony, and San Diego Symphony, as well as across the world including Queensland, Australia with the Queensland Symphony Orchestra, Hong Kong at the Intimacy of Creativity Festival, and Boca del Rio, Mexico with the Boca del Rio Orchestra. Schwarz has gone on extensive tours including a 15-concert, United States tour with the Moscow State Radio Symphony and a 10-city China tour in March 2017 with pianist, Marika Bournaki. Schwarz and Bournaki are also regular performers at Brooklyn's Bargemusic.

Schwarz performs in festivals across North America and Europe including the Seattle Chamber Music Festival, the Cape Cod Music Festival, and the Verbier Festival in Switzerland.

Schwarz is a faculty member of several festivals and music schools including the cello faculty at Eastern Music Festival, teaching assistant to Joel Krosnick at The Juilliard School, and assistant professor of cello at Shenendoah Conservatory. He has been the artist-in-residence at the pianoSonoma Festival since 2012 and the Lunenburg Academy of Music Performance in Nova Scotia, Canada since 2015.

Schwarz was featured in a PBS special with the All-Star Orchestra performing Samuel Jones's cello concerto, which was written specifically for him. The initial broadcast of the program was in October 2013 and it was also later released as a DVD on Naxos. Schwarz has also premiered works by many other composers including Richard Danielpour, Dobrinka Tabakova, and Marlos Nobre.

Schwarz has appeared on radio features across America including NPR's From the Top, WXXI in Rochester, New York, and Classical King FM 98.1 in Seattle, Washington.

Schwarz currently plays a cello made in Naples by Gennaro Gagliano in 1743.

=== Conducting ===
Schwarz began conducting in a professional capacity in 2007 as the assistant conductor of the Lake Union Civic Orchestra under Christophe Chagnard until 2009. He studied conducting privately with maestro Jorge Mester from 2014 to 2016.

=== Chamber Ensemble ===
Schwarz is currently a member of the Frisson Ensemble, the Mile-End Trio, and the New York Classical Players and has performed on chamber series including the pianoSonoma Festival, Hammond Performing Arts Series, and Frankly Music Chamber Series.

== Awards ==
Year	Event	Rank
2016	Boulder International Chamber Music Competition's "The Art of Duo" with Marika Bournaki	1st
2013	Inaugural Alice and Eleonore Schoenfeld International String Competition in Hong Kong (Professional Cello Division)	1st
2010	Banff International String Quartet Competition (Peresson Quartet)	Semifinalist
2004	David Tonkonogui Memorial Award	

== Discography ==
Year	Album	Label
2015	Bloch "Jewish Life" Suite and Meditation Hebraique with Marika Bournaki	Milken Archive of American Jewish Music
2015	Bruch Kol Nidre with organ with Joseph Adam	Milken Archive of American Jewish Music
2014	All-Star Orchestra Program 6 - Samuel Jones Cello Concerto	Naxos Records
2012	Live Verdi and Mendelssohn Quartets with Peresson Quartet at Montreal International String Quartet Academy	Montreal International String Quartet Academy
2011	EMF 50th Anniversary Collection Vol. 2 - Brahms Double Concerto with Caroline Goulding LIVE	Eastern Music Festival
2011	Saint-Säens and Haydn Cello Concerti with Seattle Symphony	Naxos Records
2008	Gerard Schwarz: In Memoriam	Naxos Records
