= Joe Mack (catcher) =

American baseball player (born 2002)

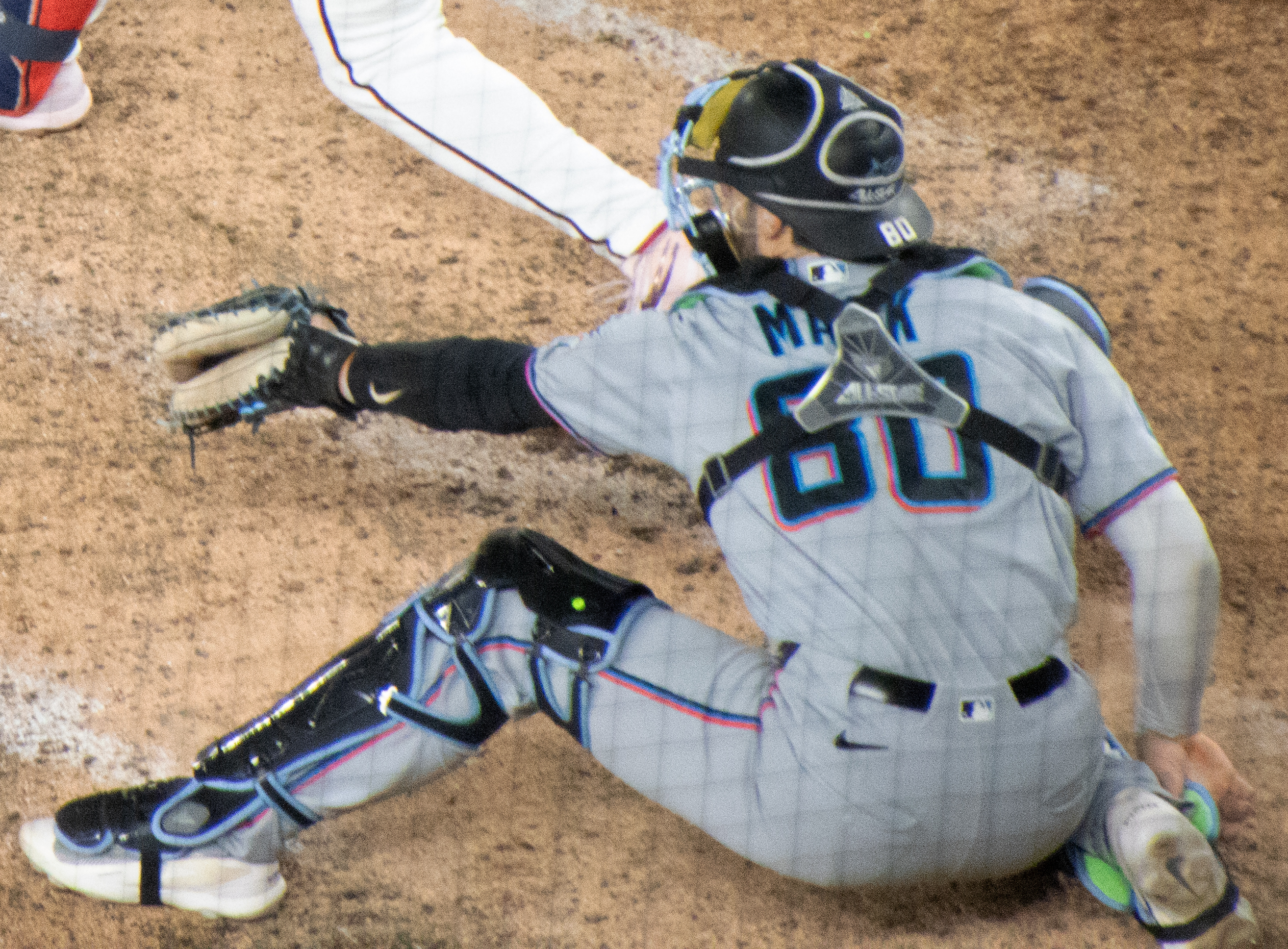
- Mack with the Miami Marlins in 2026

Miami Marlins – No. 80
- Catcher
- Born: December 27, 2002 (age 23); Williamsville, New York, U.S.
- Bats: Left Throws: Right

MLB debut
- May 4, 2026, for the Miami Marlins

MLB statistics (through 2026 season)
- Batting average: .234
- Home runs: 14
- Runs batted in: 52
- Stats at Baseball Reference

Teams
- Miami Marlins (2026–present)

Joseph Allan Mack (born December 27, 2002) is an American professional baseball catcher for the Miami Marlins of Major League Baseball (MLB). He was selected by the Marlins in the first round of the 2021 MLB draft and made his MLB debut in 2026.

== Amateur career ==
Mack grew up in East Amherst, New York, and attended Williamsville East High School. As a sophomore, Mack batted .462 with four home runs and was named All-Western New York. His junior season was canceled due to COVID-19. Mack played in the 2020 Perfect Game All-American Classic. He entered his senior year as the top-ranked baseball player in the state of New York by MaxPreps and as one of the best catching prospects in the 2021 Major League Baseball draft. Mack signed a letter of intent to play college baseball at Clemson. As a senior, he led Williamsville East to the section A-1 championship.

== Professional career ==
Mack was selected with the 31st overall pick in the 2021 Major League Baseball draft by the Miami Marlins. He signed with Miami for a bonus of $2.5 million. Mack made his professional debut with the Rookie-level Florida Complex League Marlins, slashing .132/.373/.208 with one home run, twenty walks, and 22 strikeouts over 53 at-bats.

Mack split the 2022 campaign between the FCL Marlins and the Single-A Jupiter Hammerheads, slashing .243/.383/.385 with five home runs and 15 RBI over 44 total appearances. He spent the 2023 season with the High-A Beloit Sky Carp, hitting .218/.295/.287 with six home runs and 36 RBI across 120 appearances. In 2024, Mack played in 125 games split between Beloit and the Double-A Pensacola Blue Wahoos, batting a cumulative .252/.338/.468 with 24 home runs and 78 RBI.

Mack made 125 appearances for Pensacola and the Triple-A Jacksonville Jumbo Shrimp during the 2025 season, slashing .257/.338/.475 with 21 home runs, 58 RBI, and nine stolen bases. On November 18, 2025, the Marlins added Mack to their 40-man roster to protect him from the Rule 5 draft. Mack was optioned to Triple-A Jacksonville to begin the 2026 season, where he hit .244 with three home runs and nine RBI over 24 appearances.

On May 4, 2026, Mack was promoted to the major leagues for the first time. On June 2, Mack hit his first career home run off of Miles Mikolas of the Washington Nationals. On July 1, he recorded an inside-the-park home run off of Colorado Rockies reliever Juan Mejía.

== Personal life ==
Mack's older brother, Charles, played shortstop at Williamsville East and was selected in the sixth round of the 2018 Major League Baseball draft. His sister, Christy, plays college softball at the University of Hartford.
