= Akira Eguchi =

Japanese pianist

Akira Eguchi is a Japanese pianist. He was trained as a composer at Tokyo National University of Fine Arts and Music and earned his master's degree in piano performance at the Juilliard School. He was the recipient of numerous honors during his time at Juilliard and was awarded a prize for excellence in accompanying at the Henryk Wieniawski Violin Competition.

Akira Eguchi has collaborated with such musicians as Gil Shaham, Anne Akiko Meyers, Catherine Manoukian, Kim Chee Yun, and Kyoko Takezawa and has recorded on the Deutsche Grammophon, Philips, Victor, and BMG labels, as well as on a number of smaller labels. He continues to be active as an arranger and composer.
