= JOOR =

Data analytics company

- Type: Privately held company
- Industry: Wholesale / Technology
- Founded: 2010
- Headquarters: New York, NY, United States
- Key people: Kristin Savilia
- Products: Wholesale / Software
- Website: https://www.joor.com

JOOR is a SaaS company that built an online B2B Marketplace connecting brands and retailers to streamline their wholesale business. JOOR is also a data analytics company.

JOOR has 8,600 brands and 350,000 retailers on the platform. Al Tayer was the 28th retail company on the Joor Pro system. Global in scope, JOOR clients include Neiman Marcus and Kate Spade and Balenciaga. The company has 250 employees including 100 in New York City. Others in sales and customer support roles are in Paris, Madrid, London, Milan, Melbourne, Philadelphia and Los Angeles.

When Kristin Savilia stepped into the CEO shoes at JOOR, the tech team only included two females, which represented less than five percent of the team. Eighteen short months later, the JOOR tech organization (Engineering, Product and Quality Assurance) is 33% women, well exceeding the industry average of 13.5%.

In February 2019, the company raised a Series C round, where it also reported that Joor’s platform has netted $23 billion in gross merchandise volume across 3.68 million orders. Nearly half of these orders were placed and processed in the last 12 months.

In September 2019, JOOR announced the acquisition of B2B wholesale technology Veee, as well as a strategic partnership with Premium Group, a fashion trade show organizer in Europe.

== Products ==
Online marketplace with dedicated brand and retailer accesses and customisable profiles, allowing them to transact online. iPad Applications on iOS for brands and retailers. 360º product imagery in partnership with ORDRE (called "ORB360"). Payment management solution (called "JOOR PAY"). Custom reports suite.

Joor has also launched “Snapshot,” a tool that gives brands a live view of how their wholesale businesses are trending. Brands can access such information as best-selling styles, their top-volume retailers and wholesale volumes. Additional functions will be added. This type of data visualization helps brands to understand key metrics around their wholesale business.

JOOR's clients include Bergdorf Goodman and Neiman Marcus in New York and Harrods in London, as well as the conglomerates LVMH, Kering, Richemont, VF Corporation, Kate Spade, and Kellwood Company.

== Funding ==
JOOR has raised $20.5 million in venture funding since 2010, including a $15 million Series B funding round led by Canaan Partners in July 2013. Other investors include Battery Ventures, Advance Publications, Lerer Ventures, Great Oaks Venture Capital, Landis Capital, and Forerunner Ventures.

In February 2019 the company closed a $16 million in series C funding as it looks to add more tools to its platform and expand operations in Asia.

== Awards ==
Inc. named JOOR as one of their "Companies to Watch," and Fast Company named JOOR one of the "10 Most Innovative Companies in Fashion". In 2014, Internet Week named JOOR one of the 30 best places to work in New York City Tech.
