= Williamsville South High School =

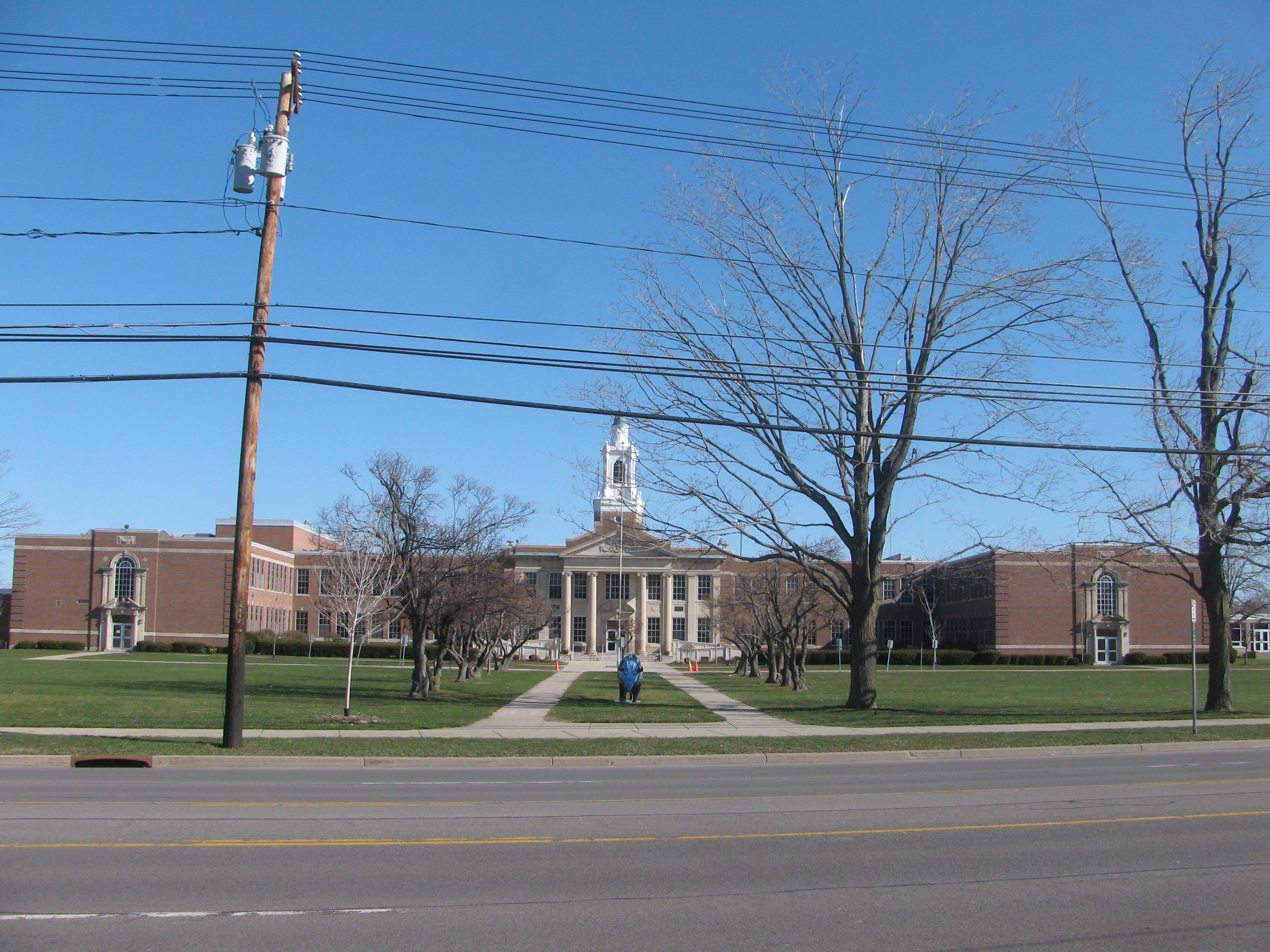

Location
- 5950 Main St; Williamsville, New York; United States; 42.9664°N 78.73159°W

Information
- Established: 1892; 134 years ago
- School district: Williamsville Central School District
- Principal: Keith Boardman
- Faculty: 73.95 (FTE)
- Grades: 9 - 12
- Enrollment: 857 (2022-23)
- Student to teacher ratio: 11.59
- Colors: Blue and white
- Team name: Billies
- Newspaper: Out of the Blue
- Yearbook: Searchlight
- Website: south.williamsvillek12.org
- Williamsville Junior and Senior High School
- U.S. National Register of Historic Places
- Built: 1950
- Architect: Duane Lyman
- Architectural style: Colonial Revival
- NRHP reference No.: 08000407
- Added to NRHP: May 12, 2008

Williamsville South High School is a high school located in Williamsville, New York, a suburb of Buffalo, New York. South is one of three high schools in the Williamsville Central School District, along with Williamsville North High School and Williamsville East High School.

== History ==
=== Origins, 1853–1892 ===
In 1853, the Williamsville Classical Institute was formed as a private school to provide education in Williamsville beyond the elementary level. The property on Academy Street was purchased for $700. The first catalog was published in 1857, but the Williamsville Classical Institute (which had become known as the "Academy") eventually closed in 1869. In 1874, School District No. 3 rented the building for use as an elementary school.

=== Academy Street School, 1892–1950 ===
Union Free School District No. 3 was organized on May 7, 1892. The Board of Education purchased the property and building from the Institute for $250, naming it Union Free School No. 3, and added a high school program. The first Regents exams were held there in 1892 and its first graduating class consisted of five students in 1895. The first principals were George E. Smith, W. M. Pierce, and D.B. Albert, who had five assistants in 1898. By 1902, there were 65 high school students and 143 in the elementary program.

By 1921, the original red brick building had been condemned by the State Department of Education as antiquated and unsanitary. The public voted to demolish the old building and rebuild at the same site for a cost of $122,000. The new building was opened in 1924, although the auditorium was completed in time for the graduation of the Class of 1923. A large addition was built in 1931 and the curriculum was enlarged.

After the opening of the current building on Main Street on September 11, 1950, the 1920s-era Academy Street building continued in use as an elementary school for a time, and eventually also a middle school. In 1981, the Christian Central Academy rented the then-vacant Academy Street School, eventually purchasing the property from the Williamsville Central School District in 1985. In 1991, the Williamsville Historical Society declared and marked that location as an historic site.

=== Williamsville High School ===
Due to rapid growth and expansion, the Williamsville Central School District was formed and a new location was needed for the middle and high school students. The current building on Main Street was constructed for an approved cost of $2.5 million, and opened as Williamsville Junior-Senior High School on September 11, 1950, serving grades 7-12 and was dedicated on April 15, 1951. The building was re-designated as Williamsville Senior High following the opening of Mill Middle School (originally Williamsville Junior High School) on September 9, 1959, and finally as South High following the opening of North High School in 1968.

The building was designed by acclaimed local architect Duane Lyman, who was known as the dean of Western New York architecture. Its construction features classic columns and a traditional clock tower. A science wing was added to the building's east side in 1961, and a new athletics wing was added to the north side in 1992. An remodeled and expanded music wing was completed in 2021. The building was added to the National Register of Historic Places (as "Williamsville Junior and Senior High School") in 2008.

== Education ==
=== Advanced Placement courses ===
Williamsville South has long been an active participant in the Advanced Placement program. In 1998, Newsweek issued its first ranking of American high schools, based on a calculation of AP exam participation in May 1996 per enrolled student, with Williamsville South ranking 63rd in the country. The school's rank has fallen in subsequent years as AP participation has expanded nationwide, but its rank of 974 in Newsweek's 2010 list still places it among the top 5 percent of all U.S. public high schools.

== Extracurricular activities ==
=== Athletics ===
The school's football team finished with the #1 ranking in New York State in 1984, during an era prior to the establishment of a state tournament. In 1994, the football team advanced to the New York State championship game (Class B), but was defeated by one point.

The school's softball team has won four New York State championships, in 2000 (Class B), 2004, 2006, and 2014 (Class A). These are Williamsville South's first-ever New York State tournament championships in any team sport to appear in the New York State Sportswriters Association records.

Soon afterward, the girls volleyball team won the state championship in 2014 (Class B), and the girls basketball team won the state championship in 2015 (Class A).

== Notable alumni ==
- Neil Abercrombie, Class of 1955 (Williamsville Central HS), Governor of Hawaii, 2010–14, member of the United States House of Representatives from Hawaii, 1991-2010
- Elizabeth M. Allen, Class of 2002, political advisor and former Under Secretary of State for Public Diplomacy and Public Affairs.
- Marty Angelo, Class of 1965, pastor and founder of Marty Angelo Ministries, Author "Once Life Matters: A New Beginning", "Vision of New Jerusalem: Now"
- Jacob Artist, Class of 2010, actor, best known for role on Glee
- Justin Bailey, Class of 2013, hockey player for the Buffalo Sabres in the NHL
- Alfred F. Beiter, Class of (c. 1907–08) (Williamsville HS), member of the United States House of Representatives from New York, 1933–39 & 1941–43
- Jim Dombrowski, Class of 1981, professional football player for the New Orleans Saints
- Sam Castronova, Class of 2015, professional football player
- Robert Kinkel, founding member of Trans-Siberian Orchestra
- Joe Licata, Class of 2011, NFL and current Williamsville South football head coach
- Wendie Malick, Class of 1969, actress
- Joyce Carol Oates, Class of 1956 (Williamsville Central HS), award-winning author and professor of English at Princeton University
- Jon Ralston, Class of 1977, political journalist known nationally for prediction and analysis of Nevada elections
- John B. Sheffer II Class of 1966, Mayor of Williamsville, New York Assemblyman and New York State Senator
- Lindsay Shookus, Class of 1998, Emmy Award-winning television producer of Saturday Night Live.
- Carol Wincenc, Class of 1967 (Williamsville HS), nationally prominent flutist and professor of flute at The Juilliard School
- Faith Whittlesey, Class of 1956 (Williamsville Central HS), Assistant to the President for Public Liaison under Ronald Reagan and a United States Ambassador to Switzerland
