= Somei Satoh =

Japanese composer (born 1947)

Somei Satoh 佐藤 聰明
- Born: January 19, 1947; Sendai, Miyagi, Japan
- Occupation: Composer

Somei Satoh (佐藤 聰明, Satō Sōmei; born January 19, 1947 in Sendai, Japan) is a Japanese composer of contemporary music.

== Style ==
Satoh’s compositions mix Japanese court music with European romanticism and electronic music.

== Career ==
His musical career began with an experimental, mix media group called "Tone Field" in Tokyo. He studied at Nihon University of Art in the early 1970s and is primarily self-taught in composition. In 1972 and 1981, Satoh produced two other experimental projects. The latter involved placing eight speakers approximately one kilometer apart on nearby mountain tops overlooking a huge valley. In 1985, he collaborated with theater designer Manuel Luetgenhorst to stage his music at The Arts at St. Ann's in Brooklyn, New York.

He wrote his violin concerto for Anne Akiko Meyers.

== Compositions ==
Orchestra

- Sumeru (1982)
- Homa (1988)
- Ruika (1990)
- Toward the Night (1991)
- Glimmering Darkness (1995)
- Kami no Miuri (1995)
- Burning Meditation (1995)
- Listening to Fragrances of the Dusk (1997)
- Firefly Garden (1998)
- Kisetsu (1999)
- From the Depth of Silence (2000)
- Kyokoku (2000)
- Violin Concerto (2002)

Vocal music

- Stabat Mater (1987)

Works using Japanese musical instruments

- Chinmoku (Silence) (1977)
- Kaze no Kyoku (Music of the Winds) (1979)
- Ki No Koe (Voice of Tree) (1982)
- Kamu Ogui Goto (1989)
- Kougetsu KOUGETSU (1990)
- Snayou (1991)
- Tamaogi Koto (1994)
- Hi No Kyoku (1996)
- Usuzumi (2004)

Chamber music

- Litania (1973)
- Hymn for the Sun (1973)
- Kagami (Mirror) (1975)
- Cosmic Womb (1975)
- Incarnation II (1978)
- The Heavenly Spheres are Illuminated by Lights (1979)
- Birds in Warped Time II (1980)
- Hoshi No Mon (A Gate into the Stars) (1982)
- Kaze No Kyoku II (Music of the Winds II) (1984)
- Hikari (Light) (1986)
- Toki No Mon (A Gate into Infinity) (1988)
- Shun-Shu-Ka (Lament for Spring) (1989)
- Lanzarote (1993)
- Incarnation I (1977)
- Uzu (Vortex) (1988)
- Recitative (1991)
- Innocence (1996)
- Choral (2000)
- Bifu (2013)

Electronic music

- Emerald Tablet (1978)
- Mandara (1982)
- Mantra (1986)
- Tantra (1990)

== Awards ==
- Japan Arts Festival, 1980
- Asian Cultural Council, 1983
