= Williamsville Central School District =

School district in Erie County, New York

Williamsville Central School District (commonly abbreviated WCSD) is a public school district in New York that serves the village of Williamsville, as well as the towns of Amherst, Cheektowaga, and Clarence. The district enrollment is approximately 10,600 students throughout 13 schools in the district. The district superintendent is Dr. Darren Brown-Hall. It is headquartered near Casey Middle School and North High School at 105 Casey Rd, East Amherst, NY 14051. The district also has an active technology distribution drive which provides all middle schoolers with Chromebooks.

== Schools ==
=== Elementary school ===
Elementary schools cover kindergarten to Grade 4.

- Country Parkway Elementary School (Opened in September 1968. Dedicated on March 23, 1969. Cornerstone laid on October 9, 1970)
- Dodge Elementary School (Opened in September 1953 as North Elementary School and dedicated on April 25, 1954)
- Forest Elementary School (Opened on September 6, 1956, as West Elementary School and dedicated on May 12, 1957)
- Heim Elementary School (Opened in 1966 and dedicated on November 9, 1969)
- Maple East Elementary School (Opened on September 9, 1959, as Maple Elementary School and dedicated on April 3, 1960)
- Maple West Elementary School (Opened in 1966 and dedicated on March 22, 1970)

=== Middle school ===
Middle schools cover Grade 5 to grade 8.

- Casey Middle School (Opened on September 14, 1970. Cornerstone laid on October 9, 1970. Dedicated on April 25, 1971)
- Heim Middle School (Opened on September 8, 1965, as Heim Rd. Junior High School and dedicated on March 20, 1966)
- Mill Middle School (Opened on September 9, 1959, as Williamsville Junior High School and dedicated on April 29, 1960)
- Transit Middle School (Opened on September 8, 1993, and dedicated on November 14, 1993)

=== High school ===
High schools cover grade 9 to grade 12.

- Williamsville East High School (Opened on September 3, 1975, and dedicated on February 8, 1976)
- Williamsville North High School (Opened in September 1968. Dedicated on June 8, 1969. Cornerstone laid on October 9, 1970)
- Williamsville South High School (Opened on September 11, 1950, and dedicated on April 15, 1951)

== Additional Info ==
The entire district utilizes an online information tracking system called WITS (an abbreviation for Williamsville Information Tracking System) which is used by students, parents, teachers, and other staff to track student grades, clubs, events, class-specific documents and student-teacher/parent-teacher communication. Additionally, students are able to take quizzes and tests on the website, in which they will be automatically graded when they finish taking the quiz/test.

A Williamsville Central School District principal, Dr. Daniel Walh, (principal of Transit Middle School) was named 2021 New York State Secondary School Principal of the Year by the School Administrators Association of New York State.

=== Ranking ===
- Top district out of 97 public school districts in western NY, 2012.
- Williamsville East, South, North High schools awarded gold, silver medals in 2012 U.S. News Best High Schools, ranking 57th, 86th, 88th out of 1165 in the state respectively. These 3 high schools rank among the top 2-3% out of 21,776 public high schools nationally; 2012.
