= Gerard Schwarz =

American symphony conductor and trumpeter

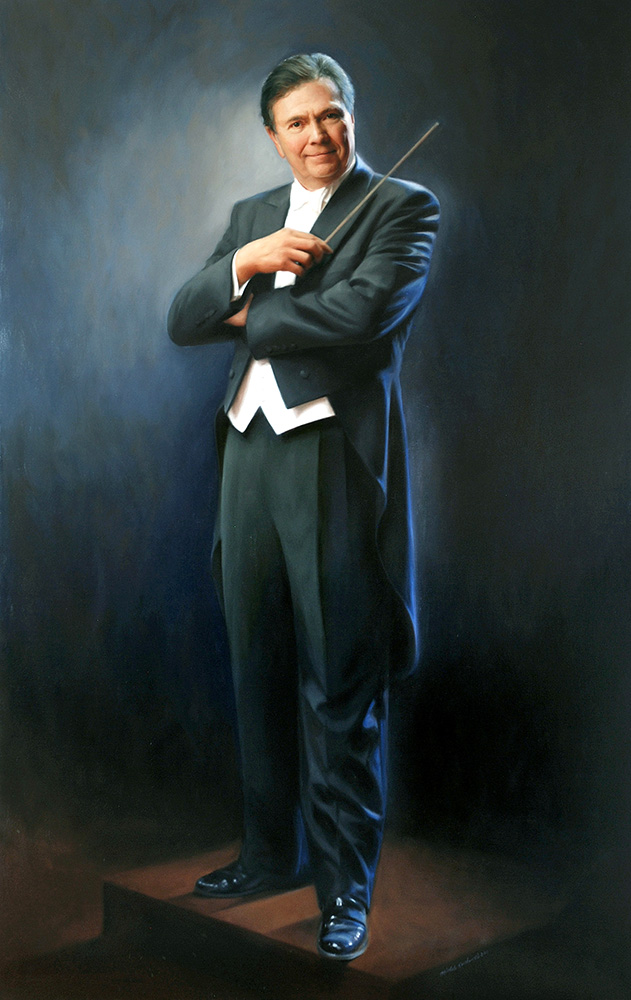
Portrait painting of Gerard Schwarz by artist Michele Rushworth, oil on canvas, 80" x 50", Benaroya Hall, Seattle

Gerard Schwarz (born August 19, 1947), also known as Gerry Schwarz or Jerry Schwarz, is an American symphony conductor and trumpeter. As of 2019, Schwarz serves as the artistic and music director of Palm Beach Symphony and the director of orchestral activities and music director of the Frost Symphony Orchestra at the Frost School of Music at the University of Miami.

== Early life ==
Schwarz was born in Weehawken, New Jersey, to Jewish parents. His parents were both physicians and took him to concerts and opera performances. Schwarz began his trumpet career at age 8. By 12 years of age, he dedicated his life to becoming a musician. He graduated from New York City's High School of Performing Arts and the Juilliard School of Music In addition, he completed studies in composition with Paul Creston in the early 1960s. He began his musical career as a trumpeter, performing until 1977 as co-principal of the New York Philharmonic under Pierre Boulez. He began conducting in 1966.

Schwarz champions American composers, past and present. He has made more than 100 recordings with the Seattle Symphony including many American works. In particular, he won acclaim for his recordings of symphonies and orchestral works by Walter Piston, Howard Hanson, William Schuman, Alan Hovhaness, and David Diamond.

Schwarz built the strength of the Seattle Symphony. In 1983 it had 5,000 subscribers; as of 2008 it had 35,000. He spearheaded the effort to build Benaroya Hall for the symphony. However, his leadership style of the Seattle Symphony was controversial among some musicians. A portrait painting of Schwarz by artist Michele Rushworth was unveiled and installed at Benaroya Hall in 2011.

== Career ==
In 1971 he won the Young Concert Artists International Auditions.

He frequently held multiple positions simultaneously. He was music director of the Los Angeles Chamber Orchestra from 1978 to 1986.

He served as music director of New York's Mostly Mozart Festival from 1982 to 2001. He was the music director of the Seattle Symphony from 1985 to 2011.

From 2001 to 2006, Schwarz was music director of the Royal Liverpool Philharmonic Orchestra (RLPO). He served as music director of the New York Chamber Symphony and music advisor to Tokyo's Orchard Hall in conjunction with the Tokyo Philharmonic.

In 2007, Schwarz was named music director of the Eastern Music Festival in North Carolina, having served as its principal conductor since 2005. He expanded the festival's audience to the largest in its history, enhanced education and programming to include a composer in residence and three new concert series and increased collaboration with An Appalachian Summer Festival, where he is artistic partner for symphonic music programming.

=== Recordings ===
Among the orchestras that Schwarz has led on his other recordings are the Czech Philharmonic, the Philadelphia Orchestra, the Tokyo Philharmonic Orchestra, the Berlin Radio Symphony Orchestra, and the Orchestre National de France. In 2003 he recorded two concertos by Philip Glass: the Cello Concerto (with Julian Lloyd Webber) and the Concerto for Two Timpanists (with Evelyn Glennie and Jonathan Haas with the RLPO).

He recorded all of Mahler's symphonies and Richard Strauss's tone poems with the RLPO.

As a trumpet soloist, Schwarz has recorded the concertos of Joseph Haydn and Johann Nepomuk Hummel for Delos.

In 2011, the block around Benaroya Hall was named "Gerard Schwarz Place."

=== Discography ===
- Judith Blegen and Frederica von Stade: Songs, Arias and Duets, with the Chamber Music Society of Lincoln Center, Columbia, 1975

== Awards ==
- Ditson Conductor's Award for his commitment to the performance of American music. (1989)
- Musical America's Conductor of the Year (1994) He was the first American to win that award
- 14 Grammy nominations
- 4 Emmy awards (of 5 nominations) for his performance of Mozart's Requiem on Live from Lincoln Center and performances with the Seattle Symphony on PBS.
- Seattle City of Music Outstanding Achievement Award (2010).

== Personal life ==
Gerard Schwarz married Jody (née Greitzer) in June 1984. He has four children, including cellist Julian Schwarz.
