= All-Star Orchestra =

Orchestral music project

All-Star Orchestra is an orchestral music project created by Gerard Schwarz, former music director and conductor laureate of Seattle Symphony. It is a television and DVD project, filmed by 18 high definition video cameras without an audience for PBS, the Khan Academy, educators, students, "and enthusiasts." Mr Schwarz assembled 95 leading orchestral musicians, of major symphony orchestras, from across the United States. The assembled players performed over a four-day period. In 2014, the program consisted of eight episodes. The second season began broadcast in the fall of 2015. The organization's web site provides details of the second season's programs.

The first part of the program consists of Stravinsky's The Firebird, Beethoven's Fifth Symphony, Ravel's Daphnis et Chloé Suite No. 2, Shostakovich's Symphony No. 5 and Brahms's Intermezzo in A.

== Represented cities ==
Approximately fifty percent of the musicians were chosen from the Philadelphia Orchestra, Boston Symphony Orchestra, the Chicago Symphony Orchestra, the National Symphony Orchestra, the Seattle Symphony, the Houston Symphony, the Tulsa Symphony, the Minnesota Orchestra, the Pittsburgh Symphony Orchestra, the Richmond Symphony Orchestra, the San Francisco Symphony, the Cincinnati Symphony Orchestra, the New Jersey Symphony Orchestra and others. The other fifty percent were chosen from the New York area; the Metropolitan Opera, the New York Philharmonic, the Orpheus, the Orchestra of St. Luke's and New York City Opera.

Selected prominent musicians represented orchestras based in Boston, Chicago, Cincinnati, Cleveland, Dallas, Detroit, Hartford, Houston, Jacksonville, Los Angeles, Minneapolis, Nashville, New York, Newark, Philadelphia, Pittsburgh, Portland, Salt Lake City, San Francisco, Seattle, the Tampa Bay Area, and Washington, D.C.
