= Piano Trio No. 2 (Schubert) =

1827 musical composition in E-flat major

Piano Trio
- No. 2
- by Franz Schubert
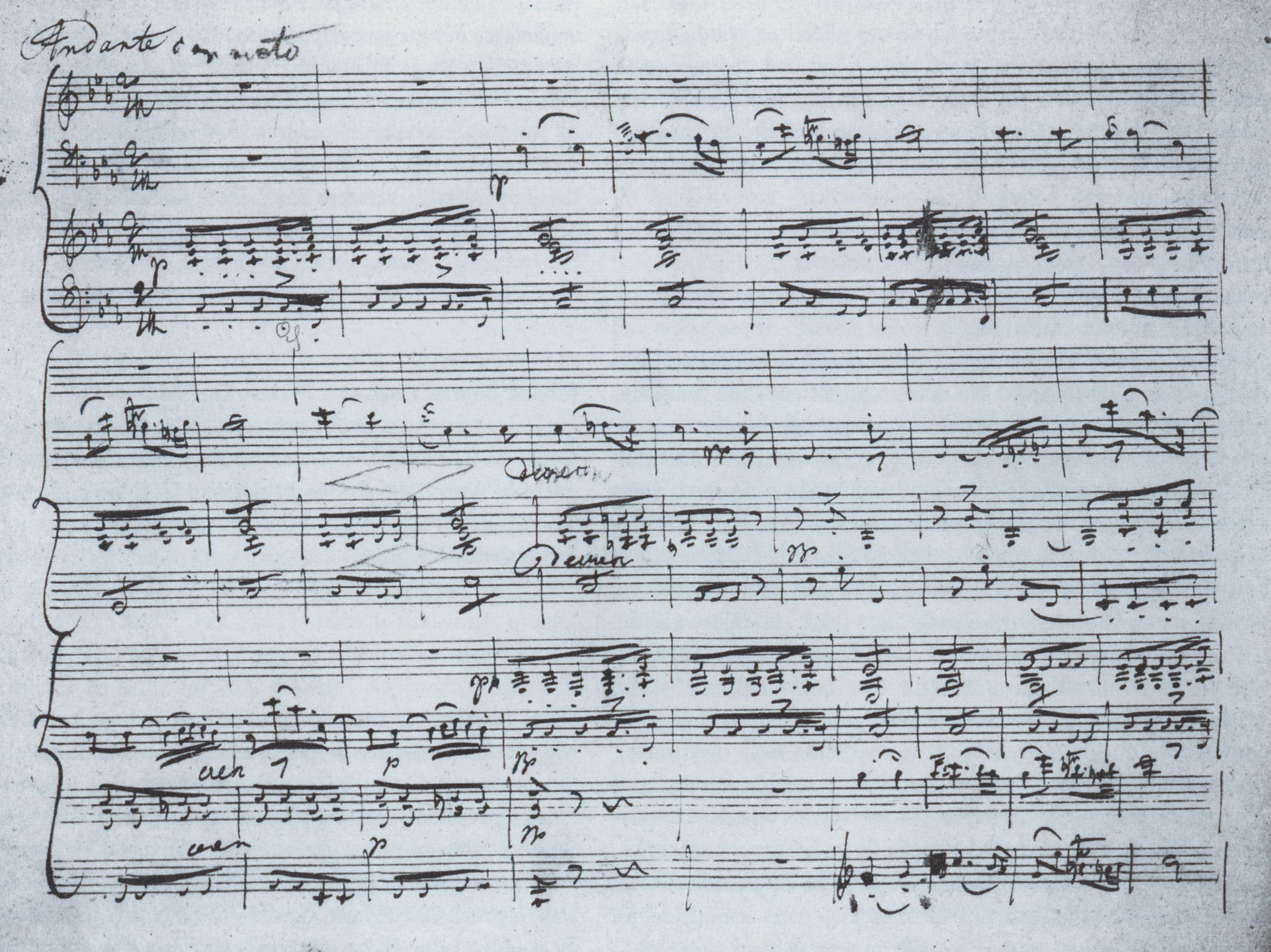
- Autograph of the second movement
- Key: E♭ major
- Catalogue: D. 929
- Composed: 1827
- Published: 1828
- Duration: 50 minutes
- Movements: 4

The Piano Trio No. 2 in E♭ major for piano, violin, and cello, D 929, was one of the last compositions completed by Franz Schubert, dated November 1827. It was published by Probst as Opus 100 in late 1828, shortly before the composer's death and first performed at a private party in January 1828 to celebrate the engagement of Schubert's school-friend Josef von Spaun. The Trio was among the few of his late compositions Schubert heard performed before his death. It was given its first private performance by Carl Maria von Bocklet on the piano, Ignaz Schuppanzigh playing the violin, and Josef Linke playing cello.

Like Schubert's other piano trio, this is a comparatively larger work than most piano trios of the time, taking almost 50 minutes to perform. The second theme of the first movement is based loosely on the opening theme of the Minuet and Trio of Schubert's G major sonata (D. 894). Scholar Christopher H. Gibbs asserts direct evidence of Beethoven's influence on the Trio.

The main theme of the second movement was used as one of the central musical themes in Stanley Kubrick's 1975 film Barry Lyndon. It has also been used in a number of other films, including The Hunger, Crimson Tide, The Piano Teacher, L'Homme de sa vie, Land of the Blind, Recollections of the Yellow House, The Way He Looks, The Mechanic, Miss Julie, The Congress, the HBO miniseries John Adams, the FX miniseries Mrs. America, two episodes of American Crime Story, as the opening piece for the ABC documentary The Killing Season, used throughout the BBC documentary Auschwitz: The Nazis and 'The Final Solution', and in the 2023 biographical film, Dance First, about Irish playwright Samuel Beckett.

The autograph has been preserved since 1955 in a private collection in Switzerland.

== Structure ==
The piano trio contains four movements:

=== I. Allegro ===
The first movement is in sonata form. There is disagreement over the break-up of thematic material with one source claiming six separate units of thematic material while another source divides them into three themes each with two periods. There is to an extent extra thematic material during the recapitulation. At least one of the thematic units is based closely on the opening theme of the third movement of the earlier Piano Sonata in G major, D 894. The development section focuses mainly on the final theme of the exposition.

=== II. Andante con moto ===
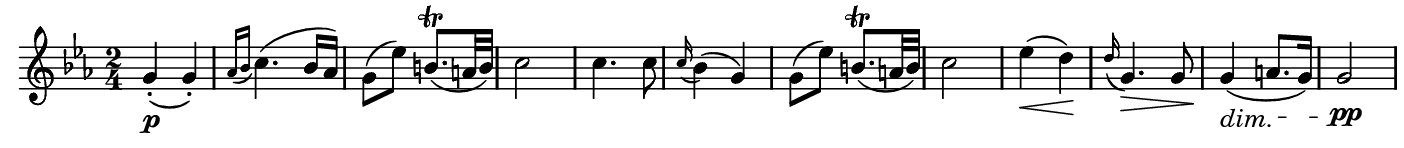
Principal theme in the second movement

The second movement takes an asymmetrical double ternary form. The principal theme is inspired by the Swedish folk song Se solen sjunker, which the composer had heard in the Fröhlich sisters' house, sung by the tenor Isak Albert Berg.

=== III. Scherzo: Allegro moderato ===
The scherzo is an animated piece in standard double ternary form.

=== IV. Allegro moderato ===
The finale is in sonata rondo form. Schubert also includes in two interludes the opening theme of the second movement in an altered version. Schubert also made some cuts in this finale, one of which includes the second-movement theme combined contrapuntally with other material from the finale.

== Discography ==
- Rudolf Serkin, Adolf Busch and Hermann Busch, 1935.
- Leonard Rose, Isaac Stern and Eugene Istomin, 1969.
- George Janzer, Arthur Grumiaux and Eva Czako.
- Maurice Gendron, Yehudi Menuhin and Hephzibah Menuhin.
- Beaux Arts Trio (Menahem Pressler, Daniel Guilet and Bernard Greenhouse), 1966.
- The Mozartean Players (Steven Lubin, Stanley Ritchie and Myron Lutzke), 1992 (played on period instruments, both versions of the last movement).
- Anner Bylsma, Vera Beths and Jos van Immerseel, 1996 (played on period instruments).
- Vladimir Ashkenazy, Pinchas Zukerman, and Lynn Harrell, 1997.
- Imogen Cooper, Raphael Oleg and Sonia Wieder-Atherton, 2002.
- Trio Wanderer (Vincent Coq, Jean-Marc Phillips-Varjabédian and Raphaël Pidoux).
- Trio Dali (Jack Liebeck, Christian-Pierre La Marca and Amandine Savary), 2011.
- Viviana Sofronitsky, László Paulik, Sergei Istomin, 2011 (played on period instruments).
- Trio Gaspard (Jonian Ilias Kadesha, Vashti Hunter, Nicholas Rimmer), Live in Berlin, 2018.
- Trio Marie Soldat (Cecilia Bernardini, Keiko Shichijo and Marcus van den Munckhof), 2019 (played on period instruments).
- Erich Höbarth, Alexander Rudin, Aapo Häkkinen, 2019 (played on period instruments).
- Busch Trio (Mathieu van Bellen, Ori Epstein and Omri Epstein), 2020.
- Noah Bendix-Balgley, Peter Wiley, and Robert Levin (both versions of the last movement).
- Christian Tetzlaff, Tanja Tetzlaff, and Lars Vogt, 2023.
