= Guarneri Quartet =

American string quartet

The Guarneri Quartet in 2001. Retiring cellist David Soyer (seated L) passes the bow to incoming cellist Peter Wiley, as John Dalley, Arnold Steinhardt, and Michael Tree (standing L–R) look on.

The Guarneri Quartet was an American string quartet founded in 1964 at the Marlboro Music School and Festival. It was admired for its rich, warm, complex tone and its bold, dramatic interpretations of the quartet literature, with a particular affinity for the works of Beethoven and Bartók. Through teaching at Harpur College (which became Binghamton University), University of Maryland, Curtis Institute of Music, and at Marlboro, the Guarneri players helped nurture interest in quartet playing for a generation of young musicians. The group's extensive touring and recording activities, coupled with its outreach efforts to engage audiences, contributed to the rapid growth in the popularity of chamber music during the 1970s and 1980s. The quartet is notable for its longevity: the group performed for 45 years with only one personnel change, when cellist David Soyer retired in 2001 and was replaced by his student Peter Wiley. The Guarneri Quartet disbanded in 2009.

== Musicians ==
1st violin

Arnold Steinhardt (b. Los Angeles, 1 April 1937) Steinhardt is the elder of two sons born to music-loving Polish parents. He began studying the violin at age 6, and when he was 17 he entered Curtis Institute of Music in Philadelphia as a pupil of Ivan Galamian. Prior to the founding of the Guarneri Quartet, Steinhardt spent four years as assistant concertmaster of the Cleveland Orchestra under George Szell; he spent summers at the Marlboro Music Festival and in 1962 he studied in Switzerland with Joseph Szigeti.

Steinhardt is 6 feet 3 inches (1.91 m) tall, and as a result he has unusually long arms, which has made it necessary to adjust his playing posture to avoid pain. He is outgoing and articulate, and has written two books. (Note: In addition to Indivisible by Four: A String Quartet in Pursuit of Harmony (see Resources), Steinhardt has written Violin Dreams (Houghton Mifflin Harcourt, 2008).) When touring with the quartet, he liked to browse in antique shops, and he particularly collected old locks. Since the Guarneri’s dissolution he has maintained a blog containing his personal reflections and reminiscences (see External links).

2nd violin

John Dalley (b. Madison, Wisconsin, 1 June 1936) Dalley’s parents were both musicians, and he started violin lessons at the age of 4. He spent summers at Interlochen National Music Camp, and in his teens he went to Tuscaloosa to study at the University of Alabama with Ottokar Čadek. At 18, he enrolled at Curtis Institute, working with Efrem Zimbalist. Following graduation from Curtis, Dalley taught at Oberlin Conservatory of Music, and later played alongside David Soyer in a group known as the American String Quartet.

Dalley is thoughtful and affable, with a dry wit and occasional bursts of outright clowning; but he was the most introverted of the Guarneri musicians, often skipping post-concert social events and disappearing immediately after a concert. (Note: Steinhardt claims that he learned to forge Dalley’s signature so that fans could have all four names on a signed program.) Dalley is a skilled maker of bows for stringed instruments; he would sometimes carry the necessary equipment on the road, so that he could work on a bow in his hotel room, while the others might be attending a reception following a performance.

Viola

Michael Tree (b. Newark NJ, 19 Feb 1935; d. New York, 30 Mar 2018) Tree was the son of Samuel Applebaum, a respected violin teacher and the author of several books on technique. He started lessons with his father at age 5, and entered Curtis Institute at the unusually young age of 12. He studied with Leah Luboshutz, Veda Reynolds, and ultimately with Efrem Zimbalist. Following his graduation, Tree made a successful debut at Carnegie Hall and toured internationally as a violin soloist, playing with a number of orchestras. In 1959 he began spending summers at Marlboro, where he met David Soyer and played with him and pianist Anton Kuerti in a group known as the Marlboro Trio.

Tree was described by Steinhardt as an efficient problem solver, and as "one part musician, one part cutup", always ready to relieve an overly-intense moment with a joke or some kind of buffoonery. He was the most high-strung member of the quartet, particularly prone to nervousness before performances. An avid tennis player, he liked to play with local experts or with friends while on tour.

Violoncello (1964–2001)

David Soyer (b. Philadelphia, 24 Feb 1923; d. New York, 25 Feb 2010) Soyer was, by about 12 years, the oldest of the original members of the quartet, and his pre-Guarneri experience was more extensive. The only one in the group who was not trained at Curtis, Soyer studied cello with Diran Alexanian, Emanuel Feuermann, and Pablo Casals. During World War II, he played euphonium in the United States Navy Band. Following the war, he played cello as a member of the NBC Symphony Orchestra under Arturo Toscanini, Columbia Symphony Orchestra, the Ed Sullivan Show orchestra, and various groups that recorded jingles and commercials. He played with several chamber music ensembles before the Guarneri: the Guilet and New Music Quartets, the short-lived American Quartet with John Dalley, and the Marlboro Trio with Michael Tree and Anton Kuerti.

In rehearsals, Soyer was outspoken and forceful; Steinhardt describes him as "blunt and highly opinionated". Soyer considered that his experiences performing commercial music helped him grow as an artist, and firmly believed that young musicians should be exposed to dance music, folk music, and gypsy fiddling. He was a connoisseur of art, and an avid sailor who owned a 24-foot (7.3 m) sloop.

Violoncello (2001–2009)

Peter Wiley (b. Utica NY, 1955) Wiley grew up in central New York State, and at age 11, he started cello lessons with David Soyer during the time the Guarneri Quartet was in residence at Harpur College in Binghamton. When Soyer joined the faculty of Curtis Institute in 1968, Wiley enrolled there and continued his cello studies. Graduating in 1974, he played with the Pittsburgh Symphony and the Cincinnati Symphony before joining the Beaux Arts Trio to replace retiring cellist Bernard Greenhouse. He left the Beaux Arts in 1998 to co-found the Opus One Piano Quartet. When Soyer retired from the Guarneri in 2001, Wiley was quickly and unanimously chosen to succeed his mentor.

== Instruments ==
Despite the group's name, only one instrument made by the celebrated Guarneri family of Cremona was played for any significant time by a member of the quartet: for many years David Soyer used an Andrea Guarneri cello made in 1669. He later switched to a Gagliano cello made in Naples in 1778. After trying several violins (including a Guarneri), Steinhardt settled on a Cremona instrument made by Lorenzo Storioni in the late 18th century. Dalley plays a French violin made in 1810 by Nicholas Lupot. In the quartet's early years Tree played a viola (patterned after Andrea Guarneri's "Conte Vitale") made by Harvey Fairbanks, a luthier from Binghamton, New York. Later, his primary instrument became a 1750 viola made by Dominicus Busan of Venice; he also plays a modern instrument made by Hiroshi Iizuka. Wiley plays a cello made around 1700 by Matteo Goffriller of Venice.

At one point in the mid-1990s the quartet was offered the extended loan of a set of four rare Stradivarius instruments owned by the Corcoran Gallery in Washington, D.C. After considering the offer, the Guarneri musicians declined, preferring to play the instruments each had chosen for himself. Steinhardt has compared the task of finding a violin well matched to a performer's style to that of finding a spouse, and he adds, "After much trial and error, each of us has found what could aptly be called his musical soul mate."

== History and activities ==
Steinhardt, Dalley, Tree and Soyer coalesced into the Guarneri Quartet at the Marlboro Music School and Festival in Marlboro VT, where all of them spent summers during the early 1960s. During the summers of 1962 and 1963, the four played chamber music together in various permutations, and with encouragement from Festival director Rudolf Serkin and from Alexander Schneider (second violinist of the Budapest String Quartet) the new quartet was launched on 20 July 1964 with a concert at Nantucket, Massachusetts. The name Guarneri was suggested by Boris Kroyt (violist of the Budapest String Quartet), who had played with a short-lived group of that name in Germany before World War II.

In the fall of 1964, the quartet began a four-year residency at Harpur College (now known as Binghamton University) in Binghamton, New York, where they taught advanced students, held a series of open rehearsals, and played 15 public concerts per year. Steinardt relates that the group found the situation attractive because Binghamton was within driving distance of their base in New York City, and it would provide an opportunity to rapidly build a repertoire, gain performing experience, and develop working relationships among themselves.

The Guarneri's New York City debut took place on 28 February 1965 at the New School for Social Research as part of a concert series arranged by Alexander Schneider. The enthusiastic audience included Fritz Steinway, of the concert management firm Judson, O’Neill, Beall and Steinway (which would shortly become the group's manager) and Max Wilcox, a record producer for RCA Victor, who quickly secured a recording contract for the Guarneri. Soon afterward, the group replaced the retiring Budapest String Quartet in a series of concerts at the Metropolitan Museum of Art – a series that extended across the Guarneri's lifespan, ending only when the quartet disbanded in 2009. They appeared at the Mostly Mozart Festival beginning in 1966, and an ongoing series at Lincoln Center's Alice Tully Hall began in 1975. Other frequent New York venues included the Frick Collection, the 92nd Street Y, Rockefeller University and Washington Irving High School.

The Guarneri began touring almost immediately, with a concert in Cleveland on 20 April 1965. In the summer of that year they embarked upon their first European tour, performing in Geneva, Basel, Amsterdam, Cologne, and at the Festival of Two Worlds in Spoleto, Italy. As the quartet's reputation grew, both domestic and international tours became a way of life – often a grueling one. (Note: Ruttencutter documents examples of their schedules in the period around the late 1970s: in the fall of 1977, for example, they performed in 21 American cities, in addition to playing half a dozen New York concerts; in 1981 they were scheduled for 18 European concerts within 20 days. Over the course of its career, the quartet also performed in Mexico, South America, Australia, China and Japan.) In the early years they played as many as 130 concerts per year, although by the 1980s they were attempting – not always successfully – to limit their appearances to 100 per year.

While the members of the quartet unanimously and emphatically preferred live performances to studio recordings, they were, from the beginning, prolific recording artists. Their first session for RCA Victor took place in June 1965, and included quartets by Mozart, Dvořák and Mendelssohn. (Note: Steinhardt’s book devotes chapter 7 to the group’s experiences making recordings, and their mixed feelings about the process and its results.) By 1998 the Guarneri's catalog exceeded 50 LPs and CDs, including numerous recordings with pianist Arthur Rubinstein. A partial discography can be found below.

The Guarneri musicians were active in teaching throughout the quartet's life. The affiliation with Harpur College continued until 1968, and in that year Steinhardt, Tree and Soyer were appointed to the faculty of the Curtis Institute of Music in Philadelphia. The members continued summer teaching at Marlboro, and in 1983, all four were appointed artists-in-residence at the University of Maryland at College Park, where they continued teaching up to and beyond the formal dissolution of the Guarneri Quartet in 2009.

David Soyer, who was about a dozen years older than his colleagues, retired in 2001, and his place was taken by Peter Wiley, Soyer's former student. The transition was symbolized in a Carnegie Hall concert that year, in which the Guarneri performed the Beethoven Quartet in B-flat major, op. 130, with Soyer playing cello, followed by the String Quintet in C by Schubert, with Soyer and Wiley taking the two cello parts. The incorporation of Wiley as cellist was a smooth one: "I don't feel like the new guy," he remarked. "I was a fan of the quartet since I was 11 years old…It was a very natural transition for me." Dalley added "It was actually very good for us when Peter came in, even though the quartet field was new to him…I think I learned more from Peter than he learned from us. He had a lot of good ideas that were brand new to us."

The members of the quartet decided to disband at the end of the 2009 season, with the intention of going out on a high note. Steinhardt remarked on the difficulty of their work, and added "We all had the sense that we're still playing pretty well, and it's better to quit at that point than to go past our time. We had surprisingly little discussion; everybody came to that conclusion rather quickly." Critics agreed that it was time to bow out; while still praising the Guarneri's tone and style, they perceived increasing technical imperfections and a decrease in the intensity of the group's emotional connection with the music. For some of the final concerts, David Soyer rejoined the Guarneri as the group once again played the Schubert Quintet in C, which is scored for two cellos.

David Soyer died on 25 February 2010, and Michael Tree died on 30 March 2018. As of 2018, the other Guarneri musicians continue to teach and perform under their own names. (Note: After 2009, even when all of the former members of the quartet performed together, the billing did not list them as the Guarneri Quartet.)

== Musical style and repertoire ==
The Guarneri's musical style was distinctive and widely admired. It has been described as "suave, elegant, highly nuanced, technically flawless", as "lush and vibrant sound married to an intensity of purpose", and as "seamless, warm and impassioned playing [with] a unanimity that did not efface individual personalities." Philadelphia critic Daniel Patrick Stearns remarked that:

Audiences kept coming back for the warmth of tone that was built from the inside out, with an unusually strong presence from second violin and viola, but with soft attacks and releases. Steinhardt's leaner tone defined that cloud of sound with a laserlike precision.

The quartet took a dramatic, even rambunctious approach to performing music; Steinhardt called it "swashbuckling and boisterous" when contrasting it with the Orion String Quartet, whose style he admiringly described as "refined and thoughtful." In another context he stated that "our top priority is to try and deliver the essence of the music and create goosebumps – give a performance that will be as memorable and vital and energetic as possible. I'd like to think we set caution slightly to the side in favor of emotional impact." The high-voltage performance style mellowed somewhat as the group matured; in a 2009 review of the quartet's performance of Beethoven's Quartet in E-flat, op. 127, Oregon critic David Stabler reported:

Instead of the feel of discovery, freshness and unpredictability, we heard more tempered playing. Instead of sharpness and strength in the opening of the E-Flat Quartet, the soft-pedaled sounds suggested a different way of engaging with the music. Less about surprise and urgency, more about knowing and acceptance. For the Guarneri, it was ground well trodden.

Many quartets strive to present a clean and cohesive tone, working to coordinate phrasing, bowing and intonation so as to create the sense of a single instrument with four registers. David Blum notes that the Guarneri explicitly followed a different path:

They readily admit that other quartets look for and achieve a more consistent blend of timbre and unity of style. They enter into the music’s expressive stream and let it work upon them, even if, in so doing, an occasional rough edge appears. Their goal is always to communicate the music as a living experience.

In a similar vein, Dalley expressed the Guarneri musicians’ intent as follows:

[Y]ou heard four individual voices rather than four people trying to play alike. We liked to stand out individually in the quartet rather than play in a unified way. We wanted to have our own personalities come through rather than be submissive.

Tree agreed:

I think in view of many of our colleagues we'll be best known for never making a fuss about playing the same bowings. Some players would come backstage and wonder if we were fighting, because our bowings were different. We were unorthodox from the beginning, having a strong notion that we should play as best we can individually in our own comfort zone in terms of bowings and fingerings and so forth.

In its early years, the Guarneri's repertoire focused primarily on music of 18th and 19th century composers, and they became particularly known for their interpretations of Beethoven’s quartets. However, by the 1980s the quartet was incorporating more music from the 20th century in its programs. The musicians took a selective approach to modern music – they were not enthusiastic about what Tree called "very experimental, avant-garde music" and they had mixed feelings about Schoenberg and Shostakovich – but they became champions of the quartets of Bartók and their repertoire eventually included music by Webern, Berg, Stravinsky, Vincent Persichetti, Paul Hindemith, Witold Lutosławski, Hans Werner Henze, Leon Kirchner, and William Klenz. Several original compositions were written for the group, by Ned Rorem, Lukas Foss, Mario Davidovsky, and Richard Danielpour. The group also made a point of performing seldom-heard quartets by earlier composers, including those of Jean Sibelius, Leoš Janáček, Zoltán Kodály, and Juan Crisóstomo de Arriaga.

== Group dynamics ==
Unlike most performing ensembles, the Guarneri permitted, and even encouraged, public awareness of their work as they prepared concerts, and they allowed backstage glimpses of the interpersonal dynamics within the group. From the beginning they conducted "genuine" open rehearsals, in which audiences could listen as they argued over the best way to play a passage or whether a piece they were considering ought to become part of their repertoire. They frequently held interactive sessions with audiences and they regularly made themselves available for interviews by journalists and writers. On several occasions they allowed observers to travel with the quartet and to publish detailed accounts of their activities onstage, in rehearsal, and during their travel time and free hours. (Note: Reports from such observers provided the raw material for books by Helen Drees Ruttencutter and by David Blum (see Resources), as well as for the documentary film High Fidelity – The Guarneri String Quartet (see Films)) In addition, Arnold Steinhardt published a book of memoirs in 1998 under the title Indivisible by Four: A String Quartet in Search of Harmony (see Resources). As a result of all this, a good deal is known about the way the group worked, musically and psychologically.

From the beginning, the Guarneri members rejected the then-common notion that the first violinist was the leader of the ensemble. (Note: In this they followed the example of the Budapest String Quartet, whose members encouraged and advised the Guarneri musicians as the quartet was taking shape.) The group insisted that all of the players were equals, and as a symbol of this, determined that whenever a piece called for one violin (for example, a piano quartet), second violinist John Dalley would play that part unless he chose not to do so. Similarly, all decisions were to be made by the group as a whole – and since four is an even number, that stance guaranteed a great deal of discussion when two members favored one option and two others preferred a different one. Dalley expressed the group's position as follows:

You have to be able to bend or give up some of your ideas. If you don't compensate and give in and compromise, you just don't get along. I think we had four strong personalities, and that's good. It's one way for a quartet to mature. The other way is to have a dictator who rules over the other three. That's the way it was in Europe, but Americans don't like that. It works faster, but the democratic way is more satisfying.

Thus the Guarneri's rehearsals were marked by vigorous give-and-take, with disagreements frequent and forcefully expressed. No point was too small for debate: in musical notation, a dot over a note means that it should be played staccato, and Steinhardt describes one public rehearsal in which the group argued for 20 minutes over precisely how much shortening one particular staccato-marked note ought to have. In general majority opinions prevailed, but a minority voice was listened to, and occasionally when one member had extremely strong feelings on a matter, he was allowed veto power. When the group's decision process hit a deadlock, they would sometimes play the passage one way for a Monday concert and a different way on Tuesday. (Note: cf. Steinhardt 101. An amusing extreme was a concert in which the others disliked the tempo set by Tree for the final movement of a Beethoven quartet, and when it was over, after emphatic argument in the wings between bows, the group returned to the stage and played the movement at a faster pace as an encore.) The players came to accept and expect the constant flow of criticism without resentment, and the rehearsals were also laced with friendly banter and corny jokes. But praise was almost never expressed; Steinhardt describes the Guarneri as a "compliment-free zone," noting that this reduced competitiveness and eliminated any pressure to offer congratulations in return.

However, the frequency and intensity with which the players had to work together forced them to adopt measures to preserve their individual identities and maintain some degree of personal privacy. They seldom socialized outside of concert-related events, and while touring they often made independent travel and hotel arrangements. They would frequently split up during off days while on tour, and consciously avoided asking about the activities of the others. (Note: Dalley was particularly elusive outside of work hours, and Steinhardt reports that "Where’s John?" was a frequent question while the group was travelling. Once when the quartet had two days off between concerts in Florida, Dalley disappeared, leaving behind the impression that he was going to visit relatives in Orlando. Eventually he revealed that he had flown back to his New Jersey home to strip the linoleum from his kitchen floor, returning to Florida in time for the next concert.) The musicians maintained a firewall between the quartet's activities and their family lives, and summers were protected as Guarneri-free time.

The devices the players used to resolve problems and maintain their personal privacy, combined with their genuine fondness for each other and for the music they played, made possible an unusually long life for the quartet. The four original musicians performed together for 37 consecutive years, "a remarkable record of longevity for a string quartet, in which tensions over music making, money and personal differences often cause breakups." After Soyer retired, the group continued, with Wiley playing cello, for another 8 years, bringing the Guarneri's total life to 45 years with only one personnel change. (Note: Few quartets have even approached this record. The Budapest String Quartet disbanded in 1967 after 40 years, having included a total of 11 different players over the years. As of 2014 the Juilliard String Quartet and the Fine Arts Quartet are both in their 68th year, but they have included 15 and 19 musicians, respectively, during their lifespans.) The quartet's longevity, along with the readily-available material about the group's interpersonal dynamics, has made it possible for the Guarneri to be used as a model in studies and pedagogy regarding collaborative leadership.

== Cultural impact ==
There were only about a dozen American string quartets in 1964 when the Guarneri was born. Just 16 years later, there were over 250. While that growth cannot be attributed to any single cause, the Guarneri is frequently cited as a significant force assisting the boom. For one thing, the members’ active work as teachers increased student interest in playing string quartets. One need look no further than Peter Wiley, who began his cello studies with Soyer, to see an example. The group's teaching at Harpur, at University of Maryland, and particularly at Marlboro and Curtis certainly helped young musicians to develop an appetite for quartet music. James Reel quotes a Curtis student's thoughts:

"There was always an excitement in the air at Curtis when they were about to show up," recalls Lucy Chapman Stoltzman, who studied particularly with Steinhardt, often in lessons lasting more than two hours…"It was the pure beauty of their sound and legato, and the sense of the inner voices was so strong, the sense of every voice being important in the way you want it to be," she says. "The Guarneri brought it to some new level that I hadn't heard before."

Another way in which the Guarneri facilitated the growth of interest in playing chamber music was through the example they set. In the early 1960s, music students aspired primarily to careers as soloists or orchestral musicians. The four Guarneri players took a substantial financial risk by establishing themselves as a professional string quartet in the absence of bookings, recording contracts, concert management, or even certainty of sufficient public interest. In the wake of their success, however, other musicians have been able to launch new quartets with more confidence that they can make a living playing chamber music, and by commanding significant fees, the Guarneri raised the payment baseline for all string quartets.

Finally, the Guarneri helped to build public awareness of chamber music, and thus increase demand for it. Their eagerness to communicate with their audiences, their interviews, open rehearsals, question-and-answer sessions all helped to make string quartets less esoteric, more familiar to listeners. Helen Drees Ruttencutter put it this way:

They are said to have done for quartet music in America what Leonard Bernstein did for symphonic music – made it accessible and appealing to everyone open to a new musical experience. Audiences get a quadruple dose of what many managers consider one of the most important elements for a career in music: charisma. They have been hailed all over the world as "the Great American Quartet of the era" and "the greatest string quartet in the world."

== Recordings ==
The Guarneri String Quartet has made numerous recordings during its long history, including some of the most important works in the string quartet and chamber music literature. They recorded for Arabesque, RCA Victor Red Seal, Philips and Surroundedby Entertainment. All recordings are with David Soyer as cellist unless it is noted that the cellist is Peter Wiley. A partial discography includes:

- Juan Crisóstomo Arriaga – Complete String Quartets
- Béla Bartók – Complete String Quartets
- Ludwig van Beethoven – Complete String Quartets (recorded twice: on RCA and Philips), String Quintet in C Op. 29 (with Pinchas Zukerman)
- Alexander Borodin – String Quartet No. 2
- Johannes Brahms – Complete String Quartets, Complete String Quintets (with Pinchas Zukerman), Piano Quintet in f Op. 34 (with Arthur Rubinstein on RCA, with Peter Serkin on Philips), Complete Piano Quartets (with Arthur Rubinstein),
- Claude Debussy – String Quartet (recorded twice: on RCA and on Surroundedby Entertainment)
- Ernő Dohnányi – String Quartet No. 2 in Db (recorded twice: on RCA in 1980 and on Sony in 2009 with cellist Peter Wiley), String Quartet No. 3 in A (with cellist Peter Wiley)
- Antonín Dvořák – Piano Quintet No. 2 Op. 81 (with Arthur Rubinstein), Quartet in C Op. 61, in F Op. 96 ("American"), in G Op. 106, in Ab Op. 105, Viola Quintet in Eb Op. 97 (with Walter Trampler), Terzetto Op. 74
- Gabriel Fauré – String Quartet Op. 121 (recorded twice: on RCA and Surroundedby Entertainment), Piano Quartet in c Op. 15 (with Arthur Rubinstein)
- Edvard Grieg – String Quartet in g Op. 27 (recorded twice: on RCA and Philips)
- Joseph Haydn – String Quartets in D Op. 20 No. 4, in g Op. 74 No. 3, in G Op. 77 No. 1, in F Op. 77 No. 2
- Hans Werner Henze – Piano Quintet (with Peter Serkin)
- Leoš Janáček – Complete String Quartets
- Zoltán Kodály - Quartet for Strings no 2, Op. 10 (with cellist Peter Wiley)
- Felix Mendelssohn – String Quartet in an Op. 13, String Quartet in D Op. 44 No. 1, Viola Quintet in Bb Op. 87 (with Pinchas Zukerman), Octet in Eb Op. 20 (with the Orion String Quartet)
- Wolfgang Amadeus Mozart – The Complete Piano Quartets (with Arthur Rubinstein), Eine kleine Nachtmusik (with Julius Levine), 6 String Quartets dedicated to Joseph Haydn (recorded twice: for RCA and Philips) (in G K387, in d K421, in E K428, in Bb K458, in A K464, in C K465), String Quartet in D K499, String Quartet in D K575, String Quartet in Bb K589, String Quartet in F K590, The Complete Viola Quintets (with Ida Kavafian, Steven Tenenbom, and Kim Kashkashian)
- Maurice Ravel – String Quartet (recorded twice: for RCA and Surroundedby Entertainment)
- Franz Schubert – String Quartets in a D804 (recorded twice: for RCA and Arabesque), in c "Quartettsatz", in d D810 "Death and the Maiden" (recorded twice: for RCA and Arabesque), in G D887, String Quintet in C D956 (with Leonard Rose), "Trout" Quintet D667 (with Emanuel Ax and Julius Levine)
- Robert Schumann – Complete String Quartets, Op. 41, Piano Quintet in Eb Op. 44 (with Arthur Rubinstein)
- Jean Sibelius – String Quartet in D minor Op. 56 Voces intimae
- Bedřich Smetana – String Quartet in E minor ("From my Life")
- Pyotr Ilyich Tchaikovsky – String Quartet No. 1 in D Op. 11, "Souvenir de Florence" Sextet Op. 70 (with Boris Kroyt and Mischa Schneider)
- Giuseppe Verdi – String Quartet in E minor
- Hugo Wolf – Italian Serenade

== Awards ==
- 2005: The Ford Honors Award, University Musical Society of the University of Michigan.
- 2004: The Richard J. Bogomolny National Service Award, Chamber Music America.
- 1992: Award of Merit, Association of Performing Arts Presenters in New York City.
- 1983: Honorary Doctorate degrees by the State University of New York.
- 1982: New York Seal of Recognition.
- 1976: Honorary Doctorate degrees by the University of South Florida

== Films ==
- 1989: High Fidelity – The Guarneri String Quartet, directed and produced by Allan Miller.

== Resources ==
- David Blum (1986). The Art of Quartet Playing: The Guarneri Quartet in Conversation with David Blum, New York: Alfred A. Knopf Inc. ISBN 0-394-53985-0.
- I. Fink & C. Merriell with the Guarneri String Quartet (1985). String Quartet Playing, New Jersey: Paganiniana Publications, Inc. ISBN 0-86622-007-0
- Helen Drees Ruttencutter (1980). Quartet: a Profile of the Guarneri Quartet. New York. Lippincott & Crowell Publishers. ISBN 0-690-01944-0
- Arnold Steinhardt (1998). Indivisible by Four: A String Quartet in Pursuit of Harmony, New York: Farrar, Straus and Giroux. ISBN 0-374-23670-4.
