= Isidore Cohen =

American musician (1922–2005)

Isidore Cohen (December 16, 1922 in Brooklyn, New York – June 23, 2005 in Bronx, New York) was a renowned chamber musician and violinist and member, at different times, of both the Juilliard String Quartet and the Beaux Arts Trio.

Cohen began studying violin at age six, and graduated from the High School of Music and Art in Manhattan, although his intention was to become a doctor. His pre-med studies at Brooklyn College were interrupted by serving in Europe with the U.S. Army during World War II. From there on, his career focus changed as he decided he'd rather touch people's lives through music.

Upon returning to civilian life, he became a student of Ivan Galamian at Juilliard. Galamian had misgivings about accepting a 24-year-old student, but wanted to help a war veteran. From there, his life as a musician started to blossom, even drawing the attention of Igor Stravinsky with his performance of Stravinsky's L'Histoire du Soldat. He became well known for his attention given to modern composers, and notably worked closely on many pieces with John Cage.

As of the 1950s, Cohen was serving as the concertmaster of the orchestras at the Casals festivals in France and Puerto Rico, in addition to several ensembles in New York City including the Colombia symphony orchestra. He was frequently concertmaster for Leonard Bernstein's televised "Young People's Concerts". His performance as concertmaster under Stravinsky's baton of "The Rite of Spring" is one of those preserved on the gold album carried by the Voyager spacecraft. In 1952 Alexander Schneider invited Cohen to join his quartet as second violinist. During Cohen's tenure, the Schneider quartet recorded the first complete set of Joseph Haydn's string quartets, a milestone noted in Time magazine.

Beginning in 1958, Cohen became second violinist of the Juilliard String Quartet, a post he held for nearly a decade. As a member of the quartet, Cohen also served on faculty at Juilliard from 1958 to 1966.

In 1968, following the retirement of violinist Daniel Guilet, he was persuaded to join the Beaux Arts Trio by pianist Menahem Pressler and cellist Bernard Greenhouse. By the mid-1970s they were touring and recording as the world's best-known and busiest piano trio. During Cohen's time with the trio, dozens of recordings were released, including the complete piano trios of Ludwig van Beethoven, Haydn, Mozart, Dvořák, Brahms, as well as works by Chopin, Pyotr Tchaikovsky, Sergei Rachmaninoff, Charles Ives, and Dmitri Shostakovich. After twenty-three years with the group, he was succeeded as violinist by Ida Kavafian.

As a teacher, Cohen was on faculty at numerous institutions and festivals in addition to Juilliard, including the Aspen Music Festival the Curtis Institute of Music, Princeton University, SUNY at Stony Brook, and the Manhattan School of Music. His longest association was with the Marlboro Music Festival, where beginning in 1966 he taught for nearly forty years.
