= Carlton Cooley =

American violist and composer

Samuel Carlton Cooley (April 15, 1898, in Milford, New Jersey – November 1981 in Stockton, New Jersey) was an American violist and composer.

== Biography ==
Cooley studied at the Philadelphia Musical Academy with Frederick Hahn and Camille Zeckwer, and later with Percy Goetschius and Louis Svečenski at the Institute of Musical Art (Juilliard School) in New York City.

In 1919, Cooley joined the viola section of the Philadelphia Orchestra for one year before he was appointed principal violist of the Cleveland Orchestra in 1922, a position in which he remained until 1937. He was principal violist of the NBC Symphony Orchestra from 1937 to 1954 during the years of Arturo Toscanini's tenure. In 1954, upon Toscanini's retirement, Cooley joined the Philadelphia Orchestra viola section under Eugene Ormandy and was appointed principal violist in 1956, succeeding Harry Zaratzian. He remained with the Philadelphia Orchestra until his retirement in 1963. Cooley was also violist with the Cleveland String Quartet and NBC String Quartet.

== Recordings ==
Viola

- Richard Strauss: Don Quixote – Emanuel Feuermann (cello); Carlton Cooley (viola); Arturo Toscanini (conductor); NBC Symphony Orchestra (1938)
- Wolfgang Amadeus Mozart: Sinfonia Concertante for violin, viola and orchestra, K. 364 – Mischa Mischakoff (violin); Carlton Cooley (viola); Arturo Toscanini (conductor); NBC Symphony Orchestra (1941)
- Richard Strauss: Don Quixote – Frank Miller (cello); Carlton Cooley (viola); Arturo Toscanini (conductor); NBC Symphony Orchestra (1948)
- Hector Berlioz: Harold en Italie – Carlton Cooley (viola); Arturo Toscanini (conductor); NBC Symphony Orchestra (1949)
- Giorgio Federico Ghedini: Pezzo Concertante for 2 violins, viola and orchestra (1931) – Mischa Mischakoff, Max Hollander (violins); Carlton Cooley (viola); Guido Cantelli (conductor); NBC Symphony Orchestra (1949–1952)
- Richard Strauss: Don Quixote – Lorne Munroe (cello); Carlton Cooley (viola); Eugene Ormandy (conductor); Philadelphia Orchestra (1963)
- Carlton Cooley: Aria and Dance for viola and orchestra – Carlton Cooley (viola); Eugene Ormandy (conductor); Philadelphia Orchestra; First Chair Encores (1965)

Chamber music

- Elizabeth Sprague Coolidge Foundation Concerts, Library of Congress – Coolidge Quartet; Carlton Cooley (viola)

Johannes Brahms: String Quintet in F major, Op. 88 (1882); recorded in 1943
Johannes Brahms: String Quintet in G major, Op. 111 (1890); recorded in 1943
Johannes Brahms: String Sextet in B♭ major, Op. 18 (1860); recorded in 1943
Johannes Brahms: String Sextet in G major, Op. 36 (1864–1865); recorded in 1943

- Gertrude Clarke Whittall Foundation Concerts, Library of Congress – Budapest String Quartet; Carlton Cooley (viola); Benar Heifetz (cello); Daniel Saidenberg (cello)

Johannes Brahms: String Quintet in F major, Op. 88 (1882); recorded in 1952
Johannes Brahms: String Sextet in B♭ major, Op. 18 (1860); recorded in 1948 and 1951
Johannes Brahms: String Sextet in G major, Op. 36 (1864–1865); recorded in 1948 and 1952
Antonín Dvořák: String Sextet in A major, Op. 48 (1878); recorded in 1948 and 1951
Wolfgang Amadeus Mozart: String Quintet in C major, K. 515 (1787); recorded in 1948
Wolfgang Amadeus Mozart: String Quintet in D major, K. 593 (1790); recorded in 1948
Arnold Schoenberg: Verklärte Nacht, Op. 4 (1899)

- Boris Koutzen: String Quartet No. 2 (1945) – Boris Koutzen, Bernard Robbins (violins); Carlton Cooley (viola); Harvey Shapiro (cello)
- Wolfgang Amadeus Mozart: Kegelstatt Trio, K. 498 – Sidney Forrest (clarinet), Carlton Cooley (viola); Ernő Balogh (piano)
- Pyotr Ilyich Tchaikovsky: Souvenir de Florence, Op. 70 (1890) – Guilet String Quartet; Carlton Cooley (viola); Naoum Benditzky (cello)

== Sources ==
- Riley, Maurice W. (1980), "Brief Biographies of Violists", The History of the Viola, Volume I, Ann Arbor, Michigan: Braun-Brumfield, p. 324.
- Philadelphia Orchestra Musicians: A Chronological Listing Retrieved 5 February 2011.
