= Wilfrid Van Wyck =

Wilfrid Van Wyck (16 November 1904 – 13 October 1983 in Woking, Surrey) was a British classical music artists impresario and manager through his agency, Wilfrid Van Wyck Ltd, based in London. He was the second president of the European Association of Artist Managers.

== Career ==
Van Wyck was the concert agent for cellists André Navarra, Aldo Parisot and János Starker; pianists Arthur Rubinstein, Witold Malcuzynski, Janina Fialkowska, Robert Casadesus and Ken Sasaki; soprano Victoria de los Ángeles; Kirsten Flagstad, the Beaux Arts Trio, Guarneri String Quartet, Fine Arts Quartet; the Utah Symphony Orchestra, then conducted by Maurice Abravanel, and many other artists and ensembles.

Wilfrid Van Wyck was also a partner in Rimington Van Wyck Ltd, a London record store and publisher at 42–43 Cranbourn Street, Leicester Square, London. He retired in 1970. His agency was purchased by London Management, part of the Grade Organisation.

Annabelle Whitestone, who worked for Van Wyck in the late 1960s, described him as a "difficult man" who was "very possessive about his artists."
