= Timothy Eddy =

American cellist

Timothy Eddy is an American cellist from Exeter, New Hampshire who is a founding member of the Orion String Quartet, a resident ensemble of the Mannes College The New School for Music. In 1978 he joined the Bach Aria Group and is a former member of Galimir String Quartet of New York Philomusica Chamber Ensemble. He is also a winner of numerous competitions such as the 1975 Cassado International Violoncello Competition, Dealy Competition and Denver Symphony Guild.

Eddy is a frequent performer at various festivals including both Sarasota and Santa Fe Chamber Music Festivals as well as Mostly Mozart and both Aspen and Marlboro Music School and Festivals. Besides national ones he has appeared at overseas festivals such as Lockenhaus Chamber Music and Turku music festivals as well as Festival dei Due Mondi.

His recordings have been released on Arabesque, New World, Nonesuch, Vanguard, and Vox Records as well as Delos Productions and Musical Heritage Society. Since 2001 he has been a faculty member at the Juilliard School. His bachelor's and master's degrees are both from the Manhattan School of Music. He is also a faculty member at Mannes School of Music.
