= Sharrow (disambiguation) =

Sharrow is a district of Sheffield, England.

Sharrow may also refer to:

- Sharrow (lane marking), a nickname for shared lane markings
- Sharrow, Alberta

== People with the surname ==
- Jimmy Sharrow (born 1985), American ice hockey player
- Leonard Sharrow (1915–2004), American classical bassoonist

== See also ==
- Sharow, a village and civil parish in North Yorkshire, England
- Sharrow Bay Country House
