= Olli Mustonen =

Finnish pianist, conductor, and composer (born 1967)

- Born: 7 June 1967 (age 59); Vantaa, Finland
- Occupations: Pianist; Conductor; Composer
- Organizations: Tapiola Sinfonietta; Korsholm Music Festival; Turku Music Festival

Olli Mustonen (born 7 June 1967) is a Finnish pianist, conductor, and composer.

== Biography ==
Olli Mustonen was born on 7 June 1967, in Vantaa, Finland.

He studied harpsichord and piano from the age of five with Ralf Gothóni and then Eero Heinonen. He studied composition with Einojuhani Rautavaara from 1975 and in 1987 won the Young Concert Artists International Auditions, which led to his New York City recital debut at Carnegie Hall.

His debut solo piano recording for Decca, of the cycles of preludes by Dmitri Shostakovich and Charles-Valentin Alkan, won both the Gramophone and Edison Awards. In addition to Decca, he has also made recordings for RCA and Ondine, notably of works by Beethoven and various modern Russian composers. Mustonen has performed with numerous major international orchestras and is regarded as "one of the internationally best-known pianists of his generation."

He has been artistic director of the Korsholm Music Festival in 1988 and the Turku Music Festival from 1990 to 1992. He is co-founder and director of the Helsinki Festival Orchestra, and since 2003 has conducted the chamber orchestra Tapiola Sinfonietta.

He performed the world premiere of Rodion Shchedrin's Piano Concerto No. 5 ("Four Russian Songs", 1998), which was dedicated to him, with Esa-Pekka Salonen and the Los Angeles Philharmonic, on 11 October 1999.

As a composer, his work shows a "predilection for contrapunctally interwoven compositions and works of the 20th century which take up ideas from the 17th and 18th centuries, for example the Bach arrangements by Ferruccio Busoni and the cycles of preludes and fugues by Shostakovich, or Ludus Tonalis by Paul Hindemith."

== Recordings ==
As pianist unless otherwise stated.

- Stravinsky: The works for violin and piano (Isabelle van Keulen, violin) – Philips Records (1987/1988)
- A Portrait of Olli Mustonen [as composer and pianist]: Fantasy for Piano and Orchestra (Ostrobothnian Chamber Orchestra/Juha Kangas); Six Bagatelles for Piano; Three Preludes for Piano; Ballade for Piano; On all Fours for Piano Four Hands (Raija Kerppo, hands 3 and 4); Three Simple Pieces for Cello and Piano (Martti Rousi, cello); Gavotte for Piano; Two Meditations for Piano; Toccata for Piano, String Quartet and Double Bass (Orion String Quartet; Esko Laine, double bass) – Finlandia Records (1989/1990)
- Shostakovich: 24 Preludes, op.34; Charles-Valentin Alkan: 25 Preludes, op.31 – London Records (1991)
- Mussorgsky: Pictures at an Exhibition; Tchaikovsky: Children's Album; Balakirev: Islamey – Decca Records (1993)
- Beethoven: Piano variations WoO 69, op.76, WoO 79, WoO 78, WoO 80, WoO 70, op.35, WoO 71 – Decca Records (1994)
- Stravinsky: Piano Concerto; Capriccio; Movements for Piano & Orchestra (Vladimir Ashkenazy, conductor; Deutscher-Symphonie-Orchester Berlin) – London Records (1994)
- Beethoven: Piano Concerto, op.61a after the Violin Concerto; Bach: Piano Concerto BWV 1054 (Deutsche Kammerphilharmonie/Jukka-Pekka Saraste) – Decca Records (1994)
- Prokofiev: Violin Sonatas 1 & 2, Music for Violin and Piano (Joshua Bell, violin) – Decca Records (1995)
- Grieg: Piano Concerto; Chopin: Piano Concerto No. 1 (San Francisco Symphony Orchestra/Herbert Blomstedt) – Decca Records (1996)
- Janáček/Shostakovich/Prokofiev: Works For Cello & Piano (Steven Isserlis, cello) – RCA Red Seal (1996)
- Prokofiev: Visions fugitives; Hindemith: Ludus tonalis – Decca Records (1996)
- Beethoven: Airs and variations, op.105; Ländler, WoO 11; Variations, WoO 77; Rondo, op.51/1; Variations, WoO 68; Minuet, WoO 82; Ecossaises, WoO 83; Bagatelles, op.126; Allegretto, WoO 61 – London Records (1996)
- Bach: 12 Preludes & Fugues from The Well-Tempered Clavier, Book 1; Shostakovich: 12 of 24 Preludes & Fugues, Op. 87 – RCA Red Seal (1999)
- Beethoven: Diabelli Variations – RCA Red Seal (1999)
- Messiaen: Quatuor pour la fin du temps; Shostakovich: Piano Trio No. 2 (Michael Collins, clarinet; Joshua Bell, violin; Steven Isserlis, cello) – Decca Records (2000)
- Prokofiev: Piano Concerto No. 3 (City of Birmingham Symphony Orchestra/Sakari Oramo) – Image Entertainment DVD (2000)
- Shchedrin: Cello Concerto, Seagull Suite (Helsinki Philharmonic Orchestra; Olli Mustonen, conductor) – Ondine Records (2001)
- Olli Mustonen: Triple Concerto; Petite Suite; Nonets Nos. 1 & 2 (Tapiola Sinfonietta; Olli Mustonen, conductor) – Ondine Records (2001)
- Mustonen plays Sibelius: Pieces, Op. 58; Jääkärien marssi, op.91a; Pieces, op.76; Rondinos, op.68; Bagatelles, op.34 – Ondine Records (2003)
- Sibelius: Symphony No. 3; Hindemith: The Four Temperaments (Helsinki Festival Orchestra; Olli Mustonen, conductor) – Ondine Records (2003)
- Mozart: Violin Concertos 3, 4 & 5 (Tapiola Sinfonietta; Pekka Kuusisto, violin; Olli Mustonen, conductor) – Ondine Records (2003)
- Bach & Shostakovich: Preludes & Fugues Vol.2 [completes the collections began in the 1999 recording] – Ondine Records (2004)
- Prokofiev: Cinderella Suite, Music for Children – Ondine Records (2006)
- Rachmaninoff: Piano Sonata No. 1; Tchaikovsky: The Seasons – Ondine Records (2006)
- Beethoven: Piano Concertos 1 & 2 (Tapiola Sinfonietta; Olli Mustonen, piano & conductor) – Ondine Records (2007)
- Beethoven: Piano Concerto No. 3 & Piano Concerto, op.61a (Tapiola Sinfonietta; Olli Mustonen, piano & conductor) – Ondine Records (2007)
- Beethoven: Piano Concertos 4 & 5 (Tapiola Sinfonietta; Olli Mustonen, piano & conductor) – Ondine Records (2009)
- Respighi: Concerto in modo misolydio (Finnish Radio Symphony Orchestra/Sakari Oramo) – Ondine Records (2010)
- Scriabin: 12 Etudes, Op. 8, 6 Preludes, Op. 13, 5 Preludes, Op. 16, Piano Sonata No. 10, Op. 70, Vers la flamme (Poème), Op. 72 – Ondine Records (2012)

== Compositions ==
For a complete list, see the external link for the Finnish Music Information Centre.

- Divertimento (1979) for piano and orchestra
- Fantasia (1985) for piano and strings
- Toccata (1989) for piano, string quartet and double bass
- Two Nonets (1995, 2000) for two string quartets and double bass
- Concerto for Three Violins (1998)
- Sinuhe – sonata for solo oboe (2005–2006)
- Jehkin Iivana – sonata for guitar (2004) or piano (2006)
- Sonata for cello and piano (2006)
- Symphony No. 1 Tuuri (2012) for baritone and orchestra
- Symphony No 2, Johannes Angelos (2013)
- Symphony No 3, Taivaanvalot (Heavenly Lights) (2020)
- String Quintet No. 1 (2015)
- String Quartet No. 1 (2017)

His composition style combines elements of the neo-classical, neo-baroque and romantic idioms, and he has also used minimalist patterns: 'The Baroque elements echo Stravinsky's Pulcinella or the stylizations of Martinů or Ottorino Respighi; these elements dominate the vivacious and rhythmic fast movements, whereas the slow movements are emphatically Romantic.'
