= Annabelle Whitestone =

British music manager

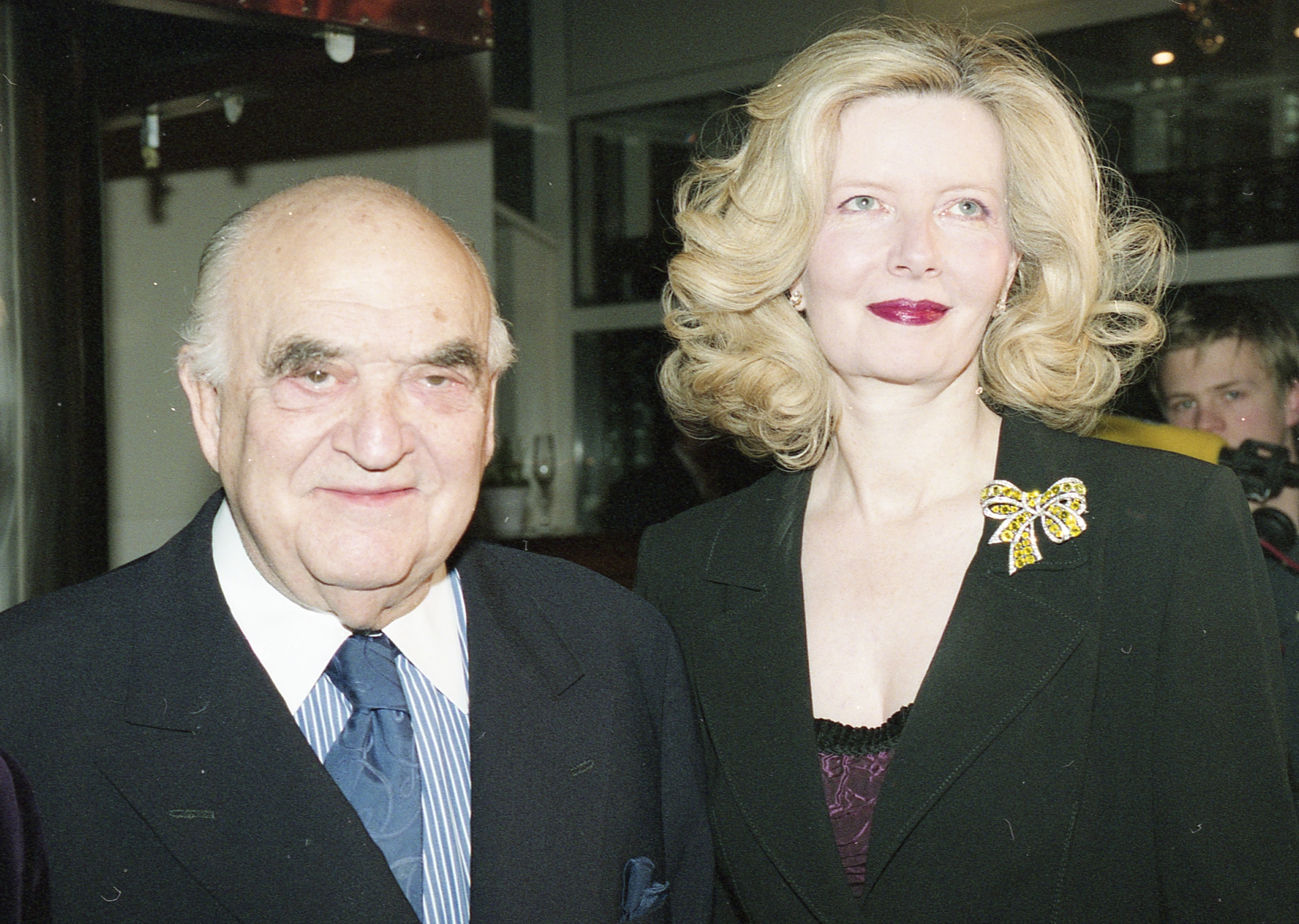
Annabelle with George Weidenfeld, 2001

Annabelle Whitestone, Baroness Weidenfeld (born October 1944), is an English former concert manager working with classical music impresarios including Ingpen & Williams, Ibbs and Tillett, Wilfrid Van Wyck, the English Bach Festival and, at the insistence and encouragement of the great violinist Henryk Szeryng, Conciertos Daniel in Madrid.

The Polish-American pianist Arthur Rubinstein credited Whitestone with assisting the careers of two of his protégés, François-René Duchâble and Janina Fialkowska.

In 1977, the 90-year-old Rubinstein left his wife Nela Młynarska after 45 years of marriage for Whitestone and lived with her in Geneva, Switzerland, until he died in 1982. Whitestone helped Rubinstein to write the second volume of his autobiography, My Many Years, which he dedicated to her. Rubinstein's first collaborator was Tony Madigan, whom he met in Marbella, and he transcribed the early part of the book.

Annabelle Whitestone was married to British publisher Lord Weidenfeld from 1992 until he died in 2016.

Whitestone convened Remembering Rubinstein, a day of talks and concerts at the Royal Academy of Music on 22 January 2008, to honour the pianist "who once sold as many records as rock stars and was as much at ease in the White House as he was with his chums Picasso and Charlie Chaplin." Lady Weidenfeld is a member of the board of directors of the Jerusalem Music Centre and the advisory board of the Jerusalem Foundation, and a member of the board of directors of the Arthur Rubinstein International Music Society.

Whitestone began in 2016 a relationship with pianist Menahem Pressler, whom she had known since 1966, which lasted until his death in 2023. She was his personal manager, and he dedicated his last Deutsche Grammophon recording of French music, “Clair de Lune”, to her.
