= Antônio Meneses =

Brazilian cellist (1957–2024)

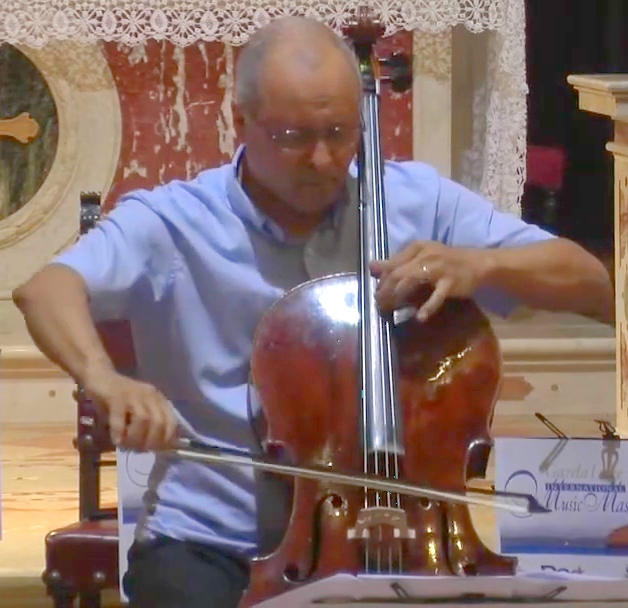
- Meneses in 2016
- Born: 23 August 1957; Recife, Brazil
- Died: 3 August 2024 (aged 66); Basel, Switzerland
- Occupations: Cellist; Academic teacher
- Organizations: Beaux Arts Trio; Bern Academy of Arts
- Awards: International Tchaikovsky Competition

Antônio Jeronimo de Meneses Neto (23 August 1957 – 3 August 2024) was a Brazilian cellist and an academic teacher based in Switzerland. Known professionally as Antônio Meneses, he won the first prize and gold medal at the 1982 International Tchaikovsky Competition in Moscow. He was the cellist of the Beaux Arts Trio from 1998 to 2008.

Meneses promoted the music of Brazilian composers, commissioning new works and recording the complete works for cello by Heitor Villa-Lobos. He taught at the Bern Academy of Arts. The Strad wrote that he "was one of the most acclaimed soloists and chamber musicians of his generation".

== Biography ==
Born in Recife to João Jeronimo Meneses and Rivanice Vieira de Meneses, Meneses was the eldest of five sons. He grew up in Rio de Janeiro. His father played French horn in the orchestra of the Rio de Janeiro Opera. He was the eldest of five brothers who all played string instruments. He played cello from age twelve, taught by Nydia Otero. He played in the youth orchestra of the Municipal Theatre and the Brazilian Symphony Orchestra (BSO). When he was 16, Antonio Janigro discovered him when he played with the BSO. Meneses subsequently studied with Janigro in Düsseldorf and at the Musikhochschule Stuttgart.

=== Performing ===
In 1977, Meneses won the first prize at the ARD International Music Competition in Munich, and in 1982, he was awarded first prize and gold medal at the Tchaikovsky Competition in Moscow, the only musician to win both competitions. He made his American debut with Claudio Abbado and the London Symphony Orchestra, followed by his New York City recital debut at the Metropolitan Museum of Art the following year. Meneses performed as a soloist with various orchestras, including the London Symphony Orchestra, the New York Philharmonic under Kurt Sanderling, and the Detroit Symphony Orchestra.

Meneses performed as a guest at various festivals, including the Edinburgh International Festival, Lucerne Festival, Aldeburgh Festival, Prague Spring, the Pablo Casals Festival in Puerto Rico, the Salzburg Festival, the Wiener Festwochen, the Berlin Festival, and the Mostly Mozart Festival.

Meneses regularly played chamber music with the Vermeer Quartet on tour in Europe and in Japan, as well as the Emerson String Quartet and the Amati Quartet. He was the cellist of the Beaux Arts Trio in its final incarnation, performing with pianist and founder Menahem Pressler and violinists Yung Uck Kim and Daniel Hope, from 1998 until the Beaux Arts Trio disbanded in 2008. In recital, he collaborated with pianists such as Pressler, Maria João Pires, Nelson Freire, and Gérard Wyss,

He usually played a Matteo Goffriller cello from 1710, and also a cello by Fabrice Girardin, and an instrument by Luiz Amorim and Filippo Fasser.

=== Recording ===
Meneses recorded Brahms' Double Concerto for violin and cello with Anne-Sophie Mutter and the Berlin Philharmonic conducted by Herbert von Karajan for Deutsche Grammophon in 1983. He also recorded Strauss' Don Quixote with Karajan and the orchestra. Meneses recorded works of David Popper with the Sinfonieorchester Basel. He made the first of his three recordings of Bach's Cello Suites for Philips Records Japan and recorded Tchaikovsky's Piano Trio with violinist Nadja Salerno-Sonnenberg and Cecile Licad for EMI/Angel. In July 1997, Meneses recorded the three concertos by Carl Philipp Emanuel Bach with the Munich Chamber Orchestra. In 2013, Deutsche Grammophon released a live recording from London's Wigmore Hall of Meneses and Maria João Pires playing music by Bach and Mendelssohn, Schubert's Arpeggione Sonata and the First Cello Sonata by Johannes Brahms. With pianist Gérard Wyss, he played the complete works by both Schubert and Schumann, and with Pressler chamber works by Beethoven. He recorded Haydn's Cello Concertos and Clóvis Pereira's Concertino with the Royal Northern Sinfonia. A CD of Elgar's Cello Concerto with the orchestra conducted by Claudio Cruz was nominated for a Grammy Award.

Meneses commissioned several works from composers from Brazil, for example in 2009 music inspired by Bach’s suites. He celebrated his 60th birthday by recording a CD of classical and Brazilian popular music with pianist André Mehmari in 2017. He recorded the complete works for cello by Heitor Villa-Lobos, and especially his cello concertos and the Fantasia for cello and orchestra with the São Paulo State Symphony Orchestra in 2023. A reviewer of the 2023 recording described his music-making as "very sensitive and always lively", expressive even in low register in spite of the dense texture of the compositions.

=== Teaching ===
Meneses was a professor of cello at the Bern Academy of Arts from 2008 until his retirement in 2023. He lectured at the Accademia Musicale Chigiana in Siena and at the Accademia Stauffer in Cremona. He gave masterclasses in Europe, Japan, and the United States. He taught students an attitude of strict respect towards a composer's score.

=== Personal life ===
Meneses was married twice. His first marriage was to pianist Cecile Licad, and the couple had a son, Otávio. The marriage ended in divorce. His second marriage was to Satoko Kuroda. While he never lived in Brazil again after leaving the country to study in Europe, he returned regularly for visits and playing chamber music with friends.

In June 2024, Meneses was diagnosed with glioblastoma multiforme and announced his immediate withdrawal from all his concert engagements and teaching positions. Meneses died in Basel on 3 August 2024, at the age of 66.
