= Cello Concerto No. 1 (Villa-Lobos) =

- by Heitor Villa-Lobos
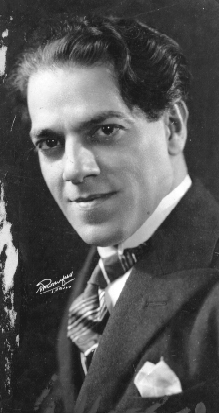
- Villa-Lobos, c. 1922
- Full title: Grande Concerto para Violoncello
- Opus: 50
- Composed: 1913
- Performed: 10 May 1919
- Duration: 20 minutes
- Movements: 3

The Cello Concerto No. 1 (Grande Concerto para Violoncello), Op. 50, was composed by Heitor Villa-Lobos in 1913 as his first large-scale work, showing the influence of Tchaikovsky.

Villa-Lobos was trained as a cellist, beginning at age 6 when his father, an amateur cellist, gave him first lessons on a viola converted to a small cello. He became a professional cellist. He composed his first cello concerto in 1913, as he dated the manuscript. It was his first large scale orchestral composition, written when he had not yet developed a personal style.

The cello concerto was premiered at the Teatro Municipal in Rio de Janeiro on 10 May 1919 with soloist Newton Pádua and the composer conducting.

== Structure and scoring ==
The concerto is in three movements:

1. Allegro con brio
2. Tempo de Gavotte – Assai moderato
3. Allegro Moderato

It is scored for an orchestra consisting of piccolo, two flutes, two oboes, two clarinets, two bassoons, four horns, three trumpets, three trombones, tuba, timpani, harp, and strings.

The music has been described as "full of youthful energy". The music shows the influence of Tchaikovsky. A performance lasts about twenty minutes.

== Recordings ==
The cello concerto was recorded, together with the composer's second cello concerto, in 1989 by soloist Ulrich Schmid with the Nordwestdeutsche Philharmonie conducted by Dominique Roggen. A CD of both cello concertos combined with the composer's Fantasia for cello and orchestra was released in 2023, with soloist Antonio Meneses and the São Paulo Symphony Orchestra conducted by Isaac Karabtchevsky.
