= David Soyer =

- Born: February 24, 1923; Philadelphia, U.S.
- Died: February 25, 2010 (aged 87); New York City, U.S.
- Education: Binghamton University
- Occupation: cellist

David Soyer (February 24, 1923 – February 25, 2010) was an American cellist.

He was born in Philadelphia and began playing the piano at the age of nine. At 11, he started the cello. One of his first teachers was Diran Alexanian. Later on he studied with Emanuel Feuermann and Pablo Casals. He debuted with the Philadelphia Orchestra under Eugene Ormandy in 1942, playing Ernest Bloch's Schelomo.

Chamber music was a special love of Soyer's. He was a founding member of the Guarneri Quartet in 1964 and played with them until retiring from the quartet in 2002. As a member of the Guarneri he collaborated with many of the world's most famous classical musicians, including Leonard Rose, the Budapest String Quartet, Pinchas Zukerman, and Arthur Rubinstein. He gave the New York premieres of the Solo Cello Sonatas by Zoltán Kodály and George Crumb. With David Tudor he premiered Earle Brown's Music for Cello and Piano. Before joining the quartet he played in various venues including the Navy Band (**) during World War II and later with the NBC Symphony Orchestra under the direction of Arturo Toscanini.

Soyer was on the faculty of the Curtis Institute of Music, the Manhattan School of Music, and the Juilliard School. Many of his students, such as Ronald Thomas and Peter Wiley, have gone on to have successful performing careers.

He taught many of today's most prominent contemporary cellists and musicians. He spent many summers teaching and performing at the Marlboro Music Festival in Vermont.

He received an honorary degree from Binghamton University. Soyer died at his home in New York City on February 25, 2010, one day after his 87th birthday.
