= Louis Svećenski =

Croatian-American violist, violinist and rector (1862-1926)

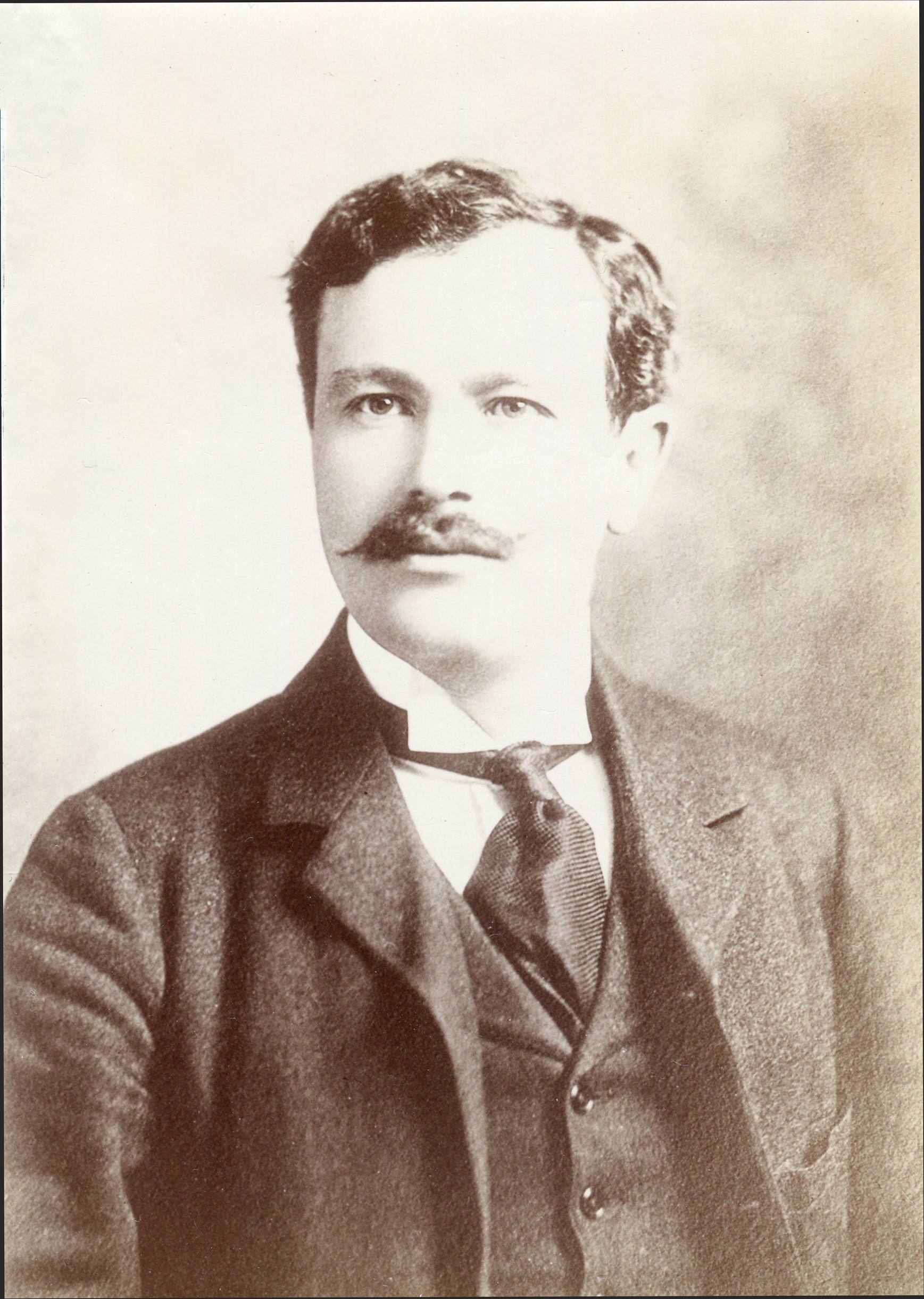
- Louis Svećenski
- Born: Ljudevit Kohn; November 7, 1862; Osijek, Austrian Empire (now Osijek, Croatia)
- Died: June 18, 1926 (aged 63); New York City, New York, U.S.
- Education: Croatian Music Institute, University of Music and Performing Arts, Vienna
- Occupations: Violist, violinists

Louis Svećenski (Croatian: Ljudevit "Lujo" Svećenski, born Ljudevit Kohn; November 7, 1862 – June 18, 1926) was a notable Croatian-American violist, violinist and rector of the Boston Academy of Music.

Svećenski was born in Osijek, Donji grad district on November 7, 1862 to a Jewish family. His father Adolf Abraham Kohn was from Bonyhád in Hungary, and his mother Terezija (née Fried) was from Darda just north of Osijek. Svećenski finished elementary and high school in Osijek. In 1877, at only 15 years of age, Svećenski was already recognized by the Osijek cultural public as a promising future musician. He graduated from the Croatian Music Institute in Zagreb on August 26, 1882 with compliments from Ivan Zajc. In September 1882, Svećenski started violin studies at the University of Music and Performing Arts, Vienna with a scholarship from the Croatian government in the amount of 500 krones. He graduated on July 15, 1885 with excellent grades. After graduation Svećenski returned to Zagreb where he asked the Croatian authorities to let him croaticize his surname from Kohn to Svećenski. His surname Kohn is variation of surname Kohen which means priest in Hebrew, while Svećenski is derived from the Croatian word svećenik which also means priest. How much he cared about his new surname is witnessed through the records from the time of his great popularity in the United States, where he requested that his last name is written with the right Croatian spelling, a letter "ć".

On July 10, 1885 Svećenski moved to Boston, Massachusetts. He was a founding member of the famous Kneisel Quartet and besides Franz Kneisel was the only original member to play with the quartet during its entire history from 1885–1917. He also played in the Boston Symphony Orchestra for 18 years (1885–1903), serving variously as a violist and violinist. He taught for several years at the Juilliard School and was one of the original faculty members at the Curtis Institute of Music (1924–1926). Some of his notable pupils include conductor and violinist Robert Talbot, and violist and composer Carlton Cooley.

Svećenski is credited with the erection of Osijek memorial plaque in 1895, for his friend Franjo Krežma. He stayed in touch with his hometown and family until the day he died on June 18, 1926.

== Pedagogical works ==
- 25 Technical Exercises for Viola (1917)
- Preparatory Exercises on the Violin for the Trill, the Vibrato and the Staccato, Preceded by Corrective Studies for the First and Fourth Fingers (1922)
- Specialized Exercises for Violin in Shifting and in Crossing the Strings (1923)

== Bibliography ==
- Kraus, Ognjen (1998). Dva stoljeća povijesti i kulture Židova u Zagrebu i Hrvatskoj. Zagreb: Židovska općina Zagreb. ISBN 953-96836-2-9.
