= Maurice Eisenberg =

Maurice Eisenberg (February 24, 1900 - December 13, 1972) was a cellist, both performer and teacher.

== Biography ==
Born in Königsberg in a family of a cantor, he was brought to the United States when he was two years old as his parents moved there in 1902.

He started learning violin and then studied cello in the Peabody Institute with such teachers as W. Wirts, Willem Willeke or Leo Schulz. Soloist, as early as 1916, of the Philadelphia Orchestra under Stokowski’s conducting, he became in 1918 principal cellist of the New York Philharmonic Orchestra, then conducted by Walter Damrosch.

In 1921, he met and even played with Pablo Casals who was touring the United States. The latter encouraged him further studying in Europe which he did with Julius Klengel, Hugo Becker, Nadia Boulanger and Diran Alexanian; Pablo Casals remained however his most important mentor and they became lifelong friends. Eisenberg spent the years between 1926-1939 playing and teaching in Europe:

- Soloist with the main European and American orchestras, he premiered, in 1938 with the Pasdeloup Orchestra, the Concerto ballata composed and conducted by Glazunov as well as the Rhapsodie Hébraïque Schelomo composed and conducted by Ernest Bloch. His interpretations of the Cello Suites (Bach) were a reference and he was playing in the Trio Menuhin.
- He founded and was the artistic director of the « London International Violoncello Center » and taught at the Ecole Normale de Musique de Paris where he succeeded Diran Alexanian.

In the U.S., he held teaching positions at the Academy of Music (Philadelphia), the University of Southern California as well as at the Cambridge Longy School and, for the ten last years of his life, at the International Summer Courses of Cascais (Portugal).

At the end of his life, Maurice Eisenberg was also teaching at the Juilliard School of Music, and he died in 1972 while giving a course there.

Maurice Eisenberg's book, Cello Playing of Today, first published in 1957, has been re-edited several times. Michael Masters, one of his students, organized the publication of the Eisenberg's annotated version of the Cello Suites (Bach).
