= Bernard Greenhouse =

American cellist (1916–2011)

- Born: January 3, 1916; Newark, New Jersey, U.S.
- Died: May 13, 2011 (aged 95); Wellfleet, Massachusetts, U.S.
- Occupation: Cellist
- Spouse: Aurora de la Luz Fernandez y Menendez

Bernard Greenhouse (January 3, 1916 – May 13, 2011) was an American cellist and one of the founding members of the Beaux Arts Trio.

== Life and career ==
Greenhouse was born in Newark, New Jersey and began playing the cello at the age of eight. He started his professional studies with Felix Salmond at the Juilliard School when he was eighteen. After four years of study with Salmond, Greenhouse proceeded to move on to studies with Emanuel Feuermann, Diran Alexanian, and then became one of the very few long-term students of Pablo Casals, studying with him from 1946 to 1948.

After finishing studies with Casals, Greenhouse went on to pursue a solo career for twelve years. He struggled with this however, as the cello was not a very popular solo instrument at the time. During this period, he encountered violinist Daniel Guilet, who invited Greenhouse in 1954 to play some Mozart piano trios with pianist Menahem Pressler. In 1955 they met in New York City, the first meeting of what was to become the Beaux Arts Trio.

In 1958, Greenhouse acquired the Countess of Stanlein, also called the Paganini Strad, one of 63 Antonio Stradivari cellos, and played it ever after. Following his death, it was to be sold by Boston violin dealer Christopher Reuning.

In 1987, he left the trio, and was replaced by cellist Peter Wiley. Greenhouse was known for his impeccable technique, but even more so for his inspiring passion and the depth and variety of his sound.

During his career, he taught at the Hartt College of Music, State University of New York at Stony Brook, Manhattan School of Music, New England Conservatory, Rutgers University and the Juilliard School. A series of videos of his master classes were produced in 1993 by Ethan Winer.

Though retired from institutional teaching, Greenhouse still gave master classes throughout the United States, Canada, China, Korea, Japan and Europe until his death in 2011.

Interviewed as the farewell concert of the Beaux Arts Trio on August 21, 2008, approached, he said he practiced every day and was considered "the old man of the cello", with other aging cellists being surprised that he still performed at the age of 95. Greenhouse also remained the oldest of those who have played in the trio, until at least 2015, Daniel Guilet (who was born about a week short of 17 years earlier) having died at the age of 91, and Isidore Cohen having died at 82.

Greenhouse's second passion was sailing on one of his several boats. He died on May 13, 2011, at his home overlooking the Wellfleet, Massachusetts, harbor on Cape Cod. His daughter with Aurora de la Luz Fernandez y Menendez, Elena, was married to author Nicholas Delbanco. His grandson-in-law is director Nicholas Stoller.

== Students ==
Greenhouse's notable students include:

- Sophia Bacelar
- Kurt Baldwin
- Telalit Charsky
- Timothy Eddy
- Stjepan Hauser
- Paul Katz
- Maxine Neuman
- Amit Peled
- Astrid Schween
- David Amsden Starkweather
- Damien Ventula
- Uzi Wiesel
- Kate Dillingham

== Partial discography ==
Appearances

With the Vellinger Quartet

- Schubert: String Quintet in C (BBCMM75, 1998)

With the Henri René Orchestra

- RCA Victor Presents Eartha Kitt (RCA, 1953)
- That Bad Eartha (EP) (RCA, 1954)
- Down To Eartha (RCA, 1955)
- That Bad Eartha (LP) (RCA, 1956)
- Thursday's Child (RCA, 1957)
