= New York Philomusica Chamber Ensemble =

The New York Philomusica Chamber Ensemble is a musical ensemble founded in 1971 by A. Robert Johnson in New York City. The group presents an annual concert series of chamber music in New York City, Rockland County, and occasionally performs on tour. The ensemble owns the New York Philomusica Records label, which they use to sell albums of their music.

== History ==
In 1971, the New York Philomusica Chamber Ensemble put on the Festival of History and Music in the hamlet of Tappan. This led to a seven-week residency at Dartmouth College in 1973, where they performed for the community of Hanover, New Hampshire. This was followed by the ensemble's New York City Metropolitan Subscription concerts in all five boroughs of New York City from 1975–1979, and at the New York State Capitol Region Residency from 1979–1981. The ensemble produced A Serenade to Beethoven at Sarasota Springs, Florida, narrated by George Plimpton for television in 1982. In 1987, the ensemble was sent on a nine concert tour of Latin America by the US Department of State.

The ensemble's range of programming includes the 1993 world premiere of Stravinsky's A Soldier's Tale, with Kurt Vonnegut’s new text, the 1999 American premiere of Beethoven’s Concerto No. 4 for Piano and String Quintet, and numerous collaborations with the late jazz pianist Sir Roland Hanna.

The ensemble produced the first American recording of Messiaen’s Quartet for the End of Time, and is the first group to record the entire Mozart divertimento catalogue. The divertimento recordings were originally released by VoxBox Productions in 1975, and were followed by a release of Mozart Wind Serenades.

New York Philomusica Records, the ensemble's record label, was established in 1992 and has released 27 titles.

== Activities ==
The centerpiece of the ensemble’s current activities is their annual concert series in New York City and the parallel series in nearby Rockland County, New York. The group emphasizes its Featured Composer program, which provides commissions for new works and features the work of contemporary composers. Former Featured Composers include Dr. Iain Hamilton, Jacob Druckman, and John Harbison. Michael Berkeley has been the current Featured Composer since 2005.

In 2008, the ensemble introduced a series of Educational Seminars which were aimed at elementary and high school students. The group occasionally performs on tour, most recently in November 2007 in Hudson, New York.

== Common misconceptions ==
The New York Philomusica Chamber Ensemble is frequently confused with the New York Philharmonic, but they are not the same organization and are not in any way related.

== 2008–2009 concert series ==
September 27, 2008: Rockland County
October 2, 2008: New York, NY

Joseph Haydn: L'isola disabitata

Concert performance of Haydn opera, L’isola disabitata (The Uninhabited Island). Based on a 1754 text by the eminent poet Pietro Metastasio, the story of shipwreck, pirates, and true love has been set by no fewer than 30 composers. The concert featured singers Nicole Franklin, soprano; Soon Cho, mezzo soprano; Scott Murphree, tenor; and Mischa Bouvier, baritone.

–New York Philomusica

December 6, 2008: Rockland County
December 11, 2008: New York, NY

Benjamin Britten: Fantasy Quartet, Op. 1, for oboe, violin, viola, and cello
Claude Debussy: Sonate in g minor for violin and piano
Mozart: Quartet in F, K. 370, for oboe, violin, viola and cello
Dvořák: Trio No. 4 in e minor, “Dumky,” Op. 90, for piano, violin and cello

February 7, 2009: Rockland County
February 12, 2009: New York, NY

Joseph Haydn: Quartet in D, “The Frog,” Op. 50, No. 6, for string quartet
Michael Berkeley: Torque & Velocity (1997) for string quartet
Dvořák: Quintet in G, Op. 77, for 2 violins, viola, cello & contrabass

April 4, 2009: Rockland County
April 6, 2009: New York, NY

Aaron Copland: Sextet for clarinet, piano & string quartet (arr. from Short Symphony)
Claude Debussy: Epigraphes antiques for piano four-hands
Beethoven: Sonata No. 4 in a minor, Op. 23, for violin and piano
Mozart: Quintet in A, K. 581, for clarinet & string quartet

== Video advertising campaign ==
In 2007, skateboarder Charlie Samuels contributed to an online video campaign in which Samuels is seen skateboarding around New York City while listening to the New York Philomusica play music composed by Joseph Haydn.

== Reviews ==
The New York Times: Philomusica Plays Delectable Mozart And Brehm Sextet
The New York Times: UNUSUAL WORKS BY PHILOMUSICA; It Plays a Kim Premiere and a Weill Piece
The New York Times: Music Noted in Brief; The Philomusica Offers An All-Schumann Concert
The New York Times: Review/Music; Kurt Vonnegut's Reinterpretation of 'L'Histoire du Soldat'
The New York Times: IN PERFORMANCE: CLASSICAL MUSIC; Remembering a Jazzman As a Classmate and Teacher
New York Magazine: Life During Wartime
Albany Times Union: Philomusica shows Mozart's enduring power and passion
