= Leonard Sharrow =

American bassoonist

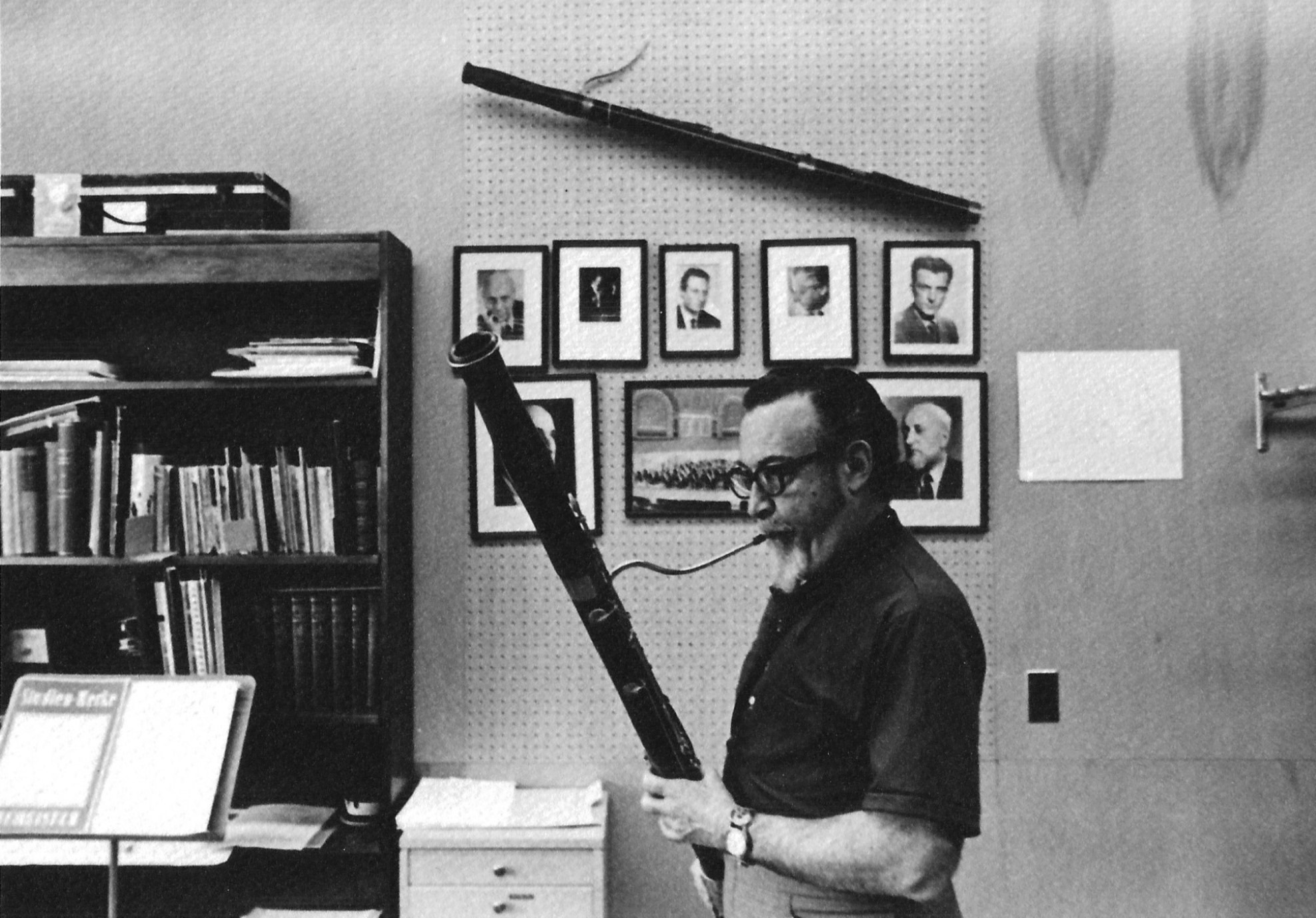
- Sharrow in 1974

Background information
- Born: August 4, 1915; New York City
- Died: August 9, 2004 (aged 89) Cincinnati, Ohio
- Occupations: Classical Musician; Professor
- Instrument: Bassoon

Leonard Sharrow (August 4, 1915 – August 9, 2004) was one of the most recorded and recognized bassoon players of the 20th century. Sharrow was a founding member of the NBC Symphony, and is best known for his tenure as principal bassoon of the Chicago Symphony Orchestra under Fritz Reiner.

== Life and career ==
Born in New York City Sharrow began his musical studies on violin, switching to bassoon as a teenager. His first instrument was a French bassoon with 9 keys, and he eventually switched to a German bassoon in the early 1930s. Sharrow's first position was as principal bassoon of the National Symphony Orchestra, appointed by Hans Kindler at the beginning of the 1935 season. In 1936, Sharrow was recruited by Arturo Toscanini to join the NBC Symphony in New York, an offer he accepted for the start of the 1937–38 season. Though drafted into the U.S. Army during World War II, Sharrow was able to return to his job with the NBC Symphony and was promoted to principal bassoonist in 1947.

In 1951 Sharrow left New York to join the Chicago Symphony Orchestra after being appointed principal bassoon by music director Rafael Kubelík. Sharrow decided to retire from the Chicago Symphony in 1964 shortly after the death of Fritz Reiner. Upon retirement, he moved to Bloomington, Indiana to join the bassoon faculty of Indiana University. He taught for many years at Indiana University, as well as at the Aspen Music Festival. In 1977, Sharrow came out of retirement to accept appointment as co-principal bassoonist of the Pittsburgh Symphony with music director André Previn.

Sharrow played most of his career on Heckel bassoon #8243. It was refinished by Jim Laslie & Paul Nordby in 1998. His first Heckel bassoon was #7620, which he used throughout his time in the NBC Symphony.

== Later life ==
After retiring from Pittsburgh in 1986 Sharrow returned to Bloomington, eventually relocating to Cincinnati, Ohio to be near his family. He continued to teach bassoon lessons privately and at the Banff Music Centre throughout the 1980s and 90s. Sharrow died of Leukemia on August 9th, 2004.
