= Diran Alexanian =

Cellist and Armenian cello teacher (1881–1954)

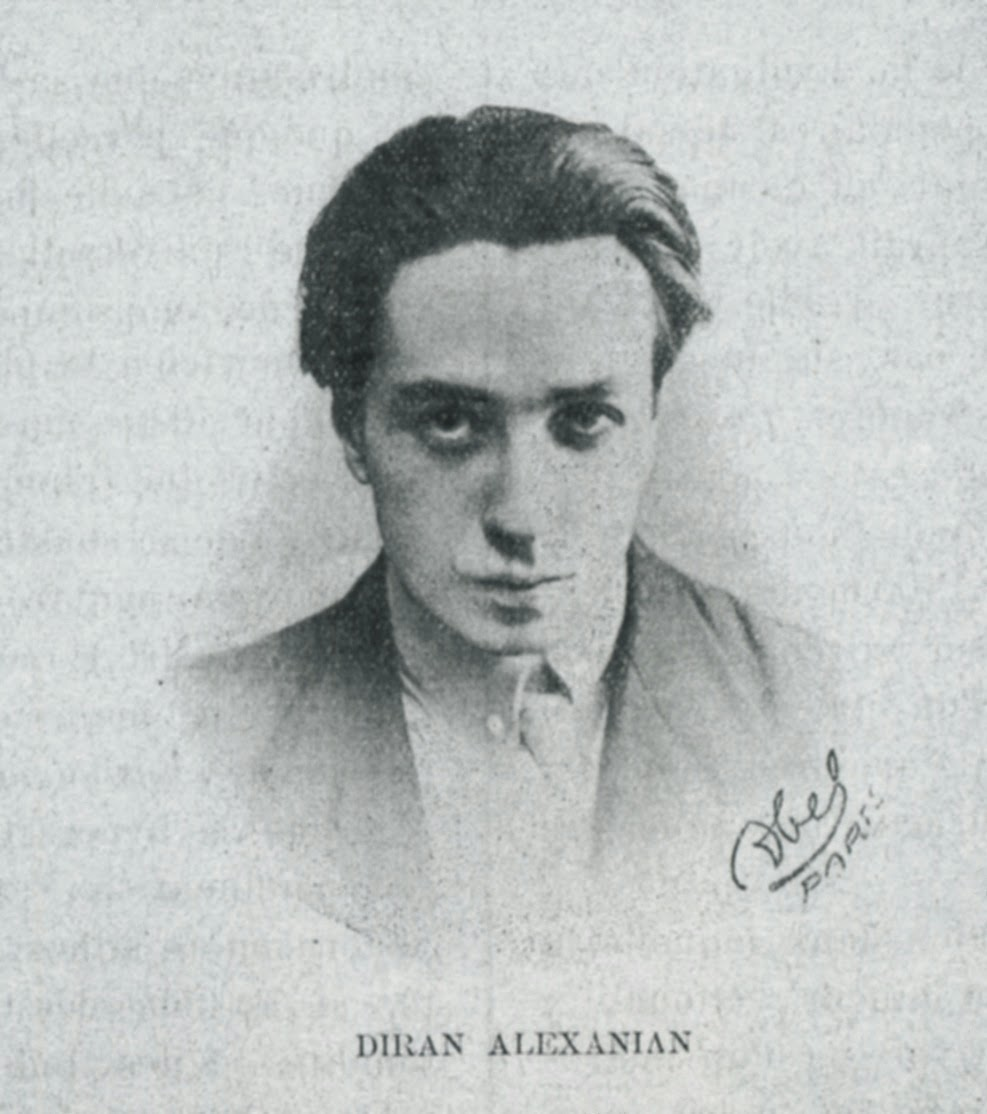
- Alexanian in 1900
- Born: April 12, 1881; Constantinople, modern day Turkey
- Died: June 4, 1954 (aged 73); Chamonix, France
- Burial place: Chamonix, France
- Education: Dresden Conservatory
- Occupations: Cellist and teacher

Diran Alexanian (Armenian: Տիրան Ալեքսանեան) (April 12, 1881, Constantinople – 1954, Chamonix, France) was an Armenian cello teacher and one of the world's greatest virtuoso cellists.

== Early life ==
Alexanian started his studies in music under the supervision of his maternal uncle Hovannes Aznavour. He continued studying the cello with Guatelli, an Italian musician based in Constantinople. At age 14, in 1895, despite his parents' objections, he moved to Germany and became a pupil of Friedrich Grützmacher at the Dresden Conservatory in Leipzig, and through him met violinist Joseph Joachim as well as Johannes Brahms and began to play in his orchestra. At a young age he was an accomplished cellist, performing at age seventeen the solo part of Richard Strauss's Don Quixote.

At age twenty, Alexanian settled in Paris, where he met Pablo Casals. Casals had seen Alexanian perform, and noticed that Alexanian's fingering was in line with his new way of playing the cello. They got to know one another, finding they had similar views on general technique and interpretation of music.

In 1921, Alexanian became the assistant to Casals at the École Normale de Musique (founded in 1919 by Alfred Cortot and Auguste Mangeot, where Casals was a teacher, as well as Jacques Thibaud. There, he and Casals put their revolutionary ideas into practice. Students from around the world came to study with him at this time, including Gabriel Cusson, Maurice Eisenberg, Antonio Janigro, Gregor Piatigorsky, Audrey Piggott, Hidayat Inayat Khan, Pierre Fournier, Rodica Sutzu, and Emmanuel Feuermann. During his tenure at the school, Alexanian published his 1922 book on cello technique, Traite Theorique et Pratique du Violoncelle, as well as his famous edition of the Bach Suites in 1929. In a concert at the École 1933 he premiered Frederick Jacobi's Concerto (Three Psalms) for Cello and Orchestra (which Jacobi had dedicated to Alexanian), under conductor Alfred Cortot.

Alexanian abandoned his position at the École in 1937, and moved to the United States. There he taught both at the Peabody Institute in Baltimore, and the Manhattan School of Music in New York City. There his students included Bernard Greenhouse, David Soyer, George Ricci, Raya Garbousova, David Wells, and Mischa Schneider.

== Composing ==
Diran Alexanian's first attempts at composing during the course of his studies in Germany were his choral works written for the choir of the Protestant church. As a composer, he is best known for writing a number of transcripts based on ancient songs - sacred or profane. His «Little Armenian Suite» (1919) composed for chamber orchestra, includes instrumental versions of the liturgical piece «Khorurt khorin» and profane chants «Oror», «Alaguiaz» and «Hovarek» («The Deep Mystery», «Lullaby», «Alaguiaz Mountain» and «Given the Freshness»). This Suite was performed for the first time at a gala in honor of the famous Armenian writer and journalist Arshak Chobanian at Paris's Gaveau concert hall. There are also well-known arrangements of popular pieces for strings, especially for the cello. His works include «Two Poems», by Camille Mauclair, for voice and piano, 1919, Paris, Mathot edition, «Soir, les roses dans le coupe», after Albert Samain's poem, for voice and piano, 1918, Paris, Ricordi edition, Qintet for piano and strings, Two pieces, «Aria» and «Pastoral» for cello and piano from the «Christmas oratorio» by J.S. Bach, 1904, Paris, «Lullaby» for cello and piano, 1923, Paris.

== Death ==
Diran Alexanian died in France in 1954, at the age of 73, during his European tour.
