= Turku music festival =

Coordinates: 60.4517°N 22.2669°E

Turku Music Festival (Finnish: Turun musiikkijuhlat, Swedish: Åbo musikfestspel) is the oldest continuously operating music festival in Finland. The festival was founded in 1960 by the Musical Society in Turku. The city festival offers audiences' big orchestral concerts, chamber music concerts, recitals, jazz, out-door events and concerts. The festival is annually visited by both international and Finnish artists.

The festival takes place in several concert halls, churches and other venues in Turku such as the Turku Concert Hall, the Academy Hall, the Turku Cathedral, Sigyn Hall, the Turku Castle and the Sibelius Museum.

The program consists of orchestral concerts by Turku's own philharmonic orchestra as well as several visiting ensembles and conductors, soloists, chamber musicians, jazz musicians and also some staged or semi-staged music performances.

In 2019 the conductor and cellist Klaus Mäkeläthe became festival's artistic director. Previous artistic directors have been pianist/conductor Ville Matvejeff, tenor Topi Lehtipuu, pianist/conductor Olli Mustonen and cellist Martti Rousi.

== Artists who have visited the festival ==
- Violin: Lisa Batiashvili, Joshua Bell, Igor Oistrakh, Gidon Kremer, Anne-Sophie Mutter
- Cello: Steven Isserlis, Heinrich Schiff, Arto Noras, Natalia Gutman
- Song: Sonya Yoncheva, Elina Garanca, Natalie Dessay, Jorma Hynninen, Soile Isokoski, Jonas Kaufmann, Karita Mattila, Matti Salminen, Elisabeth Schwarzkopf, Rolando Villazón
- Piano: Emil Gilels, Claudio Arrau, Grigory Sokolov, Rodion Shchedrin, Andras Schiff, Olli Mustonen, Murray Perahia, Svjatoslav Richter, Yefim Bronfman, Vladimir Ashkenazy, Lang Lang, Bella Davidovich, Jonathan Biss
- Conductors: Paavo Järvi, Daniel Harding, Valeri Gergiev, Rene Jacobs, Yevgeny Mravinsky, Yuri Temirkanov, Sergiu Celibidache, Esa-Pekka Salonen, Yehudi Menuhin, Vladimir Ashkenazy, Mikhail Pletnev, Sakari Oramo, Myung-Whun Chung
- Orchestras: St. Petersburg Philharmonic Orchestra, Mariinsky Theatre Orchestra, London Philharmonia Orchestra, The Finnish Radio Symphony Orchestra, The Swedish Radio Symphony Orchestra, Seoul Philharmonic Orchestra
- String-quartets: Lindsay String Quartet, Borodin Quartet, Chilingirian Quartet, Meta4
- Early Music: Emmanuelle Haïm, Jordi Savall, Gustav Leonhardt, Ton Koopman, Le Concert d'Astrée, Helsinki Baroque Orchestra, Il pomo d'oro
- Rock: Apocalyptica
- Other guests: Donna Leon, John Malkovich
