= Boris Koutzen =

Russian composer

Boris Koutzen (1 April 1901 – 10 December 1966) was a Russian-American violinist composer and music educator.

== Biography ==
Koutzen was born in Uman, Southern Russia. He began composing at the age of six and studied violin with his father. In 1918 his family moved to Moscow, where Boris entered the Moscow Conservatory to study violin with Lev Tseitlin, and composition with Reinhold Glière. That same year, he won the national competition for the position of first violin in the State Opera House Orchestra, and later joined the Moscow Symphony Orchestra under Serge Koussevitzky.

In the fall of 1923 Koutzen came to the United States and became a member of the first violin section of the Philadelphia orchestra under Leopold Stokowski. From 1937 until 1945 he was a member of the NBC Symphony Orchestra under Arturo Toscanini. Mr. Koutzen was head of the violin department of the Philadelphia Conservatory from 1925-1962. In 1944 he joined the faculty of Vassar College, where he taught violin and conducted the Vassar orchestra until 1966.

He died after suffering a heart attack while conducting a dress rehearsal, only a few months after retiring his teaching post at Vassar. He was survived by his family of musicians: his wife Inez, a pianist, his son George, cellist and administrator of the Little Orchestra Society, and his daughter Nadia, a concert violinist.

== Selected works ==
Stage

- You Never Know, Comic Opera in 1 act (1960)

Orchestral

- Valley Forge (1931), which won a Juilliard School of Music award in 1943
- From the American Folklore, Concert Overture (1943)
- Divertimento (1956)

1. Pop Concert
2. At the Ballet
3. Holiday Mood

- Elegiac Rhapsody (1961)
- Solitude, Poème-nocturne
- Symphony in C
- Fanfare, Prayer, and March

Band

- Symphonic Rhapsody

Concertante

- Symphonic movement (Mouvement symphonique) for violin and orchestra (1931)
- Concerto for cello, flute, clarinet, bassoon, horn and string orchestra (1934)
- Concert Piece for cello and string orchestra (1946)
- Concerto for viola and orchestra (1949)
- Morning Music for flute and string orchestra (1950)
- Concertino for piano and string orchestra
- Concerto for violin and orchestra

Chamber and instrumental music

- Légende for violin and piano (1928)
- Sonata No. 1 for violin and piano (1928)
- String Quartet No. 1
- Nocturne for violin and piano (1930)
- Duo concertante for violin and piano (1944)
- Music (Serenade) for saxophone, bassoon and cello (1945)
- String Quartet No. 2 (1945)
- Holiday Mood for violin and piano (1948)
- Foundation of Violin Playing (1951)
- Sonata for violin and cello (1952)
- Landscape and Dance for woodwind quintet (1953)
- Pastorale and Dance for violin (or clarinet) and piano (1965)
- Trio for flute, cello and harp (1965)
- Melody with Variations for violin (or clarinet) and piano (1966)
- Music for Violin Alone (1968)
- Sonata No. 2 for violin and piano (1970)
- Piano Trio (1977)
- Poem for violin solo and string quartet
- Sonata for solo violin

Keyboard

- Enigma for piano (1929)
- Sonatina for piano (1931)
- Fervent Is My Longing, Choral Prelude for organ (1935)
- Eidólons, Poem for piano (1953)
- Clown's Reverie and Dance for piano (1958)
- Sonnet for Organ (1965), premiered Feb 20th 1949 by E. Harold Geer at the Vassar College chapel
- Sonatina for 2 pianos (1944)

Choral

- An Invocation for women's voices and orchestra (or piano) (1958); words by John Addington Symonds
- Concerto for chorus and orchestra
- The Fatal Oath, one-act opera
