= Viviana Sofronitsky =

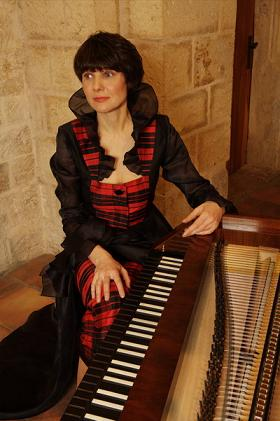

Background information
- Born: Софроницкая Вивиана Владимировна
- Genres: Classical music
- Instruments: Fortepiano and Piano
- Years active: 1982 to present
- Website: www.sofronitsky.com

Viviana Sofronitsky (Russian: Вивиана Владимировна Софроницкая) is a Russian and Canadian classical pianist, born in Moscow. Her father was the Soviet-Russian pianist Vladimir Sofronitsky.

== Life and career ==
She started her music studies at the Central Music School, and went on to earn a doctorate from the Moscow Conservatory. In the Soviet Union she worked with both then-current early music ensembles, Madrigal and The Chamber Music Academy (directed by Alexei Lubimov), while also touring as a solo artist in Moscow, Leningrad, Kiev, Minsk, Sverdlovsk, etc.

In 1989, Sofronitsky moved to the United States, where she worked at the Oberlin College Conservatory of Music in Ohio. In 1990, she moved to Canada, where she pursued an active career in performance and recording in Toronto, partnered with various members of the Tafelmusik Baroque Orchestra. She was a founder and the first artistic director of the Academy Concert Series in Toronto. Sofronitsky has been a Canadian citizen since 1994.

In 1999 she received historical performance degrees in harpsichord, fortepiano and early music teaching from the Royal Conservatory in The Hague.

Since 2001 she has lived in the Czech Republic, married to fortepiano builder Paul McNulty, performing and recording on his highly prized instruments an expanded repertoire from C.P.E. Bach to Liszt.

Viviana Sofronitsky is regularly performing at music festivals and giving masterclasses. Among the festivals that she attended are: «Utrecht Oude Muziek Festival» and "Muziek Netwerk" (Netherlands), «Leipzig Bach Festival»(Germany), «Klang& Raum Music Festival» Irsee (Germany), «Festival van Vlaanderen» (Belgium), Musica Antiqua Bruges (Belgium), «Berliner Tage für Alte Music» (Germany), Bratislava Hammerklavier Festival (Slovakia), «Chopin Festival» (Poland), Tage Alter Musik Osnabruck (Germany), «Midis-Minimes» (Belgium), «Oslo Chamber Music Festival» (Norway), «Vendsyssel Festival» (Denmark), «Piano Folia Festival», Le Touquet (France), Printemps des Arts, Nantes (France).

In 2010 Sofronitsky was first in the world to record all Mozart works for keyboard instrument with orchestra on original instruments (PMC/ETCetera label) and in 2017 she was first to perform on first modern copy of Chopin's Buchholtz piano which he played when he lived in Warsaw.

== Recordings ==
- W. A. Mozart: 11CD box, the first world complete works for piano and orchestra performed on original instruments. Fortepiano: Viviana Sofronitsky; Orchestra: Musicae Antiquae Collegium Varsoviense "Pro Musica Camerata", Poland.
- Felix Mendelssohn: Complete works for cello and fortepiano. Fortepiano: Viviana Sofronitsky, Violoncello: Sergei Istomin, «Passacaille Musica Vera», Belgium.
- Francizsek Lessel: Works for Piano and Orchestra. Fortepiano: Viviana Sofronitsky, Orchestra: Musicae Antiquae Collegium Varsoviense "Pro Musica Camerata", Poland.
- Beethoven, Hummel, Neuling: Works for fortepiano and mandolin. Fortepiano: Viviana Sofronitsky, Mandolin: Richard Walz "Globe", the Netherlands.
- Ludwig van Beethoven: Trios for clarinet, violoncello and fortepiano op.11 and op.38 Viviana Sofronitsky with "Die Gassenhauer". Fortepiano: Viviana Sofronitzki, Clarinet: Susanne Ehrhard, Violoncello: Pavel Serbin, "Suoni e colori", France.
- Fryderyk Chopin: Complete works for cello and piano with Sergei Istomin, Passacaille.
- Franz Schubert: Wanderer-Fantasie op. 15, Impromptus op. 142 and 90. AVI Music, Germany.
- Johann Ladislaus Dussek: Sonatas Op.9 and Op.75. Brilliant Classics, Netherlands.
