= NBC Symphony Orchestra =

American radio orchestra

- Radio orchestra
- Founded: 1937; 89 years ago
- Disbanded: 1954; 72 years ago (original); 1963; 63 years ago (renamed)
- Later name: Symphony of the Air
- Location: NBC Studio 8H and Carnegie Hall, New York City
- Principal conductor: Arturo Toscanini

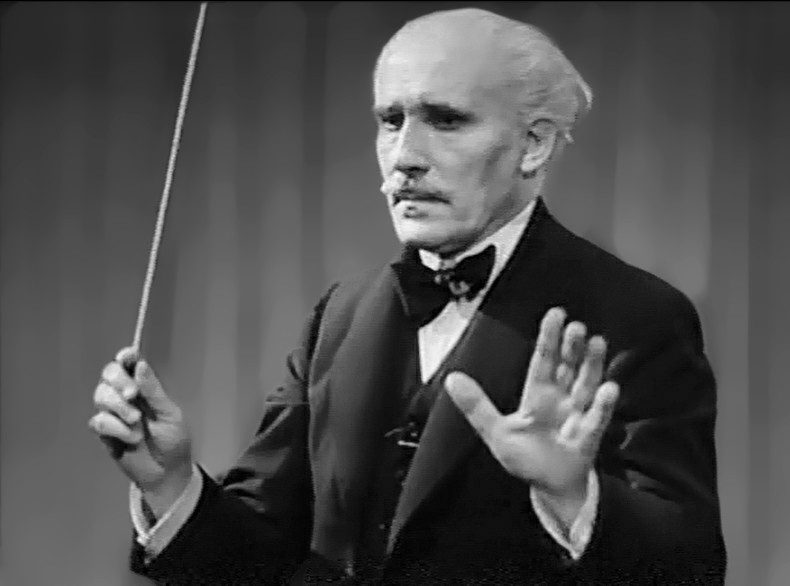
Toscanini in the Hymn of the Nations OWI film of December 1943

The NBC Symphony Orchestra was a radio orchestra conceived by David Sarnoff, the president of the Radio Corporation of America, the parent corporation of the National Broadcasting Company especially for the conductor Arturo Toscanini. The NBC Symphony Orchestra performed weekly radio broadcast concerts with Toscanini and other conductors and several of its players served in the house orchestra for the NBC Radio Network. NBC encouraged the public's perception of the orchestra as a full-time organization created exclusively for Toscanini but Fortune disclosed in 1938 that these instrumentalists played other network broadcasts: “the Toscanini concerts have been allocated only fifteen of the thirty hours a week each man works, including rehearsals.”

The NBC Symphony Orchestra's first broadcast was on November 13, 1937, and it continued until it was disbanded following Toscanini's retirement after his final broadcast concert on April 4, 1954. The orchestra was soon reorganized, independent of NBC, as the Symphony of the Air and performed from 1954 to 1963, under various conductors, including Leopold Stokowski.

== History ==
Tom Lewis, in the Organization of American Historians Magazine of History, described NBC's plan for cultural programming and the origin of the NBC Symphony:

David Sarnoff, who had first proposed the "radio music box" in 1916 so that listeners might enjoy "concerts, lectures, music, recitals", felt that the medium was failing to do this. By 1937, RCA had recovered enough from the effects of the Depression for it to make a dramatic commitment to cultural programming. Sarnoff proposed to create a radio orchestra and hire Arturo Toscanini to conduct it. Toscanini had recently resigned from the New York Philharmonic at age 69 and was considering retirement; Sarnoff sent Samuel Chotzinoff as an emissary to Italy and he managed to convince the wary Toscanini to accept Sarnoff's offer. On Christmas night, 1937, the NBC Symphony Orchestra gave its first performance with Toscanini in an entirely refurbished studio at NBC located in the RCA Building. "The National Broadcasting Company is an American business organization. It has employees and stockholders. It serves their interests best when it serves the public best." That Christmas night, and whenever the NBC orchestra played over the next 17 years, he was right.

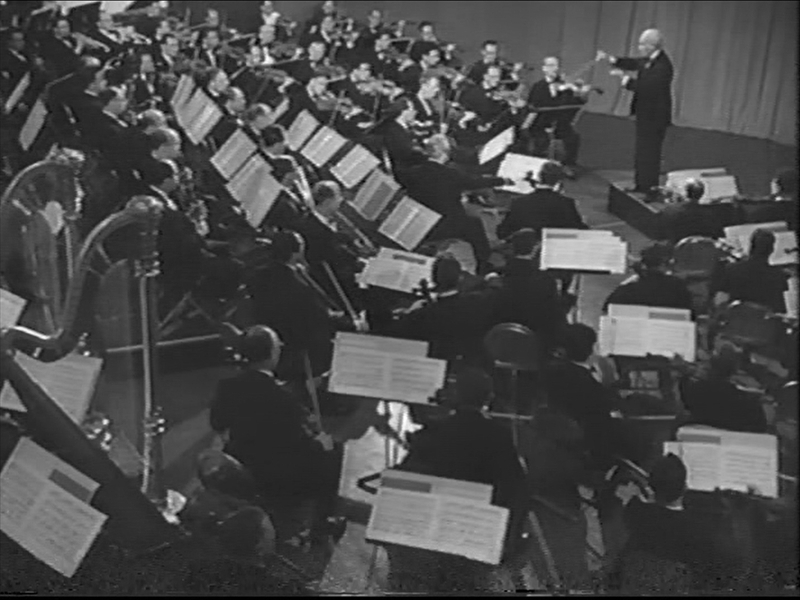
Arturo Toscanini conducting Verdi's La forza del destino overture

Sarnoff devoted considerable effort and resources to create an orchestra of the first rank for Toscanini and NBC. Artur Rodziński, an orchestra builder and musical task master in his own right, was engaged to mold and train the new orchestra in anticipation of the arrival of Toscanini. It offered the highest salaries of any orchestra at the time and a 52-week contract. Prominent musicians from major orchestras around the country were recruited and the conductor Pierre Monteux was hired as well to work with the orchestra in its formative months. A new large broadcast studio was built for the orchestra at NBC's Radio City Studios in Rockefeller Center, New York, Studio 8-H. In addition to creating prestige for the network, there has been speculation that one of the reasons NBC created the orchestra was to deflect a congressional inquiry into broadcasting standards.

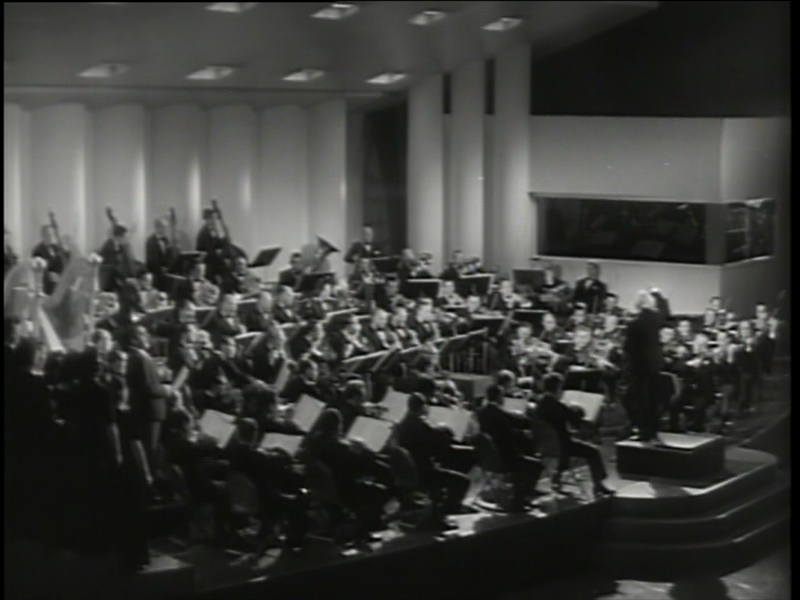
Toscanini and the NBC Symphony Orchestra performing Verdi's Hymn of the Nations, from 1944 OWI film

The orchestra's first concert was broadcast on November 13, 1937, under the direction of Monteux. Toscanini conducted ten concerts that first season, making his NBC debut on December 25, 1937. In addition to weekly broadcasts on the NBC Red and Blue networks, the NBC Symphony Orchestra made many recordings for RCA Victor. Televised concerts began in March, 1948 and continued until March, 1952. During the summer of 1950, NBC converted Studio 8-H into a television studio (the broadcast home of NBC's late-night comedy program Saturday Night Live since 1975) and moved the broadcast concerts to Carnegie Hall, where many of the orchestra's recording sessions and special concerts had already taken place.

For the new ensemble, many NBC staff musicians were auditioned by Rodzinski and Chotzinoff, along with about 700 members of other orchestras or chamber-music groups; 31 NBC players were retained in the new orchestra. The American Federation of Musicians union minimum for such staff work at NBC was $105 weekly, but many instrumentalists were paid considerably more. Fortune magazine disclosed that the NBC's extra cost for all the above-scale musicians, plus Toscanini's salary—as compared with a typical staff conductor’s—amounted to about $250K more than an orchestra of union-scale players under typical staff conductors.

Following a dispute between Toscanini and NBC, Leopold Stokowski served as principal conductor of the orchestra from 1941 to 1944 on a three-year contract. During this time, Toscanini continued to lead the orchestra in a series of public benefit concerts for war relief. He returned for the 1942–43 and 1943–44 seasons, sharing the podium with Stokowski as co-conductor and resuming full control thereafter. Upon Toscanini's retirement in the spring of 1954, NBC officially disbanded the orchestra, much to Toscanini's distress, though it continued for several years thereafter as the Symphony of the Air, independent of NBC. On April 4, 1954, Toscanini conducted his final broadcast concert with the NBC Symphony Orchestra at Carnegie Hall with an all-Wagner program. He led the orchestra for the last time during RCA Victor recording sessions held June 3 and 5, 1954.

=== Musicians ===
Some notable musicians who were members of the orchestra include violinists Samuel Antek, Leonid Bolotine, Henry Clifton, Felix Galimir, Andrew Galos, Josef Gingold, Daniel Guilet (concertmaster 1952–54), Harry Lookofsky, Mischa Mischakoff (concertmaster 1937–1952), Albert Pratz, David Sarser, Oscar Shumsky, Benjamin Steinberg, Herman Spielberg, Boris Koutzen and Andor Toth; violists Carlton Cooley, Milton Katims, William Primrose, and Tibor Serly; cellists Frank Miller, Leonard Rose, Harvey Shapiro, Alan Shulman, George Koutzen and David Soyer; double bassists Homer Mensch and Oscar G. Zimmerman; flutists Carmine Coppola, D. Antoinette Handy, Arthur Lora and Paul Renzi; clarinetists Augustin Duques, Al Gallodoro, David Weber and Alexander Williams; trombonist Norberto (Robert) Paolucci; saxophonist Frankie Trumbauer; oboists Robert Bloom, Paolo Renzi and Chauncey Vernon Kelley, Jr.; bassoonists Elias Carmen, Benjamin Kohon, William Polisi, Leonard Sharrow and Arthur Weisberg; French horn players Arthur Berv, Harry Berv, Jack Berv and Albert Stagliano; Harry Glantz, Bernard Baker, and Raymond Crisara trumpets and tuba player William Bell, among others.

Not all of the NBC Symphony performers were under full-time contracts to NBC. In the early 1950s, for example, only about 55 of these musicians were salaried; the rest were hired under per-service contracts (in line with Local 802 American Federation of Musicians wage scales) to bring the orchestra's performing and recording strength up to the 85 to 100 seen in period photographs and video footage. Even for the salaried members, NBC Symphony duties constituted barely half of their work obligations for NBC; these musicians played in orchestras for other NBC radio and television programs, with many of the wind players also serving with the Cities Service "Band of America" conducted by Paul Lavalle.

== Sponsorship ==
In the first several seasons the NBC Symphony broadcasts were "sustaining" programs, meaning that they were paid for and presented by NBC itself. In later years the broadcasts were commercially sponsored, primarily by General Motors. Under GM's sponsorship the NBC Symphony broadcasts went out under the title of General Motors Symphony of the Air, not to be confused with the later orchestra of the same name. Other sponsors included the House of Squibb, the Reynolds Metals Company, and the Socony Vacuum Oil Company (Mobil).

== Recordings ==
In early 1938, RCA Victor began making studio recordings of Toscanini and the NBC Symphony Orchestra for commercial release. Haydn's Symphony No. 88 was the first of these recordings to be issued; Mozart's Symphony No. 40, Rossini's William Tell Overture and the second and third movements from Beethoven's String Quartet, Op. 135, were also among the first works to be recorded. The orchestra recorded initially in Studio 8-H, but RCA Victor producer Charles O'Connell soon decided to move most of the studio recording sessions to Carnegie Hall. However, RCA Victor issued many live broadcast performances originating in Studio 8-H on records, and subsequently on CD. The dry acoustics of Studio 8-H, designed for radio broadcasting, were found to be less than ideal for recording. Ongoing acoustical modifications which began in 1939 were thought to have greatly improved the sound of Studio 8-H; although most NBC Symphony recording sessions were shifted to Carnegie Hall in 1940, the orchestra continued to record in 8-H sporadically as late as June 1950, after which the studio was converted for television broadcasting. From the autumn of 1950 until Toscanini's final recordings in June 1954, all NBC Symphony radio broadcasts and RCA Victor recording sessions took place in Carnegie Hall.

RCA Victor released the orchestra's recordings on its flagship Red Seal label on the then-standard 78-rpm record format. In 1950, a 1945 recording of Ferde Grofé's Grand Canyon Suite became the NBC Symphony's first LP release (LM-1004). A mainstay of RCA Victor's Red Seal catalog through the 1950s, most of the Toscanini/NBC Symphony recordings were reissued on the lower-priced RCA Victrola label to celebrate Toscanini's centenary in 1967. In the 1980s, RCA began digitally remastering recordings of the orchestra for release on compact disc. A complete reissue of all Toscanini's RCA Victor recordings was released on CD and cassette between 1990 and 1992 and again in 2012. Later advances in digital technology has led RCA (now owned by Sony Music) to claim further enhancement of the sound of the magnetic tapes for later reissues, changing original equalization balances and adding acoustical enhancement, but critics are divided in their judgment. RCA Victor has only reissued recordings that were personally approved by Toscanini, including some broadcast performances such as the seven complete operas he conducted at NBC between 1944 and 1954; however, several other labels have released discs taken from off-the-air recordings of NBC broadcast concerts. Toscanini's final two broadcast programs, in the spring of 1954, were experimentally recorded in stereo, but he did not approve their release; many years passed before they were finally issued unofficially by labels other than RCA Victor. Recorded in rather primitive and "minimalist" two-channel sound, the stereo antiphonal effect is striking (if crude); but the complete performance from March 21, 1954, of the Tchaikovsky Symphony No. 6 ("Pathetique") was not available entirely in stereo for many years as the master 2-track tape of the 'Allegro molto vivace' third movement had apparently been lost; an artificial stereo synthesis was substituted, but the missing stereo recording of the entire third movement was later found.

The complete series of ten NBC Symphony telecasts has been issued on VHS and LaserDisc by RCA in 1990 and on DVD by Testament in 2006. While the videos derive from kinescopes, the sound tracks were carefully synchronized from the highest fidelity transcriptions and tapes that exist.

One of the NBC Symphony Orchestra's most ambitious projects was the recording of the (nominally) 13-hour musical score for NBC Television's 1952–53 series Victory at Sea. Robert Russell Bennett conducted the orchestra in his scoring--recorded in Rockefeller Center's Center Theatre)--which incorporated a dozen musical themes provided by Richard Rodgers for the documentary's 26 episodes. The series is currently available on DVD. The first RCA Victor LP of excerpts was recorded by Bennett and the NBC SO musicians in July 1953. Bennett would later lead stereo recordings of volume 2 in 1957, a re-make of volume 1 in 1959, and a concluding volume 3 in 1961, conducting the RCA Victor Symphony Orchestra (members of the Symphony of the Air). RCA has reissued all of these recordings on CD.

In 1954, shortly after the orchestra's final concerts with Toscanini, RCA Victor made stereo recordings with Stokowski of excerpts from Prokofiev's ballet Romeo and Juliet and Gian Carlo Menotti's ballet Sebastian. The recordings were originally issued (monophonically) as "Leopold Stokowski and his orchestra", but reissued as "members of the NBC Symphony Orchestra". On April 6, 1954, just two days after Toscanini's final concert, Guido Cantelli and the orchestra recorded César Franck's Symphony in D minor in Carnegie Hall. Though the performance was recorded in stereo, RCA Victor initially issued the recording in mono. In 1978, the label finally issued the stereo recording.

== Symphony of the Air ==
After the NBC Symphony Orchestra disbanded, some members went on to play with other orchestras, such as Frank Miller (principal cello) and Leonard Sharrow (principal bassoon) with the Chicago Symphony Orchestra. However, many former NBC Symphony members, in an attempt to stay together and preserve the orchestra, regrouped as a new ensemble called the "Symphony of the Air". They made their first recording on September 21, 1954, and gave their first public concert at the United Nations 9th Anniversary Celebration on October 24. On November 14, they appeared on the acclaimed Omnibus TV program in which Leonard Bernstein, making his first television appearance, discussed Beethoven's Fifth Symphony, and Bernstein led the Symphony of the Air during its first season. With an Asian tour under the auspices of the State Department and an attendance of 60,000 at concerts in the Catskills that summer, the first season was a huge success.

In 1957, Symphony of the Air concerts or recordings used 80% or more veteran NBC Symphony musicians. Some 70 of the 75 players having steady "binder contracts" were former NBC players; when more were needed for an engagement, it was reported "the SOA tries whenever possible to obtain ex-NBC musicians on a free-lance basis."

In 1960, the CBS Television network also featured the Symphony of the Air in its televised prime-time special Spring Festival of Music under the direction of the conductor Alfredo Antonini. In collaboration with the concert pianist John Browning, producer Robert Herridge and director Roger Englander, the orchestra presented a virtuoso live presentation of Sergei Rachmaninoff's Second Piano Concerto.

For nearly a decade, the Symphony of the Air performed many concerts led by Stokowski, the orchestra's music director from 1955. The orchestra recorded widely (on RCA Victor, Columbia, Vanguard and United Artists) under leading conductors, including Stokowski, Bernstein, Monteux, Fritz Reiner, Bruno Walter, Kirill Kondrashin, Sir Thomas Beecham, Alfred Wallenstein and Josef Krips. Only once more did they use their old name, the NBC Symphony Orchestra, in the 1963 telecast of Gian Carlo Menotti's written-for-television opera, Amahl and the Night Visitors, with an all-new cast. The orchestra disbanded in 1963.
