= Sergei Istomin =

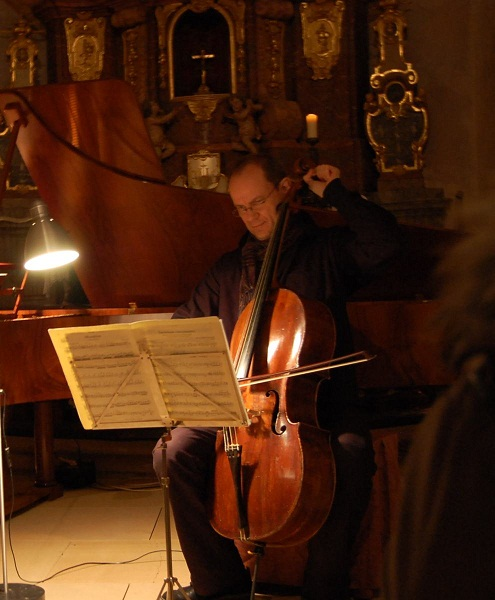
- Born: Potsdam, Germany
- Occupations: violoncello and viola da gamba player

Sergei Istomin (Russian: Сергей Хохлов, or Истомин, Сергей Николаевич) is a cellist and a viola da gamba player. He began his violoncello studies at the age of six at the Gnessin School for gifted children in Moscow, Russia, where he obtained his bachelor's degree (violoncello class of Mrs. V. Birina). He completed his master's degree at the Moscow Tchaikovsky Conservatory in the class of Valentin Feigin and then later his post-graduate studies with Catharina Meints Caldwell at the Oberlin Conservatory of Music (Oberlin, Ohio, USA) and August Wenzinger at the Oberlin Baroque Performance Institute (BPI). In 2018 he received his Doctor of Arts (Music) degree at the Ghent University, Belgium. His doctoral thesis "Variations on a Rococo theme, Op.33: Pyotr Tchaikovsky and Karl Friedrich Wilhelm Fitzenhagen: a creative collaboration. Moscow and Saint Petersburg violoncello schools in the light of European traditions: a historical and textological clarification" is in the field of historically informed performance practice and musicology.

Sergei Istomin has performed solo and chamber music recitals in many European and North American Festivals. His repertoire includes baroque, classical, romantic and contemporary music on both period and modern instruments.

Sergei Istomin has recorded for Sony Classical; Analekta, CBC (Canada), Centaur Records, Music and Arts Programs of America (USA); Passacaille Records (Belgium) and Zig-Zag Territoires (France).

Sergei Istomin lives in Belgium.

== Recordings ==
- Pyotr Tchaikovsky: Variations on a Rococo Theme, Op. 33 and Piano Trio, Op. 50
- Franz Schubert: the Piano Trios. Centaur Records
- Fryderyk Chopin: Complete works for cello and piano. Sergei Istomin & Viviana Sofronitsky, Passacaille records
- Joseph Haydn: Cello concertos with Apollo Ensemble | David Rabinovich (Passacaille Musica Vera)
- Felix Mendelssohn: Complete works for cello and fortepiano with Viviana Sofronitsky (fortepiano) Passacaille Musica Vera
- "Virtuoso Solos for Viola da Gamba" (Abel, Schenk, Telemann) Analekta, fleurs de lys FL 2 3144
- J.S. Bach: Six Suites a Violoncello Solo senza Basso Analekta, fleurs de lys FL 2 3114 - 5
- Franz Liszt: Pièces Tardives Zig-Zag Territoires / Harmonia Mundi ZZT 040902
- J.S. Bach: Notenbüchlein für Anna Magdalena Bach extraits / a selection], Analekta, AN 2 8251
- C.P.E. Bach: Trio Sonatas Music at the Court of Frederick the Great Musique à la cour de Frédéric le Grand CBC Records, MVCD 1117
- "Clérambault," CBC Records, Musica Viva MVCD 1152
- "Gardens of Versailles," Artifact Music
- "An Hour with C.P.E. Bach," Music and Arts Programs of America CD - 1037
