= Beaux Arts Trio =

Piano trio

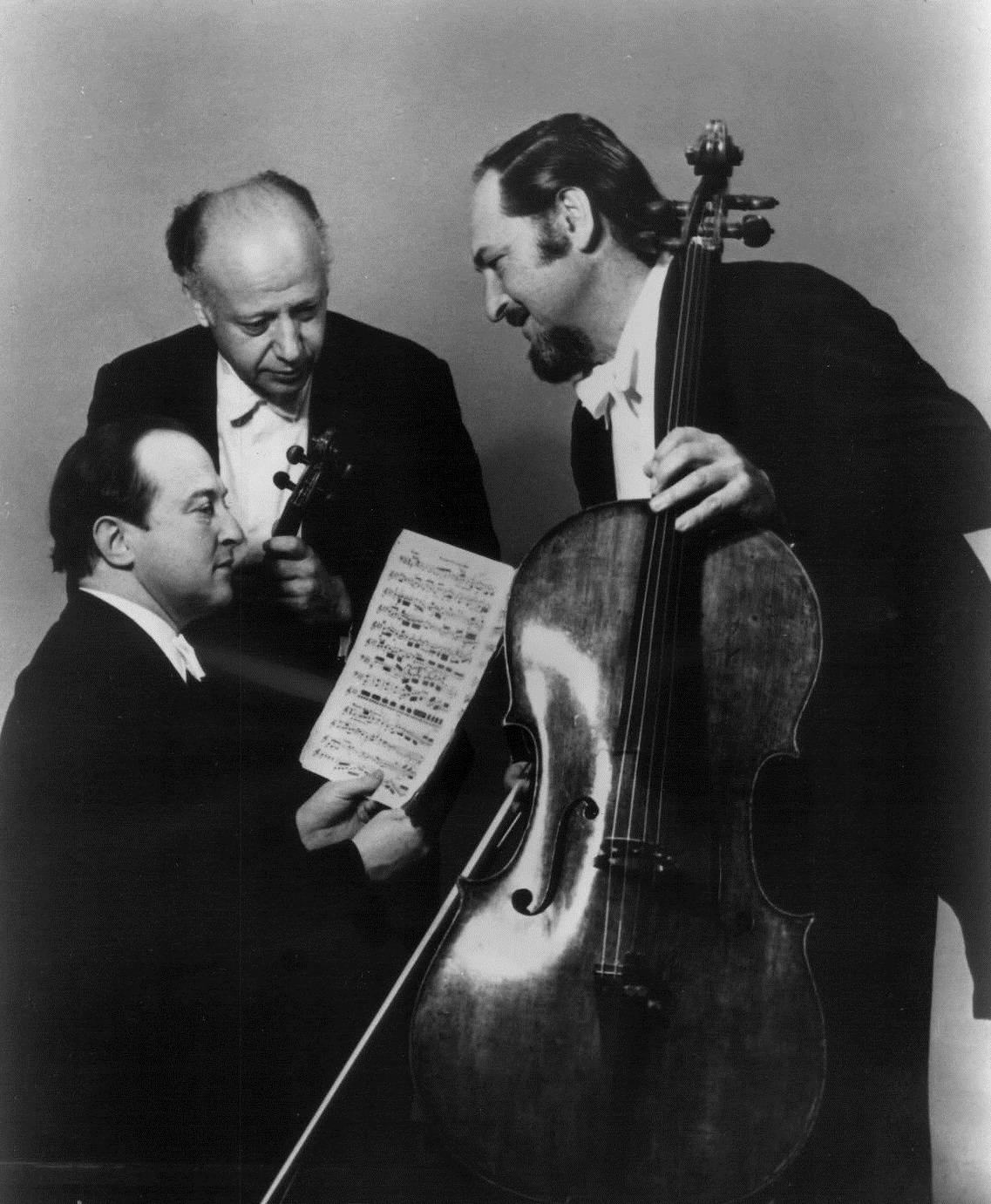
- The trio in 1980, Menahem Pressler, Isidore Cohen, Bernard Greenhouse

Background information
- Origin: U.S.
- Years active: 1955–2008

The Beaux Arts Trio was a noted piano trio, celebrated for their emotional depth and wide-ranging repertoire. They made their debut on 13 July 1955, at the Berkshire Music Festival, Lenox, Massachusetts, United States, known today as the Tanglewood Music Center. Their final American concert was held at Tanglewood on 21 August 2008. It was webcast live and archived on NPR Music. Their final concert was in Lucerne, Switzerland, on 6 September 2008.

The Beaux Arts Trio recorded the entire standard piano trio repertoire. In 2005, the trio celebrated its 50th anniversary with two special CD issues, one featuring their most popular releases through their long years of recording (released by Philips Records), and the other an anniversary collection of new music (released by Warner Records).

== Members ==
Throughout its existence, the trio was held together by founding pianist Menahem Pressler. The original members of the trio when it was founded in 1955 were as follows:

- piano: Menahem Pressler
- violin: Daniel Guilet
- cello: Bernard Greenhouse

The violin and cello members changed on a number of occasions, with later members including the following:

- violin: Isidore Cohen (1968–1992; formerly second violinist of the Juilliard String Quartet), Ida Kavafian (1992–1998), Yung Uck Kim (1998–2002), Daniel Hope (2002–2008)
- cello: Peter Wiley (1987–1998, he then moved to Guarneri Quartet), Antonio Meneses (1998–2008)

In July 2015, Decca Classics released a 60-CD boxed set to mark their 60th anniversary.
