= Menahem Pressler =

Israeli-American pianist (1923–2023)

- מנחם פרסלר
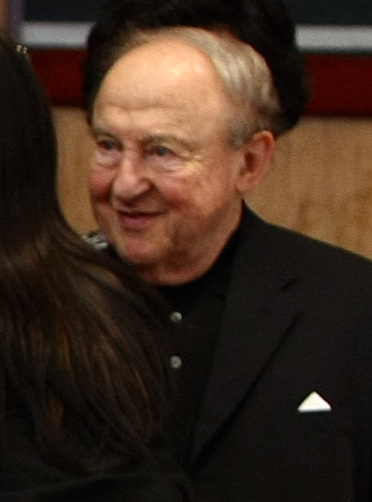
- Pressler in 2009
- Born: 16 December 1923; Magdeburg, Province of Saxony, Prussia, German Reich
- Died: 6 May 2023 (aged 99); London, England
- Occupations: Classical pianist; academic teacher
- Organizations: Beaux Arts Trio; Jacobs School of Music
- Spouse: Sara Scherchen (m. 1949; died 2014)
- Awards: International Classical Music Awards; Order of Merit of the Federal Republic of Germany
- Website: menahempressler.org

Menahem Pressler (Hebrew: מנחם פרסלר; 16 December 1923 – 6 May 2023) was a German-born Israeli-American pianist and university instructor. He co-founded the Beaux Arts Trio in 1955 and performed with the group until its dissolution in 2008, playing in hundreds of recordings and concerts. He taught at Indiana University Bloomington, and his playing was described as focused on elegance, delicacy, and clarity.

== Early life ==
Born Max Jakob Pressler in Magdeburg on 16 December 1923, he began taking piano lessons at age six. Pressler was Jewish; his parents owned a shop for men's clothing that was destroyed by the Nazis during the 9 November 1938 pogrom, euphemistically called the "Night of Broken Glass". The family fled Nazi Germany in 1939, initially to Fascist Italy, and then to Haifa in Mandatory Palestine (now Israel). The young Pressler suffered from eating disorders and was in danger of starvation, later recalling that hearing Beethoven's Piano Sonata No. 31 helped cure him. His grandparents, uncles, aunts, and cousins died in Nazi concentration camps during the Holocaust.

Pressler began to use the Hebrew name Menahem as his given name. He participated in the Debussy International Piano Competition in San Francisco in 1946 and won, which launched his career, and he moved to the US. His Carnegie Hall debut subsequently followed in 1947, playing Schumann's Piano Concerto with the Philadelphia Orchestra conducted by Eugene Ormandy.

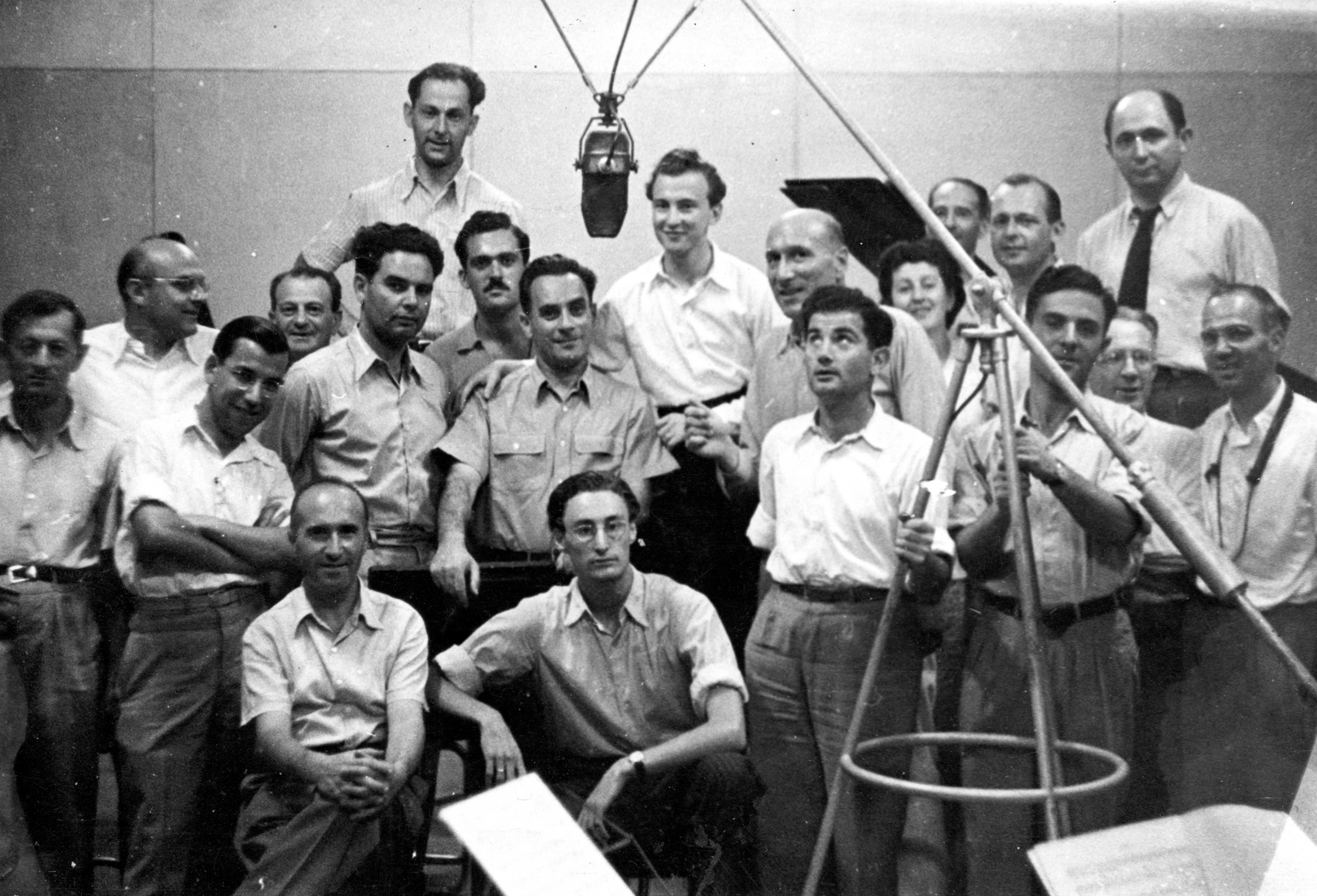
Palestine Broadcasting Service studio in Jerusalem, July 1947, after the performance of Schumann's Piano Concerto, with Pressler right of the microphone

== Career ==
Pressler pursued a career as a soloist. He toured playing with leading orchestras in North America and Europe, including Chicago, Cleveland, Dallas, New York, Pittsburgh, San Francisco, Brussels, Helsinki, London, Oslo, and Paris. From 1955, Pressler taught on the piano faculty at the Jacobs School of Music at Indiana University Bloomington, where he held the rank of Distinguished Professor of Music as the Charles Webb Chair. His debut as a chamber musician was at the 1955 Berkshire Festival, where he appeared as the pianist with violinist Daniel Guilet and cellist Bernard Greenhouse. They met to record a cycle of Mozart's piano trios. It proved so successful that they stayed together as the Beaux Arts Trio. He was the only original member to perform with the group through its entire existence, including several changes of membership, up to disbanding in 2008.

The trio performed in hundreds of recordings and thousands of concerts. They began recording a cycle of the piano trios by Maurice Ravel and Gabriel Fauré. Their repertoire also included contemporary music by Charles Ives and Ned Rorem, among others, and they played ensemble music for six and even eight players.

Pressler returned to Germany in 2008 on the occasion of the 70th anniversary of Kristallnacht. In 2010, he played at the Rheingau Musik Festival with Antônio Meneses, the last cellist of the Beaux Arts Trio, and appeared before in the interview series Rendezvous. In December 2013, aged 90, he made his debut with the Berlin Philharmonic at their New Year's Eve concert. The performance was televised live throughout the world.

At the beginning of the 1950s, Pressler recorded a substantial quantity of solo piano music, and of music for piano and orchestra by various composers for the American label MGM. The Beaux Arts Trio made an extensive series of recordings for Philips. In addition, Pressler recorded solo piano music commercially on the La Dolce Volta label and Deutsche Grammophon. In 2018, he dedicated his last Deutsche Grammophon recording of French musicmusic, "Clair de Lune" (see web page) to his constant companion Annabelle Whitestone, Baroness Weidenfeld.

== Personal life ==
Pressler was married to Sara Scherchen from 1949 until her death in 2014, with whom he had two children. In 2016, he began a relationship with Annabelle Whitestone, Baroness Weidenfeld, whom he had known since 1966.

Pressler divided his time between Bloomington, Indiana, and London. He died in London on 6 May 2023, at age 99.

== Awards and recognition ==
Among his honors and awards, Pressler received honorary doctorates from the University of Nebraska, the San Francisco Conservatory of Music, the Royal Academy of Music in London, the North Carolina School of the Arts, and the Ben Gurion University.

In 2005, Pressler received the Order of Merit of the Federal Republic of Germany, the nation's highest honour, and was named a Commandeur of France's Order of Arts and Letters award. He was appointed an Honorary Fellow of the Jerusalem Academy of Music and Dance, in recognition of a lifetime of performance and leadership in music, in 2007.

He was nominated for five Grammy Awards. He received a Chamber Music America's Distinguished Service Award, the Gold Medal of Merit from the National Society of Arts and Letters. He was also a member of the American Academy of Arts and Sciences.

Pressler received lifetime achievement awards from Gramophone magazine, the International Classical Music Awards, ECHO Classic in Germany, and Les Victoires de la Musique Classique in France.
