= Peter Wiley =

Peter Wiley (born 1955) is a cellist and cello teacher. He entered the Curtis Institute of Music at 13 years of age, where he studied with David Soyer. He was then appointed principal cellist of the Cincinnati Symphony at age 20, after one year in the Pittsburgh Symphony.

He has been awarded an Avery Fisher Career Grant and was nominated with the Beaux Arts Trio for a Grammy Award in 1998 and for another award with the Guarneri String Quartet in 2009. As a member of the Beaux Arts Trio, Wiley performed over a thousand concerts, including appearances with many of the world's greatest orchestras.

He continues his association with the Marlboro Music Festival, dating from 1971. He has also been a faculty artist at Caramoor's "Rising Stars" program and has taught at the Cincinnati College-Conservatory of Music, Mannes College of Music, and Manhattan School of Music. He is currently on the faculty of the Bard College Conservatory of Music and the Curtis Institute of Music. He became the cellist of the Guarneri Quartet in 2001, succeeding David Soyer, and remained until the group's retirement in 2009. He is one of the founders of the Opus One Piano Quartet. He plays a Venetian cello by Matteo Goffriller.
