= Orion String Quartet =

American string quartet

The Orion String Quartet was a string quartet formed in 1987, which continued performing until 2024. It was the quartet-in-residence of New York's Mannes College The New School for Music. The members were Todd and Daniel Phillips, brothers who alternated on first and second violin, violist Steven Tenenbom and cellist Timothy Eddy. Members of the quartet teach at the Curtis Institute of Music, Cleveland Institute of Music, Mannes, Juilliard, Queens College, and the Bard College Conservatory of Music.
