= Daniel Guilet =

French musician

Daniel Guilet (born Daniel Guilevitch, Russian: Russian: Даниил Гилевич, January 10, 1899 – October 14, 1990) was a French, and later, American, classical violinist, best known for being a founding member of the Beaux Arts Trio.

He was born at Rostov-on-Don in the Russian Empire and raised in Paris, where his family moved when he was less than a year old. His teachers at the Conservatoire de Paris included George Enescu and Guillaume Rémy. He played in the Calvet Quartet and as a soloist, and toured France with Maurice Ravel playing his accompaniments.

He immigrated in 1941 to the U.S. in his forties, and changed his surname to Guilet. Next year he organized a string quartet bearing his own surname. In 1944, he joined the NBC Symphony Orchestra, under conductor Arturo Toscanini; Guilet became concertmaster in 1951, and continued in that position in 1954 when Toscanini retired and the orchestra was renamed the Symphony of the Air.

Also in 1954, he invited cellist Bernard Greenhouse to join him and Menahem Pressler, with whom Guilet had previously made recordings, in playing informally—supposedly, as Greenhouse put it 25 years later, just "to play some Mozart". As it turned out, they named their group the Beaux Arts Trio, and began playing in public at Tanglewood in 1955. The ensemble built an international reputation, and (at the time of his death 35 years later, and 30 after his retirement) The New York Times described it as still the "most prominent trio" in chamber music, anywhere.

Guilet retired from performing in 1969, retiring from teaching at Indiana University at the same time; he then moved to teaching at the University of Oklahoma. He also taught at the Manhattan School of Music, the Royal Conservatory of Music in Montreal, and Baylor University. He died following a cerebral hemorrhage at the age of 91.
