= Andor Toth =

American violinist and conductor (1925–2006)

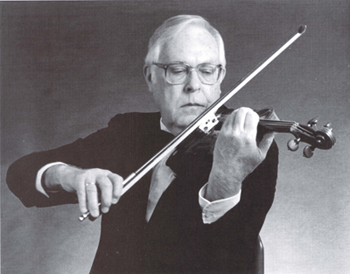
Toth in 1999

Andor John Toth (June 16, 1925 – November 28, 2006) was an American classical violinist, conductor and educator with a musical career spanning over six decades. Toth played his violin on the World War II battlefields of Aachen, Germany; performed with the NBC Symphony Orchestra under Arturo Toscanini in 1943 at age 18; and formed several chamber music ensembles, including the Oberlin String Quartet, the New Hungarian Quartet, and the Stanford String Quartet.

For 15 years he was the violinist in the Alma Trio. Toth conducted orchestras in Cleveland, Denver, and Houston. In 1969, he was the founding concertmaster of the Los Angeles Chamber Orchestra under Neville Marriner. Toth taught at five colleges and universities, and recorded for Vox, Decca Records, and Eclectra Records.

== Early life and education ==
Toth was born in Manhattan on June 16, 1925, the son of Hungarian immigrants. Toth began playing violin as a child. While he was still a graduate student at the Juilliard School, he launched his career in 1942 at age 17 as solo violinist with the original Ballets Russes. In 1943 at age 18, he joined the NBC Symphony Orchestra under Arturo Toscanini. At Juilliard he studied with Hans Letz (formerly of the Kneisel Quartet and a student of Joseph Joachim) and Ivan Galamian.

Toth was married to Louise Rose, a soprano, who died in 2005. The couple had three sons: Andor Jr., a cellist; Thomas, a software engineer; and Chris, a programmer and network administrator. He formed the Toth Duo (violin and cello) with Andor Jr., his eldest son; they recorded the Duo for Violin and Cello, Op. 7, by Zoltán Kodály. Andor Jr. died in 2002 following a year-long battle with cancer.

== Career ==
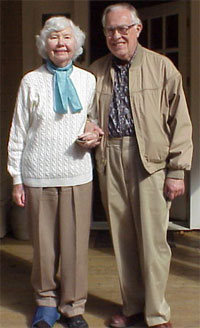
Andor and Louise Rose Toth in September 1999

Toth was associate concertmaster of the Cleveland Orchestra under George Szell and concertmaster Josef Gingold. He was associate conductor of the Houston Symphony under Efrem Kurtz and Ferenc Fricsay before joining the Oberlin faculty in 1955. In 1955, Toth formed the Oberlin String Quartet with violinist Matthew Raimondi, violist William Berman, and cellist John Frazer. In 1957, violinist John Dalley (second violinist in the Guarneri Quartet), and cellist Peter Howard (for many years principal cellist in the Saint Paul Chamber Orchestra) joined the Quartet. In Summer 1958 the Oberlin String Quartet won fourth prize in the Concours International de Quatuor, sponsored by Queen Elizabeth Music Competition, in Liege, Belgium.

In 1963, Toth joined the Alma Trio with pianist Adolph Baller and cellist Gabor Rejto, following the death of violinist Maurice Wilk. After the retirement of Adolph Baller, William Corbett Jones became the pianist. Toth remained with the Alma Trio until 1976 when it disbanded.

Toth founded the New Hungarian Quartet in 1972 with Richard Young, violin; Denes Koromzay, viola (1913–2001), formerly violist in the Hungarian Quartet; and Andor Toth, Jr., cello (1948–2002), formerly principal cellist of the San Francisco Symphony under conductor Josef Krips. All members were faculty at the Oberlin Conservatory. From 1975 until 1979 the quartet was the first faculty quartet-in-residence at the Taos School of Music in Taos, New Mexico.

In 1984, Toth founded the Stanford String Quartet with cellist Stephen Harrison, violinist Mayumi Ohira, and violist Don Ehrlich. The quartet performed internationally until his retirement from Stanford in 1989.

In the summer of 1992, Toth toured Europe playing first violin with another Hungarian string quartet, the Takács Quartet.

== Education career ==
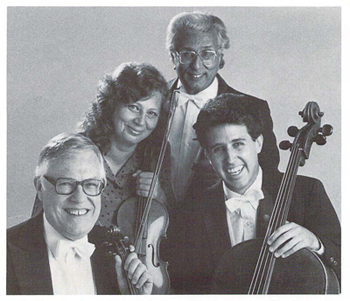
The original Stanford String Quartet, 1984: Toth, violin; Zoya Leybin, violin; Bernard Zaslav, viola; Stephen Harrison, cello

- Oberlin Conservatory of Music (1955–1960);
- during the year 1960/61 he was conductor of Leonard Bernstein's musical West Side Story in New York City;
- San Fernando Valley State College, now California State University, Northridge (1961–1963);
- University of Colorado Boulder (1963–1968);
- University of Texas at Austin (1968–1972);
- Oberlin Conservatory of Music (1972–1978); and
- Stanford University in Palo Alto, California (1978–1989).

While at Oberlin in 1958, he founded and conducted the Oberlin Chamber Orchestra. At Colorado, he founded the Baroque Chamber Ensemble that performed important Baroque works, including The Four Seasons with Toth as soloist.

In June 1967, he taught and played at the New College of Florida in Sarasota, Florida, for the first year of the Experimental Instrumental Performance Clinic, an event that became the Sarasota Music Festival. In the summer of 1968, Toth performed and taught at the Rocky Ridge Music Center in Estes Park, Colorado.

After moving to the San Francisco Bay Area in 1978, Toth also taught briefly at the San Francisco Conservatory of Music and directed the Morrison Artist Series.

In September 1982, The New York Times critic John Rockwell wrote about Toth's last New York concert: "Mr. Toth's principal virtue is his ability to invest even the most brilliant of passages with thoughtfulness; every phrase sounded shaped and considered, with a rich, ample tone ... And Mr. Toth is hardly one of those violinistic poets who wins one over despite an erratic technique; his intonation and articulation were secure in a way that was continually impressive yet never called undue attention to itself."

In 1988, Toth led the Stanford Symphony on a student-organized tour of South-East Asia, its first ever anywhere. The orchestra played in South Korea, Japan and Singapore, drawing a tremendous response and setting the model for numerous tours since. While in Singapore, Toth and his associate conductor Charles Barber honored two lifelong dreams by drinking Singapore Slings at the famous Long Bar in Raffles Hotel. The concert later that afternoon was rescued by its players.

In 1989, while at Stanford University, Toth led the conducting studio, the Stanford Symphony Orchestra, and the Stanford Chamber Orchestra in several recordings and was an exceptionally generous mentor. Toth conducted the world premiere of Tenor Rhapsody, composed by William Thomas McKinley as a commission from the Stanford Symphony for saxophonist Stan Getz, also teaching at Stanford at that time.

Toth frequently amused his students (among them Charles Barber, Jennifer Brown, Peter Jaffe, Christopher Lanz, Jeanine Wagar) with a wry wit and an astonishing command of stride piano.

Toth retired at Stanford University in 1989. Following his retirement, he taught for one year at University of Arizona, then at the University of Houston from 1995 to 1998, and then moved to Friday Harbor, Washington, on San Juan Island. In Friday Harbor he founded Chamber Music San Juans, a successful chamber music series that still is thriving. He also presented annual children's concerts for area schools.

== Students ==
Toth, violin, with John Frazier, cello, at The Oberlin Conservatory, c. 1959

Toth taught a large number of students during his 35-year career in higher education. Many of them occupy important positions in orchestras and higher education as performers, teachers, conductors, and in allied professions. As a teacher, Toth had very specific ideas about tone production, bow control, left hand finger placement and motion, vibrato, and all other facets of a well-developed artistic technique. His ability to use bow speed and weight with almost limitless variation to create phrasing and subtle tone variations was a hallmark of his own playing and his teaching. His musicianship was legendary. John Rockwell (in The New York Times review cited below) described Toth as a "violinistic poet". Some of his many prominent students include:

- Stephen Clapp, Dean of the Juilliard School and violinist in the Beaux Arts String Quartet that won the 1965 Walter W. Naumburg Foundation award in Chamber Music; former dean of the Aspen Music Festival and School.
- David Zinman, conductor emeritus of the Baltimore Symphony Orchestra and music director of the Aspen Music Festival and School; founder and director of the American Academy of Conducting at the Aspen Music Festival and School.
- Fred Nelson, former member of the Quebec Symphony Orchestra (1968), the Montreal Symphony Orchestra (1968–70), and the Vancouver Symphony Orchestra (1970–73. Violinist in the Purcell Quartet (1970–76), concertmaster of the Saskatoon Symphony Orchestra (1976–78); member of the Seattle Symphony (1979–81); and concertmaster of the Symphonie Canadiana (1981–85). Nelson has performed many concertos with orchestra, including those by Beethoven, Mendelssohn, Henryk Wieniawski, Mozart, and Paganini.
- Dr. Paul Roby, violinist, violist, conductor, was a student of Toth at Oberlin Conservatory from 1955 until graduation in 1958. Roby has taught in many universities, including the University of Oklahoma and Kansas State University at Manhattan, Kansas. He was the owner and director of Point CounterPoint Chamber Music Camp, Lake Dunmore, Vermont, for eighteen years. Roby was the concertmaster of the Shreveport Symphony Orchestra and has performed as soloist and chamber musician throughout the United States.
- Rick Lohmann, violin, studied with Toth at Oberlin from 1973 until 1977. He was formerly a concerto soloist and concertmaster with the Omaha Symphony from 1985 until 2000. Lohmann currently is co-director of Santa Fe Talent Education.
- Charles Barber, conductor, AM, DMA Stanford, and later a student of the renowned Carlos Kleiber is conductor and artistic director of City Opera of Vancouver, British Columbia, and founder and guest conductor of the Civic Orchestra of Victoria, British Columbia.
- Dr. Mary Ogletree, professor of violin at Kutztown University of Pennsylvania in Kutztown, Pennsylvania, studied with Mischa Mischakoff at the Aspen Music Festival and School and with Toth at Stanford University. "Andor Toth was generous (those marathon lessons, and the music he gave me, with all his markings!), a hard but fair taskmaster, and an inspiration. He compares only with Mischa Mischakoff, my other favorite teacher (at the Aspen Music Festival and School). None of us who were lucky enough to study with him will ever forget him."
- Rodney Schmidt, violinist, educator and university administrator. BM Oberlin Conservatory (1961); MA California State University at Northridge (1962); DMA University of Colorado (1972), studied violin with Toth at each institution. "Andor was an incredibly sensitive and complete musician. He was a consummate teacher who gave his all to his students."

== Death ==
Toth died of a stroke in Los Angeles, California, on November 28, 2006. He was 81 years old.

== Selected discography ==
Laurel Records: Stanford String Quartet

1. William Bolcom: Tenth String Quartet
2. Ben Johnston (composer): String Quartet No 9
3. Marc Neikrug: String Quartet Stars in the Mirror (Laurel)

Laurel Records: Stanford String Quartet

1. Frank Bridge: Quartet No. 1 in e
2. Darius Milhaud: Quartet No. 7 in B-flat
3. Gabriel Fauré: Quartet, No. 121

Eclectra Records, 1999: Duos For Violin And Cello / Toth Duo

1. Duo for Violin and Cello, Op. 7 by Zoltán Kodály
2. Duo for Violin and Cello no 1, H 157 by Bohuslav Martinů
3. Sonata for Violin and Cello by Maurice Ravel

Arkiv Music VoxBox CDX 5022: Schubert, String Quartets / New Hungarian Quartet
Andor Toth (Violin), Richard Young (Violin), Denes Koromzay (Viola), Andor Toth Jr. (Cello)

1. String Quartet No. 13 (Schubert) in A minor, D 804/Op. 29 no 1 "Rosamunde"
2. String Quartet No. 14 (Schubert) in D minor, D 810 "Death and the Maiden"
3. String Quartet No. 15 (Schubert) in G major, D 887/Op. 161
4. Quartettsatz in C minor, D 703/Op. posthumous

VoxBox (Classical) CD3X 3012: Beethoven, The Middle Quartets / New Hungarian Quartet
Andor Toth (Violin), Richard Young (Violin), Denes Koromzay (Viola), Andor Toth Jr. (Cello)

1. String Quartet No. 7 (Beethoven) in F major ("Rasumovsky 1"), Op. 59/1
2. String Quartet No. 8 (Beethoven) in E minor ("Rasumovsky 2"), Op. 59/2
3. String Quartet No. 9 (Beethoven) in C major ("Rasumovsky 3"), Op. 59/3
4. String Quartet No. 10 (Beethoven) in E-flat major ("Harp"), Op. 74
5. String Quartet No. 11 (Beethoven) in F minor ("Serioso"), Op. 95

VoxBox (Classical) CDX 3031: Debussy and Ravel Quartets / New Hungarian Quartet
Second CD of 3-CD Set. Andor Toth (Violin), Richard Young (Violin), Denes Koromzay (Viola), Andor Toth Jr. (Cello)

1. String Quartet (Debussy) in G minor, Op. 10
2. String Quartet (Ravel)
