= Adolph Baller =

Austrian-American pianist

Adolph Baller (July 30, 1909 – January 23, 1994) was an Austrian-American pianist who played classical and romantic music. He performed with Yehudi Menuhin for several years, toured internationally for decades with the Alma Trio, and was a renowned piano teacher at Stanford and the San Francisco Conservatory of Music.

== Early years ==
Baller was born July 30, 1909, in Brody, which at the time was in the Austro-Hungarian empire and is now in western Ukraine. At age 8, he went to Vienna to study piano with a former student of Franz Liszt. When he was 13 he gave his first solo performance, with the Vienna Philharmonic, following it with performances in all major European capitals.

In March 1938, Nazi soldiers learned that he was a pianist and a Jew. They arrested him, beat him and crushed his hands. Baller's fiancée, Edith Strauss-Neustadt, interceded on his behalf with the Polish Consul in Vienna and helped to restore his hands through a long treatment so that he could resume his career. The couple escaped to Budapest, where they were married before coming to the United States in 1938.

== Career ==
While Baller worked as a pianist for the WQXR radio station in New York City, he met violinist Yehudi Menuhin and cellist Gabor Rejto. Beginning in 1941, the Ballers lived with their daughter, Nina, at Menuhin's Alma Estate in Los Gatos, California.

For several years Baller accompanied Menuhin in performances throughout the world and performed in chamber concerts, being particularly active during World War II with performances for troops deployed overseas.

Under Yehudi Menuhin's patronage, Baller, Gabor Rejto and Roman Totenberg formed the Alma Trio in 1942–1943 at Menuhin's Alma estate in Los Gatos, California. Violinist Maurice Wilk joined the Alma Trio after Totenberg retired. Following Wilk's sudden death in 1963, violinist Andor Toth joined the Alma Trio and remained their violinist for the next 15 years, before the trio wound down their touring in the mid-1980s.

== Later years ==
Baller served as a faculty member at Stanford University for over 30 years. Among his most notable students were pianists Jerome Rose, William Corbett Jones, Xenia Boodberg Lee and Nohema Fernández.

In 1984, the Music Guild at Stanford created an endowment fund in his honor, providing scholarship assistance to piano students at Stanford.

He died at his home in Palo Alto on January 23, 1994, aged 84.
