= William Corbett-Jones =

American pianist

William Corbett-Jones is an American pianist who has performed throughout the United States, Canada, Mexico and Central America, Europe, Africa, Australia, New Zealand, the Philippines, Taiwan, and Singapore.

== Education ==
Corbett-Jones' private teachers include Adolph Baller, Alexander Libermann, Egon Petri, Lili Kraus, and Dario De Rosa, pianist of the Trio di Trieste at the Accademia Musicale Chigiana, Siena, Italy. He has participated in master classes given by Olga Samaroff, Ernest Bloch, Pablo Casals, Rosina Lhévinne, Lotte Lehmann, Ilona Kabos, János Starker, Christoph Eschenbach, Malcolm Frager, Jean-Philippe Collard, Adele Marcus and Guido Agosti.

== Performance ==
Corbett-Jones performed as pianist in the Alma Trio from 1971 until 1976, following the retirement of his teacher and the Alma Trio's founding pianist, Adolph Baller.

Among the artists with whom Corbett-Jones has performed are:

- Violinists: Henri Temianka, Berl Senofsky, Salvatore Accardo, and Tossy Spivakovsky, Christian Ferras, Hansheinz Schneeberger and Mischa Elman, Andor Toth and Jacob Krachmalnick, Camilla Wicks, Pierre D'Archambeau, Jassen Todorov; also rehearsal pianist for Joseph Szigeti and Yehudi Menuhin
- Violists: Paul Yarbrough, Andras Toszeghi, Ernst Wallfisch
- Cellists: Laszlo Varga, Gábor Rejtő, Joseph Shuster, Claude Starck, and Christine Walevska, William Van Den Burg, Margaret Tait
- Clarinetists: David Glazer, Rosario Mazzeo, Rudolf Stalder
- Flutists: Paul Renzi, Peter-Lukas Graf, Michel Dubos
- Oboist: Heinz Holliger
- Singers: James McCracken, Hilde Rössel-Majdan, Robert Weede, Marilyn Horne, Arthur Loosli
