= Rejtő =

Rejtő is a surname and may refer to:

- Jenő Rejtő (Reich) (pseudonyms: P. Howard, Gibson Lavery; 1905–1943), Hungarian author, science fiction writer, playwright
- Gábor Rejtő (1916–1987), Hungarian cellist
- Ildikó Újlaky-Rejtő (born 1937), Hungarian Olympic and world champion foil fencer
