= Paul Hermann (composer) =

Hungarian composer and cellist (1902–1944)

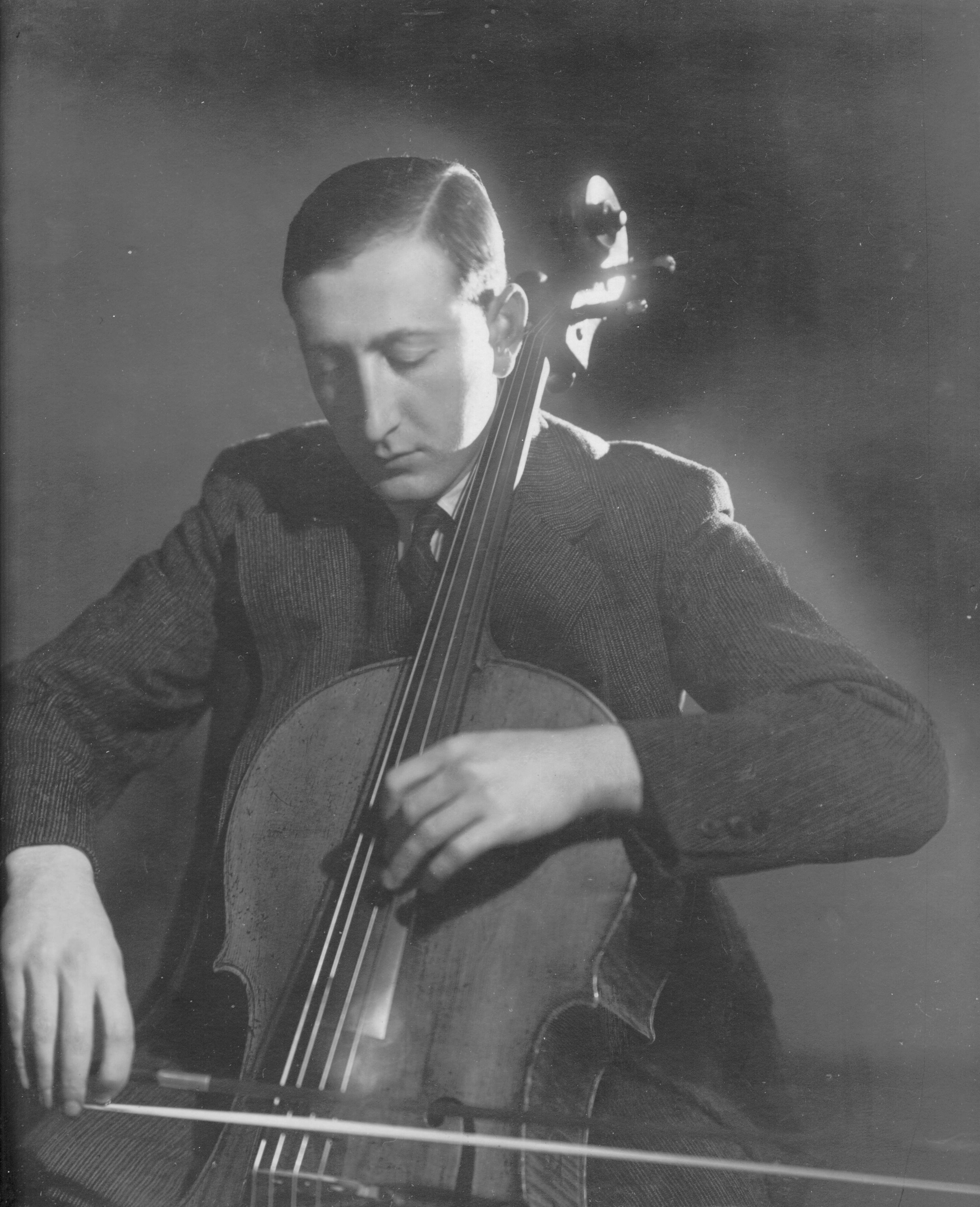
- Hermann, c. 1934
- Born: 27 March 1902; Budapest, Austria-Hungary
- Disappeared: 15 May 1944; Baltic States
- Other name: Pál Hermann
- Education: Royal Hungarian Academy of Music
- Occupations: Cellist; composer
- Years active: 1918–1944
- Style: Classical; chamber
- Partner: Ada Weevers
- Children: Corrie Hermann

Paul Hermann (27 March 1902, Budapest – 1944), also known as Pál Hermann, was a virtuoso cellist and composer.

== Career ==
Hermann was born in Budapest, Austria-Hungary, on 27 March 1902 and came from a Jewish family. About his early childhood, not much more than an anecdote remains: he was only prepared to study for his piano lessons if he was paid one cent for every étude he prepared. He studied at the Royal Hungarian Academy of Music from 1915–1919 and developed close relationships, both musical and personal, with his teachers of composition Béla Bartók and Zoltán Kodály, violinist Zoltán Székely, and pianists Géza Frid and Lili Kraus. There, he studied cello under Adolf Schiffer and composition, first under Leó Weiner, who was also his teacher of chamber music. Already during his studies, Hermann was a frequent performer within and outside of the Academy. He began his international cello career at the age of 16, playing as a soloist in European music venues. Hermann felt that there was no need to finish his studies at the Royal Academy.

Among the works Hermann premiered, or gave notable early performances of, as a virtuoso cellist during the 1920s were Frank Bridge's Cello Sonata in 1927 with Harry Isaacs and Kodaly's Sonata for Solo Cello Op. 8 at Arnold Schoenberg's Society for Private Musical Performances.

Hermann taught cello and composition in the Musikschule Paul Hindemith Neukölln from 1929 to 1934. However, as the political climate in Berlin became more threatening, most notably for Jews, he decided to move first to Brussels, residing there from 1934 to 1937, later to Paris from 1937 to 1939, and then to the southern France. He was deported under the Vichy France régime in February 1944 from Toulouse to the Drancy internment camp, and on 15 May 1944 he was sent to the Baltic States in Drancy Convoy 73 and was not heard of again.

== Personal life ==
During the early years of his career, Hermann visited London for recitals and concerts and then would stay at the De Graaff-Bachiene family residence, owned by patrons of the arts. A story about one of these stays survives: Hermann and his friend Zoltán Székely had entertained a large company of people in the De Graaff household in London in 1928, at the peak of their musical partnership, with a house recital. Later that evening, Hermann had been the centre of attention during the after-concert soirée that followed and had jokingly started to dance with his own cello in his arms. The people applauded and he continued to spin and dance until he fell and his cello broke to pieces. To bring the evening to a happy ending was their host Jaap de Graaff, patron and protector of the arts, who decided to buy a Gagliano cello for Hermann, and a Stradivarius violin for Székely.

On a visit to Holland around 1929, Jaap de Graaff suggested for his niece Ada Weevers, who lived in Amersfoort, to go and see Hermann perform in Amsterdam, and when they met, Ada and Hermann fell in love, despite their different cultures, nationalities and religions. The young couple moved to Berlin in 1930, and they had a daughter, Corrie Hermann, in 1932.

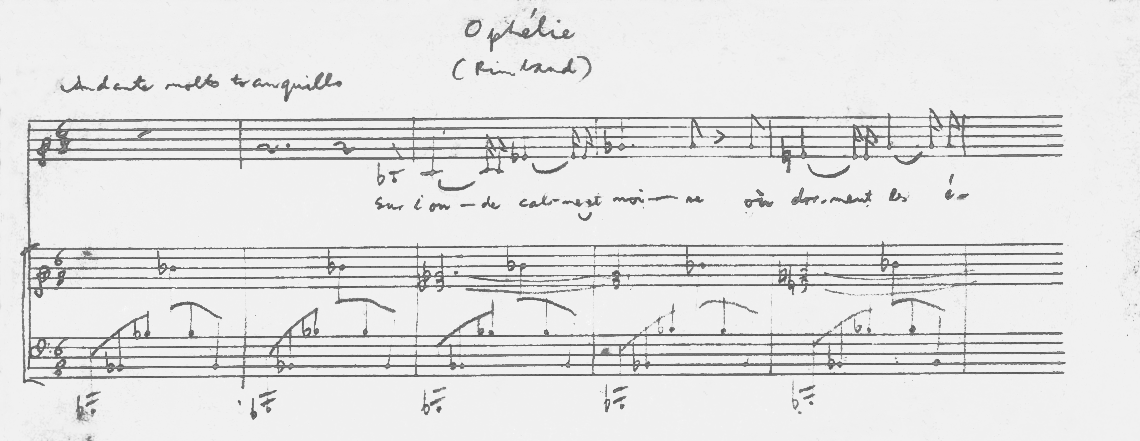
The beginning melody of "Ophélie", composed by Hermann in Toulouse during the Second World War

Ada died after a drowning accident in the North Sea. As the political climate in Berlin for Jews became increasingly threatening, Hermann decided to hide his daughter with his non-Jewish sister-in-law in the Netherlands. Hermann left to work in Brussels from 1934–1937, and in Paris in 1937–1939, under a false name, and then moved to southern France where he was hidden in a farmhouse near Toulouse of the French branch of the Weevers family, where he composed three melodies for voice and piano ("Ophélie", "La Ceinture" and "Dormeuse") and a violin/cello sonata. "Ophélie", based on the character Ophelia in Shakespeare's Hamlet who drowns in a river; this may have been inspired by the tragic drowning of Hermann's wife. He found the solitude of his hidden life on the farm hard to cope with, having lost his wife and far away from his daughter, and visited Toulouse from time to time to teach and socialize, accepting the risk of being discovered.

== Death ==
On one such visit to Toulouse, he was picked up during a street razzia (round-up), transported to the Drancy internment camp in spring 1944, and then sent onward to the Baltic States in Drancy Convoy 73 on 15 May 1944, after which further traces of Hermann are lost.

The Prins Bernhard Cultuurfonds set up the Paul Hermann Fonds in Hermann's memory, which offers scholarships to promising young cellists at the Franz Liszt Academy of Music.

== Compositions ==
"Ophélie"
Hermann's composition "Ophélie", performed by Paul van Gastel (tenor) and Paolo Orlandi (piano) in 2012

Paul Hermann wrote a small number of compositions which are all now in the public domain in Europe.

- "Grand Duo, pour violon et violoncelle" (1929–30)
- "Duo pour violon et violoncelle" (1920, dédié a Zoltán Székely)
- "Trio à cordes" (1921)
- "Toccata, pour piano" (1936)
- "Quatre Épigrammes, pour piano" (1934)
- Trois mélodies sur des textes d'Arthur Rimbaud et de Paul Valéry, extrait de Charmes (1934–39)
  - "Ophélie"
  - "La Ceinture"
  - "La Dormeuse"

== Recordings ==
No recordings of Hermann are known to survive, although he often performed recitals or as a chamber musician with the Hungarian Quartet, with violinist Zoltán Székely and others. Of his concerts and recordings only the programs remain. Hermann was also heard on the radio, for example Wireless World 1937 recounts a broadcast of "Songs You Might Never Have Heard" with Paul Hermann (cello) and John Ireland (piano).

=== Recordings of his compositions ===
- Paul Hermann Forbidden Music in World War II – Cello concerto, Grand Duo für Violine & Cello; Streichtrio; Klaviertrio; Lieder; 4 Epigrammes; Allegro für Klavier; Toccata für Klavier; Suite für Klavier. Performed by Clive Greensmith, Beth Nam, Burkhard Maiss, Bogdan Jianu, Hannah Strijbos, Andrei Banciu, with soprano Irene Maessen Etcetera, DDD, (2CD) 2017
