= Bernard Zaslav =

American violist (1926–2016)

Bernard Zaslav (April 7, 1926 – December 28, 2016) was an American viola soloist and chamber musician with an extensive recording and performance career. A founding member of The Composers Quartet in 1965, he went on to play with the Fine Arts Quartet, Vermeer Quartet, and the Stanford String Quartet. He has also performed and recorded as the Zaslav Duo with his wife, pianist Naomi Zaslav.

== Early life and education ==
Zaslav was born in Brooklyn, New York, and studied at the Juilliard School in 1946 as a violin student of Sascha Jacobsen and Mischa Mischakoff.

== Career ==
=== Performing ===
After further study on the viola with Lillian Fuchs in 1957 at the Yale Summer School of Music at Norfolk, Connecticut, Zaslav continued his career, performing (on viola) with the Cleveland Orchestra under George Szell for two years, subsequently returning to New York to work as a freelance musician

Zaslav continued his career as violist of the Kohon String Quartet, the Composers String Quartet, the Fine Arts String Quartet, the Vermeer String Quartet, the Stanford String Quartet, and the viola/piano Zaslav Duo, together with his wife, Naomi Zaslav. In these ensembles he shared in commissioning, premiering, and recording new works by Elliott Carter, Milton Babbitt, Gunther Schuller, Ralph Shapey, Ruth Crawford Seeger, Roger Sessions, Ursula Mamlok, Henry Weinberg, Billy Jim Layton, Charles Wuorinen, Ben Johnston, Seymour Shifrin, Andrew Imbrie, Samuel Adler, John Downey, Karel Husa, Marc Neikrug, and William Bolcom. His discography comprises 131 works of chamber music and was released on the Vox, Turnabout, Laurel, Music & Arts, Nonesuch, Everest, Gasparo, CRI, Gallante, and Orfeo labels. The Kohon Quartet was awarded the Grand Prix du Disque for Chamber Music from the Académie Charles Cros for their recording of Alban Berg's String Quartet Op. 3 in 1964.

Zaslav performed on a viola made by Giovanni Battista Guadagnini in 1781 in Turin, Italy, and is described as the "ex-Villa". It is one of only ten violas attributed to that maker.

=== Teaching ===
Zaslav has served on the faculties of Columbia University, New York University, Brooklyn College, the University of Wisconsin–Milwaukee, Northern Illinois University, and Stanford University.

=== Writing ===
Bernard Zaslav's memoir, The Viola in My Life: An Alto Rhapsody, was published in 2011 by Science and Behavior Books. The hardcover book includes 2 CDs compiled from his discography.

=== Recording ===
In 1993, Zaslav became a Resident Artist at the Center for Computer Research in Music and Acoustics (CCRMA) at Stanford University, where he learned the digital recording and editing techniques to produce the Zaslav Duo's last series of five CDs for the Music & Arts label. The recordings have received Stereo Review's "Recording of Special Merit" and Devoteé magazine's "Debut Recording–Artist of the Year" designations.

== Discography ==
Zaslav has recorded 131 works of chamber music for the Teldec, Orfeo, Columbia, Nonesuch, Everest, Laurel, Gasparo, Orion, Vox, CRI, and Music & Arts labels.

- w/ The Kohon String Quartet – (20 works) Berg, Alban. String Quartet, Opus 3. LP – DL 730. Vox, 1962. (*Awarded Grand Prix du Disque for Chamber Music, Charles Cros Societé, Paris-1964)
- Hummel, Johann Nepomuk. Quintet for Clarinet and String Quartet, Maria von Weber, Carl – Quintet for Clarinet and String Quartet. The Kohon String Quartet, David Glazer, Clarinet. LP – DL 960. Vox, 1963.
- Dvořák, Antonín. String Quartet in A Major Op. 2, Quartet in a minor, Op. 16; Quartet in D minor, Op. 34; Quartet in E-flat Major, Op. 51; Quartet in C Major, Op. 61; Quartet in E Major, Op. 80; Quartet in F Major, Op. 96; Quartet in A flat Major, Op. 105; Quartet in G Major, Op. 106. LPs – SVBX 549–553. Vox, c. 1963.
- Brahms, Johannes. String Quartet, Op. 51, No 1; Quartet Op. 51, No 2; Quartet Op 67 No. 2; Robert Schumann. String Quartets Op. 41, Nos. 1–3. LPs – VBX 42/SVBX 542. Vox, 1964.
- Ives, Charles. String Quartet No. 1 "A Revival Service," Quartet No. 2. LP – DL 1120/STDL 501.120. Vox, 1965. (* Pioneer release)
- w/ The Composers String Quartet – (2 works) Johnston, Ben. String Quartet No. 2 and John Cage and Lajaren Hiller, HPSCHD. LP – H 71224. Nonesuch Records, 1967.
- Weinberg, Henry. String Quartet No. 2 (with violist Bernard Zaslav), Kirchner, Leon, String Quartet No. 3 (with violist Jean Dupuoy). LP MS 7284. Columbia Records, 1970. (*Henry Weinberg received the Naumberg Foundation award for Chamber Music – 1967)åç
- w/ The Fine Arts String Quartet – (66 works) Haydn, Joseph. String Quartetås, Op. 50, Nos. 1 through 6, "Unfinished Quartet," Op. 103 (Volume 7). LPs – SVBX 595. Vox, 1968–1975.
- Haydn, Joseph. String Quartets, Op. 76, Nos. 1 through 6 (Volume 8). LPs – SVBX 596. Vox, 1968 –1975.
- Haydn, Joseph. String Quartets, Op. 64, Nos. 1 through 6; Op. 2, Nos. 5 and 6; Divertimento, Op. "0” (Volume 9). LPs – SVBX 597. Vox, 1968–1975.
- Haydn, Joseph. String Quartets, Op. 74, Nos. 1 through 6, Op. 3, Nos. 1 through 6 (Volume 10). LPs – 598.Vox, 1968–1975.
- The Romantic Quartets -Schubert, Franz. -String Quartet No. 13, Op. 29, Brahms, Johannes – String Quartet No. 3, Op. 67: LP 3266. Everest, 1970.
- Husa, Karel. String Quartet No. 2; String Quartet No. 3. (*Commissioned for the Fine Arts String Quartet, awarded the Pulitzer Prize for Chamber Music, 1969). LP 3290. Everest, 1971.
- Wuorinen, Charles. First String Quartet, Babbitt, Milton – String Quartet No. 3 (Both works commissioned by the Fine Arts Music Foundation of Chicago 1970–71). LP S34515. Vox BoxTurnabout, 1972.
- Wuorinen, Charles. First String Quartet, Babbitt, Milton – String Quartet No. 3. Reissue: CD 707. Music & Arts, c. 2005.
- Mozart, Wolfgang Amadeus. String Quintet K. 174 in B-flat Major; Quintet K. 406 in C Minor; String Quintet K. 515 in C Major; String Quintet K. 516 inG Minor; String Quintet K. 593 in D Major; String Quintet K. 614 in E flatMajor. The Fine Arts String Quartet, w/ Francis Tursi, viola. LPs SBVX557. Vox, 1974.
- Mozart, Wolfgang Amadeus. String Quintet K. 174 in B-flat Major; Quintet K. 406 in C Minor; String Quintet K. 515 in C Major; String Quintet K. 516 in G Minor; String Quintet K. 593 in D Major; String Quintet K. 614 in E flatMajor. The Fine Arts String Quartet, w/ Francis Tursi, viola. Reissue: CD1159–2. Music & Arts CD, 2005.
- Fine Arts Quartet 30th Anniversary Album -Shostakovich, Dmitri. String Quartet No. 3 in F, Op. 73, Sergei Prokofieff, String Quartet No. 2, Op. 92: (*The Fine Arts Music Foundation of Chicago). LP GS 203, Gasparo, 1978.
- Shostakovich, Dmitri. String Quartet No. 3 in F, Op. 73, Sergei Prokofieff. String Quartet No. 2, Op. 92: Fine Arts Quartet 30th Anniversary Album. Reissue (*The Fine Arts Music Foundation of Chicago). CD GG 2024, Gasparo Gallante, 2006.
- “A Whitman Serenade.” – Adler, Samuel. String Quartet No. 6 The Fine Arts String Quartet, w/ Jan DeGaetani, soprano. LP record 608. CRI, 1979.
- The Fine Arts Quartet at WFMT Radio: Radio broadcast performances – Mozart, Wolfgang Amadeus – String Quartet K. 458, Horn Quintet K. 407, Haydn, Joseph – String Quartets, Op. 1, No. “0;” Op. 2, Nos. 5 and 6; Op. 64, No. 6; Op. 76, No. 4 and 6; Op. 103, Op. 20, No. 5, Shifrin, Seymour – String Quartet No. 4, Husa, Karel – Quartet No. 3: The Fine Arts String Quartet, w/ Barry Tuckwell, French horn: Beethoven, Ludwig van. String Quartets Op. 18, No. 1, Op. 59, Nos. 1 and 2. CD1154 (8 CDs). Music & Arts, 2005.
- Downey, John. String Quartet No. 2, Johnston, Ben -String Quartet No. 4 “Amazing Grace,” (*commissioned by the Fine Arts Music Foundation of Chicago), Crawford-Seeger, Ruth – String Quartet. t. LP GS 205. Gasparo, 1980.
- Downey, John. String Quartet No. 2, Johnston, Ben-String Quartet No. 4“Amazing Grace,” (*commissioned by the Fine Arts Music Foundation of Chicago), Crawford-Seeger, Ruth – String Quartet. Reissue: CD GG-1020. Gallante, 2006.
- w/ The Vermeer String Quartet – (8 works) Schubert, Franz. String Quartet No. 14 “Death and the Maiden;” Quartetsatz in C minor. LP and CD 6.24868 AZ. Teldec 1983.
- Dvořák, Antonín. String Quartet No. 10, Op 51, Verdi, Giuseppe – String Quartet in E mino. – CD 8.43105. Teldec 1983.
- Brahms, Johannes. Clarinet Quintet in B minor, Op. 115, The Vermeer String Quartet, w/ Karl Leister, Clarinet, LP S 068–831. Orfeo, 1983.
- Brahms, Johannes. Clarinet Quintet in B minor, Op. 115, The Vermeer String Quartet, w/ Karl Leister, Clarinet. CD C068–831A. Orfeo, 1983.
- Beethoven, Ludwig van. String Quartet No. 13, Op. 130/133. “Grosse Fuge” – LP 6.42982 AZ, CD ZK. Teldec 1984.
- Beethoven, Ludwig van. String Quartet No. 12, Op 127; No 16, Op. 135 (with violist Richard Young) CD 8.43207 ZK. Teldec 1986.
- w/ The Stanford String Quartet – (6 works) Balcom, William. String Quartet No. 10; Johnston, Ben – String Quartet No. 9; Neikrug, Marc – String Quartet “Stars’ the Mirror.” – CD LR–847. Laurel Records, 1992.
- Three Early 20th Century Quartets: Milhaud, Darius. String Quartet No. 7, Op. 87; Bridge, Frank -Quartet No. 1 in D minor; Fauré, Gabriel – Quartet in E minor Op.121. CD 823. Music & Arts, 1993.
- w/ The Zaslav Duo: Bernard Zaslav, viola. Naomi Zaslav, piano- (28 works) Berry, Wallace. Canto Lirico for Viola and Piano. LP SD 282. CRI, c. 1967.
- French Music for Viola and Piano. -Franck, Cesar, (arr. B. Zaslav). Sonata in A major; Milhaud, Darius – Sonatas #1, 2: LP ORS 75186. Orion Master Recordings, 1976.
- Brahms, Johannes. Sonatas Op. 120, Nos. 1 and 2. LP GS-215. Gasparo, 1980.
- Brahms, Johannes. Sonatas Op. 120, Nos. 1 and 2 (reissue of above); Franck, Cesar (arr. B. Zaslav), Violin Sonata in A major (reissue of Orion ORS 75186). CD 626. Music & Arts, 1990.
- Music for Viola and Piano – Bloch, Ernst: Suite for Viola and Piano (1919); Five Sketches in Sepia for Piano; Suite Hëbraîque for Viola & Piano; In the Night, A Love Poem for Piano; Suite for Viola Solo; Meditation and Processional for Viola and Piano. CD 902, Music & Arts, 1995.
- “Dvořák’s Viola” – Works of Antonín Dvořák transcribed for viola and piano by B. Zaslav. Op. 75, Four Romantic Pieces; Op. 94, Rondo; Op. 2 Four Songs; Op. 31, No. 4 – Song, “All ye that labour”; Op. 31, No. 5, Song, “All through the night”; Op. 100 – Sonatina in G; Op. 68, #5 – Klid (Forest Silence); Op. 55, No. 4 – Song, “As My Mother Taught Me”; Op. 46, No. 2 – Slavonic Dance in g (Dvořák /Kreisler); Op. 11 – Romance – CD 953. Music & Arts, 1996.
- “A Viola Treasury” – Franck, Cesar (arr. B. Zaslav), Sonata in A major (reissue of Music & Arts 626); Milhaud, Darius – Sonata no. 2, Op. 244; “La Bruxelloise” from QuatreVisages (reissue of Orion ORS 75186); Dvořák, Antonín – (arr. B. Zaslav), Songs Op. 31, No. 4 and Op. 31, No. 5, Op. 55 (reissue of Music & Arts 953); Bloch, Ernst – Meditation and Processional; Suite for Solo Viola (reissue of Music & Arts 902); Babbitt, Milton – Composition for Viola and Piano: CD 1151 Music & Arts, 2005.
- “Brahms & Friends” – Brahms, Johannes, – Sonatas Op. 120, Nos. 1&2 (reissue of above); Joachim, Joseph -Variations for viola and piano, Op. 10; Reinecke, Carl – Phantasiestucke for viola and piano, Op. 43; von Herzogenberg, Heinrich – Legenden for viola and piano, Op. 62; Kiel, Freidrich – Drei Romanzen for viola and piano, Op.69; Fuchs, Robert – Sechs Phantasiestucke for viola and piano, Op. 117; Sitt, Hans – Albumblatter for viola and piano, Op. 39: CD 1087–(2) Music & Arts, 2006.
- Various Chamber Works – w/ Bernard Zaslav, viola (3 works) The Art of Harold Gomberg – Britten, Benjamin. Fantasy Quartet for Oboe, Violin, Viola, and Cello, Op. 2: Harold Gomberg, oboe, Matthew Raimondi, violin, Bernard Zaslav, viola, Nathan Stuch, cello. LP VCS 10064.Vanguard Cardinal, 1967.
- Downey, John. What if? A Dolphin; Bernard Zaslav, viola, Daniel Nelson, tenor, Israel Bourakoff, alto flute, Pavel Burda, vibraphone & percussion, John Downey, piano – LP ORS 77267. Orion, 1977.
- Downey, John. What if? A Dolphin; Bernard Zaslav, viola, Daniel Nelson, tenor, Israel Bourakoff, alto flute, Pavel Burda, vibraphone & percussion, John Downey, piano Reissue: CD GSCD 276. Gasparo, 1989.
- w/ Selected Chamber Orchestra Recordings – (8 works) In Dulci Jubilo – A Baroque Concert – Leopold Stokowski, Cond. -Bach, Johann Sebastian.. Jesu, Joy of Man’s Desiring (from Cantata 147), Sinfonia (from the Christmas Oratorio), Sheep May Safely Graze (from Cantata 208); Antonio Vivaldi, Concerto Grosso in D minor, Op. 3, No. 10; Corelli, Arcangelo – Concerto Grosso in G minor, Op. 6, No. 8 LP BGS-70696. Bach Guild, 1967.
- w/ Esterhazy Orchestra – David Blum, Cond. – Haydn, Franz Joseph – Symphonies No. 60 (Il Distratto), No.70, No. 81 – Vanguard Classics- CD OVC 5000
- Naomi Zaslav, Solo Piano (19 works) “The Intimate Brahms” – A treasury of 19 short piano pieces performed by Naomi Zaslav – Brahms, Johannes: Intermezzo, Op. 76, No.3; Capriccio, Op.116, No. 7; Intermezzo, Op.117, No.2; Capriccio, Op. 116, No. 3; Intermezzo, Op. 119, No.1; Intermezzo Op. 119, No. 2; Intermezzo, Op. 117, No. 1; Capriccio, Op. 76, No. 1; Capriccio, Op. 76, No. 8; Intermezzo, Op.116, No. 4; Romance, Op. 118, No. 5; Intermezzo, Op.116, No. 6; Intermezzo, Op. 118, No. 2; Intermezzo, Op.76, No.4; Intermezzo, Op. 118, No. 6; Intermezzo, Op.76, No. 6; Intermezzo, Op.116, No. 2; Intermezzo, Op. 76, No. 7; Ballade, Op. 10, No. 1: CD 1031, Music & Arts 1998.
