= Toth Duo =

Andor Toth, violin, and Andor Toth Jr., cello, in September 1999

The Toth Duo was founded in 1972 by two members of the New Hungarian Quartet: Andor Toth, violin and Andor Toth Jr., cello. The Toth Duo recorded a significant album of Duos for Violin and Cello on the Eclectra label. The Duo actively performed until Andor Toth Jr. died from cancer in 2002.

== Selected discography ==
- ECLECTRA Records, 1999: Duos For Violin And Cello / Toth Duo
1. Duo for Violin and Cello, Op. 7 by Zoltán Kodály
2. Duo for Violin and Cello no 1, H 157 by Bohuslav Martinů
3. Sonata for Violin and Cello by Maurice Ravel
- CD Universe - Duos For Violin And Cello / Toth Duo CD
1. Duo for Violin and Cello, Op. 7 by Zoltán Kodály
2. Duo for Violin and Cello no 1, H 157 by Bohuslav Martinů
3. Sonata for Violin and Cello by Maurice Ravel
