= Végh Quartet =

The Végh Quartet was a Hungarian string quartet founded in 1940 and led by its first violinist Sándor Végh for 40 years. The quartet was based in Budapest until it departed Hungary in 1946. It is particularly known for its recordings of the Beethoven (recorded twice – 1952 mono and 1972-4 stereo) and Bartók cycles. The quartet disbanded in 1980.

== Personnel ==
The personnel from 1940 to 1978 were:

- Sándor Végh (violin)
- Sándor Zöldy (violin)
- Georges Janzer (viola)
- Paul Szabo (cello)

In 1978 Philipp Naegele replaced Sándor Zöldy, and Bruno Giuranna replaced Georges Janzer.

== Origins ==
Sándor Végh, a pupil of Jenő Hubay and Zoltán Kodály at Budapest Academy, led the Hungarian Quartet from its foundation in 1935 until 1937, when he ceded the first violin desk to Zoltán Székely, and went to the second in the place of Péter Szervánsky: Denes Koromzay was the viola and Vilmos Palotai the 'cello. Székely was a friend of Béla Bartók, and the group became rapidly known by giving the premiere performance of the Bartók 5th Quartet, which it studied with the composer. By 1938, the group had been heard in every major city of Western Europe. In 1940 Végh left to found his own quartet.

The Vegh Quartet was founded in Budapest and was based there during the War, but left Hungary in 1946 and settled in Paris. They won the Grand Prix at Geneva at its first international music festival 1946. The 1952 recording of the Beethoven quartets was made in Boston, Massachusetts. The personnel of the quartet remained the same for almost 40 years. Then, in 1978 the second violin and viola left the group. (The original violist, Georges Janzer, and his wife, cellist Eva Czako, went on to teach at the Indiana University School of Music, alongside Czako's childhood teacher, János Starker. The Janzers also made a number of recordings of chamber music with the legendary Belgian violinist Arthur Grumiaux.) They were both replaced, but after two more years the ensemble was disbanded.

In 1958, the Quartet completed an acclaimed tour of Southern Africa.

== Recordings ==
- Beethoven: Quartets, recorded 1952, Les Discophiles Français
- Kodály – String Quartet No. 2, Op. 10, issued 1954. (Decca LP LXT2876: London LP LL-865)*
- Smetana – String Quartet No. 1 in E flat, issued 1954. (Decca LP LXT2876: London LP LL-865)*

(*These reissued in a joint remastering by Dr John Duffy & Andrew Rose, October 2008, for Pristine Audio, PACM061. Personnel: Végh, Zöldy, Janzer, Szabo.)

- Mozart – Quartets no 14 in G major K 387 'Spring': no 15 in D minor K 421 (417b): no 17 in Bb major K 458 'Hunt': no 18 in A major K 464: no 21 in D major K 575: no 23 in F major K 590. Studio recordings in Paris, 1951–1952, Les Discophiles Français. (Archipel 2-CD set)
- Mozart – Adagio & Fugue in C minor K546. (Les Discophiles Français LP)
- Brahms – Quartet no 1 op 51 no 1: Clarinet Quintet (with Antoine-Pierre de Bavier).
- Brahms – Quartets no 2 in A minor op 51 no 2: no 3 in Bb major op 67, recorded 1954. (Decca Heritage CD 475 6155)
- Bartók – 6 Quartets, recorded 1954–1956
- Beethoven Quartets, complete in Stereo version, 1972-4. (Telefunken)
- Bartók – 6 Quartets, recorded 1972 (Astrée)
- Schubert – Quartet no 15 in G major D 887 (Op. posth. 161). (Orfeo CD)
