= Sándor Végh =

Hungarian violinist and conductor (1912 - 1997)

Sándor Végh (17 May 1912 – 7 January 1997) was a Hungarian, later French, violinist and conductor. He was best known as one of the great chamber music violinists of the twentieth century.

== Education ==
Sándor Végh was born in 1912 in Kolozsvár, Transylvania, Austria-Hungary, (since 1920 Cluj-Napoca, Romania). His parents were not professional musicians but folk music especially was an important part of family life. At the age of six he was given a violin, "Because", he says, "that was cheaper than a piano. My parents had no idea how much money I had to save later to be able to buy a Stradivari." He entered the Liszt Ferenc Academy of Music in 1924, taking violin studies with Jenő Hubay and composition with Zoltán Kodály. He began a career as a solo violinist and in 1927, when he played a Richard Strauss composition under the composer's baton. He graduated from the Liszt Ferenc Academy of Music in 1930, having won the Hubay Prize and the Reményi Prize from the institution in 1927.

== Chamber musician ==
As his solo career was developing, he joined the Hungarian Trio with Ilonka Krauss and László Vencze. In 1934, he became one of the founding members of the Hungarian String Quartet. He was initially the first violinist, but gave that position to Zoltán Székely and took second chair. He participated with the Hungarian String Quartet in the first Hungarian performance of Béla Bartók's String Quartet No. 5.

Végh left the Hungarian String Quartet in 1940 to found his own quartet, the Végh Quartet. At the first international music competition held in Geneva in 1946, the Végh Quartet was awarded the first prize. He and the quartet left Hungary in 1946. The quartet continued to give concerts until the mid-1970s; Végh also made solo appearances as a violinist. From 1958 Végh played on his own Stradivari from 1724, which once belonged to Niccolò Paganini.

== Teaching, conducting ==
In the same year (1940) in which he established the quartet that bore his name, Végh became a professor at the Franz Liszt Academy of Music in Budapest, a position he held until 1946, when he left Hungary.

In 1952 he met cellist Pablo Casals, who invited Végh to join him in giving summer classes in Zermatt, Switzerland (1953–62) and to appear annually at Casals' Prades Festival (1953–69). He began his first recital there with Bach: the solo Sonata in g minor. Works of Bach played a special role in his life, as Végh himself declared on numerous occasions.

He found teaching rewarding and taught at the Basel Conservatory (1953–63), in Freiburg (1954–62), Düsseldorf (1962–69), and at the Mozarteum in Salzburg (1971–97).

He founded the International Chamber Music Festival of Cervo (Liguria, Italy) in 1964, and often conducted there. He also founded an orchestra, the Sándor Végh Chamber Orchestra, which he led from 1968 to 1971, and conducted the Marlboro Festival Orchestra (1974–77). And in 1972, after visiting Cornwall (England) at Hilary Tunstall-Behrens' invitation, he co-founded the International Musicians Seminar Prussia Cove (England). In 1978 he became conductor of the Camerata Academica at the Mozarteum. With them he made a recording of Mozart’s divertimentos and serenades that won the Grand Prix du Disque in 1989.

He was awarded "Chevalier de la Légion d'honneur" in 1986, Doctor Honoris causa of Warwick and Exeter universities (1987), an honorary appointment as Commander of the Order of the British Empire (CBE) in 1988 and the Gold Medal of Salzburg in 1987.

In letters to Charles Barber, Carlos Kleiber referred to Végh as "my conducting idol" and said: "That man is pure music. A monster". "He is great, wild, Asiatic... I didn't get a word in edgeways, thank God."

Végh took French citizenship in 1953, but is perhaps best regarded as a "world citizen of music", having made his home in Basel and, from 1971, in Greifensee, near Zurich. He also lived in Salzburg from the 1970s onwards.

After a short illness in 1997, he died at a hospital in Freilassing, just across the border from Salzburg. His grave is in the cemetery of the old parish church in Liefering, in the district of Salzburg.

== See also ==
- Végh Quartet
