= Alexander Libermann =

American pianist (1896–1978)

Alexander Libermann (1896–1978) was a Bay Area-based pianist and educator who taught piano at Mills College.

He completed his early musical training in Kiev, Russian Empire, before fleeing to Germany, where he studied with Egon Petri and Ferrucio Busoni, and France, where he was forced to live in hiding from Nazis. In 1947, he accepted an invitation from Petri to join the faculty at Mills College. He and his wife Stefa settled permanently in California, and he taught at Mills for 31 years until his death. Libermann has a far-reaching influence, and is linked as an instructor to many professional musicians, including pianists William Corbett Jones and Lois Brandwynne, and pianist-composer Elinor Armer.

In 1984, Armer compiled a series of his lectures into a volume entitled A Comprehensive Approach to the Piano, in which he discusses his method of playing the instrument. Central to this are the theories that the keys should be moved using the hand's natural "grasping" motion, and that music-making should be a largely mental phenomenon and pianists should therefore do much of their practicing in their heads.
