= Oberlin Trio =

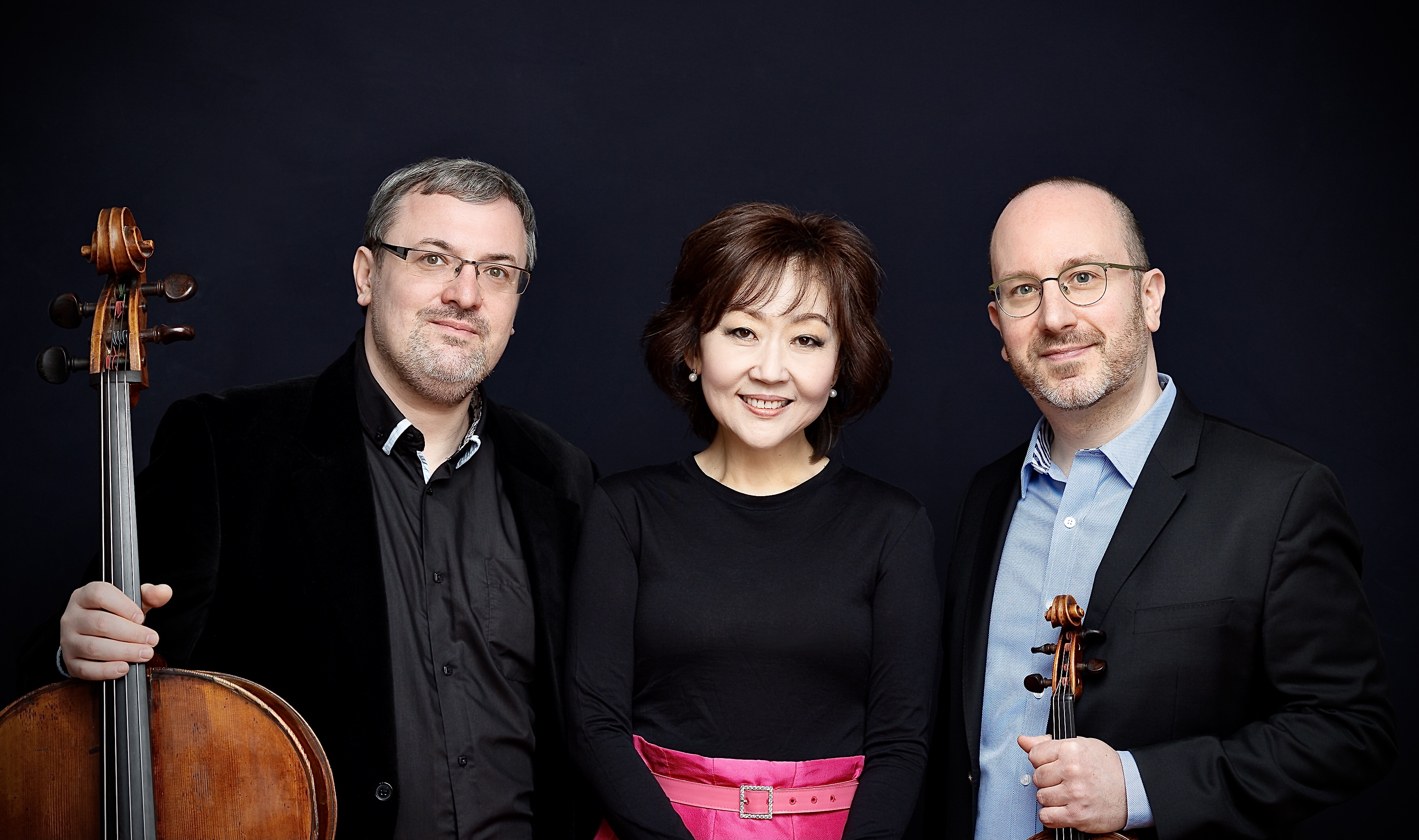
The Oberlin Trio in 2022: cellist Dmitry Kouzov, pianist Haewon Song, and violinist David Bowlin. (Photo by Tanya Rosen-Jones)

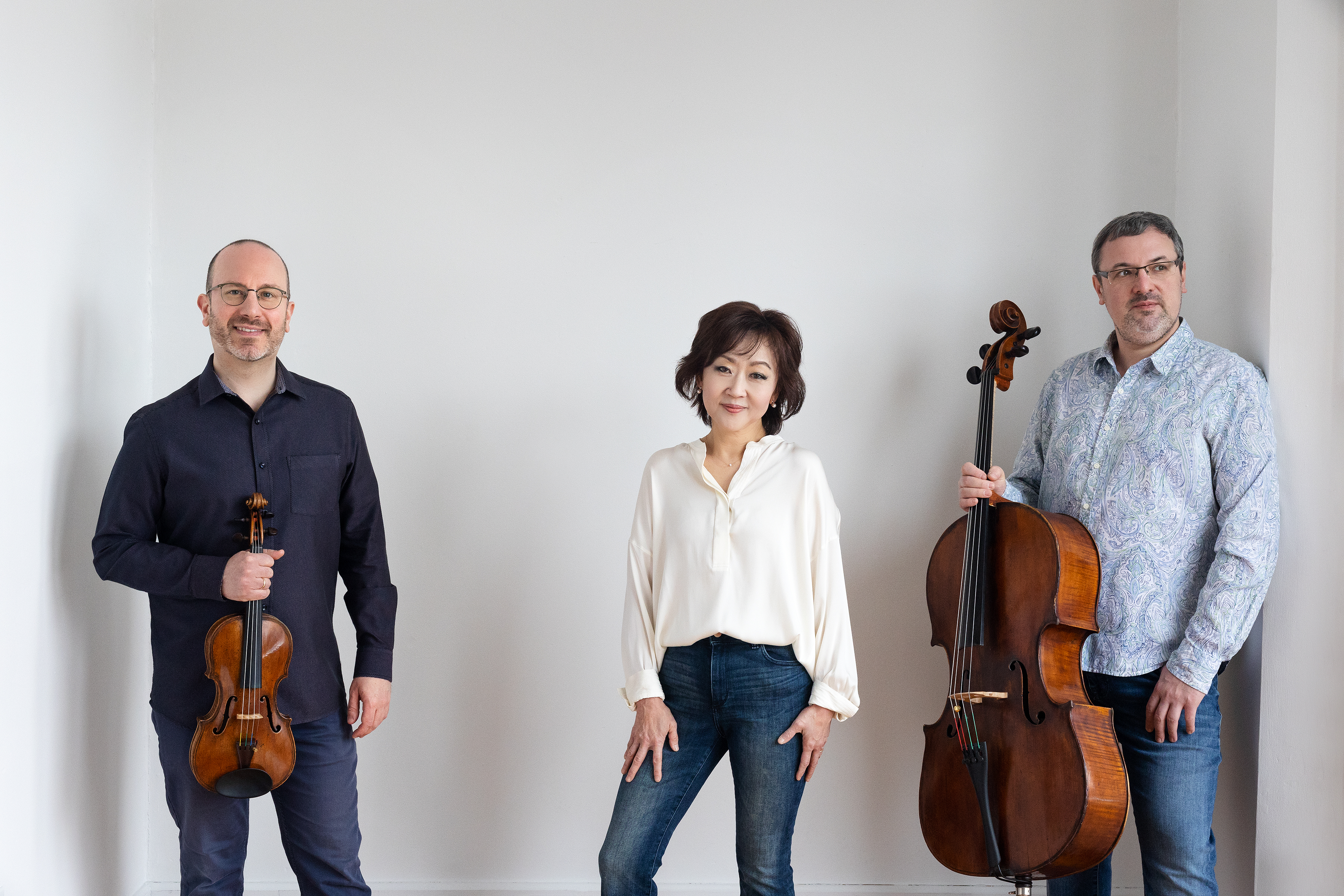
The Oberlin Trio. (Photo by Tanya Rosen-Jones)

The Oberlin Trio was founded in 1982 by three faculty members of the Oberlin Conservatory: Stephen Clapp, violin; Andor Toth Jr., cello; and Joseph Schwartz, piano. In its current configuration with pianist Haewon Song, violinist David Bowlin, and cellist Dmitry Kouzov, the group continues an Oberlin tradition.

== Touring ==
The Oberlin Trio has toured across the United States and in South Korea with traditional repertoire and contemporary works alike, with recent concerts highlighting music by the American composer George Walker and Japanese composer Tōru Takemitsu.

== Former members ==
In addition to the founding members, former members of the Trio include cellists Peter Rejto, Darrett Adkins, and Amir Eldan.

== Discography ==
1. Leon Kirchner Piano Trio, performed by the Oberlin Trio
2. 20th century American Piano Trios
3. French Trios - Maurice Ravel, Jean Baptiste Loeillet of Ghent, Claude Debussy
4. Trios by Dmitri Shostakovich, Antonín Dvořák, and Joan Tower. Oberlin Music, 2016
5. Trios by Franz Joseph Haydn. Naxos (2022)
