= Vermeer Quartet =

The Vermeer Quartet was a string quartet founded in 1969 at the Marlboro Music Festival in Vermont and active until 2007.

== Background ==
They performed in North and South America, Europe, the Far East, and Australia. Based in Chicago, they spent part of each summer on the coast of Maine as the featured ensemble for Bay Chamber Concerts.

Their discography includes the complete string quartets of Beethoven, Tchaikovsky, and Bartók, plus various other works by Haydn, Schubert, Mendelssohn, Brahms, Dvořák, Verdi, Tchaikovsky, Shostakovich, and Schnittke.

In 2003 they received a Grammy nomination for their CD of the Shostakovich and Schnittke piano quintets with Boris Berman on the Naxos label. Their recording of the six Bartók quartets was released by Naxos in May 2005, and received a 3rd Grammy nomination.

The Vermeer was associated with Northern Illinois University as "resident artist faculty" since 1970, where they trained the following ensembles: the Shanghai String Quartet, Enso String Quartet, Avalon String Quartet, Pacifica String Quartet, and Arianna String Quartet. They were also Fellows at the Royal Northern College of Music in Manchester, England.

== The Seven Last Words of Christ ==
The Vermeer Quartet's Grammy-nominated CD of Haydn's The Seven Last Words of Christ [Alden Productions: CD 23042] -produced by its violist, Richard Young- features introductions by Rev. Martin Luther King Jr., evangelist Billy Graham, Father Virgil Elizondo, Dr. Martin Marty, Elder Dallin Oaks, Rev. Kelly Clem, Pastor T. L. Barrett, Father Raymond Brown, and Jason Robards.

== Reviews ==
Switzerland's Suisse wrote, "Out of this alchemy is born a thing of beauty which one can define, without hesitation, as perfection."

About their Beethoven recordings, Stereo Review said, "What these peerless players give us is a heady blend of old-fashioned warmth and communicativeness, with exemplary demonstrations of modern standards of both taste and technique. More persuasive performances of any of these quartets are simply not to be found."

Australia's The Age wrote, "Their performance was magnificent: majestic in style, technically without flaw, and utterly persuasive."

According to Germany's Süddeutsche Zeitung, "This is music-making which reveals much of the inner self: music-making of untamed necessity that goes far beyond that which is merely pleasing to the ear."

The Chicago Tribune wrote: "When presented as poignantly as the Vermeer presents it, the inner core of the piece is left so exposed that both religious and dramatic power radiate from within. The tender loving care that the Vermeer lavishes over every phrase of this unique score is something quite special to behold."

Poland's Ruch Muzyczny summed up, "The Vermeer's interpretation seems so nearly ideal that one can more easily appreciate music as universal harmony."

== Members ==
The Vermeer Quartet's last members were:

- Shmuel Ashkenasi, violin
- Mathias Tacke, violin
- Richard Young, viola
- Marc Johnson, cello

Previous members included Pierre Menard, second violin, (1970–1992), followed by Mathias Tacke, (1992–2007). Scott Nikrenz, viola, 1969, followed by Nobuko Imai (until 1978), Jerry Horner (1978–1980), Bernard Zaslav (1980–1985), and Richard Young (1985–2007). Richard Sher, cello (1969–1972), Ron Leonard, 1972, succeeded by Marc Johnson (1973–2007).
