= John Dalley =

American violinist

- Born: March 3, 1935 (age 91); Madison, Wisconsin, U.S.
- Education: Curtis Institute of Music
- Occupation: Classical violinist

John Dalley (born 3 March 1935) is an American violinist. He was raised in a musical family. His father was an orchestra conductor, violinist, composer, instrumental teacher, and music educator. His mother, from Bloomington, Illinois, was a cellist, music teacher, and music publisher.

== Early history ==
He is the son of Orien Emil Dalley and Gretchen Smoot. Orien Dalley is nationally recognized for his work in assisting Dr. Joseph E. Maddy to organize the National High School Orchestra in Michigan, a massive project that provided the impetus for the Interlochen National Music Camp, now Interlochen Center for the Arts. He was one of the original faculty at Interlochen. John's parents had met during Orien's early association with the National High School Orchestra. The couple had four children, Nielsen, John, Melinda, and Elaine. The entire family has had close ties with Interlochen, with Gretchen as cello instructor and program director, and Orien teaching violin and conducting at Interlochen. Three of Orien and Gretchen's grandchildren grew up as summer camp students there. Orien Dalley was the first conductor of the Wichita Symphony Orchestra, until 1949, when he left for Michigan. He is listed as the fifth symphony conductor with the Ann Arbor Symphony Orchestra between 1952 and 1955.

== Childhood and education ==
At 18, Dalley entered the prestigious Curtis Institute of Music in Philadelphia on a full scholarship. He studied under the concert violinist Efrem Zimbalist, Sr. who had studied at the Saint Petersburg Conservatory in Russia, under the teaching of the violinist Leopold Auer. Dalley gave solo recitals and played concerti, performed chamber music, and played in concert and opera orchestras. In a 1957 listing of Curtis recitals and events, Dalley is noted as first viola player in the production of Giacomo Puccini's opera Gianni Schicchi. After graduation from Curtis, Dalley joined the faculty at the Oberlin Conservatory in Ohio and played second violin in the resident string quartet, while performing regularly in recital and as soloist with orchestra. Eventually he moved to New York City where he free-lanced, then joined the short-lived American String Quartet with the cellist David Soyer."

== John Dalley, American violinist ==
Dalley began playing the violin when he was three years old with his father as his first teacher. His early studies were under Virgil Person at College of Emporia. "During his formative years, his father held a number of positions in different parts of the country, exposing the young violinist to many musical influences."

With his family's stay in Wichita, Kansas, during his father's tenure with the Wichita Symphony, Dalley played in his junior high school orchestra. As a teenager, he participated as a violinist in the annual all-state school musical competitions for youth orchestras, bands, and choral groups under the direction of Dr. Joseph E. Maddy. Winfield had a long history of musical greatness in education due to the time when Maddy was in Winfield directing its high school music program. Later, Howard Halgedahl, a world class bassoon player, directed the high school music program in Winfield. Howard Taubman stated in the New York Times, "Do we, in the East, realize that the town of Winfield, Kansas, population 12,500, has one of the most admirable high school orchestras in nation?". Halgedahl was principal bassoonist with the Wichita Symphony at the time that Dalley's father was conductor. Wichita Municipal University (now Wichita State University) was known for its ambitious educational programs in performing arts and in the education of future music teachers. In the 1950s, the Wichita Symphony was ranked very high among the professional symphonies in the U.S. The musicianship of some local students while still in high school earned them performing places within the ranks of the professional Wichita Symphony Orchestra. Among young musician friends, a union card for work in the symphony proudly proclaimed status as a profession musician.

Dalley held teaching positions at the Curtis Institute of Music in Philadelphia, and was artist-in-residence at the University of Illinois at Urbana-Champaign. At the University of Maryland all four members of the Guarneri Quartet were artists-in-residence. at the University of Maryland School of Music. The Guarneri Quartet has taught, in various combinations at Rutgers State University of New Jersey and the Manhattan School of Music.

== Oberlin String Quartet ==
The Oberlin String Quartet was formed in 1955 by the violinist Andor Toth who was a member of the Oberlin faculty from 1955. The other members were Matthew Raimondi (violin), William Berman (viola) and John Frazer (cello). In 1957, Dalley joined the quartet. In summer 1958, the quartet won a bronze medal in the Concours International de Quatuor sponsored by H.M. Queen Elizabeth Music Competition in Liege, Belgium.

== Guarneri Quartet ==
Dalley was a regular participant at the Marlboro Music Festival in Vermont. In summer 1963, the ensemble was brought together partly at the instigation of Rudolf Serkin, conductor, and Alexander Schneider, violinist of the Budapest String Quartet, who had begun summer teaching at the Marlboro Music School and Marlboro Music Festival. The four men, who had performed with each other before on various occasions, came together to found the Guarneri Quartet, comprising Arnold Steinhardt (first violin), Dalley (second violin), Michael Tree (Michael Applebaum) (viola), and David Soyer (cello). Soyer had also written musical jingles for radio advertising.

Hearing the quartet perform in 1964, the New York Times music critic Harold Schonberg called it the "awesome foursome" and wrote that "a very important string quartet is on its way." This musical group, with its four original members, defied the odds for the longevity of its musical partnership that lasted until Soyer retired in 2001. Soyer chose as his replacement his former cello student Peter Wiley, also a Curtis graduate, who had for many years been the cellist with the Beaux Arts Trio. When the Guarneri Quartet was disbanded in 2009, it had been on a continuous concert circuit for forty-five years. According to its members, the longevity of Guarneri was due to several factors. One was playing music that they loved as well as playing compositions that presented musical and performance challenges. These kept boredom away and performances fresh. Although the four performed together in concert, and they practiced together for three hours a day, "on tour the members travelled independently, and booked hotel rooms on separate floors." Little of their private lives away from the stresses of concert and touring life was shared with the other members of the quartet. "The members famously kept their distance from one another when they weren't rehearsing or performing." Two other rules were 1) No wives were allowed to be involved with the quartet business, and 2) The inner dynamics of the rehearsing and concert venues made it a compliment-free zone between the four. If there was nothing to complain about, the group moved on to the next order of business.

== Dalley's violin and performances ==
Dalley plays a Nicolas Lupot violin, made in France in 1810. Some years ago the quartet members were approached by the Corcoran Gallery in Washington, D.C., which made a very generous offer of possible extended use by the quartet of its rare Stradivarius instruments. Antonio Stradivarius of Cremona produced a life-time of fine instruments. At the time of the offer, there were only 500 violins, fifty cellos, and ten violas still extant. Although much less rare than the Stradivarii, the specific venerable instruments owned and played by the quartet's members, with their craftsmanship, type of wood, varnish, and all of substantial age, together "created such a warmth and complexity of sound that enticed, then seduced each of us." The offer to use the Stradivarii was politely declined. At this writing Dalley has been playing the violin for 75 years. He refers to his violin as his friend.

European chamber ensembles usually had a leader, to whom all the others looked to for direction. In these, the second violinist was often considered to be not quite as good as the first violinist. The Guarneri quartet took a different tack. The first violinist was not the leader. All of the members were the leaders, depending on the circumstance. All had equal say in decisions. Arnold Steinhardt said at the end of the quartet's forty-five year run, "This is an extraordinarily difficult task before us, to realize the masterpieces in our repertoire to any satisfaction. Some of it is virtuoso work, and some is work that a watchmaker might do, requiring the most delicate precision movement of ensemble and intonation and artistry. It doesn't get any easier with time." Dalley found himself comfortable in the second chair. "I've always liked where I've been," he asserted. "I was not really happy playing solos. It wasn't my bag." From time to time Dailey has traded off with Steinhardt to play first violin in piano quartets with the likes of Artur Rubenstein. Later the group spent almost two seasons playing nothing but piano quartets with Dalley in the violin seat while Steinhardt recovered from surgery on his arm. Dalley could also switch to playing viola should the occasion call require.

Dalley performed extensively in thousands of performances with the Guarneri — over 3,000 by 1998. Since the quartet was disbanded in 2009, he has appeared in recital or as soloist in many cities and as a teacher in master classes. These performances have taken him to Canada, Mexico, South America, Europe, Israel, Australia, New Zealand, Japan and other parts of Asia, and widely throughout the United States. He has performed in famous concert halls throughout the world, in venerable old music schools, high school and college auditoriums, and many other places, such as the informal beach house at Half Moon Bay in Northern California where, in November 1964, he was a featured performer at one of the San Francisco Bay Area's much loved, but quirky Bach Dancing and Dynamite Society.

== John Dalley, bow maker ==
When he could not find a violin bow worthy of his instrument, to bring out the best qualities of his Nicolas Lupot violin, Dalley expanded his skills by becoming an archetier — one who makes bows for stringed instruments. Dalley is known for the quality and meticulously fine craftsmanship of his hand-made bows for stringed instruments. In a sales catalogue, one of his violin bows is described as having an "exquisitely crafted Brazilian pernambuco shaft, elegant silk wrapping and a diamond-shaped inlaid frog". Fellow quartet member, Steinhardt, stated that John Dalley was the only person he knew who was both a great violinist and a great bow maker, and said that Dalley made "bows of both great craft and remarkable playing ability." Amadee Williams, the violist and author of Lillian Fuch, First Lady of the Viola, also described Dalley as "one of the best modern bow makers", crafting bows that "produce an unusually warm sound". Dalley cites the master bow maker William Salchow and the late assistant principal cellist of the Metropolitan Opera and master bow maker Gerald Kagan as influences on his own bow making. Dalley's craft and skill produce violin bows that are in high demand because of their quality and rarity.

Dalley married Nancy Pallesen, a flautist who he met when she was studying with William Kincaid (principal flautist, Philadelphia Orchestra at the Curtis Institute of Music in 1958). When he is not concertizing, John divides his time between Haworth, New Jersey and Northern Michigan.

== Recordings ==
The Guarneri String Quartet has made numerous recordings during its long history, including some of the most important works in the string quartet and chamber music literature. They recorded for Arabesque, RCA Red Seal, Philips, Sony and Surroundedby. The Guarneri String Quartet has recorded for Surroundedby Entertainment, which released a CD in spring 2001 of Quartets by Ravel, Debussy and Fauré. Several of its recordings on both RCA Red Seal and Philips have won international awards, including its recent recording of Juan Crisostomo de Arriaga's String Quartet Nos. 1-3 (Philips), which won the 1996 Deutsche Schallplattenkritik Award in Germany. Among its other award-winning recordings are collaborations with such artists as Artur Rubinstein, Pinchas Zukerman and Boris Kroyt and Mischa Schneider of the Budapest Quartet.

- Juan Crisóstomo Arriaga – Complete String Quartets
- Béla Bartók – Complete String Quartets
- Ludwig van Beethoven – Complete String Quartets (recorded twice: on RCA and Philips), String Quintet in C Op. 29 (with Pinchas Zukerman)
- Alexander Borodin – String Quartet No. 2
- Johannes Brahms – Complete String Quartets, Complete String Quintets (with Pinchas Zukerman), Piano Quintet in F Op. 34 (with Artur Rubinstein on RCA, with Peter Serkin on Philips), Complete Piano Quartets (with Artur Rubinstein),
- Claude Debussy – String Quartet (recorded twice: on RCA and on Surroundedby Entertainment)
- Ernő Dohnányi – String Quartet No. 2 in D flat on Sony
- Antonín Dvořák – Piano Quintet No. 2 Op. 81 (with Artur Rubinstein), Quartet in C Op. 61, Quartet No. 12 in F Op. 96 ("American"), Quartet in G Op. 106, in A flat Op. 105, Viola Quintet in E flat Op. 97 (with Walter Trampler), Terzetto Op. 74
- Gabriel Fauré – String Quartet Op. 121 (recorded twice: on RCA and Surroundedby Entertainment), Piano Quartet in C Op. 15 (with Artur Rubinstein)
- Edvard Grieg – String Quartet in G Op. 27 (recorded twice: on RCA and Philips)
- Joseph Haydn – String Quartets in D Op. 20 No. 4, in G Op. 74 No. 3, in G Op. 77 No. 1, in F Op. 77 No. 2
- Hans Werner Henze – Piano Quintet (with Peter Serkin)
- Leoš Janáček – Complete String Quartets
- Felix Mendelssohn – String Quartet in A minor Op. 13, String Quartet in D Op. 44 No. 1, Viola Quintet in B flat Op. 87 (with Pinchas Zukerman), Octet in E flat Op. 20 (with the Orion String Quartet)
- Wolfgang Amadeus Mozart – The Complete Piano Quartets (with Artur Rubinstein), Eine kleine Nachtmusik (with Julius Levine), 6 String Quartets dedicated to Joseph Haydn (recorded twice: for RCA and Philips) (in G K387, in D K421, in E K428, in B flat K458, in A K464, in C K465), String Quartet in D K499, String Quartet in D K575, String Quartet in B flat K589, String Quartet in F K590, The Complete Viola Quintets (with Ida Kavafian, Steven Tenenbom, and Kim Kashkashian)
- Maurice Ravel – String Quartet (recorded twice: for RCA and Surroundedby Entertainment)
- Franz Schubert – String Quartets in A D804 (recorded twice: for RCA and Arabesque), in C "Quartettsatz", in D D810 "Death and the Maiden" (recorded twice: for RCA and Arabesque), in G D887, String Quintet in C D956 (with Bernie Greenhouse), "Trout" Quintet D667 (with Emanuel Ax and Julius Levine)
- Robert Schumann – Complete String Quartets, Op. 41, Piano Quintet in E flat Op. 44 (with Artur Rubinstein)
- Jean Sibelius – String Quartet in D minor Op. 56 Voces intimae
- Bedřich Smetana – String Quartet in E minor ("From my Life")
- Pyotr Ilyich Tchaikovsky – String Quartet No. 1 in D Op. 11, "Souvenir de Florence" Sextet Op. 70 (with Boris Kroyt and Mischa Schneider)
- Giuseppe Verdi – String Quartet in E minor
- Hugo Wolf – Italian Serenade

Dalley has made recordings with other notable artists, such as Leonard Rose, Artur Rubenstein, Pinchas Zukerman and members of the Budapest Quartet. The quartet was awarded the 2009 Grammy Award for Chamber Music.

== Films ==
- 1989: High Fidelity – The Guarneri String Quartet, directed by Allan Miller, who was also the director/producer of the Academy Award-winning documentary, From Mozart to Mao, which dealt with the violinist Isaac Stern's visit to China and produced by Desmond Ryan. Inquirer Movie Critic on June 20, 1990, reviewed the film documentary about the Guarneri Quartet. "A Probing into Advice and Consent": "The string quartet is an enduring metaphor of harmony, teamwork and the subordination of ego in the interest of a common goal. Its 20th century repertoire may offer pieces filled with abrasive dissonance, but can there be no room for dissent? . . . A resounding yes. . . . Miller, whose special flair for communicating the intimacies and reach of great music made from Mao to Mozart: Isaac Stern in China so memorable, here ups the ante and takes up the issue of fiddlers four."

== Television ==
In summer 1990, the Guarneri Quartet members were interviewed by Charles Kuralt on CBS's nationwide television program, Sunday Morning.

== Videos ==
- Brahms Klavierquartett in G minor 1 op 25 with Mikhail Rudy (piano), John Dalley (violin), Michael Tree (viola) and David Soyer (cello) (string members of the Guarneri Quartet)
- Beethoven Op. 130 Mvt. V. Cavatina, with Guarneri Quartet, Arnold Steinhardt (first violin), John Dalley (second violin), Michael tree (viola) and David Soyer (cello) recording released in 2003, remastered from recording made in the 1960s.

== Guarneri Quartet awards ==
- 2010: The Alumni Award, Curtis Institute of Music
- 2010: Grammy Award, Best Chamber Music for the Hungarian Album
- 2005: The Ford Honors Award, University of Michigan University Musical Society
- 2004: The Richard J. Bogomolny National Service Award, Chamber Music America.
- 1992: The Award of Merit, Association of Performing Arts Presenters in New York City.
- 1983: Honorary Doctorate degrees by the State University of New York.
- 1982: The New York City Seal of Recognition, presented by Mayor Ed Koch.
- 1976: Honorary Doctorate degrees by the University of South Florida

== Related publications ==
- David Blum (1986). The Art of Quartet Playing: The Guarneri Quartet in Conversation with David Blum, New York: Alfred A. Knopf Inc. ISBN 0-394-53985-0.
- Gretchen Dalley, Songs for Strings, Solo, Duet, Trio, Neil A. Kjos Music Publisher, USA, 1950.
- I. Fink & C. Merriell with the Guarneri String Quartet (1985). String Quartet Playing, New Jersey: Paganiniana Publications, Inc. ISBN 0-86622-007-0
- Helen Drees Ruttencutter (1980). Quartet: a Profile of the Guarneri Quartet, New York: Lippincott & Crowell Publishers. ISBN 0-690-01944-0
- Arnold Steinhardt (1998). Indivisible by Four: A String Quartet in Pursuit of Harmony, New York: Farrar, Straus and Giroux ISBN 0-374-23670-4.
