= New Hungarian Quartet =

Classical music string quarter

The New Hungarian Quartet was a string quartet founded by Andor Toth in 1972 at Oberlin Conservatory of Music, where members were on the faculty. It is separate from the well-known Hungarian Quartet, though the violist in both groups was the same. From 1975 until 1979 the quartet was the first faculty quartet-in-residence at the Taos School of Music in Taos, New Mexico.

== Personnel ==
Violinist Andor Toth founded the New Hungarian Quartet in 1972. It was based at the Oberlin Conservatory of Music in Oberlin, Ohio, where they were faculty members. The other members of the Quartet were Richard Young, second violin; Denes Koromzay (1913–2001), viola, formerly violist in the Hungarian Quartet; and Andor Toth, Jr., cello, formerly principal cellist of the San Francisco Symphony under conductor Josef Krips.

== Touring ==
The New Hungarian Quartet toured internationally, giving many concerts during its career. The quartet performed a concert in New York City in Alice Tully Hall in February, 1976. Oberlin College president Emil Danenberg, an established concert pianist, joined them for the Brahms Piano Quintet in F. Music critic Raymond Ericson commented in The New York Times that:

The Brahms] was greeted enthusiastically, however, by a near-capacity audience, as were the works offered by the New Hungarian Quartet alone. These included Mozart's "Hunt" Quartet and Bartók's Fourth Quartet. The playing here was classic in its restraint and sweetness. The soft playing in the trio of the Mozart Adagio was ravishing. The stylishness held good throughout the Bartók, even when the players did justice to the wild dance rhythms of the last movement. This was top-level playing.

== Recordings ==
The quartet made several recordings for VOX in their VOXBOX series (see discography below). The most notable recording was the CD album of the Six String Quartets by Béla Bartók, recorded in 1976 for VOX (Vox SVBX 593).

=== Selected discography ===
Arkiv Music VoxBox CDX 5022: Schubert, String Quartets / New Hungarian Quartet
Andor Toth (violin), Richard Young (violin), Denes Koromzay (viola), Andor Toth, Jr. (cello)

1. String Quartet No. 13 in A minor, D 804/Op. 29 no 1 Rosamunde
2. String Quartet No. 14 in D minor, D 810 Death and the Maiden
3. String Quartet No. 15 in G major, D 887/Op. 161
4. Quartettsatz in C minor, D 703/Op. posthumous

VoxBox (Classical) CD3X 3012: Beethoven, The Middle Quartets / New Hungarian Quartet
Andor Toth (violin), Richard Young (violin), Denes Koromzay (viola), Andor Toth, Jr. (cello)

1. String Quartet No. 7 in F major ("Rasumovsky 1"), Op. 59/1
2. String Quartet No. 8 in E minor ("Rasumovsky 2"), Op. 59/2
3. String Quartet No. 9 in C major ("Rasumovsky 3"), Op. 59/3
4. String Quartet No. 10 in E flat major ("Harp"), Op. 74
5. String Quartet No. 11 in F minor ("Serioso"), Op. 95

VoxBox (Classical) CDX 3031: Debussy and Ravel Quartets / New Hungarian Quartet, second CD of 3-CD set. Andor Toth (violin), Richard Young (violin), Denes Koromzay (viola), Andor Toth, Jr. (cello)

1. String Quartet (Debussy) in G Minor, Op. 10
2. String Quartet (Ravel)

Vox SVBX 593 Béla Bartók: The 6 string quartets. New Hungarian Quartet: Andor Toth (violin), Richard Young (violin), Denes Koromzay (viola), Andor Toth, Jr. (cello). Cataloged in the Library of Congress, Control No. 77760307.
