= Stephen Clapp =

American violinist (1939–2014)

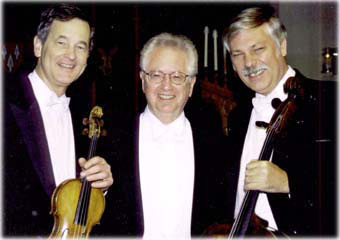
The Oberlin Trio (original): Stephen Clapp, violin; Joseph Schwartz, piano; Andor Toth Jr., cello

Stephen Clapp (November 27, 1939 – January 26, 2014) was a violinist and Dean Emeritus of the Juilliard School.

== Education ==
Clapp earned the B.M degree from the Oberlin Conservatory and the M.S. degree from the Juilliard School. He was a student of Dorothy DeLay, Ivan Galamian, and Andor Toth. He studied chamber music with Claus Adam, Robert Mann, Felix Galimir, Raphael Hillyer, Louis Persinger, and Walter Trampler.

== Performance ==
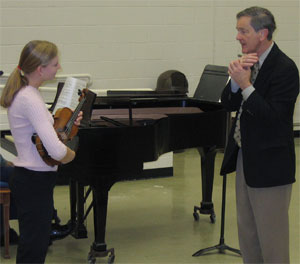
Stephen Clapp, violin, with student at East Carolina University, Dec. 2, 2005

As a member of the Beaux-Arts String Quartet, Clapp won the first Naumburg Chamber Music Award. He won the Josef Gingold Prize of the Cleveland Society for Strings while a student at the Oberlin Conservatory. Clapp was concertmaster of the Aspen Chamber Symphony, Nashville Symphony, and the Austin Symphony Orchestra.

Clapp performed in numerous summer festivals in Europe and North America. He was a founding faculty member of Credo Chamber Music, at Oberlin Conservatory. He was first violinist in the Blair String Quartet from 1967 to 1972.

In 1982, Clapp was the founding violinist of the Oberlin Trio, along with cellist Andor Toth Jr. and pianist Joseph Schwartz.

On April 28, 1985, Tim Page (music critic) of the New York Times had this to say about Clapp's playing in a New York debut recital: "Mr. Clapp, who was ably accompanied by the pianist Frances Walker, plays sweetly and songfully, with innate taste; he produces a dark, affecting tone from his instrument, which sounded almost like a viola at times. . . . a vigorous interpretation, which it received Sunday."

== Teaching ==
Clapp taught violin at a number of schools:

- Peabody College, 1967–1972
- Aspen Music Festival and School, 1971–1994
- University of Texas at Austin, 1972–1979
- Oberlin Conservatory, 1978–1990
- The Juilliard School, 1987–2014
- Credo Music, 1999–2013

== Selected discography ==
- Leon Kirchner Piano Trio, performed by the Oberlin Trio
- 20th-century American Piano Trios
- French Trios - Maurice Ravel, Jean Baptiste Loeillet of Ghent, Claude Debussy
