= Oberlin String Quartet =

The Oberlin String Quartet is a classical music ensemble associated with the Oberlin Conservatory of Music at Oberlin College, Oberlin, Ohio.

In 1955, violinist and Oberlin Conservatory faculty member Andor Toth formed the Oberlin String Quartet with violinist Matthew Raimondi, violist William Berman, and cellist John Frazer. In 1957, violinist John Dalley (second violinist in the Guarneri Quartet), and cellist Peter Howard (for many years principal cellist in the Saint Paul Chamber Orchestra) joined the Quartet.

The quartet disbanded after Andor Toth left the faculty in 1959.

== Award ==
In late summer 1958, the Oberlin String Quartet toured Germany and Belgium, and won fourth prize in the Concours International de Quatuor. The competition was sponsored by the Queen Elisabeth Competition, and held in Liège, Belgium. No first prize was awarded.
