= Alma Trio =

American classical piano trio

The Alma Trio was a classical piano trio established in 1942 at the Alma Estate of Yehudi Menuhin in Los Gatos, California.

== Original members ==
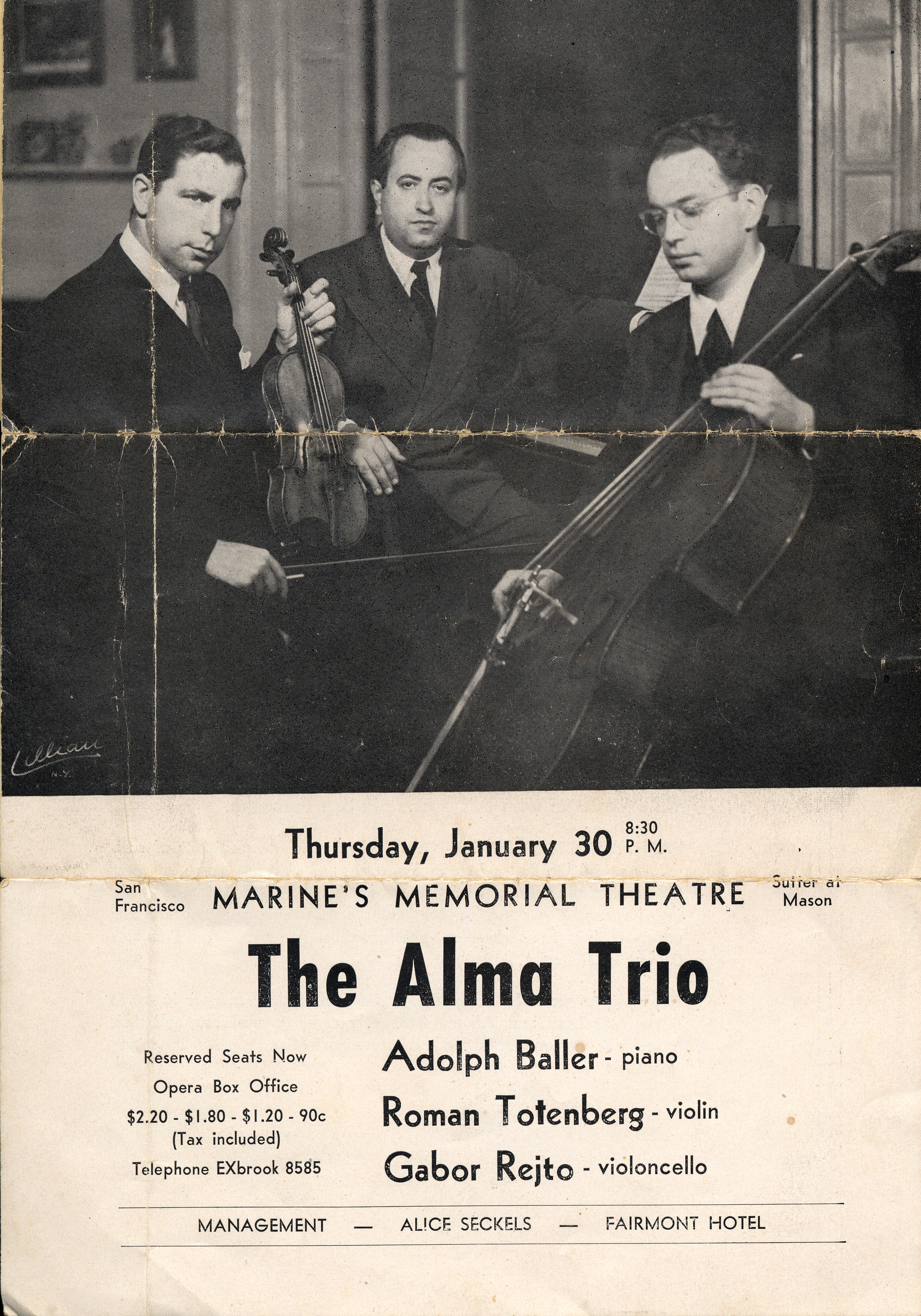
Playbill, San Francisco, 1947

The original founding members of the Alma Trio were Roman Totenberg, violin; Gabor Rejto, cello; and Adolph Baller, piano. The members of the Trio had been encouraged by the famed artist, Yehudi Menuhin, to establish themselves as a professional piano trio. Adolph Baller had emigrated to the United States in 1938 with the sponsorship of Menuhin, following harrowing experiences at the hands of the Nazis in Austria and Germany. After arriving in the United States, Baller was a guest of Menuhin and became his regular collaborating pianist, as he had been earlier in Europe.

== New violinists ==
In 1953 Totenberg left the trio and was replaced by Maurice Wilk, who remained their violinist for ten years until his sudden death in Fall 1963. A review in The New York Times, December 1, 1954, had this to say:

Having acquired a new violinist in Maurice Wilk, the Alma Trio has taken a new lease on life. It deserves to be long and prosperous — that is, if the ensemble continues to play as beautifully as it played last night when it opened the cycle of three Beethoven concerts that it is giving at Town Hall ... few chamber ensembles play the Bonn master with such refinement of spirit and such subtlety of tonal shading.

Violinist Andor Toth joined the trio in the Spring of 1963. During the Fall of 1963, the Alma Trio made their first Russian tour. At the airport, Rejto was informed of a new rule that he would need a second ticket for his cello, and there were no remaining seats available. Faced with the impending cancellation of the tour, Rejto responded quickly, "But it is a bass balalaika." He was able to fly since that instrument was not listed by the airline.

== New pianist ==
This membership of the Alma Trio (Toth, Rejto, Baller) continued until Baller's retirement in 1971, when pianist William Corbett-Jones joined the trio until it disbanded in 1976. From 1982 to 1986 the trio resumed performing with Andor Toth, Gabor Rejto and Adolph Baller for a few concerts mainly in the northern California bay area. The original cellist "Gabby" Rejto died in 1987, and the original pianist "Usiu" Baller died in 1994. Andor Toth lived until 2006 when he died of a stroke in Los Angeles, California, at age 81.
