= Elinor Armer =

American pianist, music educator, and composer (b. 1939)

- Born: October 6, 1939 (age 86); Oakland, California, U.S.
- Education: Mills College at Northeastern University (BA); University of California, Berkeley; California State University, San Francisco (MA)
- Occupations: Pianist; music educator; composer

Elinor Armer (born October 6, 1939) is an American pianist, music educator and composer.

== Biography ==
Elinor Armer was born in Oakland, California but at the age of 2 months moved to Davis, California with her family where she would spend most of her childhood. Armer’s father worked as an engineer and worked for the Agricultural Engineering Department for the University in Davis, which prompted the family’s move. Her father was an acoustical engineer and used to set up speakers in the family’s living room, exposing Elinor to acoustics at a young age. Elinor first began sight-reading music and enjoying four-part harmony because of many hymnals found in the Armer home, due to her father’s Methodist Evangelist background.

Armer comes from a family of California artists, her grandfather was a commercial artist and her grandmother was an author. Her mother was a writer as well and who sang and played the piano. Elinor shared her love of piano with her mother; they frequently sang and played together throughout her childhood. Armer was eight years old when she began playing the piano

Though her mother played the piano also, Elinor was taught to play by a neighbor, Fritz Berens, who happened to be a piano teacher. Her early lessons focused on ear training and dictation. These early music lessons fostered her love and influenced her becoming a composer later in life.

Armer says that some of the major influences in her life include participating in a rhythm band when she was in kindergarten, the radio, and the records her siblings and parents would play around the house.

She studied music under Darius Milhaud and Leon Kirchner for composition and Alexander Libermann for piano. She attended Mills College, where she received a Bachelor of Arts in 1961, the University of California, Berkeley from 1966 to 1968, and California State University, San Francisco, where she received a Master of Arts degree in 1972. She taught composition at the San Francisco Conservatory of Music from 1975 to 2025 (she is now professor of composition, emerits), and has performed and lectured throughout the United States. She helped co-found the organization Composers, Inc. Her papers are housed at UC Berkeley Music Library.

== Education ==
In 1957, Elinor graduated from Davis High School. While she did not know it then, Elinor would eventually go on to be inducted into the Davis Senior High School Hall of Fame. She went on to attend Mills College for her secondary education. While there, she tried out several different majors before deciding on majoring in music composition. Her Piano teacher, Alexander Libermann, had a great deal of influence on her pursuing the piano. Libermann was a very popular professor during his time, and gave a series of lectures on the piano - how to practice, play, and teach. Elinor graduated from Mills college in 1961. From there she continued on to study her masters at UC Berkeley, although she went on to complete her graduate degree in composition from California State, San Francisco.

== Career ==
Elinor Armer has traveled throughout the U.S. as well as abroad to perform. Her music styles range from orchestral to solo. The majority of Elinor's composition including Promptu and Etude Quasi Cadenza has been written for pianist Lois Brandwynne. Elinor Armer enjoys a world-renowned reputation for her work in music education. Elinor was aligned with the San Francisco Conservatory of Music, in which she founded the Composition Department in 1985, and she continued teaching students until her retirement in 2025. Along with the Conservatory of Music, Elinor teaches piano, composition, music history, and theory to students out of her home studio located in Berkeley, CA.

== Awards and honors ==
- The Norman Fromm Composer's Award
- Fellowships from the MacDowell Colony, the Charles Ives Center for American Music, the Chamber Music Conference/Composer's Forum of the East, Yaddo, and the Djerassi Foundation
- The Gerbode Foundation New Music Composition Award (1991)

== Works ==
Armer has produced a collaborative multi-part fantasy series with author Ursula K. Le Guin called Uses of Music in Uttermost Parts which has been recorded on the Koch International Label.

While attending Mills College, Elinor would record and transcribe her lectures with her professor, Alexander Libermann. Upon his death, Elinor and a team of others consolidated these lectures and published a book known as “A Comprehensive Approach to the Piano”.

== Discography ==
- Music of Darius Milhaud (2004) – Audio CD by Parallele Ensemble;Elinor Armer, Darius Milhaud, Nicole Paiement, Parallele Ensemble, et al., Kleos Classics
- Armer: Uses of Music in Uttermost Parts/Falletta (2 CDs) (1995) – Audio CD by Elinor Armer, JoAnn Falletta, Women's Philharmonic, San Francisco Girl's Chorus, et al., Koch Int'l Classics
- Sonata for Cello and Piano, Opus 11, Works for Cello and Piano (2000) – Audio CD by Paul Hindemith, Elinor Armer, Seymour Shifrin, Paul Turok, et al., Music & Arts Program
