= Corrie Hermann =

Dutch politician (born 1932)

Cornelia (Corrie) Hermann (born 4 August 1932) is a Dutch GreenLeft politician.

== Early life and education ==
Cornelia (Corrie) Hermann was born in Amersfoort, 4 August 1932. Between 1950 and 1959, she studied medicine at the University of Utrecht. In 1959, she took her doctor's exam.

== Career ==
She started to work as a neonatal and pediatric doctor and as a health care teacher. Between 1973 and 1978, she worked as a researcher for the Central Institute for the Development of Tests. In 1978, she returned to medical work as chief researcher in social medicine at the Radboud University Nijmegen. In 1982, Hermann became director of the Municipal Health Service in Heemskerk. In 1984, she gained a doctorate in medicine on the basis of a dissertation on women doctors in the Netherlands. In 1985, she joined the board of the Dutch Society for Medicine in addition to her work as director. In 1991, she became a member of the Social Insurance Bank. Afterwards she became a member of the Association for Dutch Women Doctors.

In the 1998 election, Hermann became a member of the House of Representatives for GreenLeft. She was spokesperson on health, welfare and food safety. In 2001, she proposed an amendment on the Tobacco Act, which should ensure a smoke-free working place for all. This amendment led to the ban on smoking on workplace premises and public transport. She did not stand for re-election in 2002 election.

In 1992, she took early retirement, but still has several functions. She chairs the Foundation for General Social Work in IJmond-Beverwijk. She is a member of the Central Medical Review Board, a member of the board of the Foundation for the Care of the Elderly in Velsen, and a member of the Remonstrant Brotherhood.

== Personal life ==
Hermann is divorced from her partner with whom she has four children, and now cohabits with her cats.

In 1996, she founded the Paul Hermann fund, named after her father Paul Hermann, which supports young cellists. Her father was a cellist and composer of Hungarian origin. He was deported in 1944 from Drancy, France, to the Baltic States on the infamous 73rd convoy, after which no trace of him remains.

== Awards and honours ==
- She became officer in the Order of Orange-Nassau.
