= Stanford String Quartet =

The Stanford String Quartet was formed in 1984 as a special project of the Stanford University Department of Music.

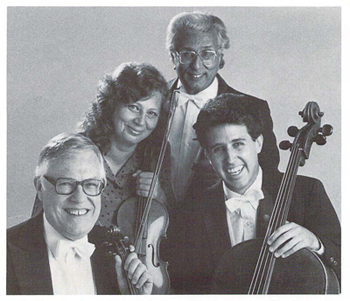
The original Stanford String Quartet in 1984: Andor Toth, violin; Zoya Leybin, violin; Bernard Zaslav, viola; Stephen Harrison, cello

== Personnel ==
Faculty member and violinist Andor Toth became the first violinist. He was joined by Stanford faculty members Bernard Zaslov, viola and Stephen Harrison, cello. Alternating as second violinists were Zoya Lebin and Susan Frier.

== 1987–1989 season ==
The Quartet's 1987–88 season included the world premiere of Bathsheba and Her Suitors, a composition by Jose Bowen commissioned by jazz flutist Hubert Laws and the Stanford String Quartet.

== 1989–90 season ==
The 1989–90 season was built around two compositions commissioned by the Quartet, String Quartet no. 9 by Ben Johnston, and the Tenth String Quartet by Stanford alumni William Bolcom, a faculty member at the University of Michigan. The Quartet also programmed these works on a national tour commemorating the 100th anniversary of the founding of Stanford University. The tour included performances at the John F. Kennedy Center in Washington, D.C., and at Alice Tully Hall, New York City. The Quartet's New York City concert at Alice Tully Hall was reviewed on February 4, 1989 by John Rockwell, music critic for the New York Times. Rockwell said this of the Quartet: ". . . their playing epitomizes central European musicianship at its best: sensible, comfortable, unassuming . . ."

== Signature recording ==
The Johnston and Bolcom quartets were recorded in 1991 by Laurel Records in Los Angeles, California, at Paramount Hall and Skywalker Hall. Also on this initial signature CD is the String Quartet by Marc Neikrug, Stars the Mirror. This CD gave all three compositions their world premiere recording.

== New personnel ==
After the retirement of Andor Toth in 1989, the members of the Quartet were Phillip Levy and Susan Freier, violins; Bernard Zaslov, viola; and Stephen Harrison, cello. This quartet recorded a CD in 1993 that was released in 1994 on the Music & Arts label. The CD included compositions by Darius Milhaud, Frank Bridge, and Gabriel Fauré.
