= Xenia Boodberg Lee =

American concert pianist (1927–2004)

- Xenia Boodberg Lee, from a 1953 newspaper
- Born: Xenia Boodberg; November 28, 1927; Oakland, California, U.S.
- Died: September 27, 2004 (aged 76)
- Other name: Xenia Lee
- Occupation: Pianist
- Children: 2

Xenia Boodberg Lee (November 28, 1927 – September 27, 2004) was an American concert pianist, based in the San Francisco Bay Area.

== Early life ==
Xenia Boodberg was born in Oakland, California, the only child of Peter A. Boodberg (1903-1972) and Elena (Helen) Boodberg (1896-1980). Her father was a Russian-born Baltic German linguistics scholar and professor of Oriental Languages at the University of California, Berkeley. Her aunt Valentina A. Vernon recalled that her parents tried to raise her without speaking English as a small child, "only French and Russian".

Xenia Boodberg was a creative child, publishing poems and stories in the Berkeley newspaper at age 8, and winning an essay contest on fire prevention from the Berkeley Lodge of Elks, also in 1936. She was performing at public events as a pianist before and into her early teens. She earned an associate in arts degree at the University of California, Berkeley in 1948. She also studied with pianist Egon Petri at Mills College, and with pianist Adolph Baller.

== Career ==
Soon after college, in January 1949, she gave a program of piano music by composers Darius Milhaud, Roger Sessions, Joaquín Nin-Culmell, Béla Bartók, and Claude Debussy in New York, of which The New York Times reviewer commented, "Miss Boodberg remains a pianist of unusual potentialities, especially in the field of new music". She played recitals and concerts, especially twentieth-century works, in the San Francisco Bay area and elsewhere, often and for many years afterwards, into the 1970s. She was a member of the San Francisco Musical Club and played with the Oakland Symphony and the Stockton Symphony.

== Personal life ==
Before February 1950, Xenia Boodberg married Richard Henry Lee, a marine sergeant and Korean War veteran, and a descendant of American founding father Richard Henry Lee. They had two children. She died in 2004, aged 76 years.
