= Andor Toth Jr. =

American cellist (1948–2002)

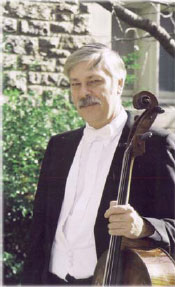
Andor Toth, Jr.

Andor Toth, Jr. (1948–2002) was an American cellist in the Central European, Berlin, and Hungarian traditions.

Toth Jr. was the son of the violinist Andor Toth, with whom he collaborated in the Toth Duo and the New Hungarian Quartet. His teachers were Gábor Rejtő and George Neikrug. He studied cello with Neikrug at the University of Texas before leaving for an appointment as solo cellist with the San Francisco Symphony under conductor Josef Krips.

When he died of esophageal cancer on September 24, 2002, he was Professor of Cello at the Oberlin Conservatory in Ohio, where he had taught for 30 years.

== Career ==
In 1972, when Toth Jr. joined the Oberlin faculty, his father, who was also on the faculty, formed the New Hungarian Quartet.

Andor Toth and Andor Toth, Jr., September 1999

In 1982, Toth formed the Oberlin Trio with Professor of Pianoforte Joseph Schwartz and violin faculty member Stephen Clapp.

=== Selected discography ===
Arkiv Music: Duos For Violin And Cello / Toth Duo

1. Duo for Violin and Cello, Op. 7 by Zoltán Kodály
2. Duo for Violin and Cello no 1, H 157 by Bohuslav Martinů
3. Sonata for Violin and Cello by Maurice Ravel

Arkiv Music VoxBox CDX 5022: Schubert, String Quartets / New Hungarian Quartet
Andor Toth (violin), Richard Young (violin), Denes Koromzay (viola), Andor Toth Jr. (cello)

1. String Quartet No. 13 in A minor, D 804/Op. 29 no 1 "Rosamunde"
2. String Quartet No. 14 in D minor, D 810 "Death and the Maiden"
3. String Quartet No. 15 in G major, D 887/Op. 161
4. Quartettsatz in C minor, D 703/Op. posthumous

VoxBox (Classical) CD3X 3012: Beethoven, The Middle Quartets / New Hungarian Quartet
Andor Toth (violin), Richard Young (violin), Denes Koromzay (viola), Andor Toth Jr. (cello)

1. String Quartet No. 7 in F major ("Rasumovsky 1"), Op. 59/1
2. String Quartet No. 8 in E minor ("Rasumovsky 2"), Op. 59/2
3. String Quartet No. 9 in C major ("Rasumovsky 3"), Op. 59/3
4. String Quartet No. 10 in E-flat major ("Harp"), Op. 74
5. String Quartet No. 11 in F minor ("Serioso"), Op. 95

VoxBox (Classical) CDX 3031: Debussy and Ravel Quartets / New Hungarian Quartet
Second CD of 3 CD Set. Andor Toth (violin), Richard Young (violin), Denes Koromzay (viola), Andor Toth Jr. (cello)

1. String Quartet (Debussy) in G minor, Op. 10
2. String Quartet (Ravel)
