= Adolf Schiffer =

Hungarian-born Czech cellist

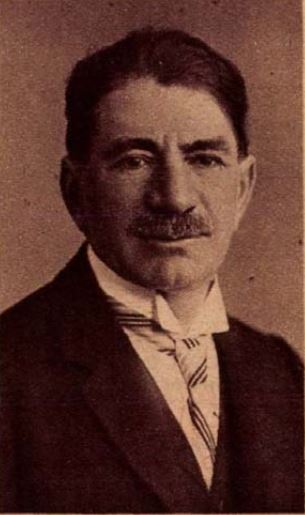
Adolf Schiffer

Adolf Schiffer (1873–1950) was a Hungarian-born Czech cellist and teacher of Jewish heritage, who for many years served as professor in cello at the Franz Liszt Academy of Music in Budapest. He is best remembered as being the link between two great cello teachers – being a student of David Popper and the teacher of János Starker.

== Life ==
Adolf Schiffer was born in Apatin, Kingdom of Hungary in 1873. He is reported to have worked as a book keeper while teaching himself cello. He reached a sufficient standard to gain a place at the Franz Liszt Academy of Music in Budapest, studying under the illustrious cellist, teacher and composer, David Popper, and being his "final protégé". János Starker has described him as “a great teacher... [whose] forte was in assisting his students to develop their natural abilities. He was a superb cellist and musician, but because of a rather late start as an instrumentalist, he limited his performances to string quartet playing."

Schiffer served as assistant to Popper, and after Popper retired, Schiffer was appointed as Professor in cello studies, a role he held until his own retirement in 1939. His most celebrated student was János Starker, who coincidentally was also one of his last students, and continued lessons with him even after Schiffer's retirement. Schiffer’s pupils include Paul Abraham, Tibor de Machula, Gábor Rejtő, Mátyás Seiber and Laszlo Varga.

In describing his teaching, Starker notes that "He used no method. He assigned material, corrected musical errors, played fragments to clarify his suggestions, and ridiculed unnatural motions that were contrary to the music. Theatricality was discouraged and dismissed as fitting only for clowns to employ in lieu of talent."

Schiffer used a Tubbs bow, which has now passed to János Starker, and has Schiffer’s name engraved on the silver of the frog.
