= Egon Petri =

Dutch-born American pianist (1881–1962)

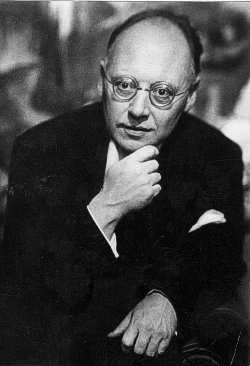
Egon Petri

Egon Petri (23 March 1881 – 27 May 1962) was a Dutch-American pianist.

== Life and career ==
Petri's family was Dutch. He was born a Dutch citizen in Hanover, Germany, and grew up in Dresden, where he attended the Kreuzschule. His father, a professional violinist, taught him to play the violin. While still a teenager, Petri played with the Dresden Court Orchestra and with his father's string quartet. He studied composition and theory with Hermann Kretzschmar and Felix Draeseke at the Dresden Conservatory.

From an early age, Petri had also taken piano lessons and eventually, with strong encouragement from Ignacy Jan Paderewski and Ferruccio Busoni, he concentrated on piano. He studied with Busoni, who greatly influenced him, and Petri considered himself more a disciple than a student of his. Following his example, Petri focused on the works of Johann Sebastian Bach and Franz Liszt, who, along with Busoni himself, were at the centre of his repertoire.

During World War I, Petri moved with Busoni to Switzerland, where he assisted him in editing Bach's keyboard works. In the 1920s, Petri taught in Berlin; his students included Victor Borge, Stanley Gardner, Jan Hoffman, Gunnar Johansen, Hazel Harrison, Dimitar Nenov, and Vitya Vronsky. In 1923 he became the first non-Soviet soloist to play in the Soviet Union.

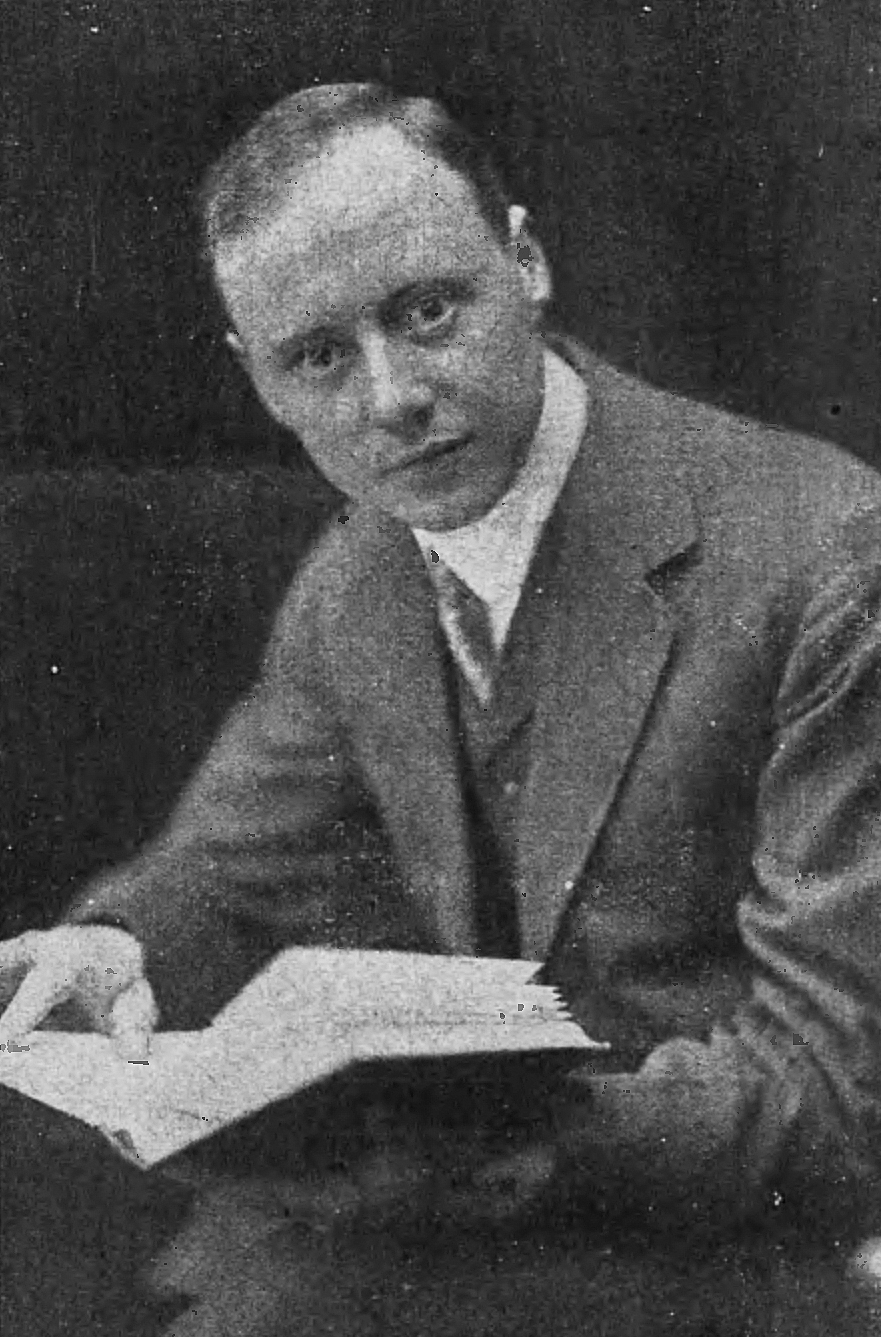
Egon Petri, 1916: photo from Nowości Ilustrowane

In 1927 he moved to Zakopane, Poland, where, until the outbreak of World War II in 1939, he conducted summer and early-fall sessions and piano master classes. Beginning in 1929, he made recordings for several labels, including Columbia Records.

Petri escaped from Poland the day before the German invasion in September 1939, but he had to leave behind all his books, music and letters, including his correspondence with Busoni (these papers survived and were recovered).

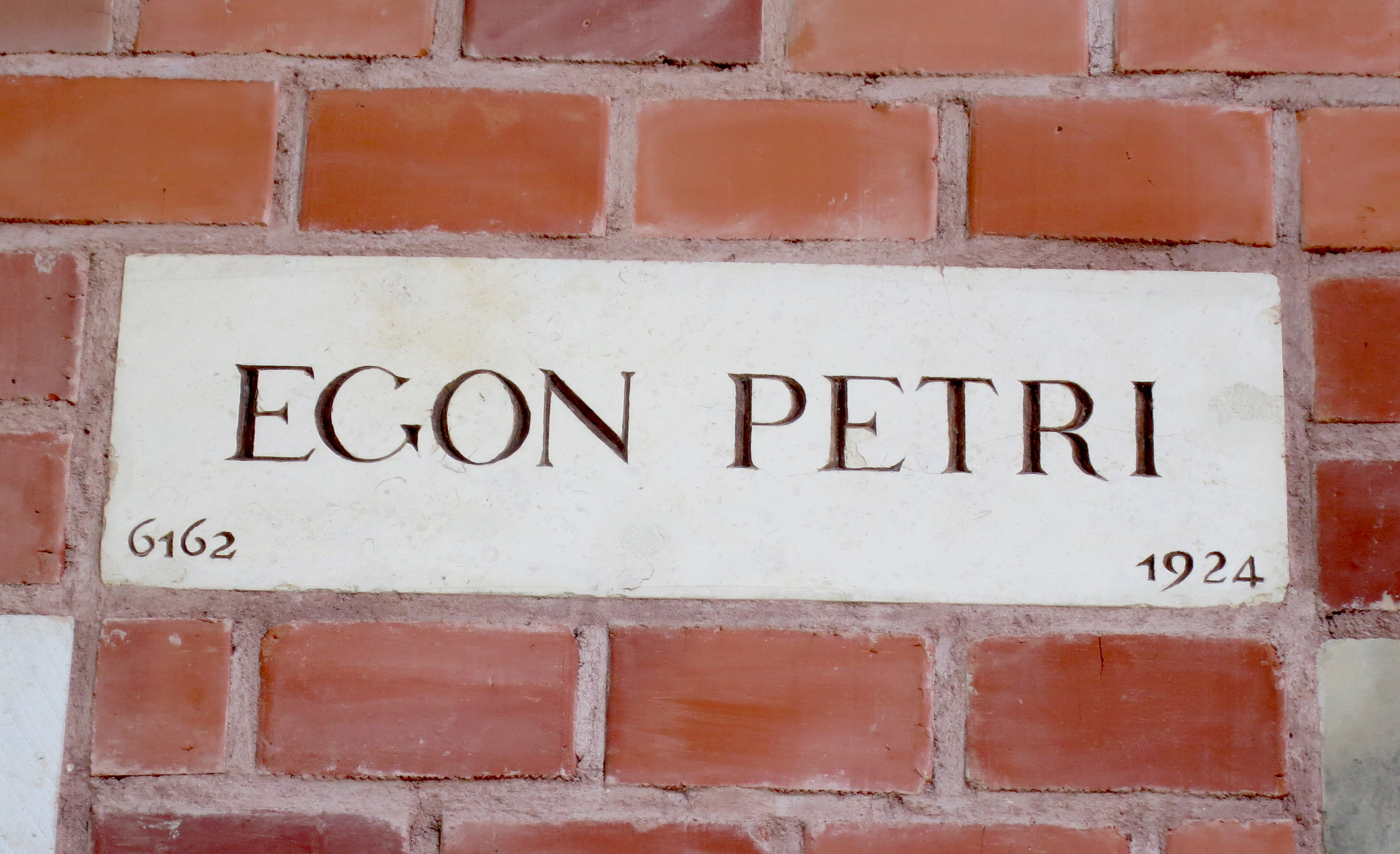
Petri's donor brick, Wawel Royal Castle, Kraków, Poland

He moved to the United States, working first at Cornell University and later at Mills College in Oakland, California. He refused ever to play in Germany again. In 1955, he became a naturalised American citizen.

Although a Dutch citizen until he was 74, he never lived in the Netherlands and was not at ease with the Dutch language. On one occasion when he performed for Queen Wilhelmina, they spoke German. He was fluent in German, English, French, Italian, Polish, and Russian.

Petri's students included Earl Wild, Ozan Marsh, John Ogdon, Dimitar Nenov and Xenia Boodberg Lee.

Petri had a superb technique and a powerful sonority and was a superlative exponent of the larger works of Beethoven, Liszt and Brahms.

Petri died on 27 May 1962, aged 81, in Berkeley, California.

=== Principles ===
From "Petri-Libermann Notes on the Art and Technique of Pianoforte Playing."

Never try to gain volume by hitting the keys.
Try to find out how little effort you need.
People are too interested in the beginning of sounds and not in their continuation.
Continuity of movement is one of my obsessions.
Draw your attention to the vibration of the strings rather than the knocking of the hammer.
I know all the rules, but if the rules don't fit, I break the rules rather than break the music.
Think primarily in terms of fingers and keys rather than arm.
What happens at the end of the fingertip is what is important.
When you change fingers unnecessarily, you invite trouble.
In very soft playing, the firmer the hand, the more control you have.
The greatest finger activity is in the knuckle joint. The fingers are prepared for both the black and white keys by the first two finger joints.
At the instant the key reaches the bottom (keyboard), four things happen: You hear the sound, you feel a resistance which stops you, you free yourself (either by releasing the key or by holding the key down lightly. Fourth is the moment you count "one" or feel the beat. This rebound feeling makes piano playing seem to be upwards.
Practice is arranging things in your mind until they become automatic.
Do not try to overcome difficulties; find another approach that causes these difficulties to vanish.

=== Practice ===
An article in The American Music Teacher in 1939 quoted Petri regarding practice: A pedestrian who was on his way to Athens met a peasant working by the roadside and asked him "How far is it to Athens?" The peasant replied, "Walk!" The man said "I know I have to walk, but tell me how long will it take me to get there?" The peasant repeated, "Walk!" When the third inquiry drew forth the same information, the traveler, giving the peasant up as a hopeless idiot, walked away with great strides. After a few seconds the peasant called out: "Half an hour!" Greatly surprised, the man turned back and said: "Why did you not tell me that at once?" Whereupon the peasant replied, "How could I tell you before I saw how you walked?" So what would be the use of telling a pupil how long to practice without knowing how he practiced? You can't help being your own teacher and pupil when you practice. If you learn quickly and incorrectly, that's bad. If you learn quickly and correctly, that's good. If you learn slowly and correctly, that is also good. But if you learn slowly and incorrectly, that's the worst. If you do the exercises right, you don't need them. If you do them wrong, they may do you harm.

=== Witticisms ===
Art consists of a lot of very fine details made correctly.
I am here to defend the composer.
In playing, think everything in curves: no angles, no stops, and no jerks.
This is a principle of life: Calm is based on confidence.
Subtle differences of accent are a case of mental division. Like "men’s wear" as opposed to "men swear."
Meter is something invented by man, like the metronome, the clock, etc.
Rhythm is something in nature, where nothing is quite alike.
Pedal: A very beautiful but dangerous instrument.
Rubato is like a man walking his dog. Sometimes the dog is ahead, sometimes behind, but both go and come back together.
Phrasing in music is like speaking or reading, observing punctuation marks, and dynamics are like voice inflection. Don't overdo or underdo either.
Remember that technique is mental rather than physical. Therefore, it is necessary to will a movement before making it.
Music is so lovely when it's left alone.
Any child can make a loud and nasty sound on the piano.
Most pianists spend their expression in small coin.
People who talk too much about interpretation are apt not to be humble enough. I try not to overshadow the composer.

== See also ==
- List of Poles
