= Mischa Mischakoff =

American musician

- Міша Мішаков
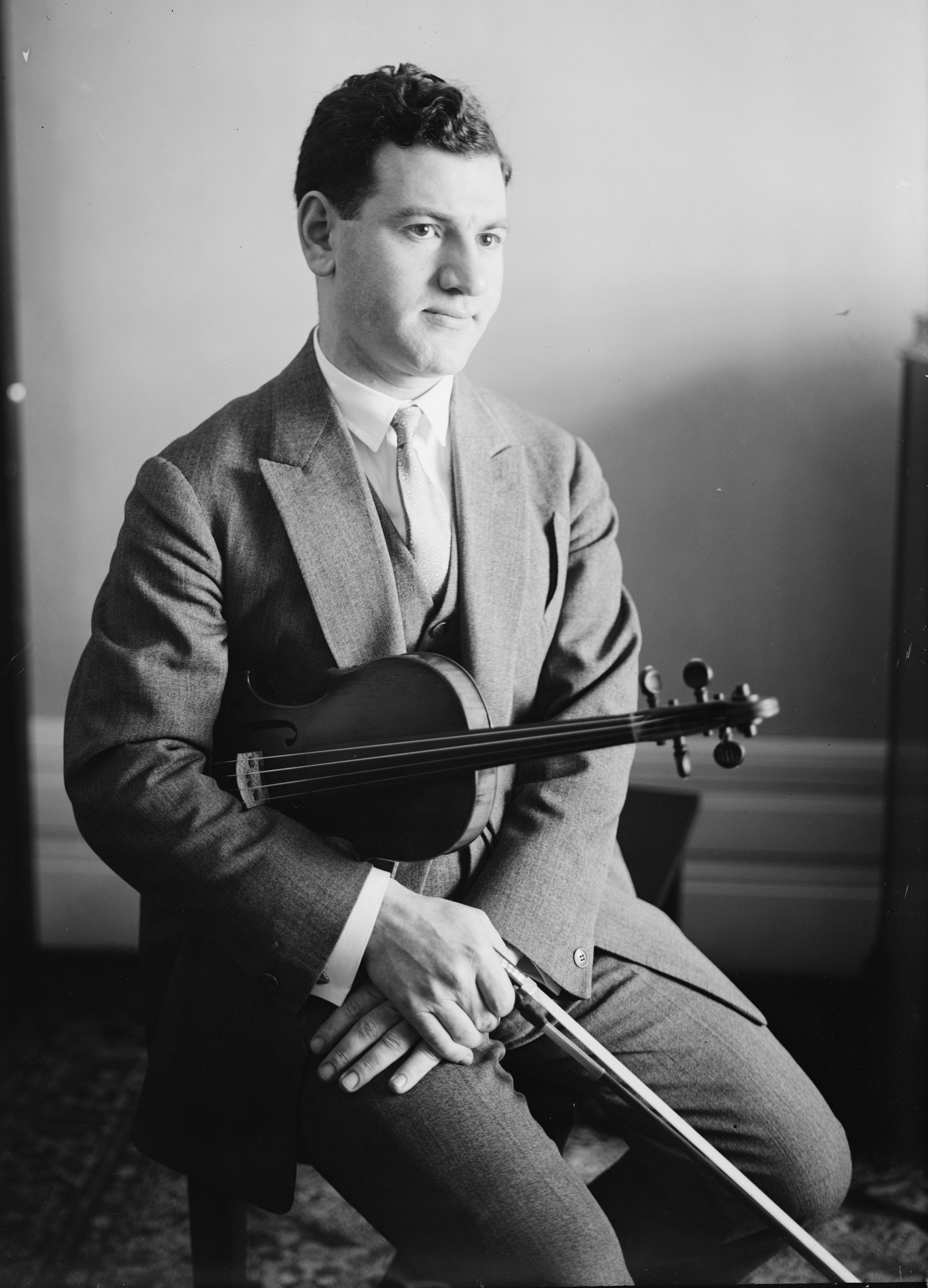
- Born: Mykhailo Isaakovych Fishberg; April 16, 1895; Proskuriv, Russian Empire (now Khmelnytskyi, Ukraine)
- Died: February 1, 1981 (aged 85); Petoskey, Michigan, US
- Occupation: Violinist

Mischa Mischakoff (Note: Ukrainian: Міша Мішаков, romanized: Misha Mishakov) (April 16, 1895 – February 1, 1981, born Mykhailo Isaakovych Fishberg (Note: Ukrainian: Михайло Ісаакович Фішберг, romanized: Mykhailo Isaakovych Fishberh)) was an outstanding violinist who, as a concertmaster, led many of America's greatest orchestras from the 1920s to the 1960s.

Mischakoff was born in Proskuriv, Russian Empire (now Khmelnytskyi, Ukraine). In 1921 he escaped from Russia with, among others, his friend and colleague, cellist Gregor Piatigorsky, with whom he had played in the Bolshoi Theatre in Moscow. Mischakoff emigrated to the United States later that year, becoming a naturalized citizen in 1927.

He led the string sections of the St. Petersburg Conservatory Orchestra, St. Petersburg Philharmonic Orchestra, Moscow Bolshoi Theatre, Warsaw Philharmonic Orchestra, then, after his arrival in the United States, the New York Symphony under Walter Damrosch (1924–1927), the Philadelphia Orchestra under Leopold Stokowski (1927–1930), the Chicago Symphony Orchestra under Frederick Stock (1930–1937), the NBC Symphony Orchestra under Arturo Toscanini (1937–1952), the Detroit Symphony Orchestra under Paul Paray (1952–1968), as well as, in retirement, the Baltimore Symphony Orchestra.

Mischa Mischakoff also led the Mischakoff String Quartet in the various cities where he lived, and between 1940 and 1952 he taught at the Juilliard School in New York. He then taught at Wayne State University in Detroit between 1952 and about 1980.

Mischakoff died on February 1, 1981, in Petoskey, Michigan. He owned four Stradivari violins, on which he appeared as soloist and recitalist, as well as a number of other fine violins by old and contemporary makers.

== Acclaim and criticism ==
In 1951, Joseph Wechsberg wrote in Holiday Magazine that for a mythical dream orchestra composed of America's major orchestral leaders, Mischakoff would be the pick among concertmasters for head of first violins.

== Private life ==
Mischakoff was survived by his wife, Hortense, their two sons, Paul and Matthew and their daughter, Anne Mischakoff Heiles. Anne played in the Detroit Symphony Orchestra with her father. She later wrote his biography, published in 2006.

== Notes ==
The biography of Mischa Mischakoff does not include his long association as concertmaster of the Chautauqua Symphony at Chautauqua Institution, Chautauqua NY. There, Mischakoff also led the Mischakoff String Quartet which gave weekly recitals during the summer season.
