= Maurice Wilk =

American violinist

Maurice Wilk was a well-known American violinist who performed as a member of the Alma Trio from 1953 until his sudden death in 1963.

He was the original violinist in the Bach Aria Group during the late 1940s. The other original members of the Bach Aria Group were Bernard Greenhouse (cello); Menahem Pressler (piano); and Robert Bloom (oboe). During the 1950s he was a faculty member at Columbia University in New York City.

In memory of Wilk, Otto Luening wrote the Elegy for violin solo.
