= Zoltán Székely =

Hungarian violinist and composer (1903 - 2001)

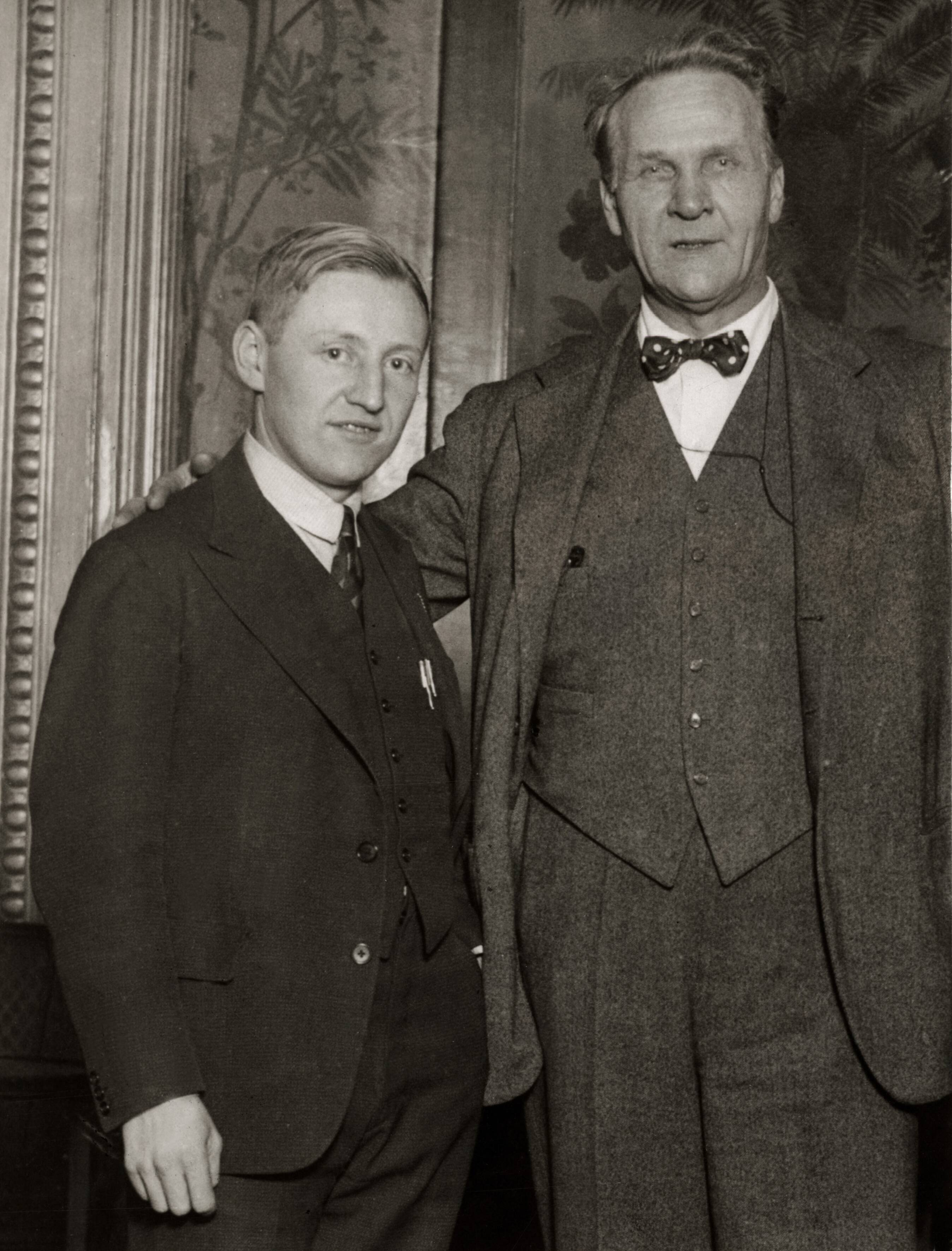
Székely & Chaliapin (1931)

Zoltán Székely (Hungarian: Székely Zoltán; 8 December 1903 in Kocs, Hungary – 5 October 2001 in Banff, Canada) was a Hungarian violinist and composer.

== Biography ==
Székely studied violin with Jenő Hubay and composition with Zoltán Kodály at the Franz Liszt Academy in Budapest. He composed mainly chamber music. Székely toured Europe with the virtuoso young cellist Paul Hermann. Székely was a friend of Béla Bartók and was the one to request the composition of Bartók's Second Violin Concerto and its dedicatee as well as performer at its premiere in March, 1939, Mengelberg conducting. The performance was a live broadcast and was recorded by Radio Hilversum on 78 RPM acetates, the most used recording medium at the time. For several years he lived in the Netherlands and from 1940–1941 he was leader/concertmaster of the Royal Concertgebouw Orchestra under Willem Mengelberg. He later went to live in the USA and Canada. Zoltan Szekely joined the Hungarian String Quartet in its second year, and played the first violin from 1937 until the quartet disbanded in 1972. He was named Honorary Professor by the Franz Liszt Academy in 1981, which marked Bartók's centenary.

Székely transcribed Bartók's Romanian Folk Dances for violin and piano.
