= Gábor Rejtő =

Hungarian cellist (1916–1987)

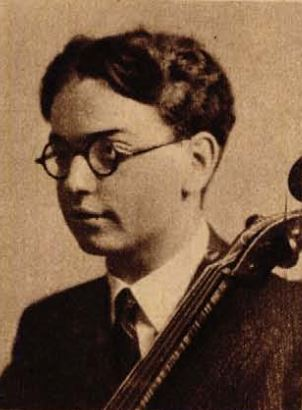
- Rejtő in 1935

Background information
- Born: 23 January 1916; Budapest, Austria-Hungary
- Died: 26 June 1987 (aged 71) Los Angeles, California, U.S.
- Genres: Classical; chamber
- Occupation: Musician
- Instrument: Cello

Gábor Rejtő, also known as Gabor Rejto (23 January 1916 – 26 June 1987), was a Hungarian cellist who performed with various artists and chamber music ensembles in the 20th century.

== Biography ==
=== Early life ===
Rejtő was born in Budapest into a Jewish family. His first cello teacher was Frederick Teller, a local teacher whose ideas, for the time, were exceptionally forward-looking. At sixteen, Rejtő entered the Academy of Music under Adolf Schiffer (a pupil of and later assistant to David Popper), and two years later, with his Artist's Diploma, he began his European concert career.

=== Education ===
From the age of 20, Rejtő studied with Pablo Casals for two years, first in Barcelona and then in Prades. Casals had revolutionized the approach to the cello and when he worked with Rejtő, they spent almost a month on just basic technique. Rejtő then played in concerts throughout Europe, with major symphony orchestras such as those in Vienna, Budapest, Rome, and Warsaw, as well as in solo recitals.

=== Career ===
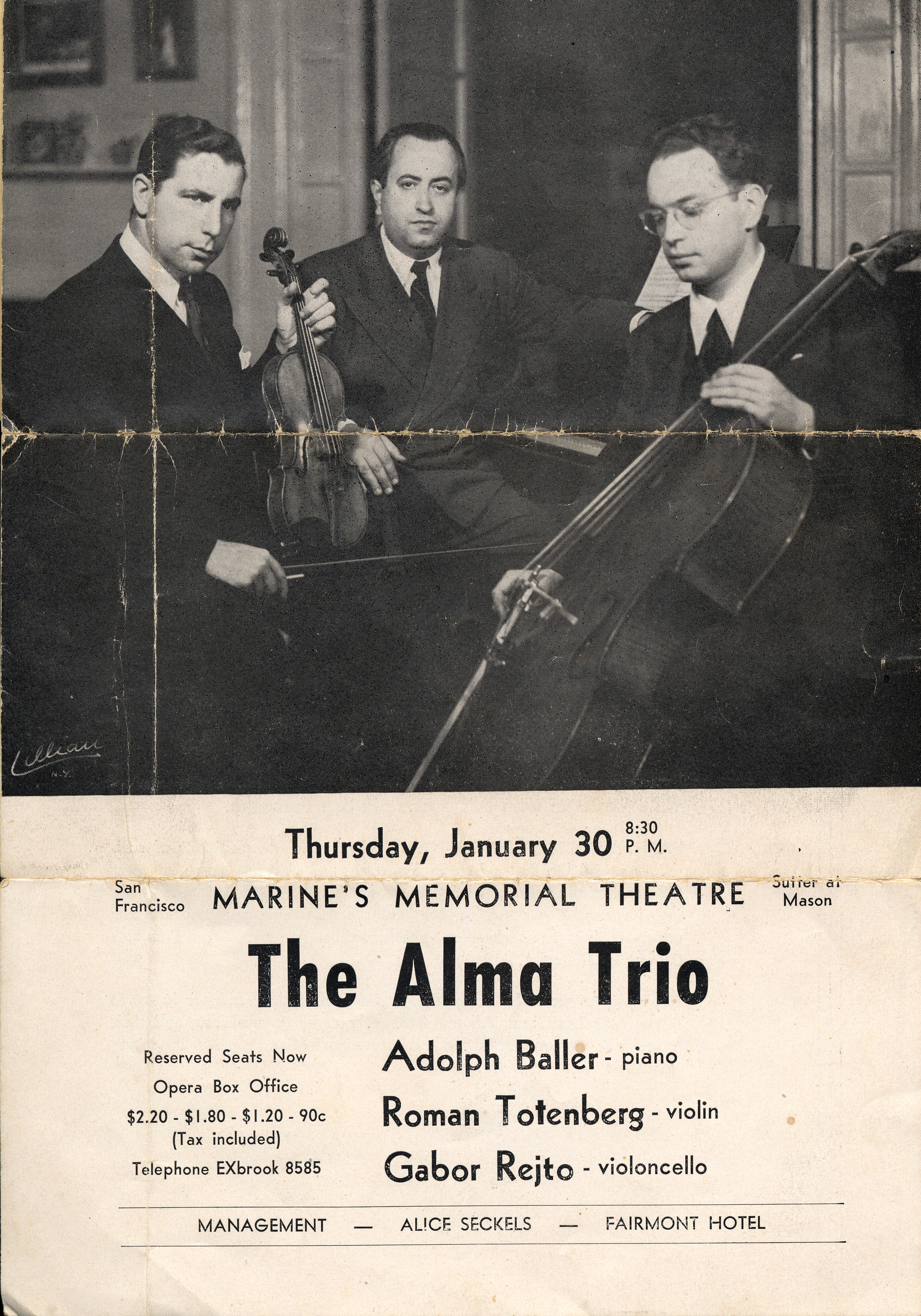
Gábor Rejtő with the Alma Trio, 1947

In 1952, Rejtő and Yaltah Menuhin undertook a tour of New Zealand together. Over a period of five weeks, they gave twenty-five concerts to great critical acclaim.

Rejto was a resident of the United States from 1939 until his death. During his career, he was on the faculty of the Manhattan and Eastman Schools of Music. From 1954 to his death, he was professor of cello at the University of Southern California. He was also one of the cellists in the Paganini Quartet and the Hungarian Quartet, and was a founding member of the Alma Trio, a piano trio, and remained with that ensemble from 1942 until it disbanded in 1976; in the early 1980s, the trio reformed, with Rejto again as the cellist. Rejto taught for a number of years at the Music Academy of the West summer program for gifted students, where his master classes were extremely popular, not just with cellists. His experience in chamber music attracted many students to his cello workshops held throughout the United States.

In 1972, Rejtő was chosen Artist Teacher of the Year at the American String Teachers Association's 25th Anniversary Conference.

=== Family ===
Rejtő's son, Peter Rejto, is a cellist and a former faculty member at the Oberlin Conservatory. He was a founding member of the Los Angeles Piano Quartet. Gábor Rejtő's daughter, Nika S. Rejto, is a jazz flutist. She released an album entitled Teazing Socrates in 2006, dedicated to her late father.

== See also ==
- Andor Toth Jr.

== Published mentions and biographies ==
- cited in The Great Cellists by Margaret Campbell ISBN 978-1-86105-654-2
