= Hungarian Quartet =

Musical ensemble

The Hungarian String Quartet was a musical ensemble of world renown, particularly famous for its performances of quartets by Beethoven and Bartók. The quartet was founded in Budapest in 1935 (as the New Hungarian Quartet) and was disbanded in 1972.

== Members ==
Period	1st violin	2nd violin	Viola	Violoncello
1935–1937	Sándor Végh	Péter Szervánszky	Dénes Koromzay	Pál Hermann
1937–1940	Zoltán Székely	Sándor Végh	Dénes Koromzay	Pál Hermann
1940–1956	Zoltán Székely	Alexandre Moszkowsky	Dénes Koromzay	Vilmos Palotai
1956–1959	Zoltán Székely	Alexandre Moszkowsky	Dénes Koromzay	Gábor Magyar
1959–1972	Zoltán Székely	Mihály Kuttner	Dénes Koromzay	Gábor Magyar

== Origins ==
The Quartet was originally brought together when two students of Jenő Hubay – Sándor Végh on violin and Dénes Koromzay on viola – as well as violinist Zoltán Székely and violoncellist Pál Hermann, were recruited in 1937. At that point Sándor Végh moved to the second violin desk, and in 1940 he left to found the Végh Quartet. He was then replaced by the Russian Alexandre Moszkowsky. The Quartet had made its debut in 1935, and met with swift success. Szekely was a friend of Béla Bartók's, and the group became rapidly known by giving the Hungarian première performance of the Bartok 5th Quartet, which it studied with the composer. By 1938, the group had been heard in every major city of Western Europe.

During the war they were trapped in the Netherlands, and devoted the period to the intensive study of the Beethoven quartets, which were subsequently launched upon the world in the brilliant career which the group achieved after 1945. In 1950 they settled in the USA. In around 1956 the cello, and around 1960 the second violin desk, was reassigned, and in this new form the Quartet continued to maintain its busy programme of performance until 1972, while also undertaking teaching positions and the coaching of younger instrumentalists. In 1957, the newly configured Quartet performed in Boston for the Peabody Mason Concert series. In 1958 the quartet completed a Southern Africa tour, much appreciated by the local audience

In the 1966 issue recordings of the Beethoven cycle, it is stated that Székely plays the 'Michelangelo' Stradivarius (1718), Kuttner plays the 'Santa Theresa' Petrus Guarnerius (1704), Koromzay plays a 1766 instrument by M. Decanet, and Magyar has a cello by Alessandro Gagliano of 1706.

== Recordings ==
(Examples)

- Schubert: Quartet in D minor 'Death and the Maiden' D 810 (Nixa LP CLP 1152) (About 1952).
- Schubert: Quartet in D minor 'Death and the Maiden' D 810 (Vox LP STPL 512.520).
- Schubert: Quartet in G major D 887 (Columbia CX 1566) (EMG review Sep 1958).
- Schubert: Quintet in A major D 667 'The Trout' with Louis Kentner, Georg Hörtnagel (Vox STPL 512.690).
- Schumann: Quintet in E flat major op 44, with George Solchany, piano. (Székely-Moszkowsky-Koromzay-Magyar) (Discophiles Français LP DF 730.030).
- Haydn: Quartets op 64 no 5; op 76 no 2 (Columbia LP CX 1527) (EMG review July 1958).
- Haydn: Quartets in D major op 64 no 5; in F major op 77 no 2 (Vox STPL 512.080).
- Mozart: Quartets in E flat major K 428; in A major K 464 (Columbia LP CX 1599). (EMG reviews May 1959).
- Mozart: Quartets in B flat major K 458; in C major K 475 (STPL 512.130).
- Tchaikovsky: Quartet no 1 in D major op 11 (Columbia LP CX 1581). (EMG review March 1959).
- Borodin: Quartet no 2 in D major (Columbia LP CX 1581). (EMG review March 1959).
- Kodály: Quartet no 2 in D major (Columbia LP CX 1614) (EMG review Jan 1959).
- Villa-Lobos: Quartet no 6 (Columbia LP CX 1614) (EMG review Jan 1959).
- Bartók: The 6 string Quartets (Deutsche Grammophon 138650, 138651 & 138652, 1962).

There are two complete cycles of the Beethoven quartets, both recorded in Paris:

- Mono 1953 set with the Székely-Moszkowsky-Koromzay-Palotai line-up.
- Stereo set (1960s) with the Székely-Kuttner-Koromzay-Magyar group. In UK this was issued on His Master's Voice in 1966 in the HQS series.

== Sources ==
- E.M.G., The Art of Record Buying 1960 (EMG, London 1960).
- E. Sackville-West and D. Shawe-Taylor, The Record Year 2 (Collins, London 1953).
- R. Stowell, The Cambridge Companion to the String Quartet (Cambridge 2003).
- Hungarian Quartet, Beethoven Quartet recordings (His Master's Voice, Hayes 1966). (Sleevenotes.)
- Hungarian Quartet, Schubert D 810 recording (Vox, New York STPL 512.520). (Sleevenotes.)
- C. Kenneson, Székely and Bartok: the story of a friendship (Amadeus Publications 1994).
- Obituary of Koromzay and archived
- Obituary of Székely
- Buffalo Chamber Music Society checklist of dates
