= Patricia Kopatchinskaja =

Moldovan-Austrian musician

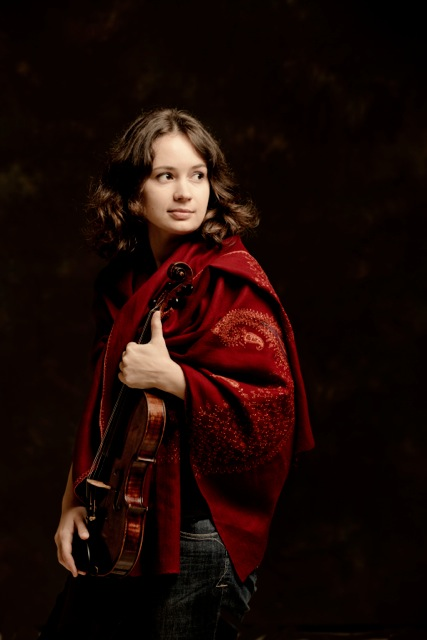
- Kopatchinskaja in 2012

Background information
- Born: March 1977 (age 49); Chișinău, Moldavian Soviet Socialist Republic, Soviet Union
- Genre: Classical music
- Instrument: Violin
- Website: patriciakopatchinskaja.com

Patricia Kopatchinskaja (born March 1977) is a Moldovan-Austrian-Swiss violinist.

== Biography ==
=== Early life ===
Kopatchinskaja was born in Chișinău, in the Moldavian Soviet Socialist Republic (now Moldova). She comes from a family of musicians. Her parents were both with the state folk ensemble of Moldova: her mother, Emilia Kopatchinskaja, was a violinist, and her father, Viktor Kopatchinsky, was a cimbalom player. While her parents were on concert tour through the former Eastern bloc, she grew up with her grandparents. She started playing the violin at age 6.

In 1989, the family fled to Vienna. Kopatchinskaja entered the University of Music and Performing Arts, Vienna at age 17, where she studied musical composition and violin. From age 21 to 23, she finished her studies in Bern, at the Musikhochschule, where her teachers included Igor Ozim. Kopatchinskaja lives in Bern, and has a daughter.

=== Career ===
In 2016, Kopatchinskaja wrote an editorial for The Guardian outlining her approach to music and her career and her preference for playing music "from the borders" of the repertoire instead of the standard repertoire of "Bach, Beethoven, Brahms, Bruckner, and Bruch." She later said, "Standard pieces should be used only as exceptional, rare elements in programmes. There are enough recordings out there already.… The classical music industry is so far behind. If someone does anything that’s even just a tiny bit different, it becomes a huge, heated discussion."

In 2014, the British Royal Philharmonic Society gave Kopatchinskaja one of its annual Music Awards in the instrumentalist category, calling her an "irresistible force of nature: passionate, challenging and totally original in her approach".

==== Composer ====
Composition has always been part of Kopatchinskaja's activity. Her more recent works are published by Birdsong and have been played by Sol Gabetta, Vilde Frang, Nicolas Altstaedt, and the Trio Gaspard, among others. Her compositions are listed on her website.

==== Soloist ====
Kopatchinskaja has played with most of the important European orchestras including Vienna, Berlin and London Philharmonic. She regularly plays in North America, Japan, and Australia, and has also played in South America, Russia, and China. She has ongoing collaborations with conductors including Elim Chan, Teodor Currentzis, Thomas Dausgaard, Iván Fischer, Gustavo Gimeno, Mirga Gražinytė-Tyla, Jakub Hrusa, Vladimir Jurowski, Andrés Orozco-Estrada, Kirill Petrenko, Simon Rattle, Lorenzo Viotti, François-Xavier Roth, Sakari Oramo, Péter Eötvös, Nayden Todorov, and Tito Muñoz.

==== Leading orchestras and festivals ====
Kopatchinskaja's experience as a leader of ensembles and chamber orchestras includes a tour with Britten Sinfonia, repeated tours with Mahler Chamber Orchestra and Australian Chamber Orchestra and being an artistic partner of the Saint Paul Chamber Orchestra since 2014. Presently she is an artistic partner of the Camerata Bern. She has organised several staged concert productions, including "Death and the Maiden" with the Saint Paul Chamber Orchestra, "Bye-Bye Beethoven" with the Mahler Chamber Orchestra, "Dies Irae" with Lucerne Festival Alumni, and "War and Chips" and "Time and Eternity" with Camerata Bern.

From 2003 to 2005 Kopatchinskaja organised the Rüttihubeliade festival in the Swiss Alps. In June 2018, she was the music director of the Ojai Music Festival in California.

==== Chamber music partners ====
Regular chamber music partners include cellist Sol Gabetta, clarinettist Reto Bieri and the pianists Joonas Ahonen, Markus Hinterhäuser, Polina Leschenko and Anthony Romaniuk. In April 2016, Kopatchinskaja performed with Anoushka Shankar at a concert in Konzerthaus Berlin, Germany. They played Raga Piloo, which Ravi Shankar composed, performed, and recorded as a duet with Yehudi Menuhin on the 1968 album West Meets East, Volume 2.

==== Historically informed performance ====
Kopatchinskaja has collaborated with Il Giardino Armonico, the Akademie für Alte Musik Berlin, MusicAeterna, the Orchestre des Champs-Élysées, the Orchestra of the Age of Enlightenment under the direction of Giovanni Antonini, René Jacobs and Philippe Herreweghe. She also has performed with Sir Roger Norrington and Roy Goodman.

==== New music and works ====
Kopatchinskaja has been outspoken in her support of new works and living composers, as well as works not considered part of the standard violin repertoire. She has performed and recorded works by Luca Francesconi, Francisco Coll García, Mark-Anthony Turnage, Sanchez-Chiong, Stefano Gervasoni, Simone Movio, Michael Hersch, Esa Pekka Salonen, Péter Eötvös, Heinz Holliger, and Michel van der Aa. Her "Time and Eternity" program with Camerata Bern, recorded for Alpha Classics, featured music by John Zorn, Ikonnikow, Tadeusz Sygietynski, Machaut, and Bach, along with Karl Amadeus Hartmann's Concerto Funebre.

==== Voice ====
Kopatchinskaja uses the voice in several compositions, including John Cage's Living Room Music, Jorge Sanchez-Chiong's Crin, Michael Hersch's Duo for violin and cello Das Rückgrat berstend, Heinz Holliger's Das kleine Irgendwas, her own cadenza for György Ligeti's Violin Concerto, and Otto Zykan's Das mit der Stimme.

In 2017, Kopatchinskaja performed the voice part (Sprechgesang) in Arnold Schoenberg's Pierrot lunaire in the USA and since 2018 has performed the piece many times with, among others, members of the Berlin Philharmonic, the Montreal and Göteborg Symphonies, and her own ensemble.

In 2018–19, Kopatchinskaja and some friends made a film based on Kurt Schwitters's Dadaistic nonsense poem "Ursonate" (1932). It has been shown at several festivals.

== Violin ==
Kopatchinskaja plays a violin by Giovanni Francesco Pressenda (Turin) in 1834, which The Strad's Dennis Rooney called "a very colourful-sounding instrument whose viola-like quality lent her playing exceptional tonal interest". In 2010, she briefly played the 1741 "ex-Carrodus" violin by Guarneri del Gesù, on loan from the Austrian National Bank but had to give it back because of unresolvable problems with Swiss customs authorities. In period-instrument environments, she uses a violin by Ferdinando Gagliano (Naples, ca. 1780, mounted with a lowered bridge and gut strings) and appropriate bows.

== First performances ==
Kopatchinskaja has given first performances of numerous works, e.g.:

- 2004/5 seven first performances, among them violin concertos dedicated to her by Johanna Doderer and Otto Zykan
- 2005/6 first performances of violin concertos dedicated to her by Gerald Resch and Gerd Kühr with the Vienna Radio Symphony Orchestra
- 2007/8 first performances of violin concertos dedicated to her by Jürg Wyttenbach and the Turkish composer/pianist Fazıl Say
- 2009 first performance of the violin concerto dedicated to her by Faradj Karajew
- 2011 first performance of violin concertos dedicated to her by Maurizio Sotelo and Helmut Oehring ("Four seasons") as well as the work "Oh whispering suns" for double choir, solo violin and cymbal by Vanessa Lann
- 2012 first performance of the Romance for violin and strings dedicated to her by Tigran Mansurian with Amsterdam Sinfonietta.
- 2014 first performance of her own violin concerto "Hortus animae" with Camerata Bern.
- 2015 (August) first performance of «Dialogue», concerto for Violin, Cello and Orchestra by Mark-Anthony Turnage (with Sol Gabetta and Gstaad Festival Orchestra).
- 2015 (November) first performance of the violin concerto written for her by the American composer Michael Hersch with the Saint Paul Chamber Orchestra.
- 2016 first performance of Mauricio Sotelo's "Red Inner Light Sculpture" for Solo Violin, Strings, percussion and Flamenco Dancer (commissioned by P.K.)
- 2017 first performance of Michael Hersch's duet for violin and cello "Das Rückgrat berstend", with Jay Campbell.
- 2019 first performance of Michel van der Aa's Double concerto for violin and violoncello with Sol Gabetta, Concertgebouw Orchestra and Peter Eötvös.
- 2019 first performance of Francisco Coll's double concerto für violin and violoncello with Sol Gabetta und Camerata Bern, composer directing.
- 2019 first performance of Francisco Coll's LaLuLa-Lied.
- 2019 first performance of the duo for violin and cello by Marton Illes with Jay Campbell in Santa Barbara, California.
- 2020 first performance of the violin concerto by Marton Illes with WDR-Orchestra Cologne, directed by Michael Wendeberg
- 2020 first performance of the violin concerto by Francisco Coll with Luxembourg Philharmonic directed by Gustavo Gimeno.
- 2020 first performance of the violin concerto "Possible Places" by Dmitri Kourliandski (b.1976) with SWR-orchestra Stuttgart and Teodor Currentzis.
- 2020 First performance of the double concerto for two violins "Gemini" by Helene Winkelmann, with Helene Winkelmann, Basel Symphony Orchestra and Ivor Bolton.
- 2021 First performance of the violin concerto "Corpo elettrico" by Luca Francesconi in Porto with Orquestra Sinfónica Casa da Música and Stephan Blunier (followed by the French premiere in Paris).
- 2021 First performance of the concerto for violin, orchestra and electronics by Fred Popovici with Moldova Philharmonic Orchestra Iasi (Romania) and Adrian Petrescu in Iasi und Bucarest
- 2023: 2. Violin concerto Not alone we fly by Aureliano Cattaneo, with Philharmonie Essen and Jonathan Stockhammer (cond.)
- 2024: "A play", concerto for violin, cello and orchestra by Patricia Kopatchinskaja (patkop), with Sol Gabetta, Orchestra della Svizzera Italiana and Markus Poschner (cond.).

Richard Carrick, Violeta Dinescu, Michalis Economou, Heinz Holliger, Ludwig Nussbichler, Jorge Sánchez-Chiong, Ivan Sokolov, and Boris Yoffe have also written works for her.

== Awards ==
- 1997: 2nd prize in the age group 18 to 23 in the category "Strings" at the Classica Nova International Competition In Memoriam Dmitri Shostakovich in Hanover, Germany
- 2000: 1st prize in the International Henryk Szeryng Competition in Mexico
- 2002: Credit Suisse Young Artist Award
- 2004: New Talent – SPP Award of the European Broadcasting Union (EBU)
- 2006: Deutschlandfunk-award of the Bremer Musikfest
- 2008: Award of the music commission Kanton Bern, Switzerland
- 2009: ECHO in the category chamber music for the CD recorded with Fazıl Say (works by Beethoven, Ravel, Bártok & Say)
- 2010: BBC-Music-Magazine award (orchestral category) for the CD recorded with Philippe Herreweghe and the Orchestre des Champs Elysees: Collected works for violin and orchestra by Beethoven
- 2011: "Golden Bow"-award of the Meiringen music festival, Switzerland
- 2012: Praetorius music award of the county Niedersachsen, Germany in the category "musical innovation"
- 2013: ECHO in the category concert recording of the year (20th/21st century/violin) for the double-CD with violin concertos by Bartók, Ligeti and Eötvös, recorded with the hr-Sinfonieorchester Frankfurt respectively Ensemble Modern under Peter Eötvös (Naive)
- 2013: Gramophone Award "Recording of the year" and Grammy-nomination, both for the double-CD with violin concertos by Bartók, Ligeti and Eötvös, recorded with the hr-Sinfonieorchester Frankfurt respectively Ensemble Modern under Peter Eötvös (Naive)
- 2014: International Classical Music Awards (Category Concerto) for the double CD with violin concertos by Bartók, Ligeti and Eötvös
- 2014: Prix Caecilia (Belgium) for the CD with violin concertos by Stravinsky and Prokofjev recorded with London Philharmonic Orchestra and Vladimir Jurowski (Naive)
- 2014: Royal Philharmonic Society Music Awards 2013 (Category instrumentalist)
- 2016: Music Award of the Canton of Bern, Switzerland for "remarkable musical achievements"
- 2017: Grand Prix of the Swiss Music Awards
- 2018: Grammy in the ‘Best Chamber Music/Small Ensemble Performance’ category for her Death & The Maiden album with the Saint Paul Chamber Orchestra on Alpha Classics
- 2019: 29. Würth Prize of Jeunesses Musicales Germany
- 2020: Honorary Membership Konzerthausgesellschaft Vienna
- 2021: OPUS KLASSIK-Award and Edison-Award for What's Next Vivaldi? (CD Alpha Classics) with Giardino Armonico directed by Giovanni Antonini
- 2022: BBC Music Magazine award, category concerto for CD "Plaisirs illuminés" (Alpha Classics) with Camerata Bern, Sol Gabetta and Francisco Coll.
- 2024: Österreichischer Kunstpreis für Musik
- 2025: Honorary Membership of the Royal College of Music (Hon RAM)
- 2025: Doctor honoris causa of the University of Bern, Switzerland, Faculty of Theology

== Discography ==
| released | pieces | collaborators | publisher/Nr. | type |
|---|---|---|---|---|
| 1998 | ein klang 1996–1998 Johanna Doderer: Awakening 2 for three Violins | Kinga Voss (Violin); Jacqueline Kopacinski (Violin) | Einklang Records 001/002 | Double-CD |
| 2001 | An Introduction To Dmitri Smirnov: Elegy (in Memory of Edison Denisov) for cello solo; String of Destiny (Piano Sonata No.4) for piano; "Es ist..." (Violin Sonata No.3); Trio for violin, cello and piano; Sonata (for cello and piano); Postlude (in Memory of Alfred Schnittke) for violin solo | Alexander Iwashkin (cello); Ivan Sokolov (piano) | Megadisc 7818 | CD |
| 2001 | Nikolai Korndorf: In Honour of Alfred Schnittke (trio for violin, viola and cello); Passacaglia for cello solo; Are you ready, Brother? (trio for piano, violin and cello) | Daniel Raiskin (viola); Alexander Iwashkin (cello); Ivan Sokolov (piano) | Megadisc 7817 | CD |
| 2004 | Boris Yoffe, 32 poems from the quartet book | Daniel Kobyliansky (violin); Boris Yoffe (viola); Dichtiar Druski (cello) | Antes Edition, Bella Musica 319192 | CD |
| 2006 | Jubilee-CD Classics (50 years DRS 2) on CD Nr.10. („Young Talents“) by Kopatchinskaja George Enescu: Third Sonata (Dans le charactère populaire roumain); 1. Moderato malinconico; 2. Andante sostenuto e misterioso; 3. Allegro con brio, ma non troppo mosso | Mihaela Ursuleasa (piano) | Swiss Radio DRS2, CDL1710 | 10 CDs |
| 2006 | Johanna Doderer: For violin and orchestra (dedicated to Kopatchinskaja); Bolero for two pianos and orchestra; Rondane for orchestra | Wiener Konzertverein; Ulf Schirmer (conductor) | Edition Zeitton des ORF 2009336 | CD |
| 2007 | Boris Yoffe, Musical Semantics Boris Yoffe: Seven poems from the quartet book; Essay; Leicht, aber mit Hingabe | Daniel Kobylianski (violin); Jacqueline Kopacinski (violin); Roman Spitzer (viola); Druski Dichtiar (cello); Angela Yoffe (piano) | Megadisc MDC 7798 | CD |
| 2008 | Fazıl Say 1001 Nights in the Harem Fazıl Say: Violin concerto '1001 nights in the harem' | Lucerne Symphony Orchestra; John Axelrod (conductor) | Naïve, V 5147 | CD |
| 2008 | Gerd Kühr: Movimenti for violin and orchestra (2006); Gerald Resch: "Schlieren" concerto for Violin and orchestra (2005); Otto Zykan: "Da unten im Tale" concerto for violin and orchestra (2004, dedicated to P.K.) | Radio-Symphony Orchestra Vienna (RSO); Stefan Asbury (conductor); Johannes Kalitzke (conductor); Bertrand de Billy (conductor) | col legno, WWE 1CD 20279 | CD |
| 2009 | Beethoven: Complete works for violin and orchestra Ludwig van Beethoven: Concerto for violin and orchestra D-Major op. 61; Romance for violin and orchestra Nr. 2 F-Major op. 50; Romanze for violin and orchestra Nr. 1 G-Major op. 40; Concerto for violin and orchestra C-Major WoO 5, fragment of the first movement | Orchestre des Champs-Élysées; Philippe Herreweghe (conductor) | Naïve, V 5174 | CD |
| 2009 | Ludwig van Beethoven: Violin sonata Nr. 9 („Kreutzer“); Maurice Ravel: Violin sonata in G-Major; Béla Bartók: 6 Roumanian folk dances; Fazıl Say: Violin sonata op. 7 | Patricia Kopatchinskaja (violin); Fazıl Say (piano) | Naïve, V 5146 | CD |
| 2010 | Patricia Kopatchinskaja: Rapsodia – Music from my homeland: Works by Enescu, Kurtag, Ligeti, Sánchez-Chiong, Ravel, Moldovan Folklore | Patricia Kopatchinskaja (violin); Emilia Kopatchinskaja (violin & viola); Viktor Kopatchinsky (cymbalom); Martin Gjakonovski (double bass); Mihaela Ursuleasa (piano) | Naïve, V 5193 | CD |
| 2012 | Three Hungarian violin concertos: Bartók: Violin concerto Nr. 2; Eötvös: Violin concerto Nr. 1 ("Seven"); Ligeti: Violin concerto | Symphonieorchester des Hessischen Rundfunks, Frankfurt (Bartók, Eötvös); Ensemble Modern Frankfurt (Ligeti); Peter Eötvös (conductor) | Naïve, V 5285 | Double-CD |
| 2013 | Two Russian violin concertos: Stravinsky: Concerto in re; Prokofjev: Violin concerto Nr. 2 | London Philharmonic Orchestra; Vladimir Jurowski (conductor) | Naïve, V 5352 | CD |
| 2014 | Quasi Parlando: Tigran Mansurian: Concertos for violin/cello and strings | Amsterdam Sinfonietta; Candida Thompson (Leader); Anja Lechner (Cello) | ECM New Series 2323 | CD |
| 2014 | Galina Ustvolskaya: Violin sonata, Duet, Clarinet Trio | Patricia Kopatchinskaja (violin); Markus Hinterhäuser (piano); Reto Bieri (Clarinet) | ECM New Series 2329 | CD |
| 2015 | Giya Kancheli: Chiaroscuro, Twilight | Gidon Kremer (violin); Patricia Kopatchinskaja (violin); Kremerata Baltica | ECM New Series 2442 | CD |
| 2015 | Take Two Duets from 1000 years of musical history Works by Gesualdo, De Machaut, Gibbons, Giamberti, Biber, Bach, De Falla, Milhaud, Vivier, Martinu, Cage, Holliger, Sotelo, Dick, Sanchez-Chiong and from Winchester Troper | Patricia Kopatchinskaja (violin, baroque violin, voice); Reto Bieri (clarinet, violin, ocarina); Laurence Dreyfus (treble viol); Pablo Marquez (guitar); Anthony Romaniuk (harpsichord, toy piano); Jorge Sanchez-Chiong (turntables and electronics); Matthias Würsch (darbuka); Ernesto Estrella (voice) | Alpha Classics | CD |
| 2016 | Pjotr Iljitsch Tschaikowski: Violin concerto; Les Noces | Patricia Kopatchinskaja (violin); MusicAeterna; Teodor Currentzis, conductor | Sony classical | CD |
| 2016 | Robert Schumann Complete symphonic works Vol.4: Violin concerto; Piano concerto | Patricia Kopatchinskaja (violin); Denes Varjon (piano); WDR-Symphony-Orchestra, Cologne; Heinz Holliger, conductor | Audite | CD |
| 2016 | Faradj Karaev: Violin concerto; Vingt ans après "Nostalgie..." (Symphony) | Patricia Kopatchinskaja (Violin); Azerbaijan Symphony Orchestra Baku; Rauf Abullayev, conductor | Paladino Music | CD |
| 2016 | Robert Schumann Complete symphonic works Vol.5: Concert pieces for piano and orchestra op. 92 und 134; Fantasy for Violin and Orchestra op.131; Concert piece for four horns and orchestra op. 86 | Patricia Kopatchinskaja (Violin); Alexander Lonquich (Piano); WDR-Symphony-Orchestra, Cologne; Heinz Holliger, conductor | Audite | CD |
| 2016 | Franz Schubert Death and the Maiden and also other works by Gesualdo, Dowland, Nörmiger, Kurtag etc. | Patricia Kopatchinskaja (violin, direction); Saint Paul Chamber Orchestra, Saint Paul, Minnesota | Alpha classics | CD |
| 2018 | Francis Poulenc: Violin sonata; Leo Delibes: Waltz from Coppélia for piano solo; Béla Bartók: Violin sonata Nr.2; Maurice Ravel: Tzigane | Patricia Kopatchinskaja (Violin); Polina Leschenko (Piano) | Alpha Classics | CD |
| 2018 | Michael Hersch End Stages, Violin Concerto: Violin Concerto (2015); End Stages for Orchestra | Orpheus Chamber Orchestra (End Stages); ICE – International contemporary Ensemble, New York (violin concerto); Tito Munoz, Dirigent (violin concerto); Patricia Kopatchinskaja (violin) | New Focus Recordings fcr 208 | CD |
| 2019 | Time and Eternity: John Zorn: Kol Nidre; Karl Amadeus Hartmann: Concerto funebre; Frank Martin: Polyptyque; Lubos Fiser: Crux; Johann Sebastian Bach: Choral transcriptions for strings | Camerata Bern; Patricia Kopatchinskaja (concept, direction, solo violin) | Alpha Classics alpha545 | CD |
| 2020 | "WHATS NEXT VIVALDI?": Antonio Vivaldi: Concertos RV 157, 191, 208, 253, 550; Aurelio Cattaneo: Estroso; Luca Francesconi: Spiccato Il Volo; Simone Movio: Incanto XIX; Marco Stroppa: Dilanio Avvinto; Giovanni Sollima: Moghul; Bela Bartok: The Bagpipe | Il Giardino Armonico; Giovanni Antonini (cond., recorder); Patricia Kopatchinskaja (solo violin) | Alpha Classics alpha624 | CD |
| 2020 | "PLAISIRS ILLUMINÉS": Sandor Veress: Musica concertante for 12 strings; György Kurtag: Trio Jelek VI aus Games, Signs and Messages; Alberto Ginastera: Concerto for strings op. 33; Bela Bartok: Duo "Pizzicato"; György Ligeti: Duo "Balada si joc"; Francisco Coll Garcia: "Plaisirs illuminés", double concerto for violin, violoncello and orchestra; Improvisation: Camerata's Birds | Camerata Bern; Patricia Kopatchinskaja (direction, solo violin); Sol Gabetta, violoncello; Francisco Coll Garcia, cond. (double concerto) | Alpha Classics alpha580 | CD |
| 2021 | "PIERROT LUNAIRE": Arnold Schoenberg: Pierrot lunaire, op.21; Johann Strauss: Kaiserwalzer op. 437 (arr. Schoenberg); Arnold Schoenberg: Phantasy for violin and piano op.47; Anton Webern: Four Pieces for Violin and Piano op.7; Fritz Kreisler: Miniature Viennese March; Arnold Schoenberg: Six little piano pieces op.19 | Patricia Kopatchinskaja (voice, violin); Joonas Ahonen, piano; Reto Bieri, clarinet, bass clarinet; Julia Gallego, flute; Meesun Hong Coleman, violin, viola; Thomas Kaufmann, violoncello | Alpha Classics alpha722 | CD |
| 2021 | "PORTRAIT FRANCISCO COLL": Francisco Coll: Concerto for violin and orchestra (2019); Francisco Coll: Hidd'n Blue, Op. 6 for orchestra (2009-2011); Francisco Coll: Mural for large orchestra (2013-2015); Francisco Coll: Four Iberian Miniatures for violin and chamber orchestra (2014); Francisco Coll: Aqua Cinerea for large orchestra (2005) | Luxembourg Philharmonic Orchestra; Gustavo Gimeno (dir); Patricia Kopatchinskaja (violin) | Pentatone PTC 5186951 | CD |
| 2021 | "SOL & PAT": Jean-Marie Leclair: Tambourin In C Major; Jörg Widmann: From the Duos for Violin and Cello; Carl Philipp Emanuel Bach: Presto, Helm 66 VI; Francisco Coll: Rizoma; Maurice Ravel: Sonata in A Minor for Violin and Cello, M.73; Marcin Markowicz: Interlude; Julien-Francois Zbinden: La Fête au Village, Op.9; Iannis Xenakis: Dhipli Zyia; Gyôrgy Ligeti: Hommage à Hilding Rosenberg; Zoltan Kodâly: Duo for Violin and Cello in D Minor, Op.7; Johann Sebastian Bach: Prelude No.15 in G Major, BWV 860 | Sol Gabetta (cello); Patricia Kopatchinskaja (violin) | Alpha Classics alpha 757 | CD |
| 2022 | "LE MONDE SELON GEORGE ANTHEIL": Works by Morton Feldman, Ludwig van Beethoven, John Cage, and George Antheil | with Joonas Ahonen (piano) | Alpha Classics | CD |
| 2023 | "JANACEK - BRAHMS - BARTOK": Works by Leos Janácek, Johannes Brahms and Béla Bartók | with Fazil Say (piano); | Alpha Classics | CD |
| 2023 | "Maria Mater Meretrix": Works by Walther von der Vogelweide, Lili Boulanger, Hildegard von Bingen, Joseph Haydn, Hanns Eisler, Bertolt Brecht, et al. | with Camerata Bern and Anna Prohaska (soprano); | Alpha Classics | CD |
| 2024 | "TAKE 3": Works by Francis Poulenc, Paul Schonfield, Béla Bartók, and Serban Nichifor | with Reto Bieri (clarinet) and Polina Leschenko (piano) | Alpha Classics | CD |
| 2025 | "EXILE": Works by Ysaye, Schnittke, Panufnik, et al. | with Camerata Bern and Thomas Kaufmann (Cello) | Alpha Classics | CD |
| 2025 | "Kirill Petrenko conducts Schönberg": Arnold Schoenberg: Violin concerto and complete orchestral works | Berliner Philharmoniker, Patricia Kopatchinskaja et al. | Berlin Phil Edition | 3 CD's und Blueray |
| 2026 | "MARTON ILLES: Bowed spaces": Works by Marton Illes (born 1975) | with Michael Altstaedt, Münchner Kammerorchester (cond. Clemens Schuldt) in collaboration with SWR-Experimentalstudio | Alpha Classics | CD |
| 2026 | PATKOP & SAY | Recital with Pianist Fazil Say Works by Sergei Prokofiev, Karol Szymanowski, Fazıl Say, Patricia Kopatchinskaja | Alpha Classics | CD |
