= Kurt Pahlen =

Austrian musicologist and composer (1907–2003)

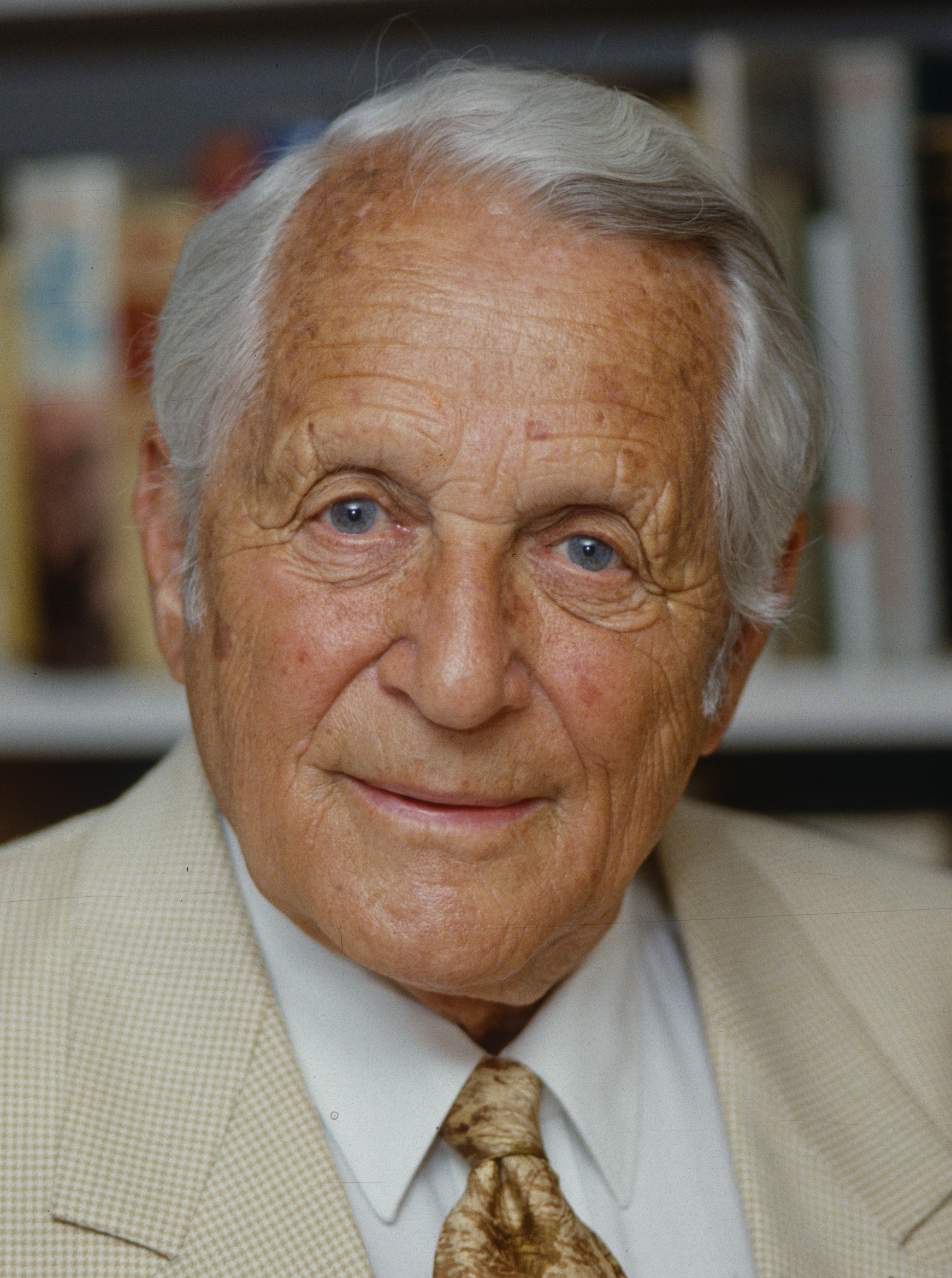
Kurt Pahlen (1992)

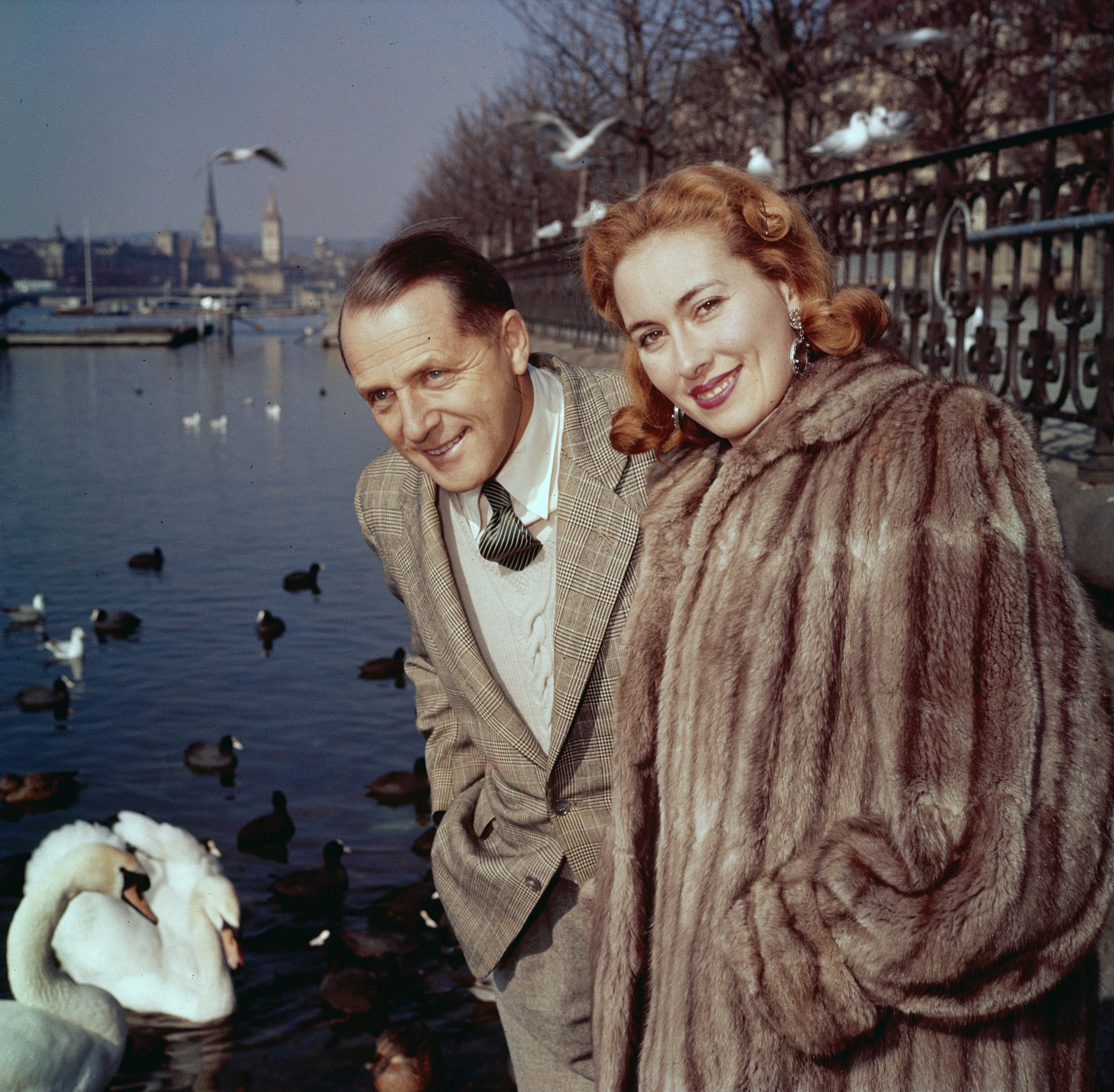
Kurt Pahlen and Myrtha Garbarini (1958)

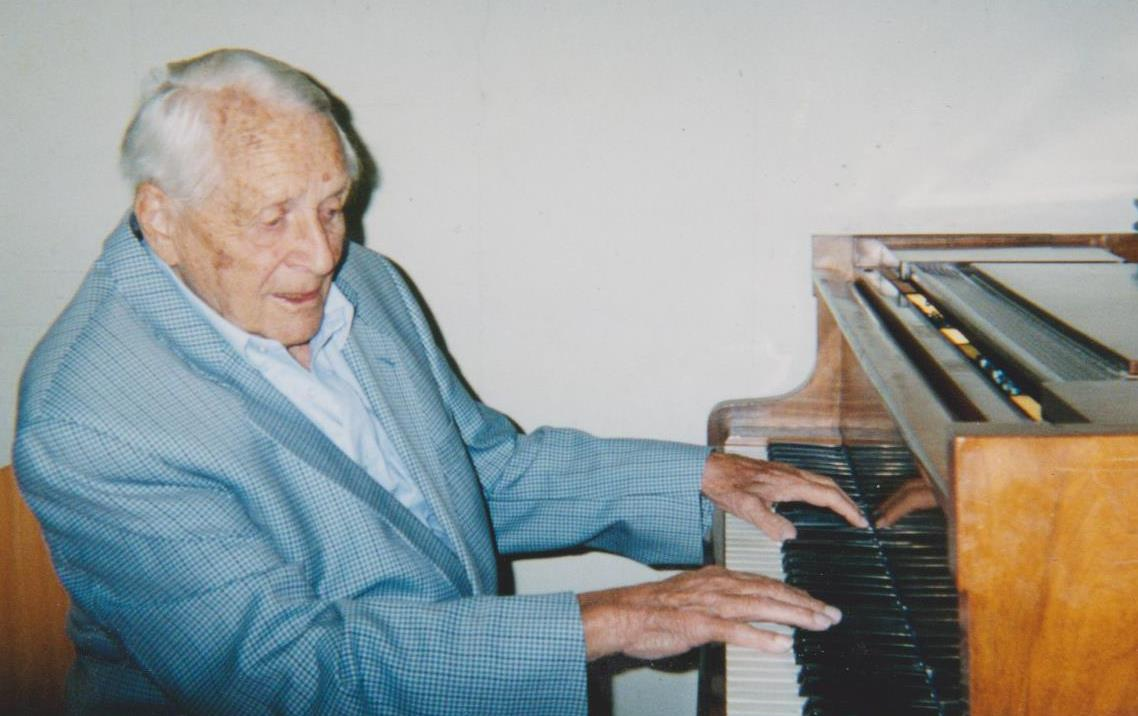
Kurt Pahlen (2002)

Kurt Pahlen (May 26, 1907 – July 24, 2003) was an Austrian conductor and musicologist.

== Life ==
Pahlen was born in Vienna, in 1907. At the age of seven, he lost his father, the song accompanist Richard Pahlen. His mother got married for the second time to the banker Paul Raumann and moved to Berlin-Schmargendorf with him and his son. Kurt Pahlen studied musicology and German studies in his hometown. In addition, he completed an apprenticeship as Kapellmeister at the Vienna Music Academy. In 1929 he received his doctorate.

After his first successes as Kapellmeister of the Vienna Volksoper and being appreciated by the Revolutionary Socialists of Austria as choirmaster, he directed the music events of the Volkshochschule Ottakring. He was a conductor at Radio Wien and the Vienna Symphony and founded an opera studio at Ludo-Hartmann-Platz in the working-class district of Ottakring. Although, according to his own statement he was not personally threatened by Nazism, Pahlen did not return in 1938 from a stay in Zürich and emigrated in 1939 to Argentina. In Buenos Aires he became the music director and head of the Filarmónica Metropolitana, in which also played with the Austrian emigrant Estéban Eitler. Pahlen then became a professor at the Universidad de la República in Montevideo and was the founder and holder of the Department of Music History. For many years he was director of Teatro Colón in Buenos Aires; also taught at the Pestalozzi School Buenos Aires. In those years he befriended Manuel de Falla, Paul Hindemith, and also from Vienna, Erich Wolfgang Korngold.

After the end of the Third Reich, Pahlen conducted in the Vienna State Opera, the Zurich Opera, Theater Basel, Bern Theatre, Badisches Staatstheater Karlsruhe and other houses. He has performed with the NDR Symphony Orchestra, the Orchestre de la Suisse Romande, the Mozarteum Orchestra Salzburg and other orchestras. In the early 1970s, Pahlen returned to Switzerland and settled in Männedorf. He was professor at the Internationales Opernstudio of the Zürich Opera House. He taught masterclasses and was president of the Forum for Music and Movement in Lenk. He was visiting scholar at the University of Buenos Aires, National University of La Plata, Federal University of Rio de Janeiro, National Autonomous University of Mexico, Benemérita Universidad Autónoma de Puebla, University of Monterrey, Universidad Veracruzana and others.

During the Musiktage organized by him for children in Lenk, he died as a result of a fall.

== Honors ==
- 1973: Austrian Cross of Honor for Science and Art First Class
- 1981: Grand Cross of Merit
- 1994: Honorary doctorate of the Universidad de Buenos Aires
- 2001: Grand Golden Medal of Merit for Services to the Republic of Austria
- Golden Medal of Honor of the City of Vienna]
- Honorary Cup of the province of Salzburg
- Honorary Citizenship of Heroica Puebla de Zaragoza, Mexico

== Publications ==
Since 1944, Pahlen wrote over 40 books, some of which were translated into 16 languages. His radio and television programs as well as his introductory lectures at the Salzburg Easter Festival, Verona Opera Festival, Munich Opera Festival, Vienna Festival, and Bregenz Festival made him known to a large audience. Not only opera-goers, but also musicians, singers and conductors appreciate the guide he has published in the series "Operas of the World" on famous works of music theater.

- Musikgeschichte der Welt. Zürich 1947
- Manuel de Falla und die Musik in Spanien. Walter, Olten 1953
- Musiklexikon der Welt. Zürich 1956
- Tschaikovsky. Ein Lebensbild. Stuttgart 1959
- Musik. Eine Einführung. Zürich 1965
- Sinfonie der Welt. 1967
- Mensch und Musik. 1974
- Oratorien der Welt. 1985
- Die großen Epochen der abendländischen Musik. 1991
- Das Buch der Volkslieder. 176 Volkslieder aus acht Jahrhunderten. 1998
- Die große Geschichte der Musik. 2002 (revised edition of Die großen Epochen...)
- Reihe Opern der Welt – die großen Werke der Opernliteratur (a volume to a well-known work of music theater with textbook, introduction and commentary)
- Ja, die Zeit ändert viel. Mein Jahrhundert mit der Musik (Autobiography). München 2001, ISBN 3-421-05462-2

== Bibliography ==
- Ingrid Bigler-Marschall:Andreas Kotte, ed. (2005). "Kurt Pahlen". Theaterlexikon der Schweiz / Dictionnaire du théâtre en Suisse / Dizionario Teatrale Svizzero / Lexicon da teater svizzer [Theater Dictionary of Switzerland]. Vol. 2. Zürich: Chronos. pp. 1365–1366. ISBN 978-3-0340-0715-3. LCCN 2007423414. OCLC 62309181.Andreas KotteAndreas Kotte, ed. (2005). "Kurt Pahlen". Theaterlexikon der Schweiz / Dictionnaire du théâtre en Suisse / Dizionario Teatrale Svizzero / Lexicon da teater svizzer [Theater Dictionary of Switzerland]. Vol. 2. Zürich: Chronos. pp. 1365–1366. ISBN 978-3-0340-0715-3. LCCN 2007423414. OCLC 62309181.
- An die Freude: das Leben von Gluck, Haydn, Mozart, Beethoven, Schubert, told by Kurt Pahlen. In collaboration with Rosemarie König, Diogenes, Zürich 2005, ISBN 978-3-257-23526-5.
