= Michael Hersch =

American composer and pianist

- Born: Michael Nathaniel Hersch; June 25, 1971; Reston, Virginia, U.S.
- Genres: 21st-century classical music
- Instrument: Piano
- Website: michaelhersch.com

Michael Nathaniel Hersch (born June 25, 1971) is an American composer and pianist. He currently serves as faculty at the Johns Hopkins Peabody Conservatory in Baltimore, Maryland, where he completed his own studies in music composition. The New York Times has commented that he writes "extraordinarily communicative music" and that "Mr. Hersch's music speaks for itself eloquently".

== Biography ==
=== Early life and musical education ===
Born in Washington, D.C., and raised in Reston, Virginia, Hersch was introduced to classical music at the age of 18 by his younger brother Jamie, who showed him a videotape of Georg Solti conducting Beethoven's Fifth Symphony.

He began his studies at the Peabody Conservatory of Music in Baltimore with Morris Cotel. In 1995 Hersch studied at the Moscow Conservatory, where he worked with Albert Leman and Roman Ledenev. That same year he also worked with John Corigliano, John Harbison, and George Rochberg at a program for young composers. Hersch then returned to Peabody for graduate studies, graduating in 1997 with a Master of Arts. He returned to Peabody in 2006, where he currently teaches composition. Until 2019, he was the chair of the composition department.

=== Early recognition ===
His first success came when Marin Alsop selected Hersch's Elegy as winner of the American Composers Prize, and conducted it at Lincoln Center in New York in 1997. That year also saw Hersch awarded a Guggenheim Fellowship in Music Composition. He has also been a fellow at the Tanglewood Music Center, where he studied under Christopher Rouse, the Norfolk Festival for Contemporary Music, and the Pacific Music Festival in Sapporo, Japan. In 2000, Hersch was awarded the Rome Prize, in 2001 the Berlin Prize. While in Europe Hersch worked with Hans Werner Henze and Luciano Berio. Other honors include the Charles Ives Scholarship (1996) and the Goddard Lieberson Fellowship (2006) from the American Academy of Arts & Letters.

Hersch's earliest recordings appeared on the Vanguard Classics label, the first released in 2003, with performances by the composer and the String Soloists of the Berlin Philharmonic. This was followed by two other Vanguard discs. The second, with Hersch performing his own work in addition to music of Morton Feldman, Wolfgang Rihm, and Josquin des Prez, was selected by The Washington Post and Newsday as among the notable recordings of 2004-05. In 2007, Hersch's multi-hour piano cycle, The Vanishing Pavilions (2005), with the composer at the keyboard was released. David Patrick Stearns of The Philadelphia Inquirer wrote on the October 14, 2006 premiere of the work given by the composer.

=== Music ===
Described by The New York Times as "viscerally gripping and emotionally transformative music … claustrophobic and exhilarating at once, with moments of sublime beauty nestled inside thickets of dark virtuosity", Hersch's work "marries a volcanic New World energy to a deeply skeptical, often angst-ridden spiritual climate." (Andrew Clark, Financial Times)

In 2014, Hersch's first work for the stage, On the Threshold of Winter (2012), premiered at the Brooklyn Academy of Music's Fishman Space by the NUNC ensemble (Miranda Cuckson, director) with Ah Young Hong as the soloist. The opera, about terminal illness, is a reaction to the passing of one of Hersch's closest friends in 2009, as well as the composer's own diagnosis of cancer several years earlier. Its text comes from the deathbed poems of Romanian writer Marin Sorescu.

Hersch has written a number of pieces premiered by Hong, including his one-act opera POPPEA (2019) created alongside librettist Stephanie Fleischmann, which premiered in at the Festival ZeitRäume Basel and the Wien Modern Festival in 2021. The opera is a continuation of the story of the Roman Empress Poppea, picking up where Claudio Monteverdi's L'incornazione di Poppea ended.

In recent years, a frequent collaborator has been violinist Patricia Kopatchinskaja. The violinist has commissioned several works from Hersch, including his Violin Concerto, which she premiered with the Saint Paul Chamber Orchestra in 2015. It was recently announced that he will be writing a new work for her in 2018-19 to be premiered with Camerata Bern.

Other collaborations include those with Dutch contemporary music group Ensemble Klang, violinist Miranda Cuckson, and the Orpheus Chamber Orchestra.

Hersch's more recent music has been characterized as increasingly "spare, intense, fiercely inward-turning."

=== Piano performance ===
A highly regarded pianist, Hersch has performed throughout the U.S. and internationally. Though he appears in public infrequently, he commands a wide repertoire from Josquin to Boulez. Since 2000, he has primarily focused on performances of his own music.

== Selected works ==
Orchestral

- Elegy for string orchestra (1993)
- Symphony No. 1 (1998); commissioned and performed as part of the Dallas Symphony Orchestra's centennial season, Alan Gilbert conducting
- Ashes of Memory (1999); premiered by the Pittsburgh Symphony Orchestra, Mariss Jansons conducting
- Symphony No. 2 (2001); commission by the Pittsburgh Symphony and Mariss Jansons
- Fracta (2002); commission by the Pittsburgh Symphony
- Variations on a Theme of Hugo Wolf for chamber orchestra (or full orchestra) (2004)
- Arraché (2004); commission by the Baltimore Symphony Orchestra
- Symphony No. 3 (2009); commission by the Cabrillo Festival of Contemporary Music
- end stages (2016)

Concertante

- Piano Concerto (2002); premiered by Garrick Ohlsson and a co-commission of the Pittsburgh, St. Louis, and Oregon symphonies
- Night Pieces for trumpet and orchestra (2010)
- along the ravines for piano and orchestra (2010)
- a sheltered corner for horn and orchestra (2011)
- Black Untitled for trombone and ensemble (2013)
- Violin Concerto (2015)

Opera

- On the Threshold of Winter (2012)
- POPPEA (2019)

Chamber

- Trio for violin, clarinet and piano (1995)
- Two Pieces for cello and piano (2000)
- Octet for Strings for 4 violins, 2 violas and 2 cellos (2001); commission by Boris Pergamenschikow and the Kronberg Academy, premiered at the Schloss Neuhardenberg Festival in Berlin
- the wreckage of flowers: twenty-one pieces after poetry and prose of Czesław Miłosz, Sonata for violin and piano (2003); commission by Midori
- Variations on a Poem for piano, violin and cello (2003); commission by Sequenza
- Last Autumn for horn and cello (2008)
- Images from a Closed Ward for string quartet (2010), commissioned and then recorded by the Blair Quartet (2014) a revised version was recorded the FLUX Quartet (2018)
- Zwischen Leben und Tod: twenty-two pieces after images by Peter Weiss for violin and piano (2013)
- Carrion-Miles to Purgatory: thirteen pieces after texts of Robert Lowell for violin and cello (2015); commission by Hans Kindler Foundation Trust Fund in the Library of Congress

Solo instrumental

- Sonata No.1 for unaccompanied cello (1994)
- Sonata No. 2 for unaccompanied cello (2000); written for American cellist Daniel Gaisford
- Recordatio for piano (2003)
- Milosz Fragments for violin (2004)
- Five Fragments for violin (2004)
- The Vanishing Pavilions for piano (2005); work after poetry of Christopher Middleton
- Caelum Dedecoratum for double bass (2006); originally written for cello, then withdrawn, then adapted for double bass for bassist Jeffrey Weisner
- Fourteen Pieces for violin (2007)
- Tenebrae for piano (2010)
- in the snowy margins for violin (2010)
- Two Lullabies for piano (2011)
- of ages manifest for alto saxophone (2012)
- November Portrait for unaccompanied banjo (2012)
- Of Sorrow Born: Seven Elegies for violin (2014)
- the weather and landscape are on our side for violin (2015)

Vocal

- Two Songs for soprano and piano (1993)
- Domicilium: a song cycle after poems of Thomas Hardy for baritone and piano (2010)
- How Far the Cradle for soprano and piano (2012)
- a breath upwards for soprano, clarinet, horn, and viola (2014)
- a tower in air for soprano and horn (2015)
- cortex and ankle for soprano and ensemble (2016)
- I hope we get a chance to visit soon for two sopranos and ensemble (2018)
- anonymous beneath the lemon trees for soprano and ensemble (2020)
- one step to the next, worlds ending (2022)

Choral

- From Ecclesiastes for unaccompanied mixed chorus (1997)

== Audio recording ==
the wreckage of flowers - Works for Violin

- Label: Vanguard Classics (MC-105)
- Miranda Cuckson, violin; Blair McMillen, piano
- Release Date: 2010
- includes Five Fragments, Fourteen Pieces after texts of Primo Levi, and the wreckage of flowers: 21 pieces after poetry and prose of Czeslaw Milosz

Sonatas Nos. 1 & 2 for Unaccompanied Cello

- Label: Vanguard Classics (MCS-CD-104)
- Daniel Gaisford, cello
- Release Date: 2009
- Review: by Vivien Schweitzer in The New York Times

The Vanishing Pavilions

- Label: Vanguard Classics / Musical Concepts (MC-101) [2-CD Box Set]
- Michael Hersch, piano
- Release Date: 2007
- Review: by Steve Hicken in sequenza21

Chamber Music

- Label: Vanguard Classics (ATM-CD-1240)
- String Soloists of the Berlin Philharmonic; Michael Hersch, piano
- Release Date: 2003
- Review: by Andrew Druckenbrod in the Pittsburgh Post-Gazette

Hersch – Josquin – Rihm – Feldman

- Label: Vanguard Classics (ATM-CD-1558)
- Michael Hersch, piano; Daniel Gaisford, cello
- Release Date: 2004
- Review: by Tim Page in The Washington Post

Orchestral Works

- Label: Naxos 8.559281
- Marin Alsop/Bournemouth Symphony Orchestra
- Release Date: 2006
- Review: by Andrew Clark in Financial Times
