= Amelia Sierra =

Mexican singer

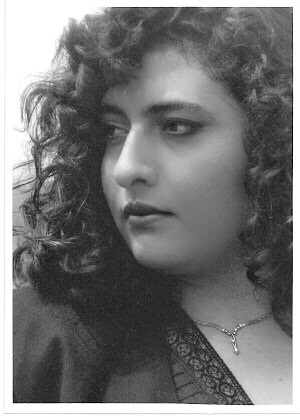
Mezzo-soprano Amelia Sierra

Amelia Sierra is a soprano and mezzo-soprano opera singer from Mexico.

== Life and career ==
Sierra was born in Mexico City and completed her musical studies with the Escuela Superior de Música of the INBA. She has studied under Maritza Alemán, James Demster, Mario Alberto Hernández and Ricardo Sánchez as well as Magda Olivero, Montserrat Caballé, Ramón Vargas, Francisco Araiza, Carmo Barbosa, Dalton Baldwin, Dolores Aldea, Lara Pasquinelli, Joan Dornemann, Tito Capobianco and Susan Young . While in training, she received recognition with Best Performance at the FONCA-OCJM in 1995, third place in the Carlo Morelli National Singing Contest and first place the OSUG Competition, both in 1996. She also received recognition by the National Coordination of Music and Opera in 1996. She has received various grants for performing from the Education for Art Program at the University of Guanajuato and SIVAM. She continues to study informally in various workshops in New York City.

She has performed a number of classic roles as well as sung in new works which premiered in Mexico. She debuted as a soloist in 1996 with the Carlos Chávez Symphonic Orchestra. She debuted with the Bellas Artes Opera in 2002 as Santuzza in Cavalleria rusticana by Mascagni and appeared again in 2004 in Il prigioniero by Dallapiccola and as Elvira in the world premier of the work Ambrosio by Mexican composer José Antonio Guzmán. In 2007, she sang the role of Madame Lidoine in Dialogues des Carmelites by Poulenc, the first time in fifty years the play was performed in Mexico. Some of her other opera appearances include Un ballo in Maschera, Il Trovatore, Simon Boccanegra and Macbeth by Verdi; Don Giovanni, Così fan tutte and Le Nozze di Figaro by Mozart; Iphigénie en Tauride by Glück, Il barbiere di Siviglia by Rossini, I pagliacci by Leoncavallo, as well as Suor Angelica, La bohème, Tosca and Turandot by Puccini. She participated in a tour of opera for children, sponsored by CONACULTA . In addition to performing in operatic theater, she also performs Baroque music as well as traditional Mexican and Spanish music at festivals and in radio programs, especially with pianist Carlos Pecero. She has performed at a number of festivals in Mexico, such as the Festival Internacional Cervantino in Guanajuato and the Festival Ortiz Tirado in Sonora . She has also performed at the Festival AMUBIS in Cartago, Costa Rica and at the University of Toronto . She has performed with a number of national orchestras, such as Orquesta de Cámara de la Universidad Michoacana and OFUNAM .

Since 1997, Sierra has two to major teaching positions. The first was at the Singing Academy of the Escuela Superior de Música of INBA. She currently teaches at the Celaya Music Conservatory. She has also promoted the establishment of an opera company OPTA (Opera for Tampico) in Tampico, Tamaulipas . Since 1998, Sierra has received four grants for study and performance from the Fondo Nacional para la Cultura y las Artes. Her most recent was to train to sing as a mezzo-soprano with her first appearance as such in Il Trovatore by Verdi, which was performed in Monterrey in 2011.(homepage)
