= Johanna Doderer =

Austrian composer (born 1969)

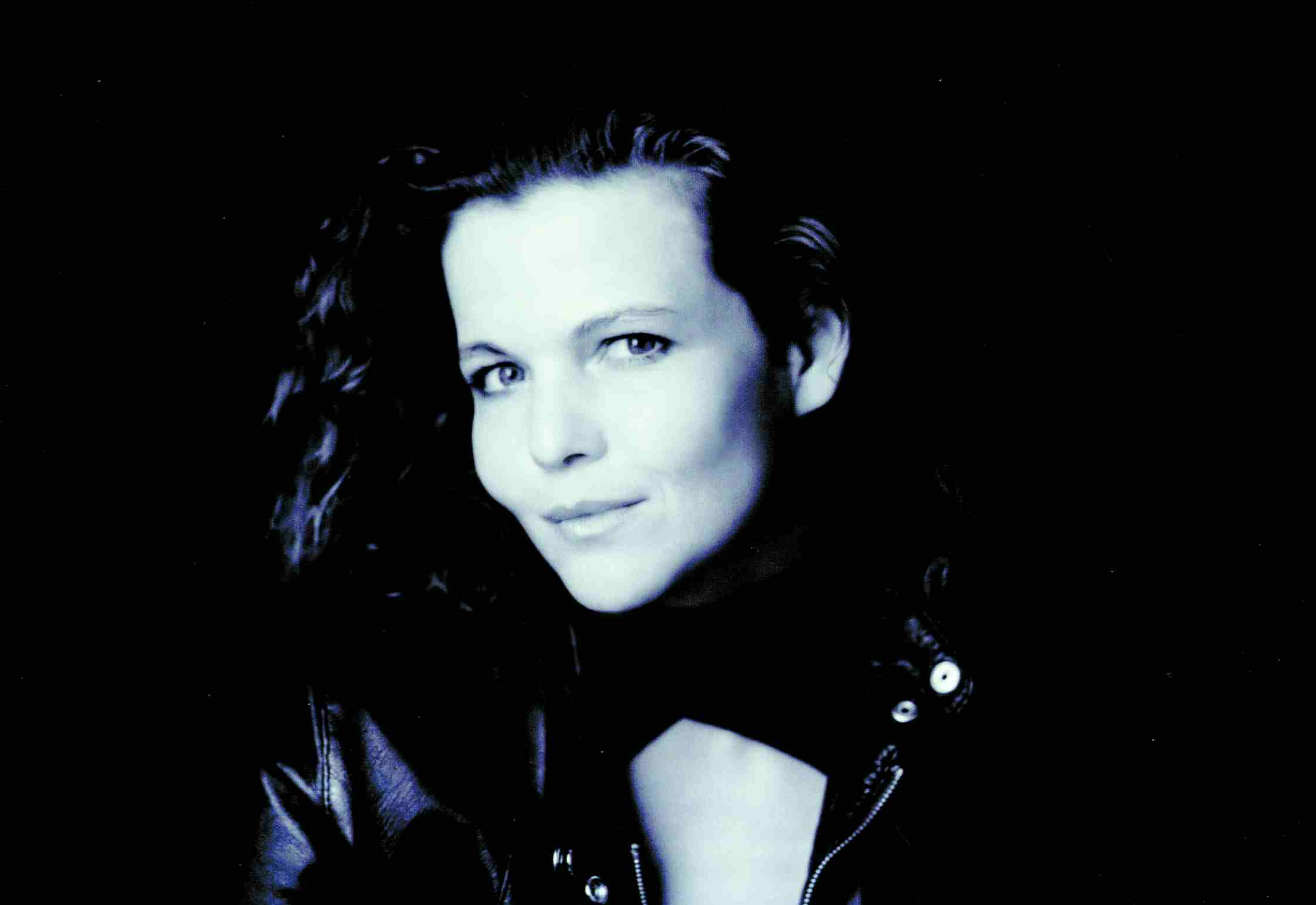
Johanna Doderer

Johanna Doderer (born 18 September 1969 in Bregenz) is an Austrian composer.

== Biography ==
Doderer was born in 1969 in Bregenz, Austria. She is the great-niece of the Austrian novelist Heimito von Doderer and a great-granddaughter of the architect Carl Wilhelm von Doderer. Doderer learned her trade in Graz with Beat Furrer (composition), then later in Vienna with Klaus Peter Sattler (film and media composition) and Erich Urbanner (composition). Her current work ranges broadly from chamber music to orchestral work and to opera. In the immediate future she intends to concentrate her work in the field of opera.

An important aspect of her artistic career is her frequent collaborations with musicians such as Patricia Kopatchinskaja, Sylvia Khittl-Muhr, Marlis Petersen and Edua Zadory, and with the conductor Ulf Schirmer.

Her work was performed at the Embassy of Austria, Washington, D.C. by violinist Édua Zádory and the Momenta Quartet. In December 2012 the University of Arts Graz (Austria) devoted an entire day to performances of Johanna Doderer's works.

=== Prizes and residencies ===
- Composer in Residence 2004/2005, Wiener Concertverein
- SKE Publicity Preis 2004
- Österreichisches Staatsstipendium für Komponistinnen und Komponisten 2002
- Kulturpreis der Stadt Feldkirch 2002
- Kulturpreis der Stadt Wien (Sparte Musik) 2002
- Wiener Symphoniker-Stipendium 2001

=== Commissions ===
She has received commissions from organisations including: Münchner Rundfunkorchester, Wiener Symphoniker, Royal Liverpool Philharmonic (Ensemble 10/10), Brucknerorchester, Haydn-Trio Eisenstadt, Wiener Concerverein, Klangspuren in Schwaz, Bregenzer Festspiele, Festival Montepulciano, ADEvantgarde, Camerata Academica Salzburg, Klangforum Wien, Die Reihe, Pierrot Lunaire Ensemble, Ensemble Europeo Antidogma Musica Torino, Sounding London, Savaria Symphonieorchester Szombathely, Festival Internazionale di Musica Antica e Contemporanea Torino, Festival Nuovi Spazi Musicali Roma, Musikwerkstatt Wien, Ensemble Plus, Open Music Graz, Österreichisches Ensemble für Neue Musik Salzburg, and Ensemble Lux.

== Recordings ==
- ORF CD, Johanna Doderer with Ulf Schirmer, Patricia Kopatchinskaja, etc.
- For violin and orchestra, Bolero for two pianos and orchestra, Rondane for orchestra, ORF- Shop, order number: 2009336
- OEHMS Classics, “Mon cher cousin” with Ulf Schirmer, the Munich Radio Orchester, Salome Kammer, etc., CD made in connection with Augsburg's Mozart Celebration 2008, including Johanna Doderer's “Mon cher cousin” for soprano and orchestra, Oehms Classics OC 714
- CAPRICCIO, D2H-Dedicated To Haydn with Haydn Trio Eisenstadt (3 CDs)
- CDs made in connection with the opening of the Haydn Year in Eisenstadt in May 2009, including Johanna Doderer's 2nd piano trio (info: www.d2h.at), CAP7020

== List of works ==
=== Operas ===
- Die Fremde (2000/01; DWV 28). Opera in 1 act. Libretto: Johanna Doderer (after Euripides’ drama Medea). Duration: 70'.
- Strom (2002–06; DWV 29). Opera in 1 act. Libretto: Johanna Doderer (after Euripides’ drama The Bacchae). Duration: 110 min.
- Falsch verbunden (2006; DWV 43). Short opera. Libretto: Daniel Glattauer. Duration: 15 min.
- Der leuchtende Fluss (title in English: A Kind Of Yellow) (2009–2010, DWV 45). Libretto: Wolfgang Hermann. Duration: 150 min
- Fatima, (2015) Opera for children. From a story by Rafik Schami
- Liliom (2016) Opera. Libretto: Josef Ernst Köpplinger (based on the 1909 play Liliom by Ferenc Molnár).
- Schubert's Reise nach Atzenbrugg (2021) Opera. Libretto: Peter Turrini.

=== Orchestral works ===
- Second Symphony, "Bohinj" (49') (2014/15; DWV 93)
- Study on Zaha Hadid's Painting "Vison for Madrid" (1992) for orchestra (20') (2008; DWV55)
- DER GROSSE REGEN for orchestra (10') (2007; DWV50)
- First Symphony (40') (2006-7; DWV47)
- Rondane version for large orchestra (15') (2001; DWV26)
- Für Orchester orchestra study (6') (1999; DWV19)
- Ikarus for string orchestra (15') (1991; DWV9)
- Eine Sonnenfinsternis for string orchestra and timpani (20') (1993; DWV4)

=== Chamber orchestra ===
- Psalm 2 chamber orchestra version (12') (2006; DWV41)
- Rondane for chamber orchestra (10') (2000; DWV20)
- Skumring for instrumental ensemble (25') (1995; DWV10)

=== Concertos ===
- Violin Concerto No. 2, "In Breath of Time" (23') (2012; DWV62b)
- Violin Concerto (45') (2004/2005; DWV35)
- Bolero for 2 pianos and orchestra (30') (2004; DWV36 )
- For Orchestra or Violoncello Solo (10') (2000; DWV22)

=== Chamber music ===
- Second String Quintet (12') (2008; DWV56)
- Second Piano Trio (15') (2008; DWV52)
- For Accordion and Strings 1 (14') (2006; DWV45)
- Work for Cello and Piano (ca.15') (2005; DWV38)
- Psalm 2 for string quartet (12') (2005; DWV37)
- Piano Trio (15') (2002; DWV31)
- erwachen III for 3 violins (30') (2001; DWV27)
- silence I for violin and piano (15') (2001; DWV25)
- silence II for violin and cello (12') (2001; DWV24)
- running for percussion and piano (15') (2001; DWV23)
- Stimmen for instrumental ensemble (15') (1999 DWV18)
- erwachen II for 3 violins (10') (1998; DWV17)
- Feuerkreis for string quintet (16') (1997; DWV15)
- Psalm String Quartet (18') (1994; DWV7)
- Brennpunkt for strings and Javanese gongs (20') (1994; DWV6)
- erwachen I for 3 violins (8') (1993; DWV5)
- Fall 2 for instrumental ensemble (15') (1991; DWV2)
- Fall 1 for flute, violin and cello (4') (1991; DWV1)

=== Solo works ===
- Wutmarsch - Fantasy for Piano Solo (4') (2008; DWV51)
- For Solo Violin 2 (12') (2007; DWV48)
- For Solo Violin (5') (2005; DWV39)
- Phantasien über den Grenzwald for piano (8') (2004; DWV34)
- Toccata for organ (10') (2003; DWV32)

=== Early studies ===
- Ziel for violin and cello (2') (1991)
- Piece for Two Violins and Cello (4') (1991)
- Zwiespalt for Flute and Cello (2') (1991)

=== Songs and vocal music ===
==== Solo voice ====
- Mon cher cousin for soprano and orchestra (2007; DWV49)
- Astraios work für mezzo-soprano and chamber orchestra (2006; DWV 42)
- Orchestral songs on texts by Wolfgang Hermann for mezzo-soprano (2005; DWV 40)
- Mass for Wilhelm Doderer for 2 mezzo-sopranos and organ (12') (2002; DWV 30)
- Feuerkreis for soprano, mezzo-soprano and vocal ensemble on texts by Reinhard Kräuter (15') (1998; DWV 16)
- Terra for soprano and orchestra (23') (1997; DWV 14)
- Terra for soprano and instrumental ensemble (12') (1997; DWV 13)
- Rot for soprano, and string quartet on texts by Reinhard Kräuter (15') (1996; DWV 12)
- Klänge aus einer verlorenen Zeit for alto, choir, viola and glasses (10') (1994; DWV 8)
- Der Verfall, a passion on texts by Georg Trakl for soprano, choir and chamber orchestra (15') (1991; DWV 3)

==== Songs with piano ====
- Song Cycle (10 Songs) for soprano, baritone and piano on texts by Antonia Pozzi (2009; DWV58)
- Orchestral songs for mezzo-soprano on texts by Wolfgang Hermann (piano version) (2005; DWV 40a)
- Songs for baritone and piano on texts by Wolfgang Hermann (12') (2003; DWV 33)
- Für ein Obdach am Rand aller Sinne song for soprano and piano on a text by Christine Lavant (10'). (2000; DWV 21)

==== Choir ====
- Three Choral Studies (2006; DWV 46)
- Vergessene Erde for choir (1995; DWV11)
