= Blair School of Music =

Music school of Vanderbilt University

Vanderbilt University Blair School of Music
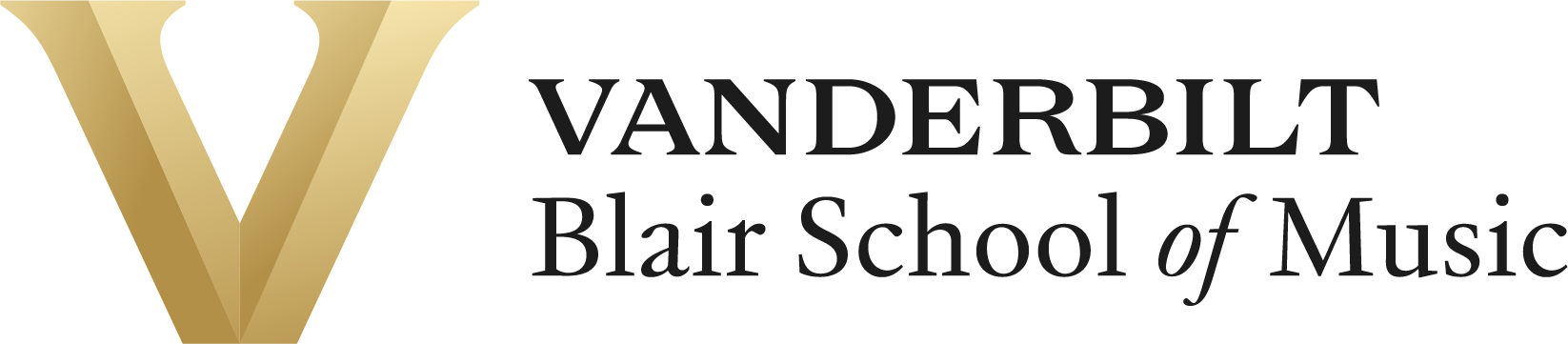
- Type: Private
- Established: 1964
- Dean: Melissa Rose
- Faculty: 75
- Undergraduates: 265
- Location: Nashville, TN, USA; 36.1386°N 86.8061°W

Blair School of Music, located in Nashville, Tennessee, provides a conservatory-caliber undergraduate education in music performance, composition, or integrated music studies (theory and history) within the context of a major research university, Vanderbilt University. Blair also provides music lessons, classes and ensembles to over 800 precollege and adult students each semester. Blair is the youngest and smallest of Vanderbilt's ten constituent schools and colleges.

== History ==
While established in 1964, Blair did not initially offer undergraduate-level courses, instead focusing on pre-college music education as part of the then-independent Peabody College (Peabody is itself now part of Vanderbilt). The school was initially housed in the mansion at 1208 18th Avenue South in Nashville, which now serves as Vanderbilt's English Language Center.

The Blair String Quartet was established in 1967 by founding members Stephen Clapp, Lee Kull, Sheldon Kurland, and David Vanderkooi, and would go on to be named finalist in the 1986 International Naumburg Competition.

Ground was broken for the Blakemore Avenue building in 1979, and its doors were officially opened in 1980. As a feature of its location in Nashville, Blair became the first National Association of Schools of Music accredited institution to offer academic credit for the study of banjo and fiddle.

Through the initiative of Chancellor Alexander Heard in 1981, Vanderbilt began offering undergraduate programs at Blair as part of a wider liberal arts curriculum. In 1986, Blair began awarding its own bachelor's degrees, and in the following year minors of music and music history would be developed for students in all Vanderbilt schools and colleges.

The Blair School of Music Conversation Series was established in 1995, bringing Chet Atkins as its first guest to Vanderbilt for interview style lectures with students.

In 2002, the Martha Rivers Ingram Center for the Performing Arts was opened as part of a building expansion of the Blakemore Avenue facilities. The same year, the Voice Department established the Mary Cortner Ragland Trust, dedicated to bringing artists of renown to campus for recitals and masterclasses. Participants have included Renee Fleming, Audra McDonald, Thomas Hampson, and Dawn Upshaw.

In 2012, the Blair School formalized a running partnership with the Berlin Philharmonic Woodwind Quintet for intensive chamber music study both at Vanderbilt's Nashville campus and the Vanderbilt Music Académie in Aix-en-Provence, France.

In 2019, Vanderbilt Chancellor Nicholas Zeppos announced a long-term partnership between the Blair School of Music and the National Museum of African American Music, as well as a pledge of foundational support by the university.

== Areas of study and degree programs ==
Blair School of Music confers the bachelor of music degree in music performance, in composition, in jazz studies, and in integrated studies. Also offered is a bachelor of musical arts degree that combines musical study with a second focus in another field. Unique among Vanderbilt's four undergraduate schools, Blair has no graduate students. However, in conjunction with Peabody College, Blair offers a five-year bachelor of music/master of education program in musical arts and teacher education, and in conjunction with the Owen Graduate School of Management, a five-year joint bachelor of musical arts degree/MBA program. Blair School of Music is set apart from other similar university music schools by offering degrees only to undergraduates, giving them the sole focus of the faculty. Blair School of Music offers programs of study in the following departments:

=== Academic areas ===
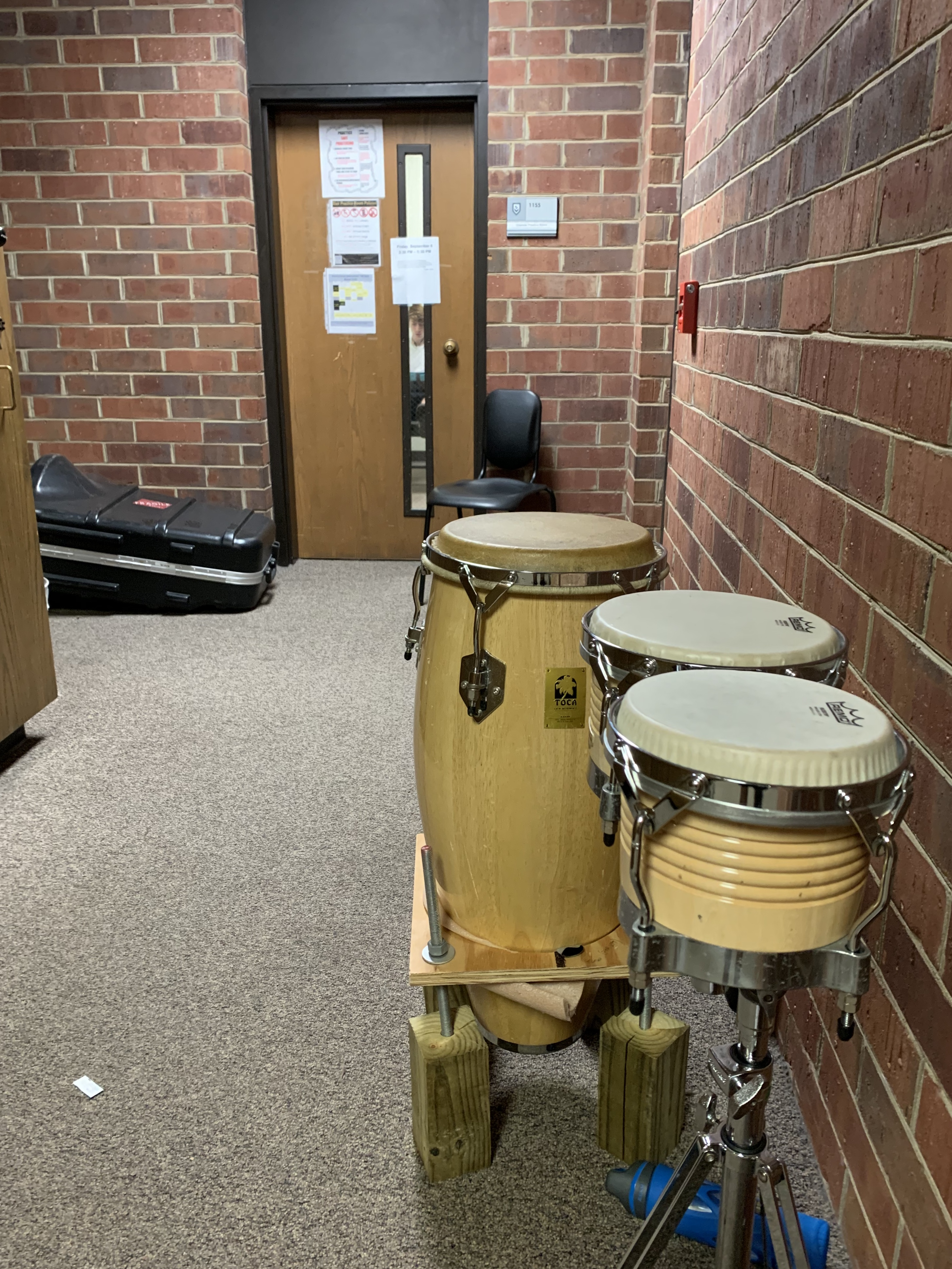
Three drums sitting in a practice room hallway of the Blair School of Music.

- Brass & Percussion
- Chamber Music
- Composition & Theory
- Folk
- Jazz
- Keyboard
- Musicology & Ethnomusicology
- Music Education
- Strings & Harp
- Voice
- Woodwinds

== Performing ensembles ==
Blair School of Music hosts a bevy of student performing ensembles both for Blair students as well as the wider Vanderbilt student community. The Vanderbilt Orchestra and Wind Symphony Program comprises three for-credit ensembles: the Vanderbilt University Orchestra, the Vanderbilt University Wind Symphony, and the Vanderbilt Opera/Oratorio Orchestra. Blair choirs include the Vanderbilt 16 (formerly Vanderbilt Chorale), the Vanderbilt University Singers, and the Blair Jazz Choir. The Vanderbilt Opera Theatre presents a fully staged production in the fall semester, as well as a staged art song theater piece in the spring under the auspices of the Lyric Theatre Workshop.

Other student performing ensembles hosted at Blair include more than two-dozen faculty-coached chamber ensembles, The Blair Big Band; Vanderbilt's African drum and dance ensemble, Sankofa; ensembles of the Vanderbilt Commodore Steel Band program; and the Vanderbilt Commodore Orchestra.

Faculty ensembles sponsored by the Blair School of Music include the Blair String Quartet, the Blakemore Trio, the Blair Brass Quintet and the Blair Woodwind Quintet.

== Facilities ==
Blair School of Music houses three main concert halls: The Martha Rivers Ingram Center for the Performing Arts, the Steve and Judy Turner Recital Hall, and the Cyrus Daniel Choral Hall. The School of Music has private studios for the faculty members, practice rooms with pianos for student use, and fully automated classrooms.

=== Performance venues ===
Martha Rivers Ingram Center for the Performing Arts

Completed in 2001, Ingram Hall is a 609-seat performance hall with full staging capability including orchestra pit, opera scene shop, loading dock, dressing rooms, and green rooms, rehearsal halls, conductors' and administration offices, and a NightPro audio recording studio.

Steve and Judy Turner Recital Hall

Inaugurated in 1980, the Steve and Judy Turner Recital Hall is a 272-seat recital hall utilized most frequently for faculty and student solo concertizing. The hall features Dobson's Opus 92 pipe organ, donated by Vanderbilt alumnus Cal Turner Jr., BA '62, and his sister Laura Dugas. The organ is modeled on German organs of the 18th century and operated by mechanical-action.

Cyrus Daniel Choral Hall

Constructed as part of the Blakemore Avenue building expansion in 2001, the Cyrus Daniel Choral Hall is an 80-seat venue equipped with interactive technology, optimized for recitals, masterclasses, rehearsals, workshops and large classes.

=== Anne Potter Wilson Music Library ===
The Anne Potter Wilson Music Library, located on the second floor of the Blair School of Music building, is a division of Vanderbilt's Jean and Alexander Heard Library system. The collection, begun in 1947, was moved from Peabody College's Social-Religious Building (now the Wyatt Center) to its new and permanent home at Blair in the summer of 1985. Named to honor Anne Potter Wilson by the Vanderbilt Board of Trust in 1987, the 8,000-square-foot (740 m^{2}) library holds 108,000+ books, scores, sound and video recordings, and subscriptions to more than 150 journals. It is equipped with a seminar room, listening, computing, and viewing stations, and study facilities. The library holds the Blair Performance Archive, an audio/visual database of Blair-produced performances and masterclasses from 1970 to the present day.

== BMI Composer-in-Residence Program ==
The BMI Composer-in-Residence program, which ran from 1992-2015 and was sponsored by Broadcast Music, Inc., brought two visiting composers to Vanderbilt's campus every year. Each composer's three- to seven-day residency included lectures, performances of the composer's works, and individual tutorship with Blair School composition majors. Previous BMI composers in-residence include Robert Beaser, William Bolcom, George Crumb, Richard Danielpour, Michael Daugherty, Mario Davidovsky, Lukas Foss, John Harbison, Karel Husa, Steven Mackey, Donald Martino, Cindy McTee, Bernard Rands, Christopher Rouse, Joseph Schwantner, Michael Torke, and Joan Tower.

== Faculty Awards ==
Pascal Le Boeuf, assistant professor of the practice in music technology, received a 2025 Grammy Award for Best Instrumental Composition ("Strands") and was also nominated in 2018 and 2023.

Dashon Burton, assistant professor of voice, is a three-time Grammy Award winner. He was awarded for Best Chamber Music/Small Ensemble Performance (Roomful of Teeth) in 2024, received a nomination for Best Chamber Music / Small Ensemble Performance in 2023, won for Best Classical Solo Vocal Album (Smyth: The Prison) in 2021, and in 2024 was awarded for Best Chamber Music / Small Ensemble Performance (Roomful of Teeth).
