= Ulf Schirmer =

German conductor

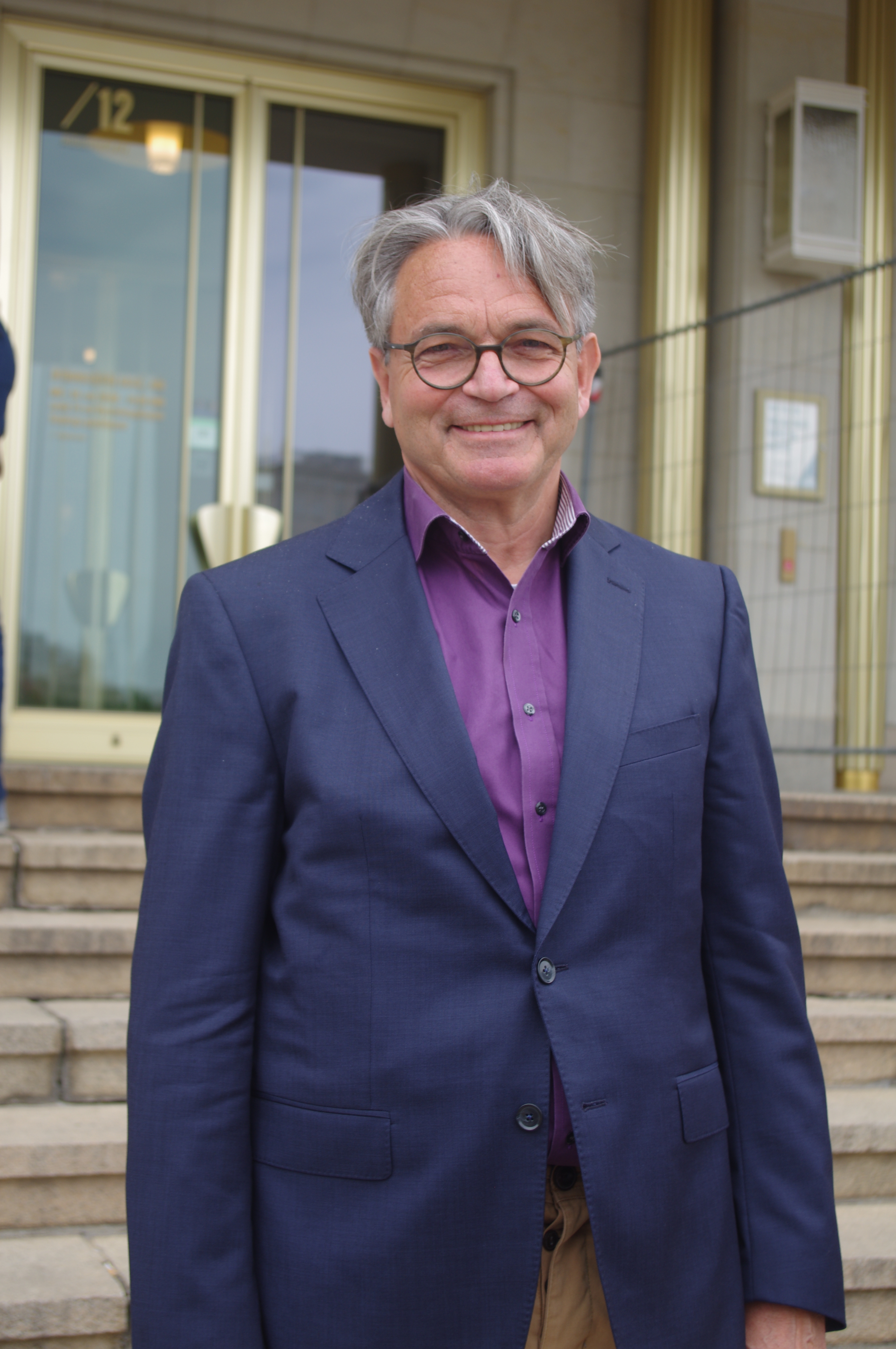
Ulf Schirmer in 2022

Ulf Schirmer (born 1959) is a German conductor and opera house administrator.

== Biography ==
Born in Eschenhausen, Lower Saxony, Schirmer studied at the Bremen Conservatory, and also at the Hochschule für Musik und Theater Hamburg, with György Ligeti, Christoph von Dohnányi and Horst Stein. He worked as an assistant to Lorin Maazel and conducted at the Wiener Staatsoper productions of Luciano Berio's Un re in ascolto, Arnold Schoenberg's Erwartung, and Alexander Glazunov's Raymonda.

From 1988 to 1991, Schirmer was Generalmusikdirektor (GMD) of the city of Wiesbaden, serving as artistic director of symphonic concerts and opera and ballet at the Hessisches Staatstheater Wiesbaden. He conducted Hans Werner Henze's Das verratene Meer in 1990. In 1999, he conducted the premiere of Gerd Kühr's opera Tod und Teufel at the Grazer Oper. His other work in opera has included conducting the first staged production of Szenen aus dem Leben der Heiligen Johanna by Walter Braunfels, at the Deutsche Oper Berlin in 2008.

Schirmer was appointed professor at the Hochschule für Musik und Theater in Hamburg in 2000, teaching musical analysis and musical dramaturgy. From 2006 to 2017, he was chief conductor of the Münchner Rundfunkorchester (Munich Radio Orchestra).

From 2009 to 2022, Schirmer was general music director (Generalmusikdirektor, GMD) of the Oper Leipzig. On 23 March 2011, Schirmer was elected Intendant of the Oper Leipzig, with an initial five-year term beginning in August 2011, in addition to his title as GMD. He conducted the first Bayreuth staging of Wagner's early opera Die Feen in 2013. In June 2017, Oper Leipzig announced the extension of Schirmer's contract as Intendant through the 2021–2022 season. Schirmer stood down from both Oper Leipzig posts at the close of the 2021–2022 season.

Outside of Germany, Schirmer was principal conductor of the Danish Radio Symphony Orchestra from 1995 to 1998.

== Recordings ==
Schirmer's commercial recordings include the following:

- Joseph Beer: Polnische Hochzeit (CPO)
- Alban Berg: Lulu (Chandos)
- Leonard Bernstein: Trouble in Tahiti (BR-Klassik)
- Leo Fall: Die Dollarprizessin (CPO)
- Charles Gounod: Cinq-Mars (Palazzetto Bru Zane Ediciones Singulares)
- Engelbert Humperdinck: Dornröschen (CPO)
- Franz Lehár:
  - Das Fürstenkind (CPO)
  - Das Land des Lächelns (CPO)
  - Der Zarewitsch (CPO)
  - Friederike (CPO)
  - Giuditta (CPO)
  - Paganini (CPO)
  - Schön is die Welt (CPO)
- Albert Lortzing: Regina (CPO)
- Bohuslav Martinů: The Greek Passion (Koch Schwann)
- Otto Nicolai: Die lustigen Weiber von Windsor (CPO)
- Carl Nielsen
  - Maskarade (Decca)
  - Saul en David (Chandos)
- Camille Saint-Saëns: Proserpine (Palazzetto Bru Zane Ediciones Singulares)
- Richard Strauss
  - Capriccio (Decca)
  - Feuersnot (CPO)
  - Intermezzo (CPO)
- Carl Maria von Weber: Sylvana (CPO)
- Ermanno Wolf-Ferrari: Le donne curiose (CPO)

His recording of Karl Amadeus Hartmann's Des Simplicius Simplicissimus Jugend was awarded the ECHO Klassik in 2010 in the category opera of the 20th/21st century. The work, commissioned by the Bayerischer Rundfunk, was performed in its reconstructed first version, with soloists Camilla Nylund and Christian Gerhaher. Other recordings include the violin concerto by Max Reger with soloist Ulf Wallin.

Cultural offices
Preceded by Leif Segerstam	Principal Conductor, Danish National Symphony Orchestra; 1995–1998	Succeeded by Gerd Albrecht
Preceded by Marcello Viotti	Chief Conductor, Münchner Rundfunkorchester; 2006–2017	Succeeded by Ivan Repušić
Preceded by Leif Segerstam	Generalmusikdirektor, Oper Leipzig; 2009–2022	Succeeded by Christoph Gedschold
