= Joseph Beer =

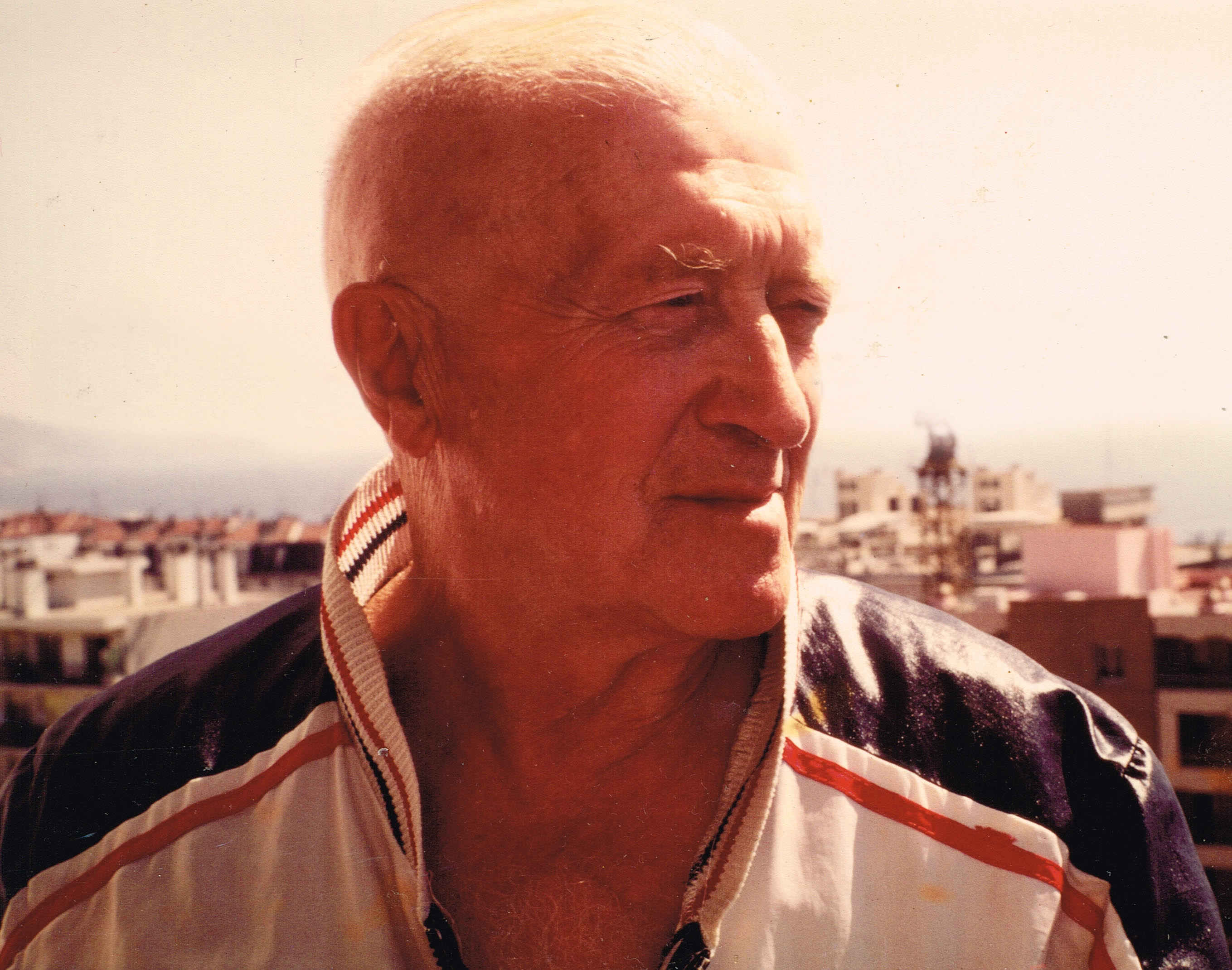
Joseph Beer on the Balcony of his Composition Room--1987, Nice, France

Joseph Beer (German pronunciation: [ˈbeːr]; 7 May 1908 – 23 November 1987) was a composer who worked mainly in the genres of operettas, singspiele, and operas.

Beer started composing music as a young man in Vienna in the 1930s. His operettas Der Prinz von Schiras and Polnische Hochzeit premiered at the Zürich Opera House in 1934 and 1937, respectively.

Beer, ethnically Jewish, fled Austria in 1938 for France. His family stayed in Poland and subsequently perished in the Nazi extermination camps. Beer continued composing new works until the end of his life, and left a large number of composition for the stage.

== Early life ==
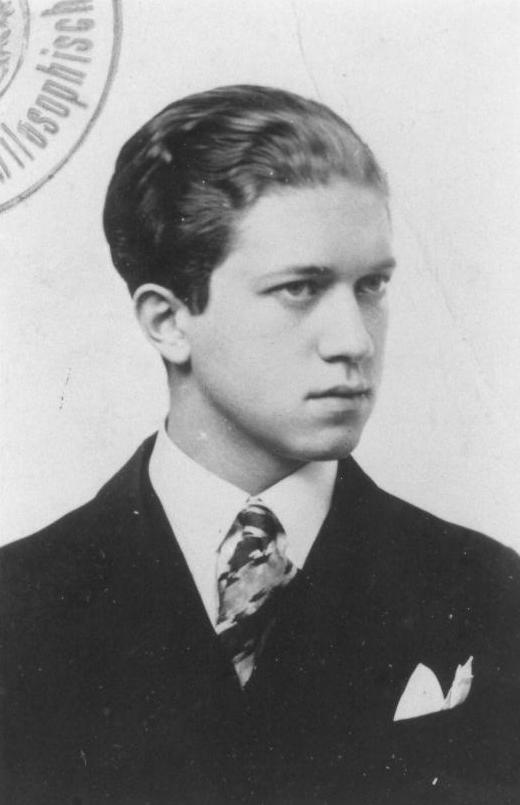
Joseph Beer in Highschool

Beer was born in 1908 in Chodorow, Galicia, today Khodoriv near Lviv, the second child of Uri Isidore Beer, a wealthy banker, and Amelie Esther Malka Beer nee Silver; he had an older brother and a younger sister. Beer started composing in his early teens and attended the Lviv Conservatory at the time called Lwów Conservatory, during his high school years.

To please his father, he first completed a year of law studies at Lviv University, succeeding in the final exam on the question of Lex Salica, and was then applied with his father's backing at the Staatsakademie und Hochschule für Musik und darstellende Kunst in Vienna. He was admitted, allowed to skip the first four years, and immediately joined the master classes of Joseph Marx. (Note: Joseph Marx had also studied law to appease his father.) Following this success, his father set Joseph up in a two-bedroom apartment in central Vienna with his own baby-grand piano. In 1930, he graduated with highest honors.

== Career ==
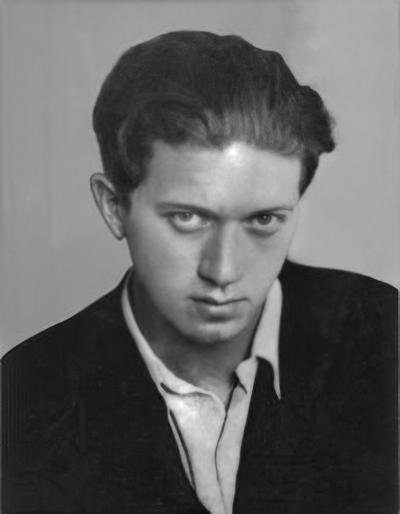
Joseph Beer--Teatr an der Wien Poster

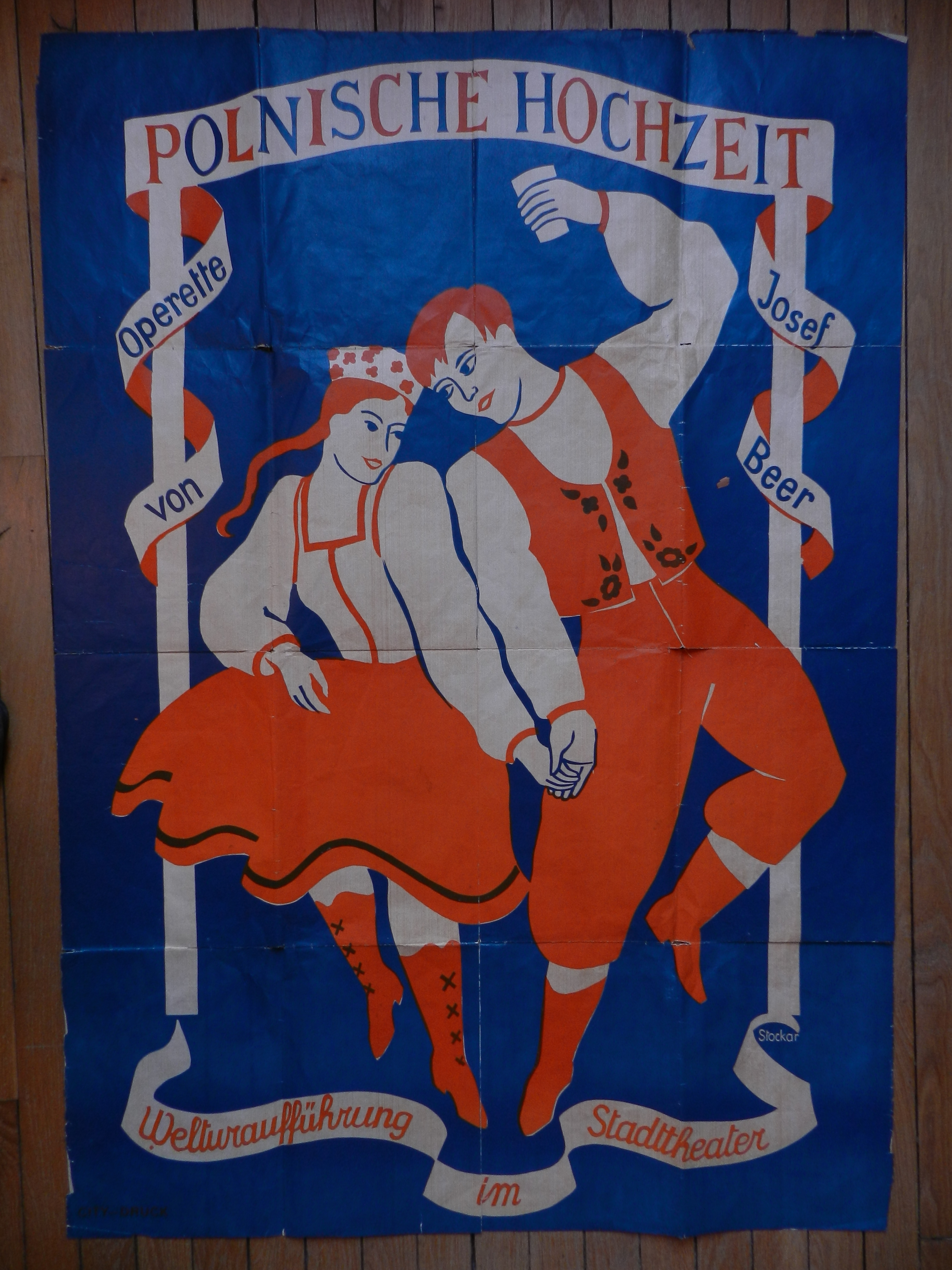
Poster Polnische Hochzeit premiere, Zürich Opera House, April 3, 1937

Beer joined a Viennese ballet company as conductor and toured with the company extensively in Austria and throughout the Middle East. While on tour, he played some of his compositions for the librettist Fritz Löhner-Beda who was so impressed that he became very instrumental in Beer's budding career. Their first collaboration, Der Prinz von Schiras, which also included the librettist Ludwig Herzer, premiered on 31 March 1934 at the Zürich Opera House and then toured extensively in Europe and South America.

Joseph Marx wrote a congratulatory letter to his former pupil, enthusiastically stating that in his first work, Beer had displayed a knowledge and mastery that "few established operetta composers possess."

Beer's second work, Polnische Hochzeit to a libretto by Fritz Löhner-Beda and Alfred Grünwald, premiered in Zürich in 1937. It had tremendous success and within a few years was performed throughout Europe on some 40 stages (including the Theater an der Wien in Vienna, the Teatr Wielki in Warsaw, and the Teatro Fontalba in Madrid) and translated into eight languages.

Following the Anschluss in 1938, Beer had to flee Austria. He was granted a visa by the French government and settled in a hotel room in Paris. He adapted instrumental works for orchestras and received a commission from a conductor at the Zürich Opera House for a work to be performed under the latter's name. He completed this work, including all the orchestral and voice parts, in just three weeks, without the benefit of a piano.

After the German's captured Paris in 1940, Beer, who was enrolled in the Polish army-in-exile, tried to join up with his military unit in England, but failed to find passage from Bordeaux before the port closed. He escaped to Nice in the south of France and remained there until the end of the war.

While continuing to arrange works for orchestra, he also composed his third major work, Stradella in Venedig based on Alessandro Stradella's adventures in Venice. When the Nazis occupied all of France in 1942, Beer went into hiding, using the name "Jean Joseph Bérard". During this time, his father, his mother and his sister, who had remained in Lviv, were caught in the Lwów Ghetto. Postcards written under false names suggest they survived the Lviv pogroms of 1941, but communication ceased in 1942, when they were likely sent to concentration camps, perhaps after the "Great Aktion" (Großaktion) of August 1942 when between 40,000 and 50,000 Jews were deported from the Lemberg Ghetto to Belzec. Beer thought his parents had been murdered in Auschwitz and his younger sister Suzanne in Buchenwald. His librettist Fritz Löhner-Beda was murdered in Monowitz (Auschwitz III) on 4 December 1942.

Following the war, Beer became increasingly withdrawn and refused performance rights to his previous works. Still, Polnische Hochzeit was performed in Scandinavia without his co-operation or consent—even posthumously up until 2005—often under the title Masurkka. In 1946 his oratorio Ave Maria premiered at the Notre Dame Cathedral in Nice with tenor Enzo Seri and soprano Lotte Schöne.

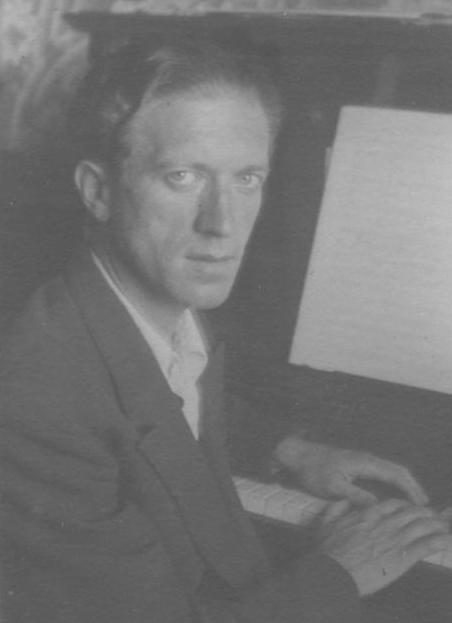
Joseph Beer During WWII

Stradella in Venedig, composed during his years in hiding, premiered in 1949 at the Zürich Opera House. The music critic Kurt Pahlen called it "a comic opera of the highest sort" and the member of the Académie Française André Roussin adapted the libretto for the French stage.

== Later life ==
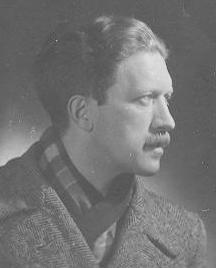
Joseph Beer Post-War

After the war years Beer married a young German Jewish refugee, Hanna Königsberg, in 1957. They had two daughters, Suzanne and Béatrice.

In 1966, Beer earned a doctorate in musicology from the Sorbonne University under the direction of renowned musicologist Jacques Chailley and the presidency of the French philosopher and musicologist, Vladimir Jankélévitch. The topic of Beer's thesis was The Evolution of Harmonic Style in the Work of Scriabin for which he received the highest honors (Très honorable avec félicitations du jury).

He died in Nice on November 23, 1987. Beer's family founded the Joseph & Hanna Beer Foundation to perpetuate the memory of the composer and to increase his recognition by a worldwide audience and inclusion in the standard operatic repertoire.

Beer is the Composer-in-Residence In Memoriam of The Atlantic Coast Opera Festival, a Philadelphia-based international summer opera festival.
