= Orquesta Sinfónica de la Universidad de Guanajuato =

Mexican symphony orchestra

The Orquesta Sinfónica de la Universidad de Guanajuato (OSUG) is the resident symphonic orchestra for the University of Guanajuato, located in the state of the same name in central Mexico. It was founded shortly after the School of Music at the University in 1952 under the direction of José Rodríguez Frausto. This made the University for first in Mexico with a resident symphonic orchestra.

== History ==
Over its history, the orchestra has worked with national and international soloists and directors such as Eduardo Mata, Enrique Diemecke, Kurt Pahlen, Kurt Redel, Leif Segerstam, Neeme Järvi, Pascal Verrot, John DeMain, Jorge Federico Osorio, Claude Helffer, Homero Francesch, Bernard Flavigny, Christian Lindberg, Gerhart Muench, Jorge Risi, Phillipe Pelletier, Fernando de la Mora, Encarnación Vázquez and Ramón Vargas.

Enrique Bátiz became director in 2005. Prior to Guanajuato, Bátiz founded the Symphonic Orchestra of the State of Mexico in 1971 and was its director. He has participated in over 500 concerts in various parts of the world and in 145 recordings including those with the Royal Philharmonic Orchestra, the London Philharmonic Orchestra and the Mexico City Philharmonic Orchestra.(boletin) OSUG maintains strong ties to the State of Mexico orchestra, playing with the Chorus of this orchestra in 2010, and having Luis Manuel Sánchez from the Youth Symphonic Orchestra of the state as a guest conductor.

The orchestra is a regular performer at the annual Festival Internacional Cervantino, which occurs in the same city in which the orchestra is based. For the 2011 version, OSUG is scheduled to perform works by Gustav Mahler and Franz Liszt.

== Ensamble Zephyrus ==
The Ensamble Zephyrus is a quintet of members of the Orquesta Sinfónica de la Universidad de Guanajuato (OSUG) who play more contemporary pieces on wind instruments with the aim of reaching younger audiences. Members of the group include Helen Louise Wolff on flute, Héctor Eduardo Fernández Purata on oboe, Hugo Manzanilla Victoria on clarinet, Michelle Lee Pettit on French horn and Alan Monahan on bassoon. It has also had guest artists playing with them such as Antonio Rosales on bass clarinet. Their repertoire has included works by Afforismi II, George Perle, Iris Szeghy, Leoš Janáček and Josúe Zamora from the state of Guanajuato. The quintet has played in conjunction with the OSUG and separately under their own name such as in the Festival Internacional Cervantino.
