= Blair Quartet =

String quartet at Vanderbilt University

The Blair String Quartet is the string quartet-in-residence at the Blair School of Music of Vanderbilt University, As of 2022, consisting of violinists Cornelia Heard and Stephen Miahky, violist Eric Wong and cellist Felix Wang. They perform frequently at Blair, and have also performed at the Library of Congress, the Kennedy Center, and the Weill Recital Hall. In 1980 the Blair Quartet consisted of violinists Christian Teal and Lee Joiner, violist Kathryn Plummer, and cellist David Vanderkool as members. Prior members also include violist Christina McGann, and cellist Grace Mihi Bahng. Stephen Clapp was lead violinist from 1967 to 1972.

Their repertoire ranges from traditional classical music, including Mendelssohn, Debussy, and Ginastera, to contemporary classical music, including John Harbison, George Rochberg, and George Tsontakis. They have also worked with jazz banjoist Bela Fleck and bluegrass bassist Edgar Meyer. Meyer and Fleck composed a Quintet for Banjo and String Quartet (1984) together for performance with the Blair Quartet. Michael Hersch's piece Images from a Closed Ward (2010) was commissioned by the Blair Quartet, who premiered the work and recorded it. They commissioned and premiered Daniel Bernard Roumain's String Quartet no. 1: X (1993), dedicated to Malcolm X.

== Discography ==
- Ginastera: String Quartet No. 1 and Proto: String Quartet No. 1 (1979, Red Mark RM 3105)
- Quintet For Piano And Strings and Quartet No. 3 (1980, Varèse Sarabande), Roy Harris
- From Mozart to Ravel (1995, Warner Bros.), various, including Mozart and Ravel
- Charles Ives: String Quartets (2006, Naxos), Charles Ives
- Images from a Closed Ward (2014, Innova Records #884), Michael Hersch
- Quintet for Banjo and String Quartet, Meyer and Fleck, featured on the PBS series Lonesome Pine Special
