= Vienna Festival =

Annual culture festival in Vienna

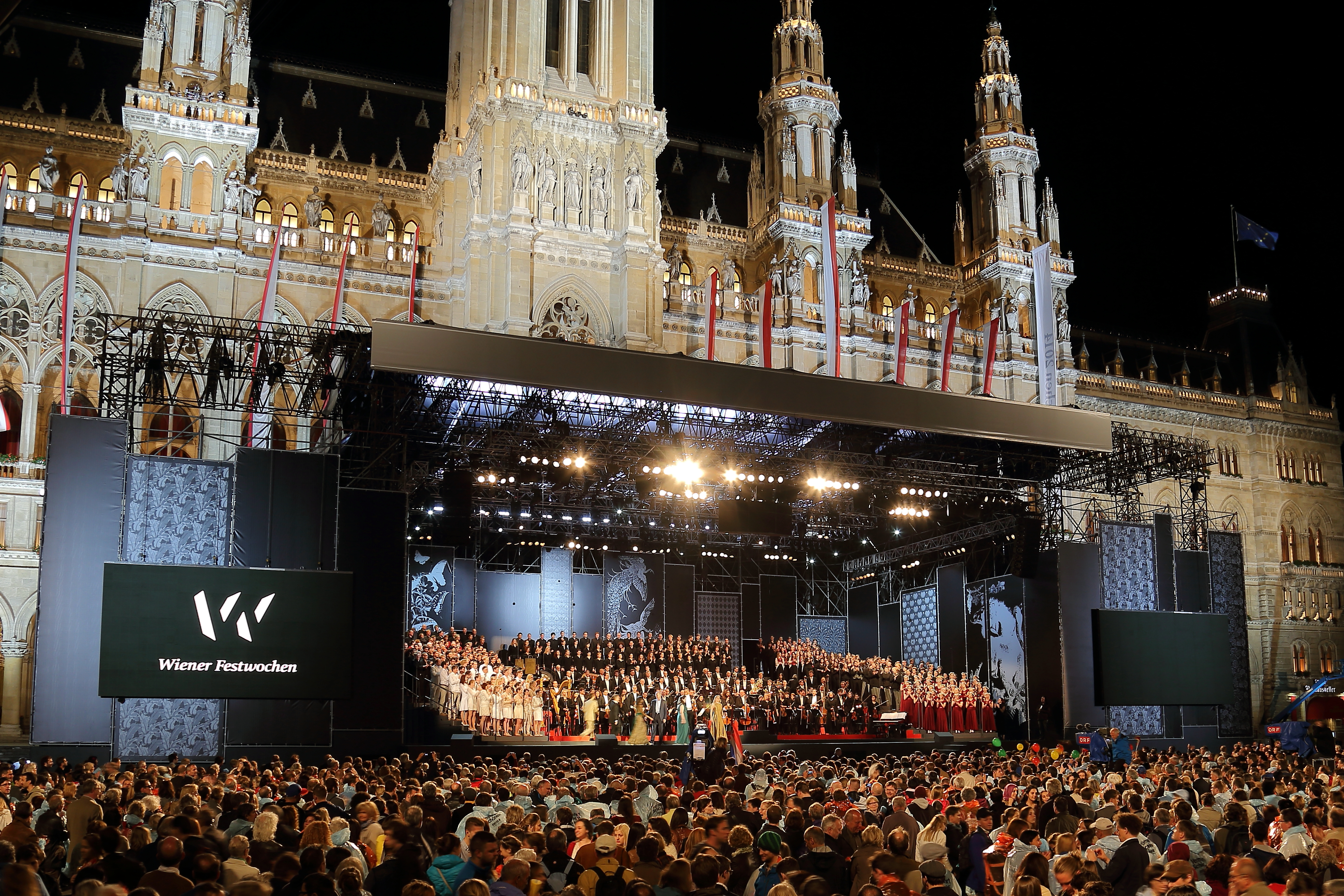
Opening Ceremony Wiener Festwochen 2014

The Vienna Festival (Wiener Festwochen) is a culture festival that takes place in Vienna for five or six weeks in May and June every year. The Vienna Festival was established in 1951, when Vienna was still occupied by the four Allied powers.

With a radical socio-political impact, the Vienna Festival | Free Republic of Vienna is Europe's most significant cross-over festival.

The Vienna Festival features theatre, opera and dance from all parts of the globe, also acting as producers of international works.

Each year, the Vienna Festival is launched with a free, public open-air event held in the square outside of Vienna's City Hall.

The festival attracts about 100,000 visitors per year.

== Directors ==
Directors of the festival include:

- 1951–1958: Adolph Ario
- 1959: Rudolf Gamsjäger
- 1960–1964: Egon Hilbert
- 1964–1977: Ulrich Baumgartner
- 1978–1979: Gerhard Freund
- 1980–1984: Helmut Zilk
- 1984–1991: Ursula Pasterk
- 1991–1996: Klaus Bachler
- 1997–2001: Luc Bondy / Klaus-Peter Kehr / Hortensia Völckers
- 2002–2013: Luc Bondy
- 2014–2016: Markus Hinterhäuser
- 2017–2021: Tomas Zierhofer-Kin
- 2019–2023: Christophe Slagmuylder
- from 2024: Milo Rau

== History ==
For five to six weeks during May and June every year, the Vienna Festival seeks to create or contribute to cultural events that combine highest artistic demands and relevant socio-political issues and goals. As an innovative and international urban festival, the Vienna Festival opens a window to the international world of theatre and features a wide range of contemporary art forms and languages.

The programme seeks to bridge tradition and current developments in productions from all genres: operas, concerts, drama, performances, installations, readings, films. Valued classics are shown in new productions next to premieres of contemporary works with international directors; artists as well as ensembles from across the globe present celebrated works, frequently in their original languages.

The programme usually comprises about forty productions as well as numerous additional events that are free of charge.

The very first Vienna Festival events took place as early as 1927. The Vienna Festival was then re-established after the Second World War, in 1951, while the city of Vienna was still occupied by the Allies. In 1952, the Vienna Festival was one of the founding organisations of the European Festivals Association. The Theater an der Wien has been one of the festival’s main stages since 1962, next to Halle E and Halle G at MuseumsQuartier. Productions are also staged at numerous further, varying sites across the city.

Luc Bondy was the Vienna Festival’s artistic director from 2002, having already been its director of performing arts from 1998. Between 2014 and 2016, Markus Hinterhäuser took on the festival’s artistic direction, followed by Tomas Zierhofer-Kin in the years 2017 and 2018.

Under the artistic directorship of Christophe Slagmuylder (2019 – 2023), the Vienna Festival became Festwochen 2020 reframed during the first year of the COVID-19 pandemic, with digital events on offer during May and June followed by fifteen live productions staged between 26 August and 26 September 2020. Most of the world premieres that had originally been scheduled for that year were shifted to 2021. In 2024, artistic director Milo Rau proclaimed the Free Republic of Vienna as a total work of art – from the opening event via various productions and the topical focus to the Vienna Declaration (Constitution of the Free Republic of Vienna). The future form of festivals was debated in a range of participative formats, such as the Council of the Republic, and with an extended network of local and international partners. Real protagonists of current events appeared in three Vienna Trials – productions staged as judicial trials. The newly established Academy Second Modernism is the global women composers’ platform of the Vienna Festival | Free Republic of Vienna, which aims to significantly raise the share of works by women composers featured in the programmes of concerts, festivals and operas across the globe. Its patron is Nuria Nono-Schoenberg.

== Highlights ==
- 1951 "Don Giovanni“ by Wolfgang Amadeus Mozart, direction: Oscar Fritz Schuh, musical direction: Karl Böhm
- 1976 "Proletenpassion“ by and with Schmetterlinge
- 1981 the poetical varieté "Flic Flac“ by André Heller
- 1983 "Maskerade“, operetta, libretto and text: Walter Reisch, music and musical direction: Georg Kreisler, direction: Heinz Marecek
- 1985 "Die Riesen vom Berge“ by Luigi Pirandello, direction: Hans Gratzer
- 1985 "Besuchszeit“ by Felix Mitterer
- 1986 "Anima“ by Erwin Piplits
- 1987 "Ajax“ by Sophokles, direction: Peter Sellars
- 1990 "Don Giovanni“ by Wolfgang Amadeus Mozart, direction: Luc Bondy, musical direction: Claudio Abbado, stage: Erich Wonder
- 1993 "Les Atrides“ by and with Théâtre du Soleil, direction: Ariane Mnouchkine
- 1993 "The Cave“ by Steve Reich
- 1994 "Kill Pig Devil Passion Finish God“, dance theatre by Martin Kušej
- 1996 "Alma – A Show biz ans Ende“, direction: Paulus Manker, with Johanna Wokalek
- 1997 "Aus Deutschland“ by Mauricio Kagel, direction: Herbert Wernicke
- 1998 "Figaro lässt sich scheiden“ by Ödön von Horváth, direction: Luc Bondy, with Gert Voss, Paulus Manker, Erni Mangold, Gertraud Jesserer, Anne Tismer, Herbert Föttinger, Helmuth Lohner
- 1999 "Bählamms Fest“ by Olga Neuwirth, musical direction: Johannes Kalitzke, direction: Nick Broadhurst
- 2000 "Bitte liebt Österreich!“ by Christoph Schlingensief
- 2001 "Shockheaded Peter“ music and adaption: Martyn Jacques, direction: Julian Crouch & Phelim McDermott
- 2003 "Forever Young“ after Tennessee Williams’ "Sweet Bird of Youth“, adapted by Frank Castorf
- 2004 "Cosi fan tutte" by Wolfgang Amadeus Mozart, direction: Robert Lehmeier
- 2005 "Schutz vor der Zukunft“ by Christoph Marthaler
- 2006 "Dido and Aeneas“ by Henry Purcell, musical direction: William Christie, direction: Deborah Warner
- 2006 "Claus Peymann kauft sich eine Hose und geht mit mir essen“ by Thomas Bernhard, direction: Claus Peymann
- 2007 "König Lear“ by William Shakespeare, direction: Luc Bondy
- 2007 "Aus einem Totenhaus“ by Leoš Janáček, musical direction: Pierre Boulez, direction: Patrice Chéreau
- 2009 "Riesenbutzbach“ a project by Christoph Marthaler and Anna Viebrock, direction: Christoph Marthaler
- 2009 "Othello“ by William Shakespeare, direction: Peter Sellars
- 2014 "La Barque le soir" after Tarjei Vesaas, direction: Claude Régy
- 2014 "Orfeo ed Euridice" by Christoph Willibald Gluck, direction: Romeo Castellucci, musical direction: Jérémie Rhorer
- 2015 "Luci mie traditrici" by Salvatore Sciarrino, musical direction: Emilio Pomàrico, direction: Achim Freyer
- 2016 "Fidelio" by Ludwig van Beethoven, musical direction: Marc Minkowski, direction: Achim Freyer
- 2016 "Wir Hunde / Us Dogs" by SIGNA
- 2017 Hyperreality – Festival for Club Culture – Vienna, music festival curated by Marlene Engel
- 2018 "Stadium" by Mohamed El Khatib
- 2019 "3 Episodes of Life" by Markus Öhrn
- 2019 "Diamante" by Mariano Pensotti
- 2020 "Die Goldberg Variationen" by Johann Sebastian Bach, choreography: Anne Teresa De Keersmaeker, piano: Pavel Kolesnikov
- 2021 "Catarina e a beleza de matar fascistas" by Tiago Rodrigues
- 2022 "Requiem" by Wolfgang Amadeus Mozart, direction: Romeo Castellucci, musical direction: Raphaël Pichon
- 2022 "Einstein on the Beach" by Philip Glass, direction: Susanne Kennedy, Markus Selg, musical direction: André de Ridder
- 2023 "Lulu" by Alban Berg, direction: Marlene Monteiro Freitas, musical direction: Maxime Pascal
- 2023 "Pieces of a Woman" by Kata Wéber, direction: Kornél Mundruczó
- 2024 "SANCTA" by Florentina Holzinger, musical direction: Marit Strindlund

== See also ==
- List of opera festivals
