= Polnische Hochzeit =

1937 operetta by Joseph Beer

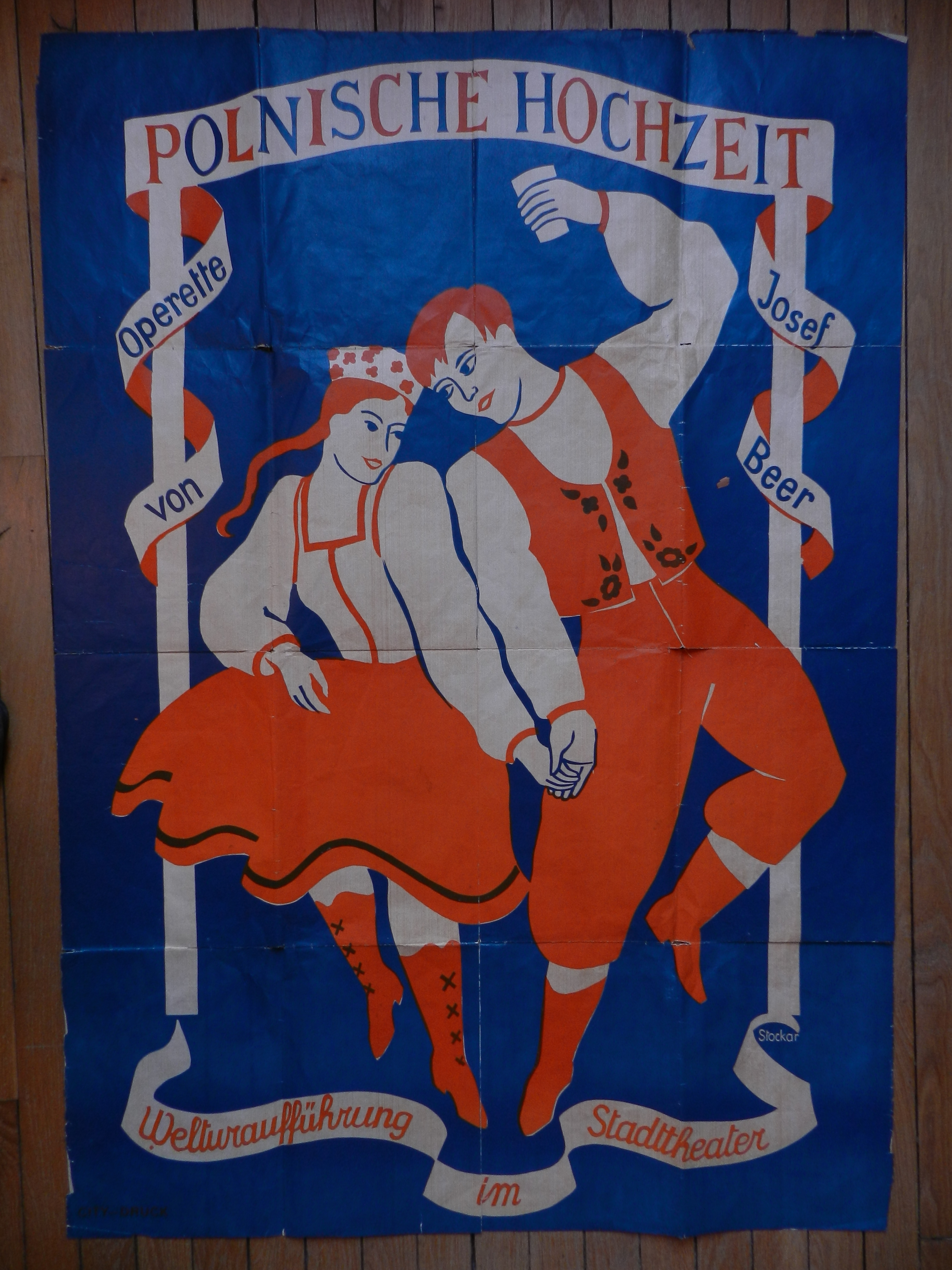
Premiere poster

Polnische Hochzeit (Polish Wedding) is a 1937 operetta by the Polish Jewish composer Joseph Beer to a libretto by his mentor Fritz Löhner-Beda and Alfred Grünwald, which premiered on 3 April 1937 at the Zürich Opera House. The Austrian premiere followed on 6 November 1937 in Linz. The operetta received spectacular success. Within a few years it was performed throughout Europe on some 40 stages (including the Theater an der Wien in Vienna, the Teatr Wielki in Warsaw, and the Teatro Fontalba in Madrid) and translated into eight languages.

The following year, following the Anschluss in 1938, Beer fled Austria and his works were suppressed by the Nazis.

The Staatsoperette Dresden presented the first performance in Germany on 22 April 2023.
