= Roman Ledenev =

Soviet and Russian composer and music teacher (1930–2019)

- Born: Roman Semyonovich Ledenev; 4 December 1930; Moscow, USSR
- Died: August 15, 2019 (aged 88)
- Resting place: Troekurovskoye Cemetery
- Education: Moscow Conservatory (1955, 1988)
- Known for: Film Music Composer, Music Teacher
- Awards: People's Artist of the Russian Federation (1995), State Prize of the Russian Federation (1997)

Roman Semenovich Ledenev (December 4, 1930 - August 15, 2019) was a Soviet and Russian composer and music teacher, professor at the Moscow Conservatory. He was a People's Artist of the Russian Federation (1995).

== Biography ==
Ledenev was born on 4 December 1930 in Moscow. In 1948, he graduated from the 'Central Music School' (in the class of E. I. Messner and V. Ya. Shebalin), and in 1955, he enrolled in Moscow Conservatory (in the class of N. P. Rakova, and A. N. Aleksandrovich), graduating in 1958 from the Conservatory in "Composition" (under the advisory of A. N. Aleksandrov).

From 1956 to 1964, he was a professor at Moscow State University, and taught polyphony, solfeggio, instrumentation, harmony, and composition (as an assistant).

In 1978, he began to formally teach his own composition class, becoming a fully fledged professor in 1991.

In 2006, Ledenev became a professor at the Central Music School as well, teaching a compositional class.

On 15 August 2019, Ledenov died, and was buried in Moscow in the Troekurovsky Cemetery.

== Memberships ==
He was a member of the Union of Composers of the USSR (Russian Federation), becoming the Union's secretary from 1970 to 1973, and then again from 1995 to 2006.

He was also a member of the Union of Cinematographers and the International Academy of Art.

== Compositions ==
=== Musical theater ===
- Ballet "The Tale of the Green Balls" (1967)

=== Works for orchestra ===
- "Rus is green and snow-white"
- Symphony in Simple Modes (1991)
- Variations on a theme by Haydn (1996).

=== Works for solo instrument and orchestra ===
- Violin Concerto (1964; ed. - M., 1972)
- Concert-poem for viola (1964; M., 1967)
- Concert-elegy for cello (1979; M., 1983)
- Romance Concert (1981)
- "Epigraphs" for flute and chamber orchestra (1989)
- "Concert recitation" for cello and orchestra (1990)
- “Something unclear…” (concert fantasy for violin and orchestra, 1995)
- "Con sordini (Little Requiem)" for viola and chamber orchestra (1998)
- "Triptych in memory of Sviridov" (1999), symphonic story "Winter Way" in memory of B. Tchaikovsky (2001)

=== Chamber-instrumental compositions ===
- Ten Sketches (1967; Moscow, 1977)
- Seven Moods (1967; Moscow, 1979; Leipzig, 1972)
- Nocturnes (1968; Budapest, 1972)
- Four Sketches (1972; Moscow, 1979)
- Six Pieces for String quartet and harp (1966; M., 1971)
- "Metamorphoses of the theme of J. S. Bach" for viola and chamber ensemble (1993)
- "I play the clarinet", suite for clarinet and piano (1972; M., 1975)
- Sonata for clarinet and piano (1952; M., 1960)
- String quartets (1958, 2000)
- Prelude and chorale for quartet with piano (2002); «Color Postcards» for 2 pianos (2002)
- Sonata for piano (1957; Moscow, 1960)

=== Vocal music ===
- "The Seasons" for two choirs and an instrumental ensemble (a cycle of cycles in six notebooks)
- Four spiritual hymns (1991)
- Six fragments from the All-Night Vigil (1995)
- "Wreath to Sviridov" (words by S. Yesenin, A. Blok, V. Kostrov; 1998)
- "From the Hours of R.-M. Rilke" (2000)
- Three miniatures for women's choir (2003)
- "Russian Pictures" and "Hymns of Russia" (both - words of Russian poets; 2003)
- Five Spiritual Works (2004)
- "Unsung Song" (words of contemporary Russian poets )
- “At Twilight” (lyrics by A. Blok and V. Khodasevich)
- “Parisian Note” (lyrics by Russian emigrant poets; all three - 2005)
- “Six Poems of Russian Poets” for female choir (2006), “From Russian poetry" (10 choirs) for mixed choir (2006)
- "Nekrasov's Notebooks" for bass and piano (1974; M., 1984), poem "Native Side" to the words of N. Nekrasov,
- "Three Poems" to the words of N. Rubtsov (1988)
- "Night and Day" for soprano and piano (to words by A. Fet and F. Tyutchev, 2000)

=== Film music ===
- 1962 - " Knight's move "
- 1963 - " Heat "
- 1966 - " Wings "
- 1966 - Uncle's Dream
- 1967 - " The Beginning of an Unknown Age " (short story "The Motherland of Electricity")
- 1969 - " At the thirteenth hour of the night "
- 1970 - " City of First Love " (episode "Stalingrad - 1942")
- 1971 - " All the King's Men "
- 1972 - " Fifty-Fifty "
- 1977 - " Strange Woman"
- 1979 - " Poem about wings"
- 1980 - " Atlantes and Caryatids"
- 1983 - " Comic lover, or Sir John Falstaff's love affairs" (co authored with Andrey Ledenev)
- 1983 - " Bouquet of Violets"
- 1985 - " In front of myself"
- 1985 - " Document R " (co-authored with Andrey Ledenev)
- 1990 - " Superment"

== Titles and awards ==
- 1982 - Honored Art Worker of the RSFSR.
- 1995 - People's Artist of the Russian Federation.
- 1997 - State Prize of the Russian Federation.
- 2005 - Laureate of the Prize of the Russian Authors' Society.
- 2005 - Gratitude of the Minister of Culture and Mass Communications of the Russian Federation (December 5, 2005)
