= Myrtha Garbarini =

Argentine operatic soprano (1926–2015)

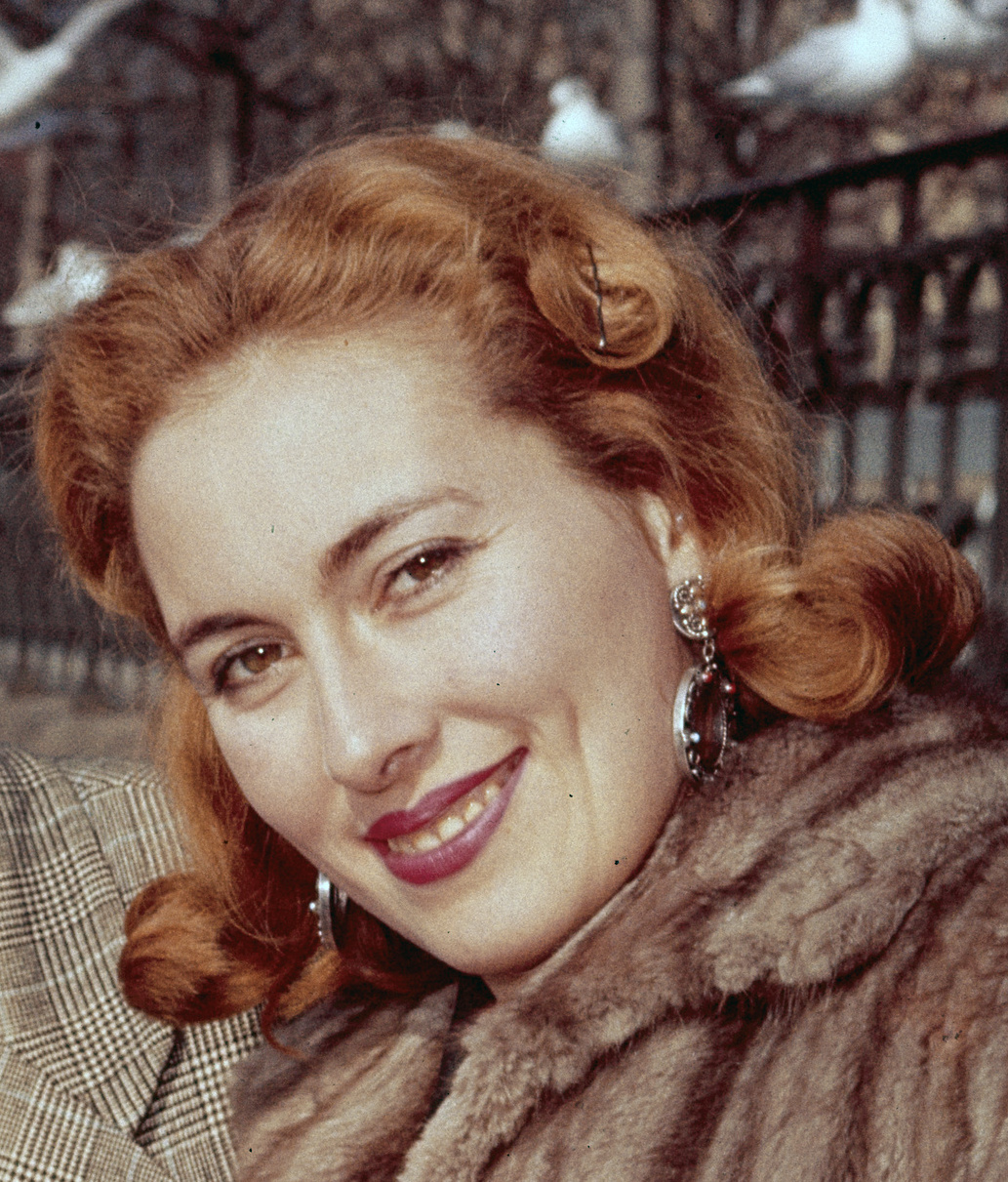
Myrtha Garbarini (1958)

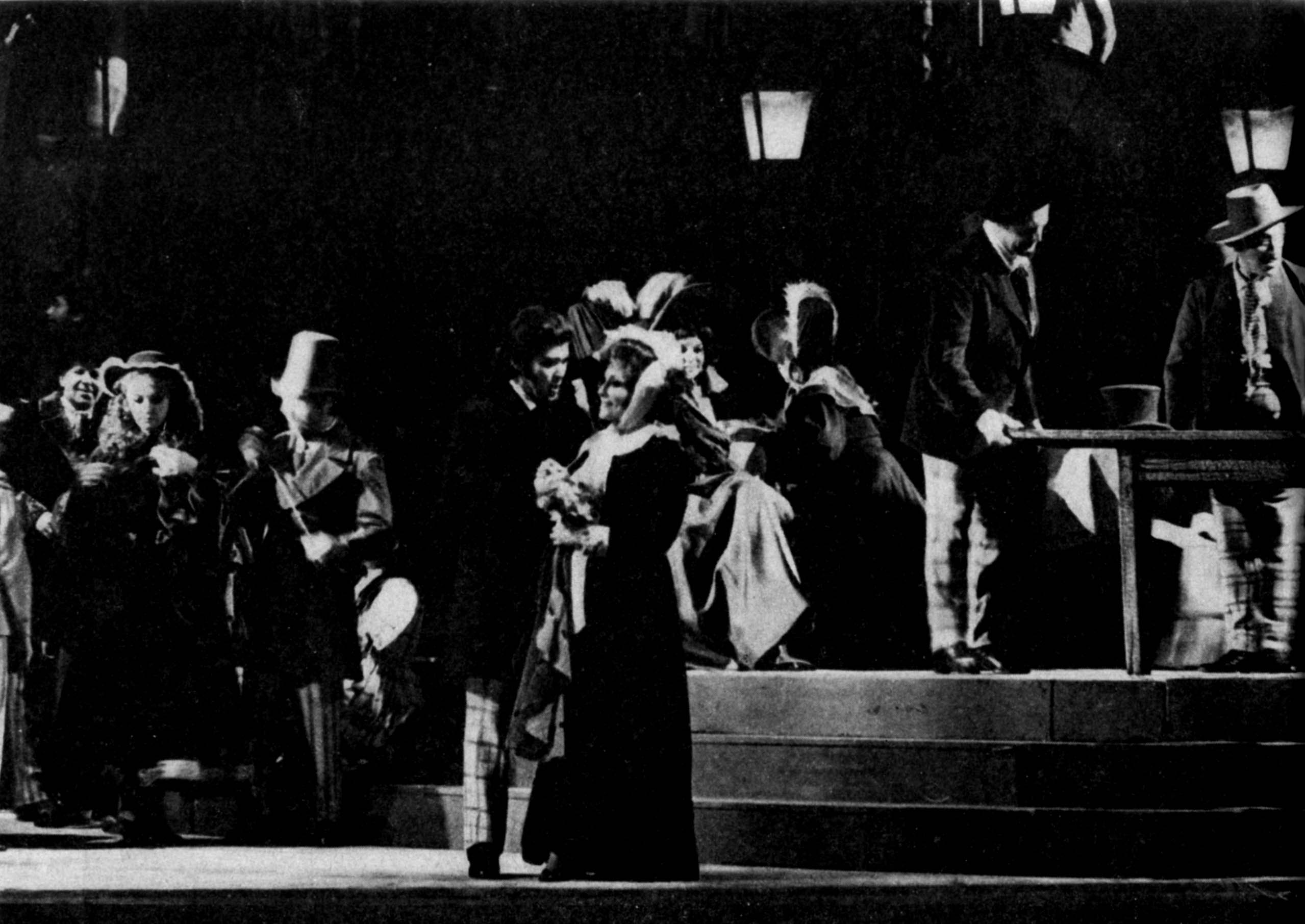
Myrtha Garbarini at the Teatro Colón with Horacio Mastrango in La Bohème (1973)

Myrtha Garbarini (1926–2015) was an Argentine operatic soprano who initially was a singer of chamber music and oratorios. From 1958, she performed at the Teatro Colón in Buenos Aires singing in some 25 operas including Le Nozze di Figaro, La Bohème and La Traviata. Garbarini was a co-founder of the Ópera de Cámara del Teatro Colón (1968). In addition to appearances in South America, she sang in the United States, Austria and Germany.

== Biography ==
Born in 1926, Myrtha Garbarini first studied music under her mother, the pianist Elvia Ochoa, and then under Elizabeth Westerkamp. She then attended the Conservatorio Nacional Superior de Música (Argentina) where she studied under Abraham Jurafsky and Arturo Luzzatti, graduating as Profesora Superior de Música. She studied voice under the Polish-born Lydia Kindermann and classical Spanish song under the soprano Conchita Badía.

In 1949, the Spanish composer Joaquín Rodrigo selected Garbarini to sing his Madrigales Amatorios, accompanying her on the piano at the Club Español in Buenos Aires. In 1953, she performed at the Sociedad de Conciertos de Cámara, singing the ten songs in El Alba del Alhelí by Juan Orrego-Salas. In the late 1950s, she toured Europe performing in Basel, Stuttgart, Saltzburg and Vienna. It was in 1958 that she joined the Teatro Colón where she first performed in The Love for Three Oranges and went on to sing major roles in some 25 operas, including the Argentine works Marianita Limeña by Valdo Sciammarella, Sueño de Alma by Carlos López Buchardo and La Zapatera Prodigiosa by Juan José Castro.

Garbarini also sang oratorios under the baton of Karl Richter, including Bach's St John Passion and Mass in B minor, Handel's Messiah and Mozart's Requiem.

Myrtha Garbarini died in Buenos Aires on 6 January 2015.
