= Bryan Young (bassoonist) =

American bassoonist (born 1974)

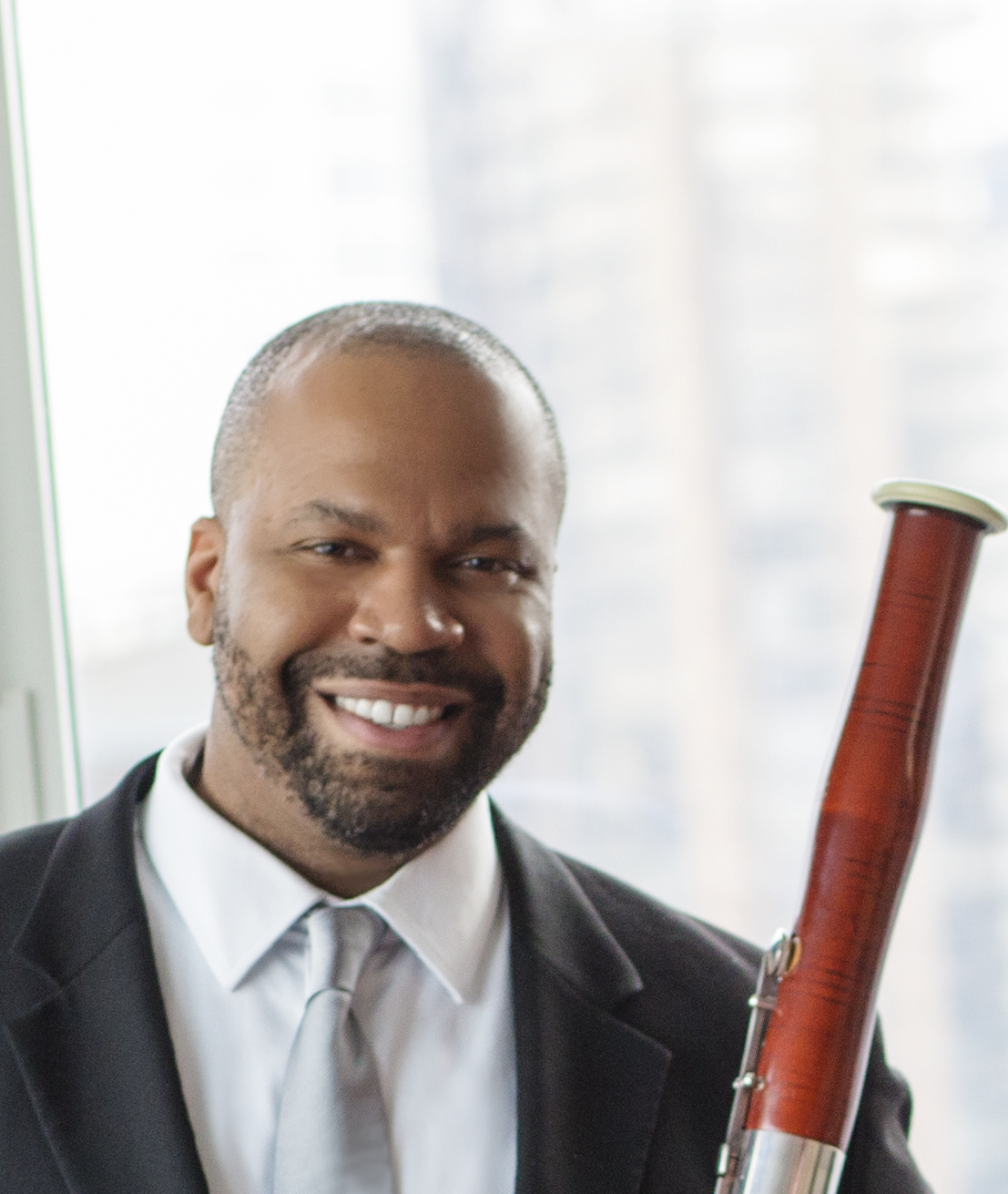
- Bryan Young in 2018

Background information
- Born: July 6, 1974 (age 52); Washington, District of Columbia, US
- Genres: Classical
- Occupations: Bassoonist; Entrepreneur
- Labels: Marquis Classics; Delos; Naxos
- Member of: Poulenc Trio
- Website: bryanyoung.info

Bryan Young (born July 6, 1974) is an American bassoonist and technology entrepreneur.

== Biography ==
Young was born in Washington D.C., and later moved to Baltimore. He is African-American.

== Career ==
=== Bassoonist ===
As a bassoonist, Young is a founding member of the Poulenc Trio, where he has toured internationally and collaborated with violinist Hilary Hahn, clarinetists David Shifrin, Anthony McGill and Alexander Fiterstein, and oboists Liang Wang and James Austin Smith. He appears on several commercial recordings with the Poulenc Trio, including Poulenc Plays Poulenc, Creation, and Trains of Thought. He is principal bassoonist with the Baltimore Chamber Orchestra and performs with the IRIS Orchestra in Memphis, TN. He was a finalist in the Fernand Gillet-Hugo Fox International Bassoon Competition, and has appeared as soloist with prominent American orchestras, including the National Symphony Orchestra and Baltimore Symphony Orchestra. Composers have dedicated works to Bryan Young, including Octavio Vázquez, Steven Gerber, and Thomas Benjamin. Young was selected to premiere To Earth by Roydon Tse, commissioned by the International Double Reed Society to celebrate its 50th anniversary. Young is a frequent guest commentator on Maryland's WBJC-FM radio program, Face the Music. Young is a Vice President of the board of Chamber Music America, is President of the Board of Candlelight Concert Society, and is a board member of the Boulanger Initiative.

=== Entrepreneur ===
As an entrepreneur, Young is recognized for his work in health care, software and e-commerce. Young served as a judge advisor for the US Centers for Medicare and Medicaid Services (CMS)’ Artificial Intelligence (AI) Health Outcomes Challenge. As founder of Intertwine Systems, Young worked with Johns Hopkins researchers to deliver cardiac monitoring software to patients in Trinidad and Tobago, and was named a 'Mobile Entrepreneur to Watch' by the Baltimore Business Journal. Young was a partner and Chief Technical Advisor for SailTime, a global e-commerce platform for boating and leisure maritime activities. Young is the former Director of Connected Healthcare Solutions at Asymmetrik, where he led digital healthcare transformation and innovation initiatives. Young is currently Principal Group Leader for Advanced Health Analytics and Artificial Intelligence at The MITRE Corporation.

== Discography ==
- Trains of Thought (2018). Poulenc Trio; Delos
- Creation (2016). Poulenc Trio; Delos
- Poulenc Plays Poulenc (2009). Poulenc Trio; Marquis Classics
