= Oboe–bassoon–piano trio =

An oboe–bassoon–piano trio is a chamber music ensemble made up of one oboe, one bassoon, and one piano, or the name of a piece written for such a group.

The ensemble is similar to the classical piano trio in which the violin is replaced by the oboe and the cello is replaced by the bassoon. The similarity of the oboe and bassoon stem from their relation as members of the double-reed woodwind trio.

Professional trios such as the Poulenc Trio are very rare, but the literature for the group is often performed by ad hoc groups.

== Repertoire ==
Trio Pathetique in D minor by Mikhail Glinka
Performed by William McColl (clarinet), Arthur Grossman (bassoon) and Stanley Chapple (piano)

The original repertoire for oboe, bassoon and piano commissioned by the Poulenc Trio includes:

- Thomas Benjamin – Scriabin Sits in at Birdland (2004) – with violin (commissioned by Poulenc Trio with Hilary Hahn)
- Thomas Benjamin - Three Etudes for Trio (2003)
- Miguel del Aguila, Tango Trio (2014)
- Viet Cuong – Trains of Thought (2012)
- Lorenzo Ferrero – DEsCH (2006)
- Steven Gerber – Prelude and Fugue (2003)
- Jakov Jakoulov – Yiddish Lexicon (2010)
- Jakov Jakoulov – Il Giorno Vivente e la Notte Eterna – concerto with orchestra (2011)
- Kendall Kennison – Trilogue (2015)
- Nataliya Medvedovskaya – First Snow (2009)
- Zurab Nadareishvili
  - Two Dialogues (2009)
  - Urban Songs (2009)
- Gaetano Panariello – Trio Filastrocca (2007)
- Gaetano Panariello Triple Concerto (2008)
- Elam Ray Sprinkle – February (2003)
- Octavio Vazquez – Triptych (2012)

=== Other compositions ===
- Enrique Gonzales-Medina – Suite Latina (2006)
- Laura Kaminsky – Horizon Lines (2011) – Music and Film
- David Sargent – Kaleidoscope (2007)
- Madeleine Dring – Trio for oboe, bassoon & harpsichord (1986)
- Jean Francaix – Trio (1994)
- Francis Poulenc – Trio for Oboe, Bassoon and Piano, FP 43
- Andre Previn – Trio (1994)
- Henri Brod – Fantasy on a Spanish Air, Op. 5
- Mikhail Glinka – Trio Pathetique
- Jancourt / Triebert
  - Rossini – Fantasie Italienne in Algiers
  - Rossini – Fantasie Concertante Semiramide
