= Ames Stradivarius =

Violin by Stradivari (1734)

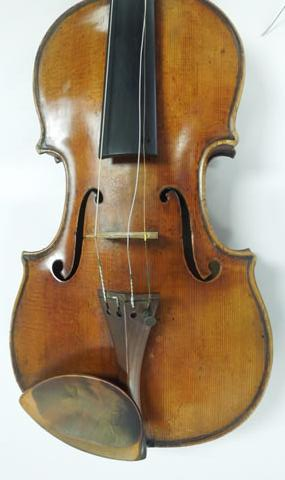
Photo of the Ames Stradivarius, taken shortly after it entered FBI custody in 2015.

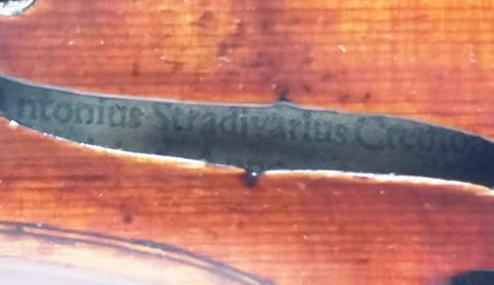
View of the words “Antonius Stradivarius Cremona” inside the left F-Hole.

The Ames Stradivarius of 1734 is an antique violin, made by the Italian luthier Antonio Stradivari of Cremona. It is one of only 450–700 known extant Stradivarius instruments in the world. The Ames is named for violinist George Ames who owned it and performed with it in the late nineteenth century.

The Ames Stradivarius was sold to Polish-born American violinist Roman Totenberg in 1943, for $15,000 (equivalent to $273,000 in 2024), and it was his only performance instrument for almost the next four decades. It was stolen from Totenberg by his former student Philip Johnson in May 1980, from his office at the Longy School of Music of Bard College, where he was then the director. Totenberg died in 2012. The violin was finally recovered in 2015, and returned to his daughters.

Johnson frequently played the violin, including in public, but it was never recognized. After Johnson's death, his ex-wife discovered the Stradivarius in his belongings and attempted to sell it in 2015, not knowing the violin's origin and value. She e-mailed pictures of the violin to master violinmaker Phillip Injeian who identified it and contacted the FBI. The violin was returned to Totenberg's daughters Nina Totenberg, Amy Totenberg and Jill Totenberg in August 2015. The heirs planned to sell the instrument after it had been restored to playing condition. According to Nina Totenberg, "We will make sure it is in the hands of another virtuoso violinist. And once again, the beautiful, brilliant and throaty voice of that long-stilled violin will thrill audiences in concert halls around the world." They have since sold it to an unknown owner, who has lent it to Nathan Meltzer.

== See also ==
- List of Stradivarius instruments
