= Trio for oboe, bassoon and piano =

Trio pour hautbois, basson et piano
- Piano trio by Francis Poulenc
- Poulenc in 1922
- Catalogue: FP 43
- Composed: 1924–26
- Dedication: Manuel de Falla
- Scoring: oboe; bassoon; piano

The Trio pour hautbois, basson et piano (Trio for oboe, bassoon and piano), FP 43, by Francis Poulenc is a three-movement chamber work, composed between 1924 and 1926, and premiered in the latter year.

The trio was well received at its premiere in Paris, with the composer at the piano. It has been performed and recorded frequently since. Critics have praised the work's depth of feeling, noting touches of Mozartian flavour and echoes of other composers' styles. It is regarded as the first major chamber work by Poulenc.

== Background and first performance ==
By 1924 the 25-year-old Poulenc had become fairly well known in France, and to some extent elsewhere. First as a member of Les Six around the start of the decade, and then with his music for the ballet Les biches in 1924, he had established himself as a rising young composer. He had composed several chamber works, including the Sonata for clarinet and bassoon and the Sonata for horn, trumpet and trombone (both 1922), and he began work on a trio for oboe, bassoon and piano in May 1924. (Note: Ideas for the trio had begun to form in his mind as early as 1921.) He was a slow and painstaking composer, and the piece took him two years to complete. Finally he retreated to a hotel in Cannes to isolate himself from family and friends while he finished the work. While there he met Igor Stravinsky who gave him some good advice ("quelques bons conseils") that helped him with the final version of the first movement of the new piece.

Poulenc dedicated the Trio to Manuel de Falla, who was delighted with the work and promised to organise and take part in a performance in Spain as soon as possible. The first performance of the Trio was given at the Salle des Agriculteurs in Paris on 2 May 1926 in a concert at which two other Poulenc works, Napoli and Chansons gaillardes, were also premiered. (Note: Napoli was played by Marcelle Meyer and the chansons were sung by Pierre Bernac.) The work was given again the following day. The players were Roger Lamorlette (oboe), Gustave Dhérin (bassoon) and the composer (piano).

== Music ==
The Trio is in three movements:

1. Presto
2. Andante
3. Rondo

The playing time is about 14 minutes.

Like several of the composers whom Poulenc admired and who influenced him, (Note: Keith Daniel (1982) and Roger Nichols (2020) name Chabrier, Debussy, Satie and Stravinsky.) he was unattracted to traditional sonata form with exposition and development of themes. He preferred what he called an "episodic" style, in which a theme is presented with no development and is followed by a contrasting theme, similarly treated. Nevertheless, many years after the work was written, Poulenc told Claude Rostand:

For those who think I don't care about form, I've no objection to unveiling my secrets here: the first movement follows the plan of a Haydn Allegro, and the final Rondo the shape of the scherzo in Saint-Saëns's Second Piano Concerto. Ravel always recommended this method to me, which he often followed himself.

In a 1998 study of Poulenc, Keith Daniel suggests that this ex post facto analysis by Poulenc was to some extent myth-making – something he was given to. Roger Nichols (2020) concurs and considers the most striking feature of the Trio is its depth of feeling, "especially in the central Andante where, in his favourite B flat major and over a continuously pulsing quaver movement, he gives full rein to his lyrical gifts". Poulenc's biographer Henri Hell comments that several themes recall Mozart, notably the first bars of the Andante.

=== I. Presto ===
Before the presto begins there is a slow (♩ = 76) 15-bar introduction in 4/4 time. First, the piano is heard in a series of bare chords; the bassoon joins in the fourth bar and the oboe in the eighth. The analyst Claude Caré likens the introduction to "a very grand centuries-old portico", Wilfrid Mellers calls it "quasi-Lullian" and both Hell and Nichols find clear echoes of the ceremonious French overture and "the Versailles of Louis XIV". Mellers finds "a Stravinskian starkness" in the introduction, and Hell comments that one can never be sure whether its tone is grave or wry. The presto (minim =104) begins with a classically double-dotted theme for the bassoon in B-flat minor, echoed by the oboe, a semitone higher. A new theme in F minor – which in a traditional sonata form movement might be the second subject – is succeeded by a middle section at half speed, in which Mellers hears the influence of Gluck. The lively opening theme of the presto returns to round off the movement.

=== II. Andante ===
The slow movement, marked "Andante con moto" (♪= 84), is "melodically vocal in idiom and pianistically luxuriant" (Mellers). The opening theme, in B-flat major is a gentle 4/8 tune. There are further echoes of Gluck, with a quotation from his "Dance of the Blessed Spirits". The oboe has a melody of "melancholy grace". The mood becomes less idyllic towards the end of the movement: in Mellers's words, "the delights of pastoral F major [become] shadowed with chromatics", and the final chord is in F minor, a key associated with dirges.

=== III. Rondo ===
The last movement (♩. = 138–144) is marked "très vif" – very lively. The music maintains what Caré calls a frenzy of movement ("frénésie du mouvement"), the piano playing without a single bar's rest, and the "ironic voice" of the oboe contrasting with the bassoon. The impetus continues unflaggingly throughout: Poulenc instructs the players not to slow down in the closing bars ("sans ralentir"). Mellers comments that this finale has affinities with a baroque French gigue, an Offenbach galop, and – "in the tight Stravinskian coda – the acerbity of post-war Paris".

== Reception ==
Le Ménestrel said after the second performance:

A second hearing … allowed us to grasp, even more than at the premiere – and especially during the Andante and the Rondo – a rare delicacy of instrumentation, as well as the subtlety with which the composer has solved problems of form both melodically and from an instrumental or formal point of view, with a feigned negligence that disguises the completeness of his craft. (Note: Une seconde audition … permettait d'y saisir, encore plus qu'à la première, et plus particulièrement au cours de l'Andante et du Rondo,!a rare délicatesse de l'instrumentation, ainsi que la subtilité de certains problèmes de forme résolus par l'auteur: tant mélodiquement que du point de vue instrumental ou formel, toujours une feinte négligence n'y fait que couvrir cette plénitude du métier …)

Hell calls the Trio the composer's first major achievement in the sphere of chamber music, and praises "the perfect coherence of its construction" and its "innate equilibrium". Poulenc was famously self-critical, but looking back in the 1950s he said "I'm rather fond of my Trio because it sounds clear, and it is well balanced." He also noted with satisfaction that the energetic finale was always followed by sustained applause ("applaudissements nourris"). In the last year of his life, after hearing a performance, he wrote that the work "retained an extraordinary fresh force and fantastic individuality". Mellers echoed Poulenc's words, writing that thirty years later the music still retained those qualities; "this music is tonic to ageing minds and senses".

== Recordings ==
Lamorlette, Dhérin and the composer recorded the work for French Columbia in 1928 – one of Poulenc's earliest records. When it was reissued on CD, Robert Layton wrote in Gramophone, "The special tang of the two French wind players in the engaging Trio of 1926 (recorded two years later) is inimitable; a rather thin, papery sound but like everything here very characterful". A later recording (1957) with the composer as pianist features Pierre Pierlot (oboe) and Maurice Allard (bassoon). Reviewing it in 1988, Will Crutchfield wrote in The New York Times, "Unfortunately, the trio was recorded with bad balance and aggressively close miking, but the flavor (tart Mozart pastiche juxtaposed with popular song) comes through".

There have been numerous recordings of the trio by other players. Among them are those by Pascal Rogé (piano), Maurice Bourgue (oboe) and Amaury Wallez (bassoon); James Levine, Hansjörg Schellenberger and Milan Turković; Julius Drake, Nicholas Daniel and Rachel Gough; Éric Le Sage, François Leleux and Gilbert Audin; the Melos Ensemble; the Nash Ensemble; Fibonacci Sequence; and the Poulenc Trio.

== Notes, references and sources ==
=== Sources ===
- Caré, Claude (2013). "La Musique de chambre de Francis Poulenc" (PDF). Francis Poulenc (in French). Association des amis de Francis Poulenc.
- Deeter, Alissa; Robert Peavler (2013). The Mélodies of Francis Poulenc: A Study Guide. Lanham: Scarecrow Press. ISBN 978-0-8108-8415-1.
- Hell, Henri (1959). Francis Poulenc. New York: Grove Press. OCLC 1268174.
- Hell, Henri (1978). Francis Poulenc (in French) (second ed.). Paris: Fayard. ISBN 2-213-00670-9.
- Mellers, Wilfrid (1995). Francis Poulenc. Oxford and New York: Oxford University Press. ISBN 978-0-19-816338-1.
- Nichols, Roger (2020). Poulenc. New Haven: Yale University Press. ISBN 978-0-300-22650-8.
- Poulenc, Francis (2014). Nicolas Southon (ed.). Articles and Interviews – Notes from the Heart. Burlington, US: Ashgate. ISBN 978-1-4094-6622-2.
- Schmidt, Carl B (2001). Entrancing Muse: A Documented Biography of Francis Poulenc. Hillsdale, US: Pendragon Press. ISBN 978-1-57647-026-8.
