= Roman Totenberg =

Polish-American violinist and educator (1911–2012)

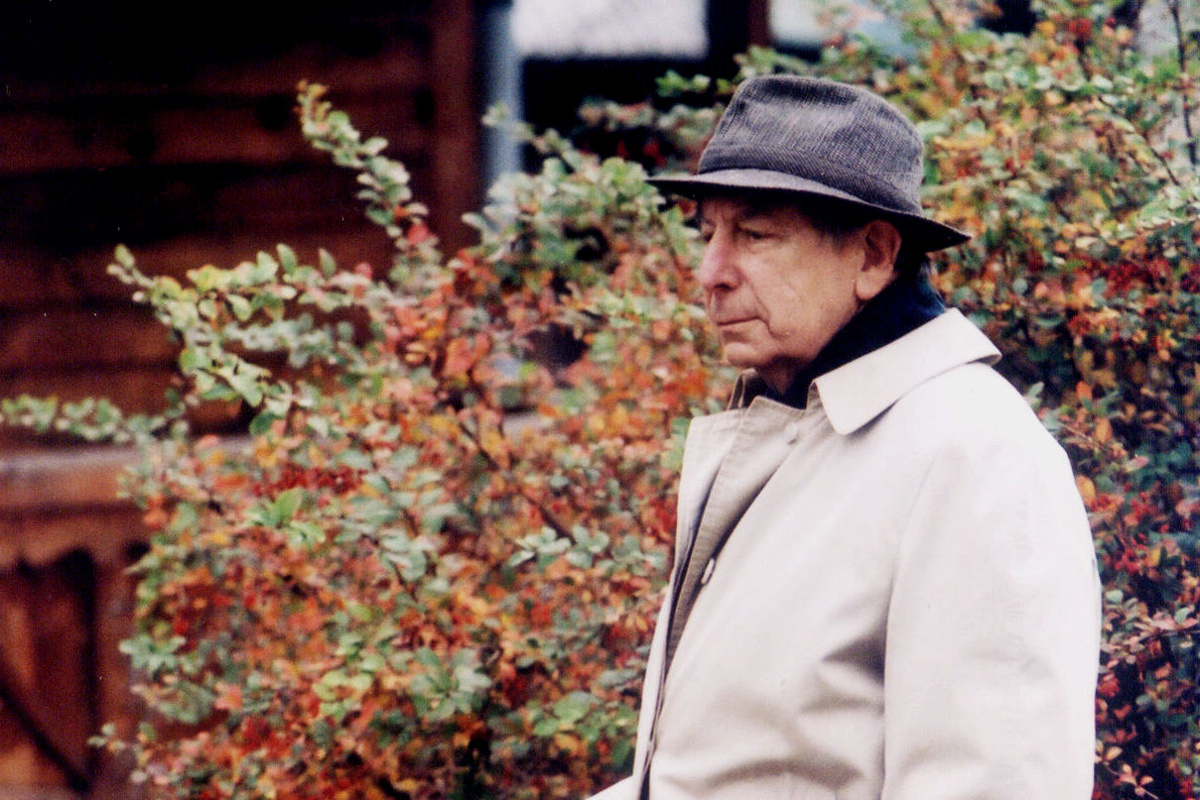

Background information
- Born: 1 January 1911; Łódź, Congress Poland, Russian Empire
- Died: 8 May 2012 (aged 101) Newton, Massachusetts, U.S.
- Genre: Classical music
- Occupations: Violinist, educator
- Instrument: Violin
- Years active: 1923–2012
- Website: http://www.romantotenberg.com

External videos
- ”A Tribute to Roman Totenberg”, Boston University, January 3, 2011
- “BU celebrates Professor Emeritus of Music Roman Totenberg's 90th Birthday”, Boston University, July 13, 2011
- ”From the archives: A stolen Stradivarius”, CBS Sunday Morning

Roman Totenberg (January 1, 1911 – May 8, 2012) was a Polish-American violinist and educator. A child prodigy, he lived in Poland, Moscow, Berlin, and Paris, before formally immigrating to the U.S. in 1938, at age 27. He performed and taught nationally and internationally throughout his life.

One of Totenberg's favorite instruments was the Ames Stradivarius, which was stolen from his office in the Longy School of Music in Cambridge, Massachusetts, after a concert in May 1980. The instrument was recovered and returned to Totenberg's daughters on August 6, 2015.

== Early life ==
Roman Totenberg was born in Łódź, Poland to a Jewish family, the son of Adam (an architect) and Stanisława (Winawer) Totenberg. He spent his early childhood years (1914–1921) in Moscow, where the family moved at the beginning of World War I.

Totenberg was a child prodigy who made his concert debut at the age of eleven with conductor Grzegorz Fitelberg. Returning to Warsaw in 1921, he studied with Mieczyslaw Michalowicz, and made his debut at the age of eleven as soloist with the Warsaw Philharmonic Orchestra. He was also awarded the gold medal at the Warsaw Chopin Conservatory.

By 1929, he had moved to Berlin, where he continued his studies with Carl Flesch. In 1932, he moved to Paris, where he studied with George Enescu and Pierre Monteux. He won the International Mendelssohn Prize.

In 1935, he made his British debut in London and his American debut in Washington, D.C. In 1936, at age 25, he played at the White House for Franklin Delano Roosevelt and Eleanor Roosevelt. In 1938, at age 27, he formally immigrated to the U.S. under the distinguished artist visa program. Many of his family members were murdered in the Holocaust, though he managed to rescue his mother. His sister survived the Warsaw Ghetto, where her own husband had died.

== Professional life ==
Totenberg toured South America with Franz Reizenstein in 1937, and gave joint recitals with Karol Szymanowski. He gave many concerts comprising the complete cycle of Beethoven sonatas and all Bach Brandenburg concertos. His diversified repertoire included more than thirty concerti.

Among the many contemporary works he introduced are the Darius Milhaud Violin Concerto No. 2, the William Schuman Concerto in its final version, 1959, and the Krzysztof Penderecki Capriccio. He also premiered Paul Hindemith's Sonata in E (1935), the Samuel Barber Concerto (new version) and the Bohuslav Martinů Madrigal Sonata, as well as giving the American premiere of Arthur Honegger's Sonata for Solo Violin (1940).

Under the patronage of violinist Yehudi Menuhin, and along with pianist Adolph Baller and cellist Gabor Rejto, Totenberg formed the Alma Trio in 1942–43 at Menuhin's Alma estate in California.

In 1943, he was a soloist with the Naumburg Orchestral Concerts, in the Naumburg Bandshell, Central Park, in the summer series.

Totenberg appeared with numerous American orchestras including the New York Philharmonic, the Boston Symphony, the Cleveland, Minneapolis, Indianapolis, Los Angeles and Washington Symphonies. In Europe he performed with all major orchestras such as the Royal Liverpool Philharmonic Orchestra (3 performances of Szymanowsky Vioin Concerto 1), Berlin Philharmonic, the London Philharmonic. and the Amsterdam Concertgebouw.

He performed under eminent conductors including Leopold Stokowski, Kubelik, Szell, Rodzinski, Grzegorz Fitelberg, Jochum, Rowicki, Krenz, Pierre Monteux, Wit, Steinberg and Vladimir Golschmann. In recital he appeared at the White House, Carnegie Hall, the Library of Congress, the Metropolitan Museum of Art, and in every major American and European city. He was featured with the most important music festivals of the world, notably at Salzburg's Mozarteum, the Aspen Music Festival, Tanglewood Music Center, Kneisel Hall Chamber Music Festival and the Music Academy of the West in Montecito, which he helped found and where he was appointed chairman of the string department in 1947.

== Pedagogy ==
In addition to his concert activities, Totenberg held the position of Professor of Music at Boston University, where he headed the string department from 1961 to 1978. He also taught at the Peabody Conservatory of Music; the Music Academy of the West; the Aspen Music Festival and School; the Mannes College of Music and the Longy School of Music in Cambridge, Massachusetts, which he directed from 1978 to 1985. Notable pupils of his include Yevgeny Kutik, Mira Wang, Leon Botstein, Daniel Han, Rachel Vetter Huang, Na Sun, Ikuko Mizuno and Elizabeth Chang.

== Recognition ==
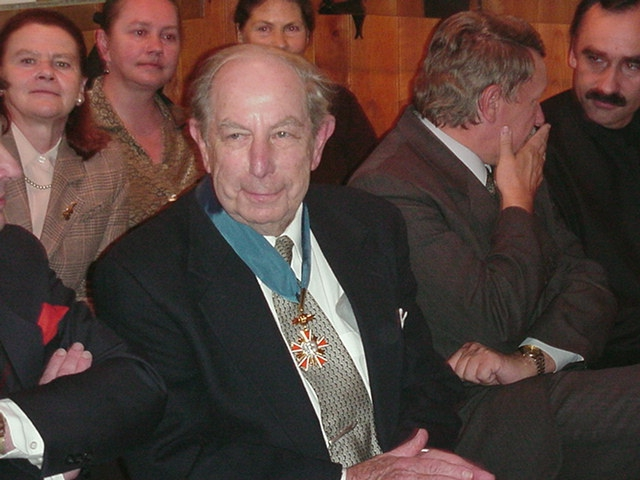
In 2000, he was awarded the Order of Merit of the Republic of Poland.

Roman Totenberg was awarded the Wieniawski Medal of Poland and the Ysaye Medal of Belgium.

In 1983, he was named Artist Teacher of the Year by the American String Teachers Association, and in April 2007, he was honored with the New England String Ensemble's Muses & Mentors Award for his great artistry and significant contributions to string education.

In 1988, he was awarded the highest Medal of Merit by the Polish government for lifelong contributions to Polish society.

== Family ==
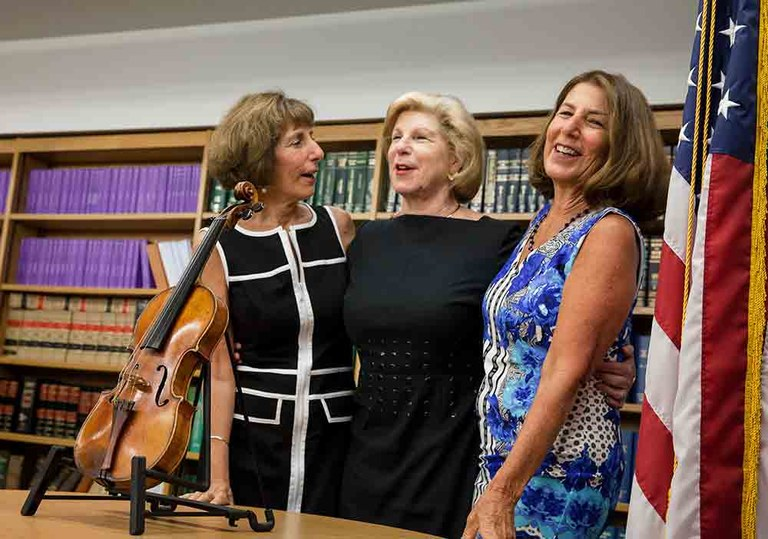
From left, Jill, Nina, and Amy Totenberg celebrate the return of their father’s Stradivarius violin in 2015.

Roman Totenberg's wife, Melanie Frances Eisenberg (1917–1996), was his business manager for 50 years. Roman and Melanie Totenberg were the parents of National Public Radio journalist Nina Totenberg, judge Amy Totenberg, and businesswoman Jill Totenberg. Nina told the story of the theft and belated recovery of her father's Stradivarius in an article for NPR.

== Recording career ==
Totenberg recorded for many labels, including Deutsche Grammophon, Telefunken, Philips, Vanguard, Musical Heritage Society, Heliodor, Remington, Da Camera, Dover, Titanic and VQR.

== Ames Stradivarius ==
One of Totenberg's favorite instruments was the Ames Stradivarius, which he purchased for about $15,000 in 1943 (equivalent to $279,000 in 2025). It was stolen from his office after a concert in May 1980. Totenberg suspected aspiring violinist Philip S. Johnson of the theft, but police at the time did not believe there was enough evidence to issue a search warrant. The instrument was recovered thirty-five years later in 2015, four years after Johnson's death, when his former wife discovered it among his effects and sought to have it appraised.

The recovered instrument was returned to Totenberg's daughters on August 6, 2015, after which it was to be restored to playing condition. The family stated that they planned to sell the instrument after it had been restored. According to Nina Totenberg, "We will make sure it is in the hands of another virtuoso violinist. And once again, the beautiful, brilliant and throaty voice of that long-stilled violin will thrill audiences in concert halls around the world." It has since been sold to an unknown buyer, who subsequently lent it to young American violinist Nathan Meltzer.
