= Elsa Ludewig-Verdehr =

Elsa Ludewig-Verdehr (born April 14, 1936) is an American clarinetist and music educator whose contributions to the Verdehr Trio have resulted in an extensive modern body of work for the clarinet-violin-piano trio medium.

== Biography ==
Born in Charlottesville, Virginia, Elsa Ludewig-Verdehr received Bachelor of Music degrees in both clarinet performance and music education from the Oberlin Conservatory of Music, where she studied with George Waln. She went on to study with the legendary Stanley Hasty at the Eastman School of Music, where she earned both a Performer's Certificate (1958) and the Doctor of Musical Arts degree (1964). While studying at Eastman, Ludewig-Verdehr was an instructor of clarinet from 1959–1962 at Ithaca College Ludewig-Verdehr accepted an Assistant Professor position at Michigan State University in 1962, and has been a Full Professor there since 1977. She received the Distinguished Professor Award from MSU in 1979.

In addition to teaching, Elsa Ludewig-Verdehr has had a prolific career as a soloist and as a member of the pioneering Verdehr Trio. She co-founded the trio in 1972 with other Michigan State faculty members, including her husband and violinist Walter Verdehr, and pianist David Renner. Pianist Gary Kirkpatrick would later become the trio's first regular pianist in 1980. Silvia Roederer, Professor of Piano at Western Michigan State University has been the pianist for the trio since Kirkpatrick. Boasting a list of over 200 new commissioned works from over fifty composers the trio has expanded the breadth of the clarinet trio repertoire to include contemporary works by some of today's most important living composers, such as Karel Husa, Libby Larsen, Gunther Schuller, and Dan Welcher.

As the result of studying with clarinetist Harold Wright while attending the Marlboro Music Festival, Ludewig-Verdehr employs a double-lip embouchure, wherein the upper lip wraps around the top teeth, which are normally in direct contact with the mouthpiece of the clarinet. The effect is to open the mouth and alter the placement of the tongue for a rounder, fuller sound. Other famous clarinetists who have performed using double-lip embouchure include Reginald Kell, Kalmen Opperman, David Weber and Richard Stoltzman.
