= Crystal Records =

- Founded: 1966
- Founder: Peter Christ
- Genre: Chamber music, contemporary classical, classical
- Country of origin: U.S.
- Location: Camas, Washington
- Official website: crystalrecords.com

Crystal Records is an American producer and distributor of classical chamber and solo music recordings. The company was founded in 1966 by Peter George Christ (born 1938) and is incorporated in the state of Washington.

Christ, who has served as president of Crystal Records since its inception, is also an oboist and founding member of the Westwood Wind Quintet (founded 1959). Crystal Records produced vinyl records featuring woodwind and brass musicians, but, eventually expanded to percussion, strings, orchestra, accordion, organ, and vocal.

== Peter Christ ==
Christ has played the oboe in orchestras and in chamber ensembles large and small, and has taught the instrument at a variety of colleges and universities. But, he holds a Bachelor of Arts in Mathematics from UCLA (1960) and a Master of Arts in Mathematics from San Diego State University (1962). He studied music, but has no formal degree in it. His main oboe teacher for six years was Bert Gassman – former principal of the Los Angeles Philharmonic and former student himself of Marcel Tabuteau.

== Wind and brass ==
Crystal's 2011 catalog offers recordings of more than 800 composers, many of the American contemporary genre. According to Fanfare magazine:

The majors may be giving up on recital recordings, which surely are among the least marketable commodities in the business today, but smaller firms, like Crystal, seem to be carrying on admirably.

Crystal Records is one of those unique and specialized labels that, for several decades, has been issuing a compendious catalog of works, both chamber and orchestral, featuring outstanding soloists, primarily but not exclusively players of wind and brass instruments. In this distinctive role, Crystal, under its founder and chief executive Peter Christ, has been filling important gaps in the recorded repertoire that no other label comes close to matching.

== Roster ==
Oboe

- Peter Christ
- John Mack

Clarinet

- Jonathan Cohler
- Larry Combs
- Elsa Ludewig-Verdehr
- Mitchell Lurie

Bassoon

- Arthur Weisberg

Contrabassoon

- Susan Nigro

Saxophone

- Harvey Pittel
- Kenneth Tse

Horn

- John Cerminaro
- Frøydis Ree Wekre

Trumpet

- Armando Ghitalla
- Thomas Stevens

Trombone

- Ralph Sauer

Tuba

- Roger Bobo

Viola

- Carol Rodland

Ensembles

- Verdehr Trio
- Westwood Wind Quintet
