= National Philharmonic =

National Philharmonic may refer to:

- National Philharmonic Orchestra
- National Philharmonic at Strathmore
- National Philharmonic in Warsaw
  - Warsaw National Philharmonic Orchestra
- National Philharmonic of Ukraine
- National Philharmonic of Russia
