= Piotr Gajewski =

Polish conductor

Member of the Rockville City Council
- In office December 2007 – November 2011
- Preceded by: Susan R. Hoffmann
- Succeeded by: Tom Moore

Personal details
- Born: Piotr Marcin Gajewski; January 12, 1959 (age 67) Warsaw, Poland
- Party: Democratic
- Spouse: Tisha
- Education: University of Cincinnati (BM, MM); Catholic University of America (JD)
- Occupation: music conductor, artistic director

Piotr Marcin (Peter) Gajewski (born January 12, 1959) is a Polish-American former politician, conductor, and founder and former music director of the National Philharmonic, currently in residence at the Music Center at Strathmore in North Bethesda, Maryland, in the United States. It is a successor ensemble to the National Chamber Orchestra.

He served on the Rockville City Council in Maryland from 2007 to 2011.

In addition to his appearances with the National Philharmonic, Maestro Gajewski is in much demand as a guest conductor. In recent years, he has appeared with most of the major orchestras in his native Poland, as well as the Buffalo Philharmonic, Royal Liverpool Philharmonic in England, the Karlovy Vary Symphony in the Czech Republic, the Okanagan Symphony in Canada and numerous orchestras in the United States. Gajewski made his opera debut in 1994 with Washington's Summer Opera Theatre.

Born in Warsaw, Poland, Piotr Gajewski began studying piano at the age of four. After emigrating to the United States in 1969, he continued his studies at the New England Conservatory Preparatory Division, Carleton College and the University of Cincinnati, College-Conservatory of Music, where he earned B.M. and M.M. degrees in Orchestral Conducting.

Upon completing his formal education, Gajewski continued refining his conducting skills at the 1983 Tanglewood Music Festival in Massachusetts, where he was awarded a Leonard Bernstein Conducting Fellowship and where his teachers included Leonard Bernstein, Seiji Ozawa, André Previn, Gunther Schuller, Gustav Meier and Maurice Abravanel.

Maestro Gajewski has conducted many important world premieres, including works by Steven Gerber, Joel Hoffman, Andreas Makris, Gerhard Samuel, Burnett Thompson, and Peter Ware. In 2000, his recording with the National Philharmonic (then the National Chamber Orchestra) of Steven Gerber’s Violin Concerto, Cello Concerto, and Serenade for String Orchestra on the Koch International label was released to enthusiastic reviews. Gajewski is also a winner of many prizes and awards, among them a prize at New York's prestigious Leopold Stokowski Conducting Competition.
