= Luis Alvarez Roure =

Puerto Rican realist painter (1976)

Luis Álvarez Roure
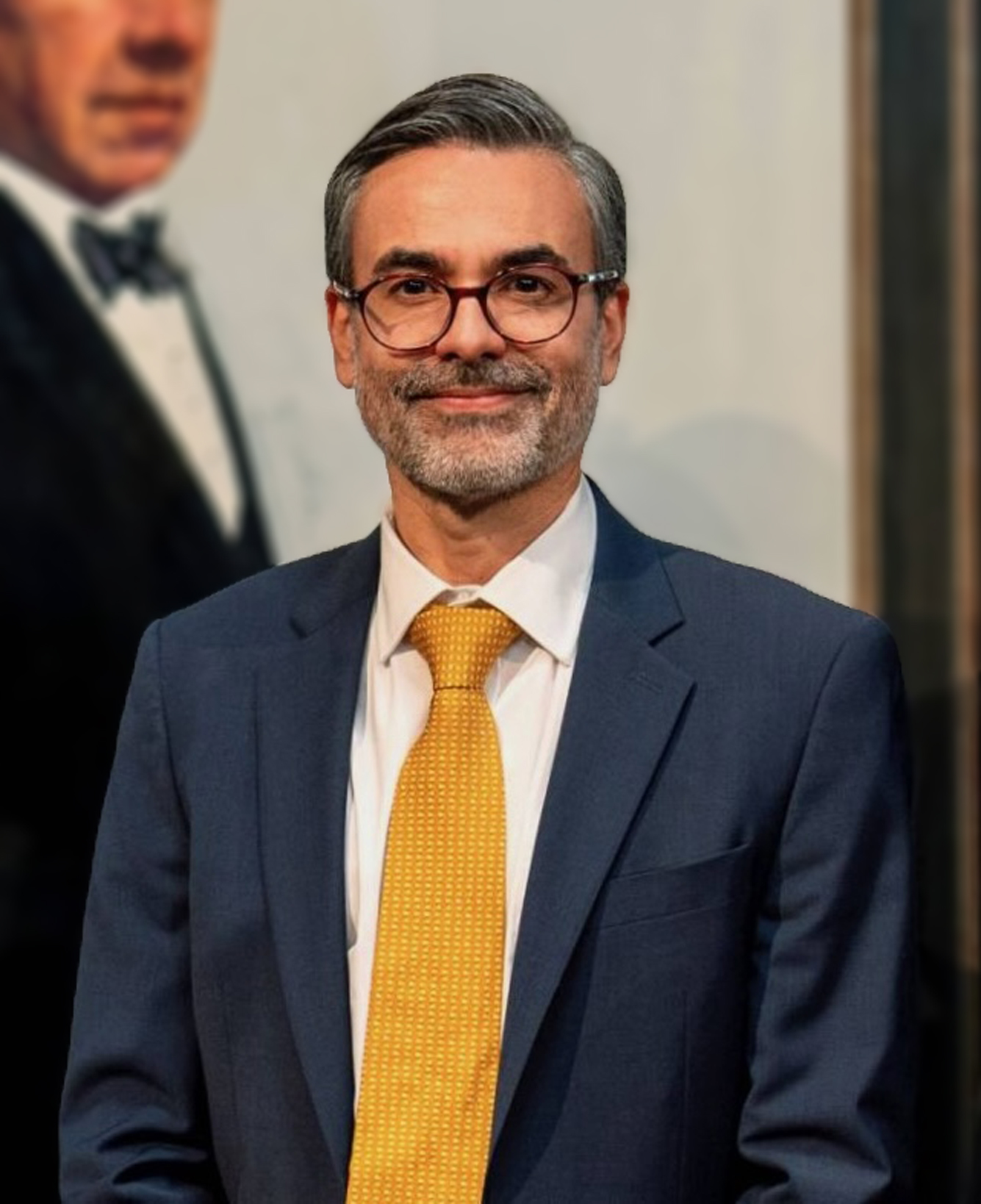
- Luis Alvarez Roure. Princeton University, May 9, 2024. Photo by Matthew Raspanti.
- Born: January 14, 1976 (age 50); Arecibo, Puerto Rico
- Education: Art Students League of New York, City University of New York
- Known for: Painting, Drawing
- Notable work: Portrait of Philip Glass
- Movement: Realism
- Awards: Draper Grand Prize & People's Choice Award (24th International Portrait Competition of the Portrait Society of America). Finalist at the Outwin Boochever Portrait Competition, 2019
- Website: alvarezroure.com

Luis Álvarez Roure (born 1976) is a Puerto Rican realist painter based in New Jersey. He is known for his portrait, figure, and still-life paintings, including portraits of prominent figures in music, the arts, government, and academia. His subjects have included composer Philip Glass, violinist Joshua Bell, former Federal Reserve chairman Paul Volcker, actor and director José Ferrer, percussionist Cándido Camero, Monsignor William Linder, composer Octavio Vázquez and former Governor of Puerto Rico Pedro Pierluisi.

His strengths have been described as "his draftsmanship (...) taken directly from the paintings of past masters" and "the empathy he so evidently feels with his sitters" by Peter Trippi, editor-in-chief of Fine Art Connoisseur Magazine.

== Early life and education ==
Luis Alvarez Roure was born in Arecibo, Puerto Rico. From childhood he demonstrated an interest in drawing and developed his skills largely self-taught. His parents encouraged him to pursue formal art lessons, but he initially declined. He also developed a great interest in music and his father enrolled him in piano lessons. After completing his undergraduate studies in piano performance in Puerto Rico, Roure moved to New York City to continue his studies in piano under the Cuban-American pedagogue Germán Diez Nieto at the City University of New York, where he completed a Master of Arts in Music. While pursuing his musical studies, he enrolled at the Art Students League of New York, where he studied painting, drawing, and anatomy with the American realist painter Nelson Shanks. He studied with Shanks for approximately six years and later described the experience as having a major influence on his approach to painting and a turning point in his artistic development.

== Career and Awards ==
Alvarez Roure's work has been collected by the Smithsonian National Portrait Gallery in Washington D.C., European Museum of Modern Art in Barcelona, Steinway Hall in New York City, Museo de Arte de Puerto Rico, The Players (New York City) , La Fortaleza (Palacio Santa Catalina in San Juan), and the Federal Reserve in Washington D.C.

In 2019, Roure was selected a finalist at the Outwin Boochever Portrait Competition, a triennial competition organized by the Smithsonian’s National Portrait Gallery where his painting Hidden Wounds was one of 46 works exhibited at The Outwin: American Portraiture Today.

In 2022 Alvarez Roure won the Draper Grand Prize and the People’s Choice Award at the 24th International Portrait Competition of the Portrait Society of America, celebrated in Atlanta, Georgia.

In 2024, Princeton University unveiled Roure’s portrait of legendary actor and director José Ferrer, a member of Princeton’s Class of 1933. The portrait was unveiled on May 9, during a ceremony in the Chancellor Green Rotunda.

== Personal life ==
Álvarez Roure is married to Maritza, a pianist and teacher. The couple have two children together.

== Works ==
Philip Glass. Collection of the National Portrait Gallery of the Smithsonian Institution, Washington, D.C.

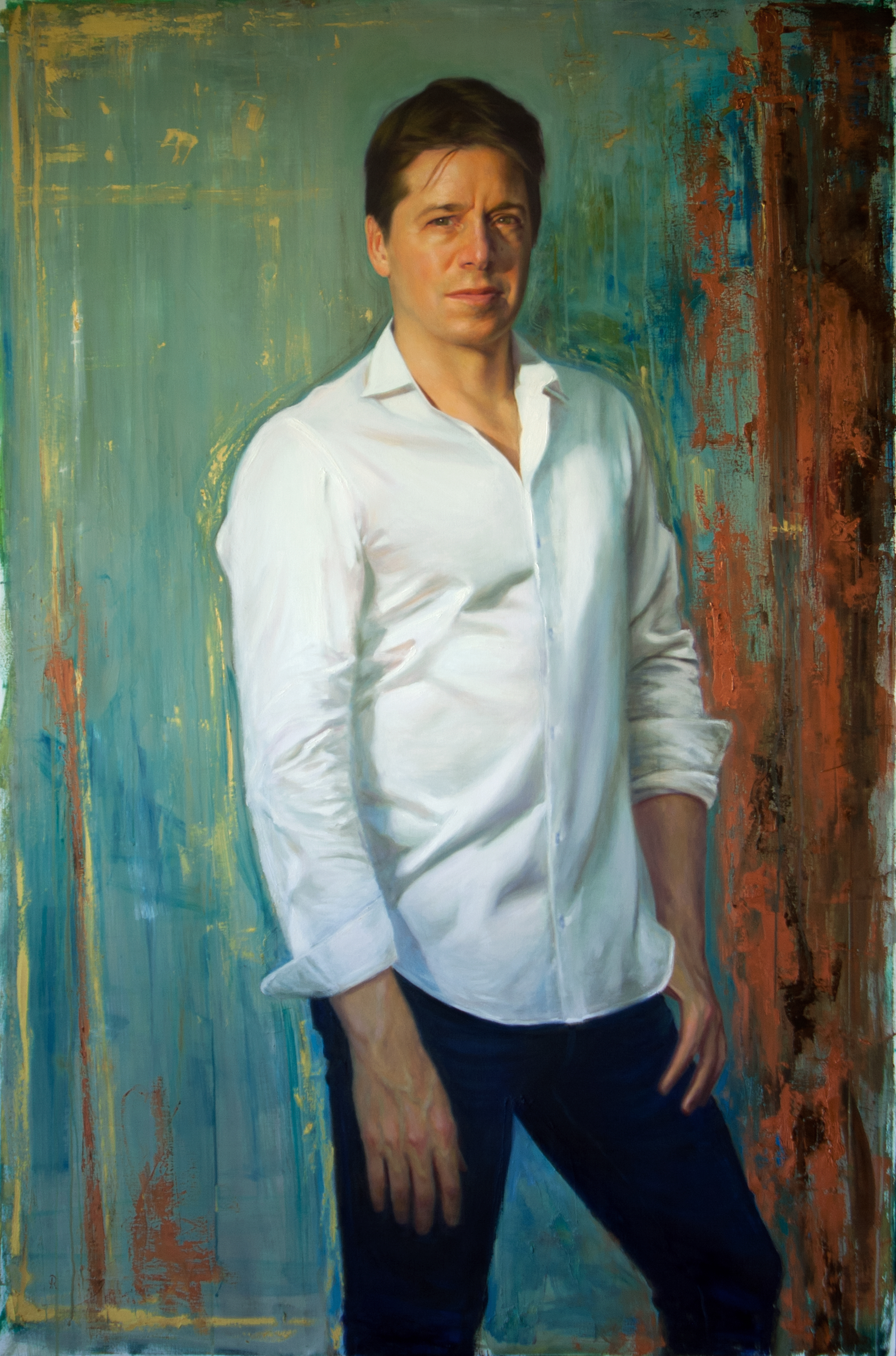
Portrait of violinist Joshua Bell. Collection of the National Portrait Gallery of the Smithsonian Institution, Washington, D.C.

== Sources ==
- Trippi, Peter (2018). "Luis Alvarez Roure: Composing in Paint". Fine Art Connoisseur. November/December issue 2018, p. 80-83.
- Ruiz Kuilan, Gloria. "Boricua se destaca por su talento en el arte." El Nuevo Día, January 4, 2016.
