= Sarah Geraghty =

American judge (born 1974)

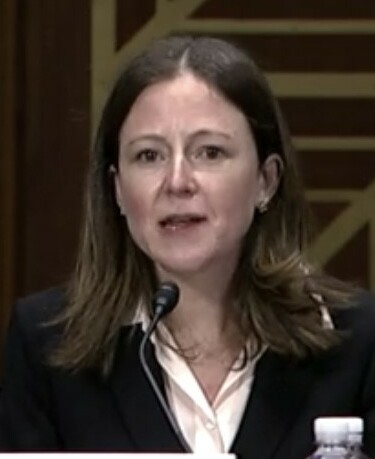

Judge of the United States District Court for the Northern District of Georgia
- Incumbent
- Assumed office April 8, 2022
- Appointed by: Joe Biden
- Preceded by: Amy Totenberg

Personal details
- Born: Sarah Elisabeth Geraghty; 1974 (age 51–52) Chicago, Illinois, U.S.
- Education: Northwestern University (BA); University of Michigan (MSW, JD)

Sarah Elisabeth Geraghty (born 1974) is an American lawyer from Georgia who serves as a United States district judge of the United States District Court for the Northern District of Georgia. She previously was senior counsel for the Southern Center for Human Rights.

== Education ==
Geraghty received her Bachelor of Arts from Northwestern University in 1996, her Master of Social Work from the University of Michigan School of Social Work in 1998 and her Juris Doctor from the University of Michigan Law School in 1999.

== Legal career ==
Geraghty served as a law clerk for Judge James Zagel of the United States District Court for the Northern District of Illinois from 2000 to 2002. From 2002 to 2003, she was a staff attorney with the Office of the Appellate Defender in New York. From 2003 to 2022, she was with the Southern Center for Human Rights in Atlanta and from 2015 to 2020 served as managing attorney of the Impact Litigation Unit.

== Federal judicial service ==
On September 30, 2021, President Joe Biden nominated Geraghty to serve as a United States district judge of the United States District Court for the Northern District of Georgia. President Biden nominated Geraghty to the seat vacated by Judge Amy Totenberg, who assumed senior status on April 3, 2021. On December 1, 2021, a hearing on her nomination was held before the Senate Judiciary Committee. On January 3, 2022, her nomination was returned to the President under Rule XXXI, Paragraph 6 of the United States Senate; she was later renominated the same day. On January 20, 2022, her nomination was reported out of committee by a 12–10 vote. On March 16, 2022, the Senate invoked cloture on her nomination by a 49–46 vote. On March 31, 2022, her nomination was confirmed by a 52–48 vote. She received her judicial commission on April 8, 2022.

=== Notable rulings ===
On August 21, 2023, she blocked a Georgia law banning hormone therapy for transgender minors, but the United States Court of Appeals for the Eleventh Circuit overturned her ruling, which prompted her to allow the ban to be enforced on September 5, 2023.

Legal offices
Preceded by Amy Totenberg	Judge of the United States District Court for the Northern District of Georgia; 2022–present	Incumbent
