= Verdehr Trio =

Verdehr Trio

The Verdehr Trio was a chamber ensemble that worked to promote the clarinet-violin-piano trio repertoire through international commissions, recordings, and performances. The trio featured Walter Verdehr on violin, Elsa Ludewig-Verdehr on clarinet, and Silvia Roederer on piano. The Ludewig-Verdehrs were married in 1971 and founded the trio in 1972 at Michigan State University where it remained in residence. Former pianists include Gary Kirkpatrick. The Verdehr Trio announced its retirement at the end of the 2014–15 season after 43 years.

== Commissions ==
Inspired by existing pieces for violin-clarinet-piano trio by 20th-century composers Bartók (Contrasts (Bartók)), Stravinsky, Milhaud, Khachaturian, Berg, Krenek, Poulenc and Ives, the trio commissioned over 200 new works. To round out their repertoire they discovered or transcribed 18th and 19th century pieces for violin-clarinet-piano. The trio also commissioned trio concertos from composers including Buhr, David, Ott, Skrowaczewski, and Wallace. They commissioned violin-clarinet double concertos from James Niblock, William Wallace, Dinos Constantinides, Paul Chihara, Ian Krouse and Richard Mills.

To make this music available the trio released The Making of a Medium CD Series on Crystal Records and a parallel Video Series including performances, interviews and discussions by the composers as well as a complete performance of the work. Series I includes composers Leslie Bassett, Alan Hovhaness, Karel Husa, Thea Musgrave (Pierrot), Ned Rorem, and Gunther Schuller. Series II, hosted by Peter Schickele, includes trios by Alexander Arutiunian, David Diamond, William Bolcom, Betsy Jolas, Libby Larsen, Philippe Manoury, Gian Carlo Menotti, Peter Sculthorpe, Peter Schickele and Joan Tower. A publishing project was also launched.

== Accomplishments ==
The trio received a Creative Programming Award from Chamber Music America and an Adventuresome Programming Award from ASCAP and Chamber Music America. An article about the Trio appears in the New Grove Dictionary of Music.

Elsa Ludewig-Verdehr is praised for her range of timbre and pitch, especially the clarinet's "chalumeau" or lowest register.

== Other composers commissioned ==
- Nathan Currier
- Douglas Knehans
- Iván Erőd
- David Lipten
- Octavio Vázquez

== Other composers premiered ==
- William Averitt – Tripartita (1988)
- Paul Chihara – Shogun (1987, trio)
- Ge Gan-Ru – Si
- Tomás Marco – Aequatorialis
- Gunther Schuller – A trio setting
- Douglas Knehans – rive
- Douglas Knehans – glow – concerto for violin, clarinet and orchestra
- Octavio Vázquez – trio for violin, clarinet and piano, "Zeitgeist"
- David Lipten – Whorl for violin, clarinet, and piano
