= Poulenc Trio =

American chamber music ensemble

- Also known as: Francis Poulenc Trio
- Origin: New York City; Baltimore
- Genres: Classical; Chamber; Crossover
- Years active: 2003–present
- Labels: Marquis Classics; Delos; Naxos
- Members: Irina Kaplan Lande (piano); Bryan Young (bassoon); Aleh Remezau (oboe)
- Past members: James Austin Smith (oboe); Liang Wang (oboe); Vladimir Lande (oboe)
- Website: poulenctrio.org

Trains of Thought

Studio album by Poulenc Trio
- Released: 16 February 2018
- Venue: University of Maryland, Baltimore County (UMBC)
- Studio: Earl and Darielle Linehan Concert Hall
- Genre: Classical; Chamber
- Length: 58:23
- Label: Delos; Naxos
- Producer: Shao-Ting Sun at AllMusic Alan Wonneberger at AllMusic

Poulenc Trio chronology
Creation	Trains of Thought

Creation

Studio album by Poulenc Trio
- Released: 8 July 2016
- Venue: Emmanuel Episcopal Chapel, Boyce, Virginia
- Studio: Sono Luminus Studios
- Genre: Classical; Chamber
- Length: 70:21
- Label: Delos; Naxos
- Producer: Daniel Shores at AllMusic Dan Merceruio at AllMusic

Poulenc Trio chronology
Poulenc Plays Poulenc	Creation	Trains of Thought

Poulenc Plays Poulenc

Studio album by Poulenc Trio
- Released: 11 August 2009
- Venue: Gordon Center, Baltimore, Maryland
- Studio: Art Music Recording
- Genre: Classical; Chamber
- Length: 55:15
- Label: Marquis Classics
- Producer: Jamey Lamar at AllMusic Alan Wonneberger at AllMusic

Poulenc Trio chronology
Poulenc Plays Poulenc	Creation

The Poulenc Trio is an American chamber music ensemble and oboe–bassoon–piano trio, formed in 2003. The current members are pianist Irina Kaplan Lande, bassoonist Bryan Young and oboist Aleh Remezau. Former members have included New York Philharmonic principal oboist Liang Wang, Orpheus Chamber Orchestra oboist James Austin Smith and Vladimir Lande. Wang joined the group in 2015 after the departure of the founding oboist Vladimir Lande.

== Collaborations ==
The Poulenc Trio has performed with notable collaborators including Grammy-winners Hilary Hahn and David Shifrin, Avery Fisher Grant-recipients Anthony McGill and Alexander Fiterstein, and has recorded with the poet and Guggenheim Fellow, Lia Purpura.

== Recordings ==
The Trio's performances have been broadcast on American public radio programs including NPR's Performance Today and PRX's Wolf Trap Live from Center Stage. The Trio has released recordings on the Marquis Classics and Delos/Naxos labels.

== Repertoire ==
The group is named after the composer Francis Poulenc, whose 1926 Trio for oboe, bassoon, and piano is among the most popular works for the combination of instruments. Other notable examples of works written for the combo include trios by André Previn and Jean Françaix. The Poulenc Trio has also commissioned and performed arrangements of works by Beethoven, Stravinsky, Mikhail Glinka, Rossini, Duke Ellington, Astor Piazzolla, Paquito D'Rivera, Charlie Chaplin and others.

== Commissions ==
The Poulenc Trio regularly commissions works by living composers. The group has premiered 25 new works since its founding, including:

Year	Composer	Title	Notes
2002	Sprinkle, Elam Ray	February	
2003	Benjamin, Thomas	Three Etudes for Trio	
2003	Gerber, Steven	Prelude and Fugue	
2004	Benjamin, Thomas	Scriabin Sits in at Birdland	Poulenc Trio with Hilary Hahn, violin
2006	Ferrero, Lorenzo	DEsCH	Concerto with orchestra
2007	Panariello, Gaetano	Trio Filastrocca	Premiered in Tulsa Chamber Music Society
2008	Panariello, Gaetano	Triple Concerto	Premiered with Bay Atlantic Symphony
2009	Medvedovskaya, Nataliya	First Snow	Poulenc Trio with violin soloist
2009	Nadareishvilli, Zurab	Dialogues and Urban Songs	(Awaiting premiere)
2010	Jakoulov, Jakov	Yiddish Lexicon	Premiered at Symphony Space, New York
2011	Jakoulov, Jakov	Il Giorno Vivente e la Notte Eterna	Concerto with orchestra
2011	Cuong, Viet	Trains of Thought	Animated film premieres in 2017
2012	Jones, Martin David	Trio	(Awaiting premiere)
2012	Vazquez, Octavio	Triptych	Support from New Music USA
2015	Kennison, Kendall	Trilogue	Premiered at Peabody Conservatory
2019	Cuong, Viet	Explain Yourself!	Poulenc Trio with Alexander Fiterstein, clarinet
2019	Jakoulov, Jakov	Perche la minestra si fredda	Celebrating the last words of Leonardo da Vinci
2020	Seo, Juri	Breathing Light	With Hanzhi Wang, accordion; Support from Steven R. Gerber Trust
2021	Seo, Juri	Melodié de Poulenc	Premiere at Strathmore Hall; Support from Steven R. Gerber Trust
