= Octavio Vázquez =

American classical composer

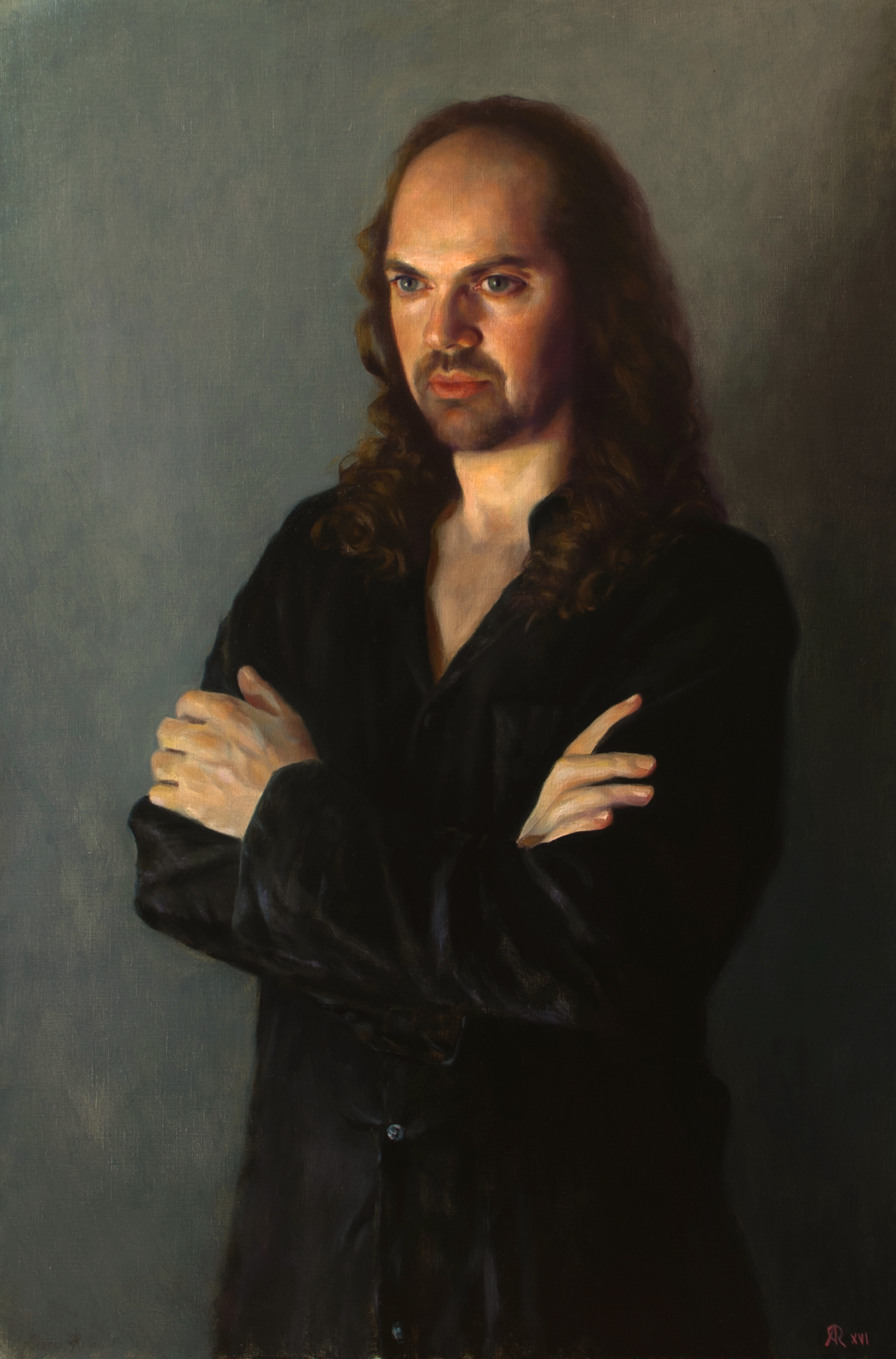
Octavio Vázquez portrait by Luis Alvarez Roure

Octavio Vázquez Rodríguez (born September 10, 1972) is a Galician-American New York-based composer of classical music.

== Biography ==
Born in Santiago de Compostela (Galicia, Spain), Vázquez spontaneously started writing music at age 7. Not knowing how to notate music at that age, he created his own system. At age 12 he became music director at St. Peter's church in Lugo. In 1989 he moved to Madrid, where he studied at the Adolfo Salazar Conservatory and the Madrid Royal Conservatory, taking degrees in piano, collaborative piano, and theory. While in Madrid he also worked as assistant conductor to Oscar Gershensohn and pursued graduate studies in conducting and musicology. After winning the prestigious Barrié de la Maza Foundation Scholarship, he went on to study composition at the Peabody Institute in Baltimore, and afterwards obtained his doctorate from the University of Maryland, College Park, where he was on a full Fellowship. Since 1999 he resides in New York City.

He is primarily interested in the "...emotional impact [of his music] and direct communication with the listener". His music has been described as "...a burning torch for the next century" by Mark Greenfest, of the New Music Connoisseur, and noted for its neo-romantic qualities, as well as its tonal, polytonal and atonal instances. Well known for his contrapuntal technique and use of classical and romantic forms, his doctoral dissertation piece "Hermes" exemplifies the post-modern attributes of his music, amalgamating formal structures of prelude and fugue, theme and variations, and sonata form, while thematically all the material is derived from a 5-note chord, first presented as Ab-C-D#-E-G. Another significant aspect of Vázquez's music is its reflection of his Galician identity. A notable example is "Widows of the Living and of the Dead" (2014), a concerto for gaita (Galician bagpipe) and orchestra. Commissioned by Cristina Pato with support from New Music USA, the piece is "an ode to Galicia's history of women upholding Galician society" following the massive emigration suffered during most of the 19th and 20th centuries, and "dedicated to all women throughout history".

Collaborators include musicians such as Rossen Milanov, Eric Jacobsen, Víctor Pablo Pérez, Dmitri Berlinsky, Ilya and Leonid Finkelshteyn, Johnny Gandelsman, Daniel Gaisford, Eldar Nebolsin, Gintaras Janusevicius, the Flatiron Trio, the Monument Piano Trio, the Verdehr Trio, the Poulenc Trio, Viacheslav Dinerchtein, Julian Gargiulo, and Grammy Award winner Cristina Pato, and artists such as Olivia Kim, Luis Alvarez Roure, and photographer Katya Chilingiri.

Dr. Vázquez teaches at the Eastman School of Music and at Nazareth University, where he directs the Composition Program.

== List of works ==
=== Orchestral ===
Memento (1998), winner of the Andres Gaos International Competition, premiered by the Royal Philharmonic Orchestra of Galicia
Lethe (1999), based on the "Guernica" Piano Trio, premiered by Carlos Kalmar and the Galicia Symphony Orchestra
Hermes (2004), commissioned and premiered by the Royal Philharmonic Orchestra of Galicia and conductor Maximino Zumalave
Styx (2005), commissioned and premiered by the Galicia Symphony Orchestra and conductor Hansjörg Schellenberger
Piano Concerto (2007), commissioned and premiered by the Galicia Symphony Orchestra, with soloist Cristina Pato
Eleusis (2009), commissioned by AEOS and Fundación Autor and premiered by the RTVE Symphony Orchestra conducted by Adrian Leaper
Tropos, Violin Concerto (2010), commissioned by the Xacobeo Classics Festival 2010 and premiered by the Royal Philharmonic Orchestra of Galicia, with soloist Amaury Coeytaux
Ewiges blaues Licht (2011), commissioned and premiered by the Galicia Symphony Orchestra and conductor Víctor Pablo Pérez
Ewiges Licht II (2013), a major revision of the former, commissioned and premiered by the Real Filharmonia de Galicia and conductor Paul Daniel
Penelope (2014), for choir and orchestra, commissioned by the Galician Cultural Council and premiered by Solo Voces, Collegium Compostellanum, and the Real Filharmonia de Galicia conducted by Maximino Zumalave
Elas (2014), for Galician gaita and orchestra, commissioned by Cristina Pato and New Music USA and premiered by Cristina Pato and the Sphinx Symphony Orchestra conducted by Andrew Grams
Widows of the Living and of the Dead (2014), for Galician gaita and orchestra, commissioned by Cristina Pato and New Music USA and premiered by Cristina Pato and the Real Filharmonia de Galicia conducted by Paul Daniel
Gaude (2016), for choir and baroque orchestra, commissioned by Stefan Plewniak & Il Giardino d’Amore
Magnificat (2020), for soprano, organ, choir and orchestra, commissioned by the Church of St. Thomas the Apostle of West Hartford, CT with support from the Marjorie Jolidon Fund of the Greater Hartford chapter of the American Guild of Organists
Migrant (2021), for violin and string orchestra, commissioned by the Society for New Music with support from the National Endowment for the Arts
Māyā (Illusions) (2022), commissioned by the Royal Philharmonic Orchestra of Galicia

=== Chamber ===
Sonata for Violin and Piano No. 1 (1990)
Sonata for Viola and Piano No. 1 (1992)
Sonata for Violin and Piano No. 2 (1993)
Trio for Clarinet, Cello and Piano (1994)
Suite for Bassoon and Piano (1996)
Septet (1996)
String Quartet No. 3 (1997), premiered at Merkin Hall
Sonata for Viola and Piano No. 2 (2002), diploma at the Prokofiev International Competition, premiered at Carnegie Hall in 2003
Galician Folk Dances (2003), for violin and piano, commissioned by the COAHSI
Trio for Flute, Viola and Cello (2003), premiered at Carnegie Hall in 2003
Trio for Violin, Cello and Piano, 'Guernica' (1999, 2006) commissioned by the Guernica Project Inc. and premiered by the Flatiron Trio
Sonata for Clarinet and Piano (2009), commissioned and premiered by Enrique Pérez Piquer and the Via Stellae Festival 2010
MusicScapes (2011), commissioned by Katya Chilingiri
Balkanika (2011), commissioned with support from the Secretary of Culture of Spain
NGC 6611 (2012), Honorable Mention in Hilary Hahn's "In 27 Pieces: The Hilary Hahn Encores' Contest"
Trio for Oboe, Bassoon and Piano (2012), commissioned and premiered by the Poulenc Trio with support from New Music USA
Trio for Violin, Clarinet and Piano (2012), commissioned and premiered by the Verdehr Trio and Michigan State University
Three Departures for alto sax and piano (2016), commissioned by the New York chapter of the Music Teachers National Association
Sonata for Alto Saxophone and Piano (2016)
Pentagrammon for wind quintet (2016), commissioned and premiered by the Airas Ensemble with support from Nazareth University
Winterzug for horn, tuba and piano (2016), commissioned and premiered by the Eastern Standard Trio
What A Circus for horn, tuba and piano (2017), commissioned by the Eastern Standard Trio with support from the Meir Rimon Commissioning Assistance Program of the International Horn Society
Alchemical Birds for reed quintet (2018), commissioned by the I-Park Foundation 2018 Composers + Musicians Collaborative Residency for the Akropolis Reed Quintet
Fierce for cello and piano (2018), commissioned by Tribeca New Music
Meus Benqueridos Irmáns / My Beloved Brethren for violin, gaita and piano (2019), commissioned by Cristina Pato
Piano Quintet (2021), commissioned by the Aspen Music Festival for the American String Quartet
Sonata for Cello and Piano, “The Fool” (2023), commissioned by Kathleen Murphy Kemp for cellist Annie Jacobs-Perkins
“North Star” for string quartet (2024), commissioned by Robin Strongin and premiered by the American String Quartet

=== Solo ===
Sonatina for Piano (1994)
Prelude and Fugue for Guitar (1999)
Nineteen Preludes for Piano (2001)
Galician Folk Dances for piano (2003)
Variations on a Theme by Mozart for violin (2008)
Nostos for Guitar (2009), commissioned by Adam Levin and the Fulbright Commission
Percée for Violin (2011), commissioned by Roberto Alonso Trillo
Double I for Violin (2015), commissioned by Roberto Alonso Trillo
Three Galician Pieces for piano (2015), first prize in the Galician Folk Songs international competition
Galician Fancy for piano (2019), written for pianist and activist Isabel Perez Dobarro

=== Vocal ===
Three Cantigas (1994), to poems by Airas Nunes, Garcia de Andrade, Eanes de Cotom
Semente for Mixed Choir (1995), poem by Emilio Pita (from Jacobusland)
But a Breath for Mixed Choir (1995), first prize in the Kromatika International Competition
Tempestad, Amanece, for voice and piano trio (2002), poems by Ilia Galán
Lieder to Poems by Goethe, for bass, bass clarinet and piano (2005)
Lieder to Poems by Rosalía de Castro, for voice and piano (2013)
Penelope (2014), for choir and orchestra, commissioned by the Galician Cultural Council and premiered by Solo Voces, Collegium Compostellanum, and the Real Filharmonia de Galicia conducted by Maximino Zumalave
Two Songs to Poems by Neira Vilas, for voice and piano (2015)
Gaude (2016), for choir and baroque orchestra, commissioned by Stefan Plewniak & Il Giardino d’Amore
About Light (2019), for choir, commissioned, premiered and recorded by Cantabile Choir

== Recordings ==
- Widows of the Living and of the Dead, Cristina Pato, Paul Daniel, Royal Galician Philharmonic, 2021 ODRADEK
- Zeitgeist, Verdehr Trio, 2021 Blue Griffin
- Alchemical Birds, Akropolis Reed Quintet, Birds EP, 2020 AKROPOLIS
- Nostos, Adam Levin, NAXOS
- Galician Folk Dances, Three Galician Pieces, Javier Otero Neira, Landra Music
- Songs to Poems by Rosalia, Joaquin Pixan, Andante Productions
- Soas, Cristina Pato & Rosa Cedron, Fol Music
- Percee, Roberto Alonso Trillo, Ouvirmos
- Clarinet Sonata, Leiva & Amoedo, Ouvirmos
- Prelude and Fugue, Michael Nicolella: Ten Years Passed, Gale Recordings
- 'Guernica' Trio, Flatiron Trio, Bohemia Music
- Trio for oboe, bassoon and piano, Poulenc Trio, 2016, Delos (Naxos)

== Notes ==
1. MundoClasico.com (2007)
2. Nazareth University (2014)
