= Nina Totenberg =

American journalist (born 1944)

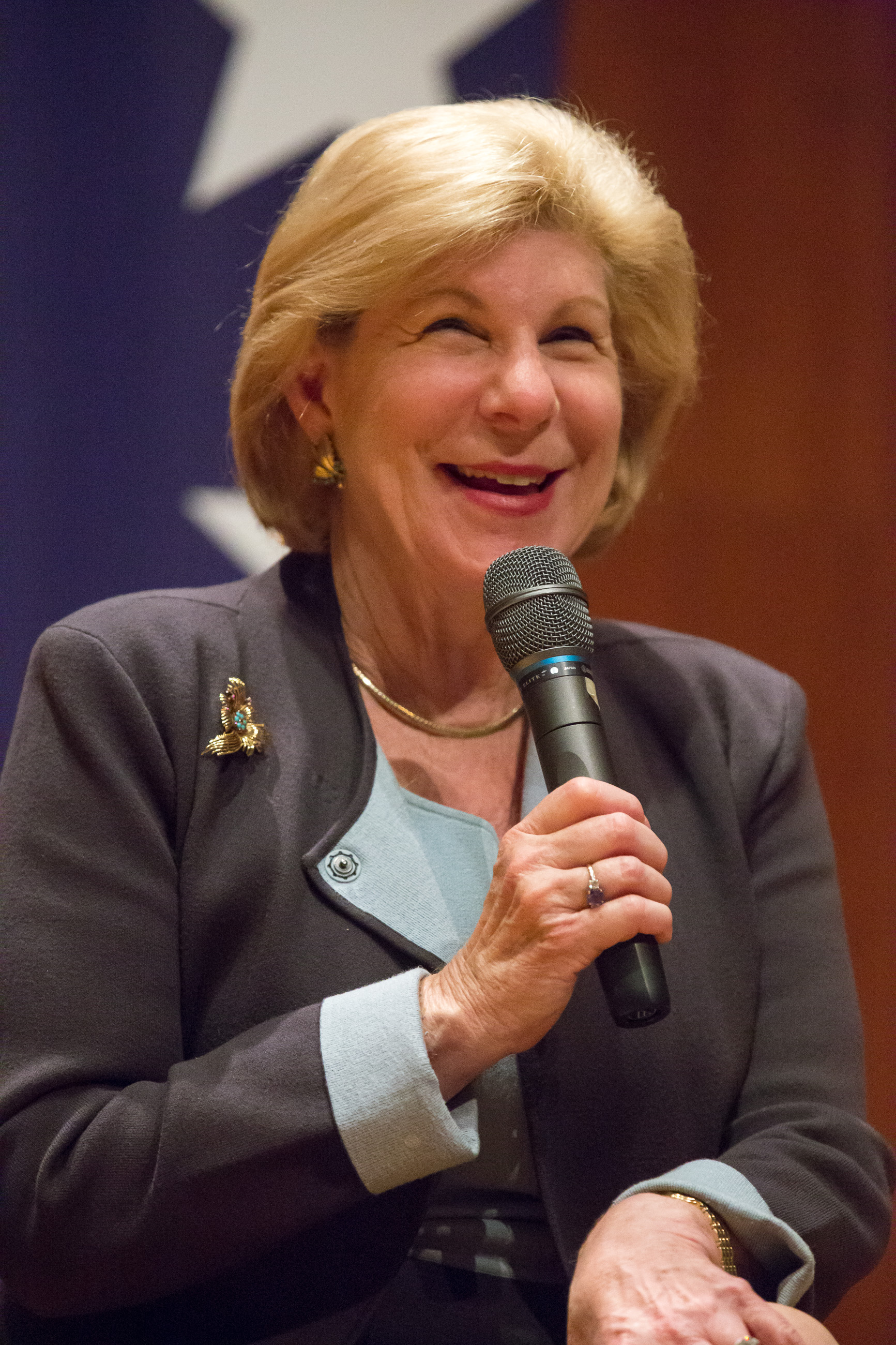
- Totenberg in 2015
- Born: January 14, 1944 (age 82); New York City, New York, U.S.
- Education: Boston University (attended)
- Spouses: Floyd K. Haskell (m. 1979; died 1998); David Reines (m. 2000)
- Relatives: Roman Totenberg (father); Amy Totenberg (sister)

Nina Totenberg (born January 14, 1944) is an American legal affairs correspondent for National Public Radio (NPR) focusing primarily on the Supreme Court of the United States. Her reports air regularly on NPR's news magazines All Things Considered, Morning Edition, and Weekend Edition. From 1992 to 2013, she was also a panelist on the syndicated TV political commentary show Inside Washington.

She is considered one of NPR's "Founding Mothers," along with Susan Stamberg, Linda Wertheimer, and Cokie Roberts. Newsweek magazine called her "the creme de la creme" of NPR, and Vanity Fair refers to her as "Queen of the Leaks." She has won many broadcast journalism awards for both her explanatory pieces and her scoops.

Among her scoops was her groundbreaking report of sexual harassment allegations made against Clarence Thomas by University of Oklahoma law professor Anita Hill, leading the Senate Judiciary Committee to reopen Thomas's Supreme Court confirmation hearings. Previously, in 1986, she broke the story that Supreme Court nominee Douglas H. Ginsburg had smoked marijuana, leading Ginsburg to withdraw his name. In 1977, she reported on secret Supreme Court deliberations relating to the Watergate scandal.

== Early life and education ==
Totenberg was born in Manhattan, New York City, the eldest daughter of Melanie Francis (Eisenberg), a real estate broker, and violinist Roman Totenberg. Her father was a Polish Jewish immigrant, who lost many family members in the Holocaust. Her mother was of German Jewish and Polish Jewish descent, from an upper-class family that had lived in San Francisco and New York City. Totenberg grew up in Scarsdale, New York.

Totenberg enrolled in Boston University in 1962, majoring in journalism, but dropped out less than three years later because, in her words, she "wasn’t doing brilliantly."

== Career ==
Soon after dropping out of college, Totenberg began her journalism career at the Boston Record American, where she worked on the Women's Page and learned breaking news journalism skills by volunteering in the news department. She moved on to the Peabody Times in Peabody, Massachusetts and then Roll Call in Washington, D.C.

=== National Observer ===
At the National Observer, Totenberg began covering legal affairs. In 1971, she broke a story about a secret list of candidates President Richard Nixon was considering for the Supreme Court. All the candidates were later rejected as unqualified by the American Bar Association, and none were nominated.

After Totenberg wrote a National Observer profile of FBI director J. Edgar Hoover, Hoover wrote a long letter to the paper's editor demanding she be fired. Instead, the editor printed the letter in the Observer along with a rebuttal of Hoover's complaints regarding the article.

==== Fired for plagiarism ====
In 1972, Totenberg was fired from the National Observer for plagiarism in a profile she wrote on incoming Speaker Tip O'Neill, which included, without attribution, quotes from members of Congress that had previously appeared in The Washington Post. Totenberg has said that the dismissal also related to her rebuffing of sexual overtures from an editor. Many of Totenberg's colleagues have defended her, noting that the use of previously reported quotes was a common journalistic practice in the 1970s.

In 1995, Totenberg told the Columbia Journalism Review, "I have a strong feeling that a young reporter is entitled to one mistake and to have the holy bejeezus scared out of her to never do it again."

=== New Times ===
She next worked for the New York City-based news magazine New Times. At that publication, she wrote a celebrated article called "The Ten Dumbest Members of Congress", prompting the senator at the top of the list, William L. Scott, to call a press conference to deny that he was the "dumbest member of Congress."

=== National Public Radio ===
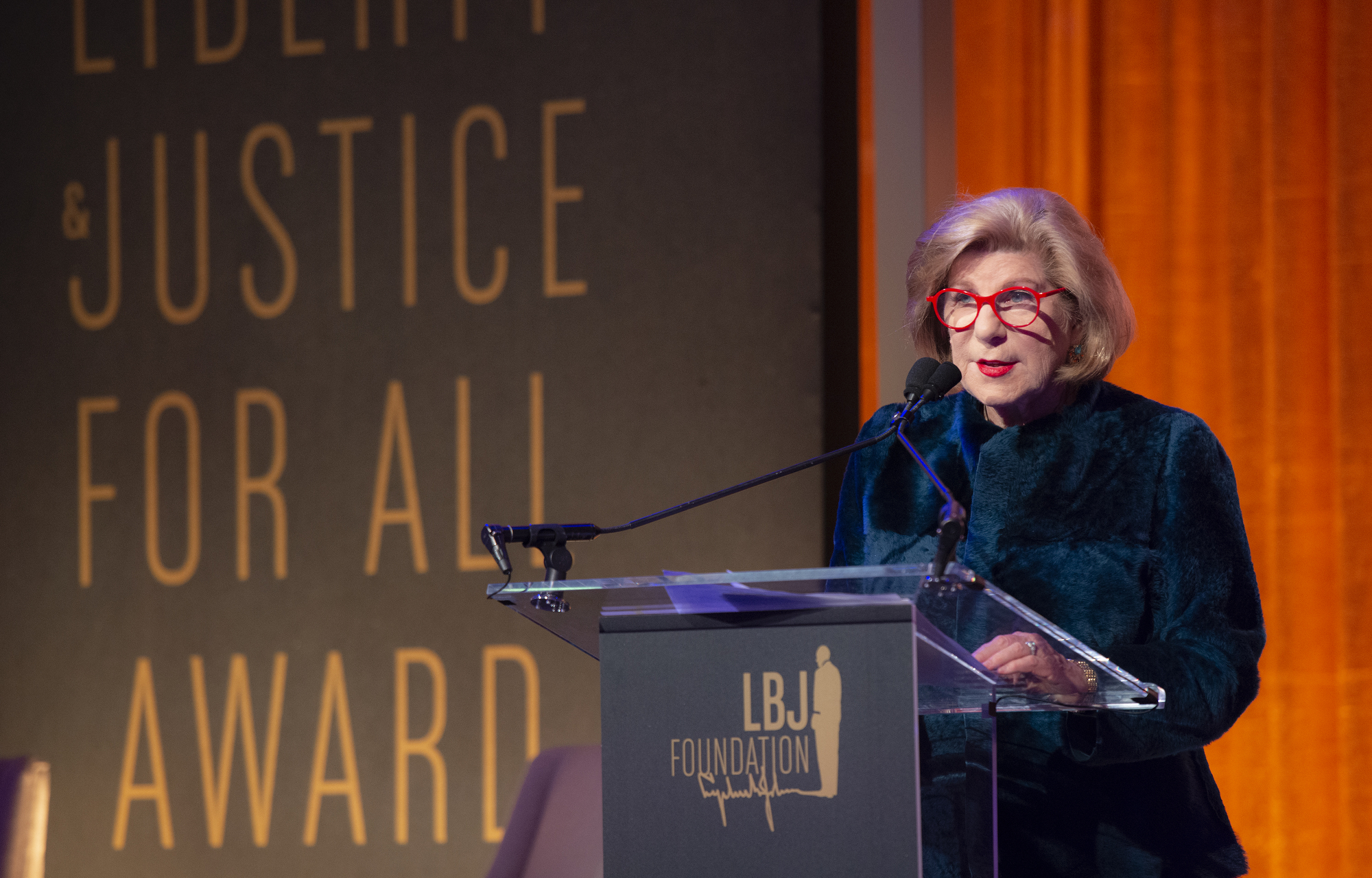
Totenberg in January 2020

In 1975, Nina Totenberg was hired by Bob Zelnick to work at National Public Radio and has been there since.

In 1977, Totenberg broke a story about the Supreme Court appeal of three men who had been convicted in the Watergate scandal: H.R. Haldeman, John N. Mitchell, and John D. Ehrlichman. Totenberg revealed the results of their secret 5–3 vote against reviewing the case and that the three dissenters were appointees of President Richard Nixon. Nixon had resigned three years earlier in the wake of Watergate. Totenberg also revealed that Nixon-appointed Chief Justice Warren Burger delayed announcing the vote results, hoping to sway his fellow justices. Her reporting of private Supreme Court deliberations was a novel development in Supreme Court reporting and led to speculation about who on the Court gave her the information.

In 1986, Totenberg broke the story that William H. Rehnquist, who was nominated for Chief Justice of the United States by Ronald Reagan, had written a memo in 1970 opposing the Equal Rights Amendment, in which he said that the amendment would "hasten the dissolution of the family" and that it would "virtually abolish all legal distinctions between men and women." The memo was written when Rehnquist was head of the Justice Department's Office of Legal Counsel in the Nixon Administration.

Totenberg broke the story that Judge Douglas H. Ginsburg, who had been nominated to the Supreme Court by Ronald Reagan, had smoked marijuana "on a few occasions" during his student days in the 1960s and while an assistant professor at Harvard Law School in the 1970s, something that did not appear in Ginsburg's FBI background check. The revelations resulted in Ginsburg's withdrawing his name from consideration. Totenberg was awarded the 1988 Alfred I. duPont-Columbia University Silver Baton award for outstanding broadcast journalism for the story.

In 1991, a few days before a confirmation vote was scheduled for Republican George H. W. Bush's Supreme Court nominee Clarence Thomas, Totenberg disclosed allegations of sexual harassment lodged against Thomas by University of Oklahoma law professor Anita Hill. Totenberg's report about Hill's allegations led the Senate Judiciary Committee to re-open Thomas's Supreme Court confirmation hearings to consider Hill's charges.

Totenberg was criticized by many of Thomas' supporters, including Republican senators on the Judiciary Committee. The Senate appointed special counsel Peter E. Fleming Jr. to investigate the leak. Totenberg and Newsday's Timothy Phelps were subpoenaed by Fleming but refused to answer questions about their confidential sources.

Totenberg was confronted by one Thomas supporter, Republican Senator Alan K. Simpson, during and after the taping of an episode of Nightline. On the show, Simpson criticized Totenberg, saying, "What politicians get tired of is bias in reporters. Let's not pretend your reporting is objective here. That would be absurd." After Totenberg defended her reporting and objectivity on the show, Simpson followed her out of the studio and continued to criticize her, even holding open the door of her limousine so she could not leave. "He was in a complete rage. He was out of control," Totenberg said. Accounts differ on Totenberg's response, but she used what she called "choice epithets" and said: "I think I told him to shut the fuck up."

Following Totenberg's allegation to The Washington Post's Howard Kurtz that she had been sexually harassed at the National Observer, Al Hunt of The Wall Street Journal brought up the plagiarism incident in a column about media coverage of and responses to the Thomas hearings. Some observers connected Hunt's rehashing of a then nearly 20-year-old incident to the stance of the Journal, whose conservative editorial pages had "editorially championed" Thomas and had previously criticized Totenberg, but Hunt denied any ideological motivation.

=== Awards ===
For the report and NPR's gavel-to-gavel coverage, Totenberg received the George Foster Peabody Award. The same year, she won the George Polk Award for excellence in journalism and the Joan S. Barone Award for excellence in Washington-based national affairs/public policy reporting (the latter also in part for her coverage of the retirement of Justice Thurgood Marshall). The American Library Association presented her with its James Madison Award, given to those who "championed, protected, and promoted public access to government information and the public's right to know".

She earned the Sigma Delta Chi Award from the Society of Professional Journalists for investigative reporting.

== Distinction and acclaim ==
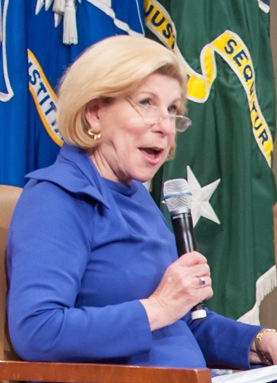
Totenberg in March 2013

In addition to awards mentioned above, and among her other awards, Totenberg has been honored seven times by the American Bar Association for excellence in legal reporting and won the first-ever Toni House award presented by the American Judicature Society for a career body of work, and was the first radio journalist to be honored by the National Press Foundation as Broadcaster of the Year. In 2024, Totenberg was awarded the Goldsmith Career Award for Excellence in Journalism by the Shorenstein Center on Media, Politics and Public Policy at the Harvard Kennedy School.

She has written for the Harvard Law Review (including tributes to Justices William J. Brennan, Jr. and Lewis Powell when they retired); The New York Times Magazine, New York magazine; the Christian Science Monitor; and numerous other legal and general circulation publications. She also contributed to the Jewish Women's Archive's online exhibit Jewish Women and the Feminist Revolution with regard to her reporting on Anita Hill's allegations against Clarence Thomas. In the 1990s Totenberg was a regular contributor to ABC's Nightline.

Totenberg played the part of an election anchor in the film The Distinguished Gentleman (1992) and also appeared briefly as herself in the Kevin Kline film Dave (1993). Her image has also been used for an item produced for NPR called "The Nina Totin' Bag", a play on her name and the stereotypical tote bag offered as a thank-you gift for donating to a public broadcasting pledge drive.

== Controversies and criticism ==
=== Conflicts of interest and relationships with sources ===
Totenberg has made friends with several politicians and lawyers in national politics, and her personal connections have generated criticism.

In 2000, journalists expressed concern that Justice Ruth Bader Ginsburg's officiating at Totenberg's wedding could be seen as a conflict of interest. Totenberg did not consider it a conflict of interest since her friendship with Ginsberg was established before Ginsburg was nominated to the Supreme Court.

In 2020, just after the death of Justice Ruth Bader Ginsburg, Totenberg disclosed additional details of the 48-year-long friendship she had with Ginsburg in an obituary. The deeply personal nature of their friendship was not widely known to NPR audiences until Totenberg released the obituary. Subsequently, Totenberg received criticism for not disclosing the friendship. NPR's Public editor called Totenberg's undisclosed friendship with Ginsburg a conflict of interest (given Totenberg's role as Legal Affairs correspondent) that implies "one set of standards for senior, elite journalists, and another set of standards for the rest of the staff".

Likewise, Totenberg claimed a long friendship with Justice Antonin Scalia after he died in 2016, and she has persistently worked to develop tight friendships with other justices and elite lawyers.

Totenberg was also criticized for hugging her friend Lani Guinier during a press conference announcing Guinier's nomination by Bill Clinton to the post of Assistant Attorney General for Civil Rights.

Early in her career, there were allegations that Totenberg obtained her scoops by untoward means, which Bill Kovach, editor of The New York Times, attributed to sexism.

=== Allegations of partisanship ===
The Wall Street Journal editorialist Paul Gigot wrote in 1991 that Totenberg exhibits partisanship in her reporting. Washington Post reporter Thomas Edsall said in 1995 that she was cited as an example of liberal bias in public broadcasting due to her reporting on two controversial Supreme Court nominations.

=== AIDS comment ===
In 1995, responding to conservative Senator Jesse Helms (R-N.C.), who characterized AIDS as a "disease transmitted by people deliberately engaging in unnatural acts" in his effort to cut government spending to combat it, Totenberg said: "I think he ought to be worried about what's going on in the good Lord's mind, because if there's retributive justice, he'll get AIDS from a transfusion or one of his grandchildren will." On the same show, conservative columnists Charles Krauthammer and Tony Snow also criticized Helms, with Krauthammer calling Helms's remarks "bigoted and cruel" and Snow accusing him of "hypocrisy". Totenberg subsequently expressed regret for her choice of words, saying: "It was a stupid remark. I'll pay for it for the rest of my life." Following his October 2010 firing from NPR for comments he made on Fox News, Juan Williams said the failure of NPR to discipline her for these statements was an example of NPR's double standard, a charge echoed by Fox News and conservative pundits.

=== COVID-19 coverage ===
In January 2022, Totenberg received criticism for reporting on the impact of COVID-19 pandemic related to mask-wearing at the Supreme Court. On January 18, 2022, an article by Totenberg claimed that Chief Justice John Roberts "in some form" asked that the justices wear masks during oral arguments, partially due to Justice Sonia Sotomayor's diabetes-related health concerns. Totenberg reported that Justice Neil Gorsuch (the Justice who sits next to Sotomayor on the bench) was the only Justice who refused to wear a mask, forcing Justice Sotomayor to join oral arguments virtually despite the other eight justices hearing oral arguments in person. A day after Totenberg's piece, Justices Gorsuch and Sotomayor issued a rare joint statement stating that Totenberg's story "surprised us" and Chief Justice Roberts issued a statement denying he had asked any Justices to wear a mask. Totenberg stood by her claim, citing that she did not know exactly how the Chief Justice asked the other justices to mask-up, but he did suggest "in some form" that they should wear masks. In response, NPR's public editor called for Totenberg to issue a clarification, saying that Totenberg should have been more careful in her choice of the word "asked", and that other words would have better described to the audience the subtlety with which executive messages are conveyed in the Supreme Court. The original article by Totenberg was updated on January 22 to reflect the clarification.

=== Samuel Alito retirement ===
In 2026, Totenberg falsely reported the retirement of Supreme Court Justice Samuel Alito. Her article was live on NPR's website for about five minutes, and was replaced by an editor's note retracting the story.

Totenberg was interviewed on NPR's All Things Considered the same day. She said she was outside the courtroom during the Court's final session of the year, and was told that retirement announcements were being made; assuming it was Alito, she contacted NPR's executive editor, Krishnadev Calamur, who worked to publish the article. She called the misfire "the worst professional mistake of my more than 50 years in journalism", and read aloud from a letter she wrote apologizing to Alito.

NPR published the story without additional confirmation. Brian Stelter surmised that the sequence of events may hint that Totenberg, who has been previously effective at procuring Court information, may have advance knowledge of Alito's intent to retire.

== Personal life ==
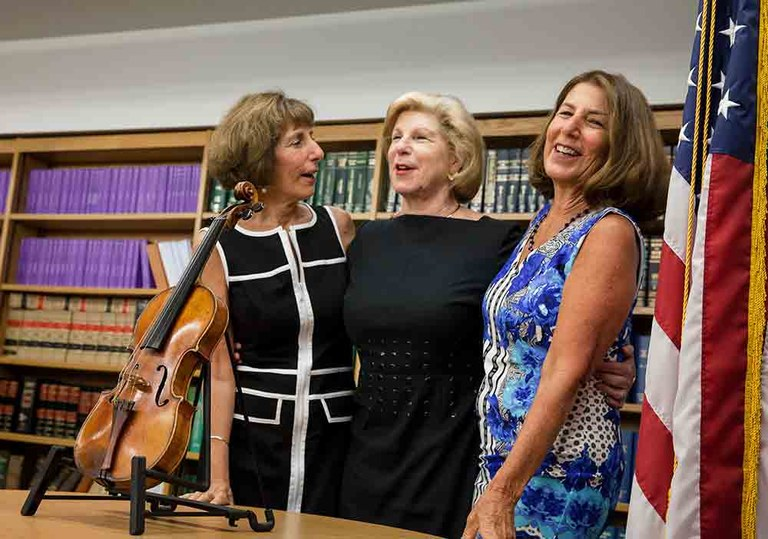
Left to right: Sisters Jill Totenberg, Nina, and Amy Totenberg celebrate the return of their father's Ames Stradivarius violin in August 2015.

Totenberg is the widow of U.S. Senator Floyd Haskell (D-Colorado), whom she married in 1979.

In 2000, she married H. David Reines, a trauma surgeon and vice chairman of surgery at Inova Fairfax Hospital in Falls Church, Virginia; U.S. Supreme Court justice Ruth Bader Ginsburg presided over the wedding. On their honeymoon, he treated her for severe injuries after she was struck by a boat propeller while swimming.

In March 2010, Totenberg's sister Amy Totenberg was nominated by President Barack Obama to the U.S. District Court in Atlanta. Amy Totenberg was confirmed the next year. Another sister, Jill Totenberg, is a businesswoman married to Brian Foreman.

On August 6, 2015, the Ames Stradivarius violin, which had been stolen from her father in Cambridge, Massachusetts, 35 years earlier, in 1980, was recovered by the FBI after a woman sought an appraisal for it in New York City. According to The Times of Israel, the violin was made in Italy in 1734 "and is one of roughly 550 Stradivarius instruments known to exist. They can fetch millions of dollars at auction, including a record $15.9 million in 2011."

== Publications ==
- Totenberg, Nina (2022). Dinners with Ruth: A Memoir on the Power of Friendships. New York: Simon & Schuster. ISBN 9781982188085. OCLC 1299301214.
- Rehnquist, William H.; J. Harvie Wilkinson; T. S. Ellis; John C. Jeffries; Nina Totenberg; Christina B. Whitman (January 1999). "In Memoriam: Lewis F. Powell, Jr". Harvard Law Review. 112 (3): 602–606. JSTOR 1342371.
- Totenberg, Nina (1994). "Harry A. Blackmun: The Conscientious Conscience". American University Law Review. 43: 745.
- Marshall, Thurgood; Abner J. Mikva; Richard A. Posner; Norman Dorsen; Frank Michelman; Nina Totenberg (November 1990). "A Tribute to Justice William J. Brennan, Jr". Harvard Law Review. 104 (1): 33–39. JSTOR 1341502.
