= Philip S. Johnson =

American violinist

Philip S. Johnson (January 27, 1953 – November 11, 2011) was an American violinist. Though he was a promising talent in his youth, his career never took off. He is now known to have stolen the Ames Stradivarius, a valuable antique violin, from Roman Totenberg in 1980. Although Johnson was suspected, the instrument was not recovered until 2015, four years after his death (and three years after Totenberg's death).

== Biography ==
Johnson was a gifted violinist from the age of seven. After leaving Ridley High School in Pennsylvania in 1970, he attended Florida Bible College. In 1976 he studied music at Boston University and was taught by Joseph Silverstein and Roman Totenberg, among others. At university, Johnson was frequently at odds with teachers and other students, and was expelled in 1978 for insufficient academic performance.

In 1980, now penniless and subsisting on odd jobs and petty theft, Johnson stole the Ames Stradivarius from Totenberg's dressing room after a concert. He played it regularly, including at public venues, but it was never recognized. After 1980, Johnson made a very modest living as a freelance musician.

In the early 1990s, Johnson found a measure of success after forming the musical trio Mobius with cellist Michael Fitzpatrick and pianist Xak Bjerken. Their album Beyond Beethoven was well received, but the trio dissolved after missteps by Johnson at performances. He performed at the Festival dei Due Mondi in Spoleto, invited by his friend the festival director Steven Mercurio.

Johnson married the engineer Thanh Tran, with whom he had two daughters. He attempted to make a living off working in finance. On account of his erratic behavior, in 2003 he and his wife separated. In 2011, he filed for bankruptcy and died later that year at age 58 of pancreatic cancer.

== Legacy ==
Johnson's former wife discovered the Stradivarius in his belongings and attempted to sell it in 2015, not knowing the violin's origin and value. After a dealer identified it and contacted the FBI, the violin was returned to Totenberg's heirs in August 2015.

He influenced the pianist James Rhodes.
