= Brinton Averil Smith =

American cellist (born 1969)

Brinton Averil Smith (born 1969, in Royal Oak, Michigan) is an American cellist.

Smith has been the principal cellist of the Houston Symphony since 2005 and is a faculty member of the Shepherd School of Music at Rice University and the Aspen Music Festival, as well as being a frequent guest soloist and chamber musician. Smith gave the first professional performance of Castelnuovo-Tedesco's cello concerto, Op. 72 in over 80 years, and the live performance was released on the Naxos label in June 2018. Smith is known for his live performance videos of unusual cello works such as Sibelius' Theme and Variations for solo cello and violin transcriptions such as Paganini's 24th caprice, Ravel's Tzigane and Waxman's Carmen Fantasie, as well as his doctoral dissertation on the playing of Emanuel Feuermann.

== Education ==
The son of a mathematician father and pianist mother, Smith was exposed to music at an early age from his mother's rehearsals with Detroit Symphony Orchestra principal cellist Italo Babini and concertmaster Mischa Mischakoff. After moving to Arizona when he was 8, he began studying the cello. At age ten he began taking courses in German, mathematics, and music at Arizona State University, and by age 14 left high school to attend the university full-time, receiving a BA in mathematics at age 17. During this time he studied with cellist Gordon Epperson in Tucson, Eleonore Schoenfeld in Los Angeles and periodically with Italo Babini in Detroit. Smith attended graduate school at the University of Southern California and completed work for an MA in mathematics at age 19. After a summer studying with Zara Nelsova at the Aspen Music Festival, Smith chose to pursue music full-time and enrolled at the Juilliard School with Nelsova, where he received MM and DMA degrees, writing his thesis on the Physical and Interpretive Technique of Emanuel Feuermann.

== Career ==
Smith was appointed principal cellist of the San Diego Symphony in 1994, while still a student at Juilliard. When San Diego filed for bankruptcy in 1996 and ceased operations for two years, Smith became the principal cellist of the Fort Worth Symphony (1996–2002) and then a section cellist in the New York Philharmonic (2002-5). Since 2005 Smith has been the principal cellist of the Houston Symphony. Smith has taught at Rice University's Shepherd School of Music since 2006, the Aspen Music Festival since 2011 and the Sarasota Music Festival since 2013.

As a soloist, Smith's North American engagements have included performances at Carnegie Hall, Lincoln Center, and with orchestras throughout the country, while his broadcast performances include CBS's Sunday Morning and regular appearances on NPR’s Performance Today and Symphonycast. His live concert performances of unusual cello repertoire and virtuosic transcriptions on YouTube, have been viewed nearly a million times, including over 250,000 views of a live encore of Paganini's 24th Caprice. As a devoted advocate of compelling unfamiliar repertoire, Smith gave the North American premiers of rediscovered works of Jean Sibelius and Alexander Zemlinsky (with pianist Evelyn Chen), and recently gave the first professional performance of the lost cello concerto of Mario Castelnuovo-Tedesco (with conductor Kazuki Yamada and the Houston Symphony) since its premiere in 1935 with Arturo Toscanini and Gregor Piatigorsky, and the world premiere of Castelnuovo-Tedesco's 1951 Sonata for Violin and Cello (with violinist Adele Anthony.)

As a chamber musician, Smith has collaborated with violinist Gil Shaham on numerous occasions including Carnegie Hall's Gil Shaham and Friends series and with cellists Yo-Yo Ma and Lynn Harrell, pianists Emanuel Ax, Jonathan Biss and Kirill Gerstein, violinists James Ehnes, Cho-Liang Lin and Sarah Chang, soprano Dawn Upshaw, and members of the Beaux Arts Trio and the Guarneri, Emerson, Juilliard, Cleveland, and Berg quartets. He has performed with the Chamber Music Society of Lincoln Center, the Marlboro Music Festival, the Aspen Music Festival, the Sarasota Music Festival, the Seattle Chamber Music Society, the Mainly Mozart Festival, the Brevard Music Festival and the Texas Music Festival.

== Discography ==
- Exiles in Paradise - Émigré Composers in Hollywood with Evelyn Chen, piano, Naxos
- Mario Castelnuovo-Tedesco Cello Concerto, Op 72 and transcriptions of Mozart, Rossini and Ravel with Kazuki Yamada and the Houston Symphony, Evelyn Chen, piano, Naxos
- The Fauré Album, works for Violin, Piano and Cello with Gil Shaham and Akira Eguchi, Canary Classics
- Miklós Rózsa Concerto for Cello and Orchestra, Op. 32, Complete Orchestral Music, Vol. 5 with James Sedares and the New Zealand Symphony Orchestra., Koch
- Steven Gerber Chamber Music - Piano Trio, Duo, Elegy, Notturno, Gershwiniana with Kurt Nikkanen, Cho-Liang Lin and Cyrus Beroukhim, violins, Sarah Davis Buechner, piano, Naxos
- A. Louis Scarmolin: In Retrospect - Salon and Chamber Music, with Vladimir Tyspin and Lisa Gihae Kim, violins, Vivek Kamath, viola, MSR Classics

== Writings ==
- The Physical and Interpretive technique of Emanuel Feuermann, Juilliard DMA Dissertation, May 1998
- On the Future of Classical Music, Musician's Report to the Board, May 2014
- Post-Hurricane Harvey remarks, delivered from the stage, September, 2017
- Emanuel Feuermann and the Art of Phrasing, ASTA Cello Forum, February 2012.
