= Amy Totenberg =

American judge (born 1950)

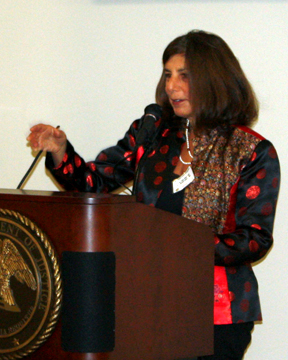
- Totenberg in April 2015

Senior Judge of the United States District Court for the Northern District of Georgia
- Incumbent
- Assumed office April 3, 2021

Judge of the United States District Court for the Northern District of Georgia
- In office March 1, 2011 – April 3, 2021
- Appointed by: Barack Obama
- Preceded by: Jack Tarpley Camp Jr.
- Succeeded by: Sarah Geraghty

Personal details
- Born: 1950 (age 75–76) New York City, U.S.
- Relatives: Roman Totenberg (father), Nina Totenberg (sister)
- Education: Harvard University (AB, JD)

Amy Mil Totenberg (born 1950) is a senior United States district judge of the United States District Court for the Northern District of Georgia. She previously worked in private practice in Atlanta and also formerly served as a special master for the United States District Court for the District of Maryland.

== Early life and education ==
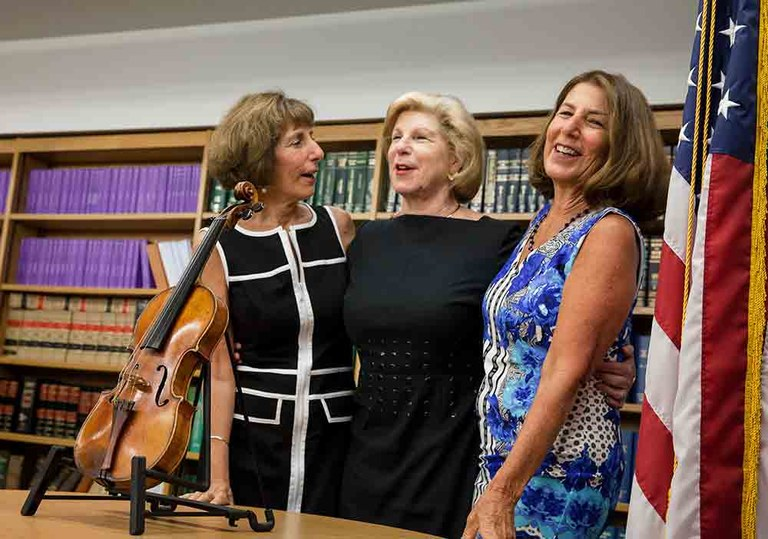
Left to right: Sisters Jill, Nina Totenberg, and Amy celebrate the return of their father’s Stradivarius violin in August 2015

Amy Totenberg was born in New York City, the daughter of Melanie Francis (Eisenberg), a real estate broker, and violinist Roman Totenberg. Her father was a Polish Jewish immigrant, who lost many of his family members in the Holocaust. Her mother was of German Jewish and Polish Jewish descent from an upper-class family that had lived in San Francisco and New York. Her eldest sister, Nina Totenberg, is a Supreme Court correspondent for NPR. Another sister, Jill Totenberg, is a businesswoman.

Totenberg earned an Artium Baccalaureus, magna cum laude, in 1974 from Harvard-Radcliffe College and a Juris Doctor in 1977 from Harvard Law School.

== Career ==
Upon graduating from Harvard-Radcliffe, Totenberg worked as a summer intern at the law firm of James M. Haviland in Charleston, West Virginia. In 1975 she was a legal assistant for Education/Instrucción in Roxbury, Massachusetts, and held this position into 1977. After graduating from law school, she served as a partner for The Law Project in Atlanta from 1977 until 1982. She served as a sole legal practitioner in Atlanta from 1982 until 1994. Between 1988 and 1993, Totenberg worked part-time for the city of Atlanta as a pro tem Municipal Court Judge. From 1994 until 1998, Totenberg served as the first-ever general counsel for Atlanta's school system. From 1998 until becoming a federal judge in 2011, Totenberg served as a sole legal practitioner and arbitrator in Atlanta, working part-time as a special master and court monitor for several United States district courts. She also worked from 2004 until 2007 as an adjunct professor at the Emory University School of Law.

=== Federal judicial service ===
In February 2009, Totenberg submitted a resume and letter of interest for a United States district judgeship vacancy. After an interview by a committee appointed by the Georgia Democratic Congressional delegation, Totenberg was among the applicants whose names were submitted to the White House. On March 17, 2010, President Barack Obama nominated Totenberg to fill the judicial vacancy on the United States District Court for the Northern District of Georgia that had been created by the decision by Judge Jack Tarpley Camp Jr. to assume senior status at the end of 2008. Totenberg was reported out of the United States Senate Committee on the Judiciary on December 1, 2010, by a voice vote. Senators returned Totenberg's nomination to President Obama at the end of the 111th Congress, however, and he resubmitted the nomination on January 5, 2011. The Senate confirmed Totenberg by a voice vote on February 28, 2011. She received her commission on March 1, 2011. She assumed senior status on April 3, 2021.

== See also ==
- List of Jewish American jurists

Legal offices
Preceded by Jack Tarpley Camp Jr.	Judge of the United States District Court for the Northern District of Georgia; 2011–2021	Succeeded by Sarah Geraghty
