= Gary Kirkpatrick =

Gary Kirkpatrick (August 19, 1941 – February 22, 2021) was an American concert pianist from Junction City, Kansas.

Early studies were with his mother, beginning at age five. He played his first recital at the age of 11, performing works of Bach, Liszt, and Mozart. Kirkpatrick received his Bachelor of Music in 1962 from the Eastman School of Music, where he studied with José Echániz. He later received an artist's diploma from the University of Music and Performing Arts, Vienna in 1967, studying with Dieter Weber.

He was recipient of the First Prize in the Elena Rombrow-Stepenow Piano Competition in 1964, and the Second Prize in the International Piano Competition Premio in Jaén, Spain in 1966. In 1966, he appeared on a Musical Heritage disc of early piano sonatas, adding a third hand to an unusual sonata for three-hands/one piano of Johann Wilhelm Hässler performed by longtime Eastman piano faculty member Eugene List.

Kirkpatrick was a member of the award-winning Verdehr Trio, a chamber group whose instrumentation was for violin, clarinet and piano. He joined the trio in 1980, serving as its pianist for 18 years. The ensemble commissioned over 100 pieces, including five triple concertos, by such composers as Alan Hovhannes, Gunther Schuller, Ned Rorem and many others. They recorded over 15 installments in the Making of a Medium CD Series. In addition to his work with the trio, Kirkpatrick also performed regularly with the violinist Walter Verdehr in violin/piano recitals.

Kirkpatrick was a member of the Halcyon Trio (clarinet/viola/piano) from 2001 until 2015. The instrumentation of this ensemble was invented by Mozart in his Kegelstatt Trio K. 498 for the same instrumentation known as Kegelstadt. The movie composer Lalo Schiffrin, composer of the theme from Mission: Impossible, was commissioned to compose a triple concerto for the Halcyon Trio, which was premiered at The New Jersey Performing Arts Center in Newark, New Jersey with the New Jersey Symphony Orchestra conducted by Anne Mason. The premiere occurred on September 10, 2004.

He gave the world premiere of John Link's Piano Concerto in 2002 with the Orchestra at William Paterson University.

Kirkpatrick served as a staff pianist at the Interlochen Arts Academy from 1962 to 1963, and upon his return to the United States in 1967, taught at the University of Kansas Lawrence for two years. From 1969 until 1973, he was a professor at Interlochen. Kirkpatrick was professor of music at William Paterson University, where he taught from 1973 to 2019. He received The Dean's Award for Excellent Artistic Achievement in 1995 for excellence in teaching. Kirkpatrick died on February 22, 2021, at age 79.
