= Yevgeny Kutik =

Belarusian-American concert violinist (born 1985)

- Born: 1985 (age 40–41)
- Origin: Belarus
- Genres: Classical
- Occupation: Solo Concert Violinist
- Instrument: Violin
- Years active: 2003 - present
- Label: Marquis Classics
- Website: www.yevgenykutik.com

Yevgeny Kutik (born 1985) is a Belarusian-American concert violinist whose career debuted in 2003 with an appearance with the Boston Pops and Maestro Keith Lockhart, an honor awarded to him as the 1st prize recipient of the Boston Symphony Orchestra Young Artists Competition Since then, Kutik has appeared worldwide playing solo recitals and concertos with orchestras. He has also won numerous awards including the 2006 Salon de Virtuosi Grant, and the Tanglewood Music Center Jules Reiner Violin Prize. In addition to being a concert violinist, Kutik is also a keynote speaker/representative for the Jewish Federations of North America (JFNA) Speakers Bureau.

== Accomplishments & Awards ==
Yevgeny Kutik’s career has included multiple competitions, awards and recitals. In 2011, Kutik made his Lincoln Center debut at Alice Tully Hall playing the Mendelssohn D minor Violin Concerto with the Riverside Symphony, the same group with whom he made his New York City orchestral debut in 2008 playing the Tsontakis Violin Concerto No. 2. Of that performance The New York Times said his violin projected “an old-fashioned rhapsodic style, which was magnified by (his) rich, sweet tone.” In 2009, Kutik made his German debut with the WDR Rundfunk Orchestra, of which a journalist from DerWesten claimed Yevgeny “enraptured the crowd” with his performance. Other recent performances have included well-received appearances with the Tokyo Vivaldi Ensemble in Japan, the acclaimed premiere of the violin concerto “Versus” by Ron Ford with the Tanglewood Music Center Orchestra, (lauded by critics from The New York Times and The Boston Globe), and a return appearance with the Boston Pops and Keith Lockhart. As a recitalist, he has been presented by the Phillips Collection in Washington D.C., National Arts Club in New York City, Dame Myra Hess Series in Chicago and in Europe at the esteemed Ludwigsburger Schlossfestspiele (Germany) and Verbier (Switzerland) festivals. In 2006, Kutik won the Salon de Virtuosi Grant and the Tanglewood Music Center Jules Reiner Violin Prize, and he appeared at the 2006 International Violin Competition of Indianapolis, where he became a key figure in a film exploring the life of the competitors).

== Debut Album, "Sound of Defiance" ==
In July 2011, Kutik self-produced his first professional recording through a Kickstarter fundraising campaign. Fans and supporters contributed over $8,000 toward the recording costs. The resulting recording was then signed by Marquis Classics in Toronto for international distribution, with an official release date of January 31, 2012. The album was inspired by Kutik’s cultural heritage and features works that were created during some of the darkest periods in the lives of Alfred Schnittke, Joseph Achron, Dmitri Shostakovich and Arvo Pärt.

== 2011 - 2012 season ==
In his 2011-2012 season, Yevgeny Kutik is featured in debuts with Riverside Symphony at Lincoln Center’s Alice Tully Hall, Washington DC’s Embassy Series, Germany’s Norddeutsche Philharmonie Rostock, The East Texas Symphony Orchestra, and a residency at the University of Massachusetts Amherst, performing recital and orchestra programs, as well as conducting a masterclass. The season will also feature his Prague debut at the Lobkowicz castle by invitation of Prince William Lobkowicz.

Yevgeny continues his close association with the Jewish Federations of North America Speaker’s Bureau, annually performing throughout the United States to raise awareness and promote the assistance of refugees from around the world, a cause to which he is particularly dedicated.
