= Marquis Classics =

Canadian record label

Marquis Classics is a Canadian record label, founded in 1981 by Earl Rosen. The company is based in Toronto and owned by Rosen and Dinah Hoyle.

Marquis specializes in jazz and classical recordings. The label's recordings are distributed in North America by Entertainment One Music Distribution. Marquis Classics distributes re-issues of a number of reissued 1960s and 1970s releases from the independent label Orion Master Recordings.

== List of Marquis artists ==
- Amanda Forsyth
- Catherine Manoukian
- Christina Petrowska-Quilico
- Donald Patriquin
- Leonard Hokanson
- Manhattan Piano Trio
- Patricia O'Callaghan
- Poulenc Trio
- Trevor Pinnock
- Yevgeny Kutik
