= Silvia Roederer =

Silvia Roederer DMA (USC) is a native of Argentina. Her focus on piano began after emigrating to the U.S. and includes study with John Perry at USC, David Burge at Eastman, and Menahem Pressler at festivals in Banff, Long Beach, and Ravinia.

She was the 1981 winner of the Joanna Hodges International Piano Competition, as well as the 1994 winner of the fifth annual First Coast Piano Competition in Jacksonville, Florida.

Solo recitals include a Los Angeles debut on the "Rising Stars" series at the Ambassador Auditorium, a Chicago debut on the Dame Myra Hess series, and performances on the "Junge Interpreter" series at the Carinthischer Sommer Festival in Austria.

In 1997 she joined the Verdehr Trio, a violin-clarinet-piano ensemble which has created a new chamber music medium over the past 30 years by commissioning over 150 works for its unusual combination. The Verdehr Trio has performed often in New York City with recent performances in Carnegie Hall (2001) and Merkin Hall (2002). The Trio is in residence at the Phillips Collection in Washington, D.C., plays throughout the U.S., and has recently toured Europe, South America, and China.

CD recordings with Roederer as pianist are on Crystal Records (Verdehr) and Centaur Records (with trumpeter Scott Thornburg).

Silvia is currently the Keyboard Area chair and instructor of piano and piano pedagogy at Western Michigan University in Kalamazoo, Michigan.
