= Cristina Pato =

Spanish musician (born 1980)

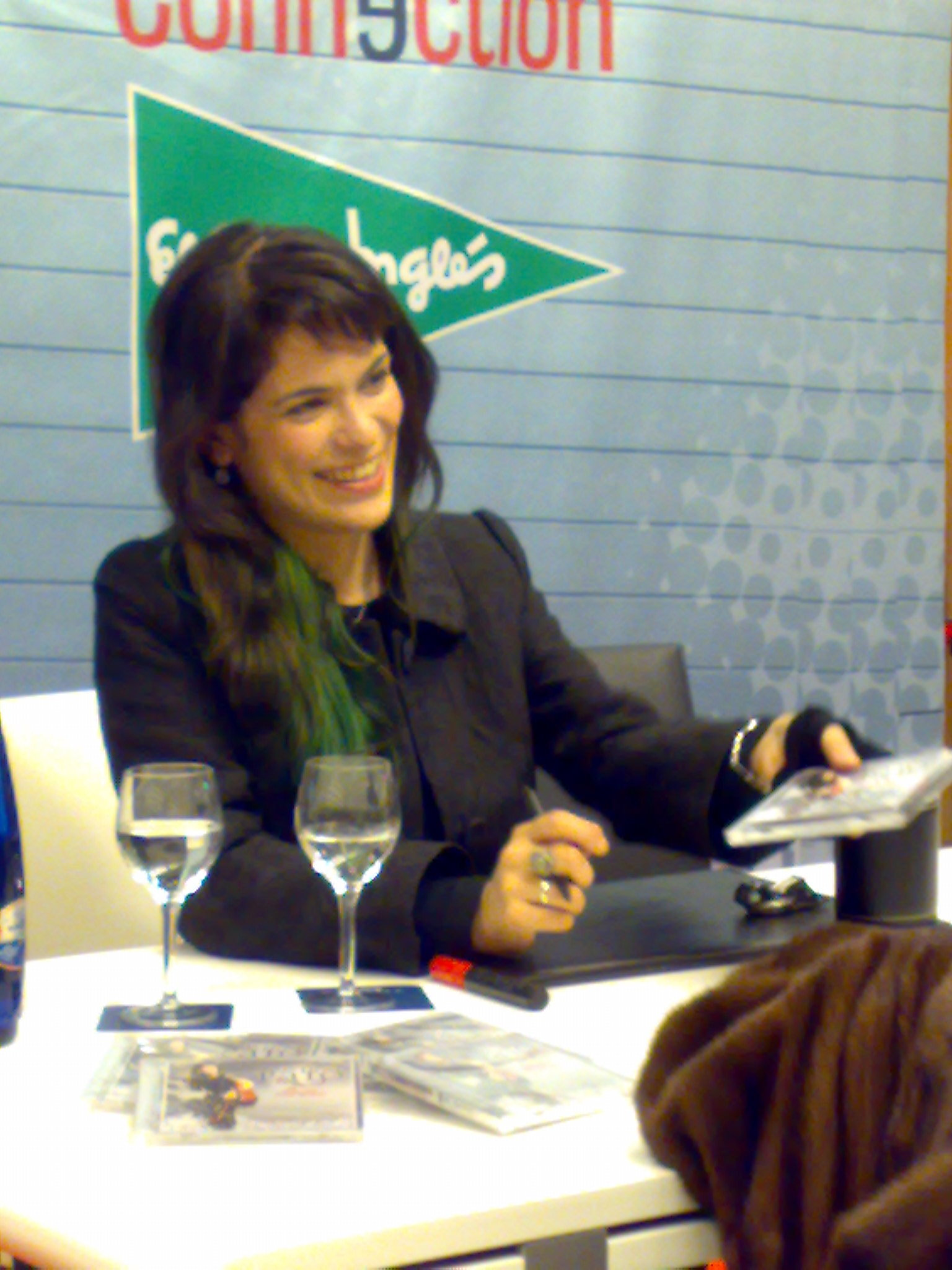
- Pato signing her album in Vigo, 2010

Background information
- Born: Cristina Pato Lorenzo; 17 August 1980 (age 46); Ourense, Galicia, Spain
- Genres: Latin; classical; jazz
- Occupation: Musician
- Instruments: Galician gaita; piano; flute; voice
- Years active: 1999–present
- Label: Sunnyside
- Website: www.cristinapato.com

Cristina Pato Lorenzo (born August 17, 1980) is a Spanish Galician bagpiper, pianist and writer. Cristina has served as a visiting professor and artist-in-residence at New York University, Harvard University, and the University of California, Santa Barbara. Additionally, she collaborated for over 15 years with Silkroad (arts organization), the non-profit organization founded by cellist Yo-Yo Ma.

== Music career ==
Pato is the first female Galician gaita musician to record a solo album. She appeared on the Grammy Award-winning albums Yo-Yo Ma and Friends: Songs of Joy and Peace (2008) and Sing Me Home (2016) and in the documentary The Music of Strangers: Yo-Yo Ma and The Silk Road Ensemble, directed by academy award winner Morgan Neville. She has also worked with Arturo O'Farrill, Paquito D’Rivera, Chicago Symphony Orchestra, and the New York Philharmonic, as well as dancers Damian Woetzel and Lil Buck. [1]

Since 2017, Cristina writes a weekly column titled “The Art of Restlessness” for Spanish newspaper La Voz de Galicia for which she was awarded the XVII Afundación Journalism Prize: Fernández del Riego. In 2022 she published her debut novel “No día do seu enterro” (“On His Burial Day”) with Editorial Galaxia (Colección Literaria, 2022). And in 2025, her second novel "Fóra de foco" was published also by Editorial Galaxia.

== Discography ==
=== As leader ===
- Tolemia (Fonofolk, 1999)
- Xilento (Fonofolk, 2001)
- From Russia to Brazil with Patrice Jegou (Zouma, 2006)
- The Galician Connection (Zouma, 2010)
- Migrations (Sunnyside, 2013)
- Rustica with Davide Salvado, Anxo Pintos, Roberto Comesana (Zouma, 2015)
- Latina, Galician Bagpipes & Piano (Sunnyside, 2015)

== See also ==
- Galician traditional music
