= National Philharmonic at Strathmore =

Orchestra based in North Bethesda, Maryland, US

National Philharmonic
- Orchestra
- Short name: NatPhil
- Former name: Montgomery Chamber Orchestra
- Founded: 1983
- Location: North Bethesda, Maryland
- Concert hall: Music Center at Strathmore
- Principal conductor: Piotr Gajewski
- Website: nationalphilharmonic.org

The National Philharmonic (NatPhil) at Strathmore is an orchestra with over fifty professional musicians based at the Music Center at Strathmore in North Bethesda, Maryland. Founded in the mid-1980s as the Montgomery Chamber Orchestra by principal conductor Piotr Gajewski, it became the National Philharmonic in 2003 after merging with the Masterworks Chorus.

Originally based in the F. Scott Fitzgerald Theater in Rockville, Maryland, it became the Music Center at Strathmore's ensemble-in-residence when that facility opened in 2005. In 2021, the orchestra began performing at the newly opened Capital One Hall in Tysons, Virginia.

The largest and most active orchestra in Montgomery County, Maryland, it gives over thirty performances a year often accompanied by world-renowned guest artists like Brian Ganz, Sarah Chang, and Zuill Bailey, or by leading musicians with the elite orchestras in the area, like concertmaster Nurit Bar-Joseph of the National Symphony Orchestra.

The orchestra provides hands-on music instruction for all second-graders in Montgomery County public schools continuing through middle school and high school with opportunities to perform in youth ensembles and master classes. Additionally, concert admission was free to all youths.

The orchestra threatened to close in July 2019, citing increased costs and reduced funding from the Arts and Humanities Council of Montgomery County, but reorganization and a fundraising effort that brought in $500,000 enabled it to continue operating.
