= Liang Wang (oboist) =

American oboist (born 1980)

- Born: 1980 (age 45–46); Qingdao, China
- Genre: Classical Music
- Occupation: Musician
- Instrument: Oboe
- Website: liangoboe.com

Liang Wang (Chinese: 王亮; born 1980) is a Chinese-American musician who joined the New York Philharmonic in 2006 as principal oboe, The Alice Tully Chair.

== Career ==
Wang was born in Qingdao, China, and studied at the Central Conservatory of Music in Beijing and the Idyllwild Arts Academy in California. He received his bachelor's degree from Philadelphia's Curtis Institute of Music, where he studied with Richard Woodhams. He was a fellowship recipient at the Aspen Music Festival and the Music Academy of the West.

Upon graduation from Curtis in 2003, Wang was offered a position as principal oboe of the Richmond Symphony Orchestra, but turned it down in favor of the same position with the orchestra of the San Francisco Ballet. Shortly after that, he was appointed to the San Francisco Symphony. Two weeks later he won an audition for the Cincinnati Symphony Orchestra, where he served as principal oboe. While in that position, he was a finalist in auditions for principal oboe in the Chicago Symphony Orchestra and Cleveland Orchestra. Wang declined positions with the Grant Park Symphony Orchestra and Houston Grand Opera in order to perform with the Santa Fe Opera as principal oboe. He also won an audition for the Metropolitan Opera's orchestra, electing, instead, to join the New York Philharmonic.

Wang was hired as principal oboist of the New York Philharmonic Orchestra in 2006 by Lorin Maazel. As a concerto soloist, he debuted at the Hong Kong Arts Festival during the orchestra's 2008 tour of Asia and at Carnegie Hall in 2009 as well as numerous appearances at Alice Tully Hall. Notable interpretations of the repertoire include Strauss and Mozart's oboe concertos, Bach's Brandenburg concertos, Christopher Rouse's oboe concerto, and Chen Qigang's Extase.

As a chamber musician, Wang has performed at the Santa Fe Chamber Music Festival, the La Jolla Music Society, the Chamber Music Society of Lincoln Center, and the Carnegie Hall Stern Auditorium. Wang has recorded with the Poulenc Trio.

In addition to his performances, Wang is a faculty member at the Manhattan School of Music, where he teaches oboe. He was named an honorary professor at the Central Conservatory of Music in Beijing and the Shanghai Conservatory. Wang has offered master classes at the Juilliard School, Curtis Institute of Music, Cincinnati Conservatory, New York University, The New School, Seoul University, and music conservatories in Singapore, Hanoi, Beijing, and Shanghai.

Wang was named "the artist of the year" by the Beijing Music Festival in 2014. The award was presented by Deng Xiaoping's daughter Deng Rong. He was also invited by General Secretary of the Chinese Communist Party Xi Jinping to perform with the Orchestre Colonne de France at Versailles to celebrate the 50th anniversary of the establishment of French-Chinese diplomatic relations.

== Misconduct allegations ==
The New York Philharmonic fired Wang in 2018 for "unspecified misconduct". His termination was the result of a 6-month investigation by former federal judge Barbara S. Jones which concluded Wang and associate principal trumpeter Matthew Muckey "engaged in misconduct warranting their termination." Their union, American Federation of Musicians Local 802, challenged both of their dismissals through binding arbitration. The arbitrator, Richard Bloch, found that the Philharmonic dismissed both men without sufficient cause, and they were reinstated. About the underlying allegations, Bloch wrote, "nothing in this opinion should be read as concluding that all doubt has been removed concerning the actions."

On April 16, 2024, Vulture published an article elaborating that a colleague accused Wang of providing her a drink she later suspected to contain GHB. She was then allegedly raped by Muckey. In response to Vulture's reporting, the orchestra committee of the philharmonic gave a statement to The New York Times affirming its belief in Wang's misconduct and that it was part of a repeated pattern. Philharmonic CEO Gary Ginstling confirmed that neither Wang nor Muckey would perform for the time being. The philharmonic commissioned an outside investigation into its culture.

On May 1, 2024, Wang sued the Philharmonic for suspending him "without cause or explanation, and in clear violation of the terms of his employment, which expressly require that he be given opportunities to perform and excel as a musician." The lawsuit, filed in federal court in Manhattan, describes his suspension from the orchestra as "a cynical reaction to a magazine article that the Philharmonic knows to be inaccurate". His absence from a scheduled performance of Mozart's oboe concerto, as a soloist, was notable in its timing shortly after allegations resurfaced. On July 11, 2024, the CEO of the philharmonic resigned.

On November 4, 2024, the New York Philharmonic informed Wang that he would be dismissed at the start of the next season after an outside investigation found "patterns of sexual misconduct and abuse of power." Wang will remain on paid leave until the start of the 2025-26 season, when the philharmonic plans to employ a "non-reengagement" clause in his contract.

On April 10, 2025, Wang filed a complaint against the orchestra asserting that he was wrongfully dismissed and that an inquiry by the ensemble was biased against him. The lawsuit argues that he was not, in fact, accused of misconduct in the incident that sparked the investigation and that the philharmonic's decision not to pursue a just cause termination reflects weaknesses in the case. On April 7, 2026, Wang's dismissal from the philharmonic was overturned in court.
