= Steven Gerber =

American composer (1948–2015)

Steven Roy Gerber (September 28, 1948, in Washington, D. C. – May 28, 2015, in New York City) was an American composer of classical music. He attended Haverford College, graduating in 1969 at the age of twenty. He then attended Princeton University with a fellowship to study musical composition.

== Biography and career ==
Steven Gerber's works include the contrapuntal Fantasy for Solo Violin, which has been recorded on both the CRI and Naxos labels, and Piano Trio, commissioned by the Hans Kindler Foundation.

His composition teachers included Robert Parris, James K. Randall, Earl Kim, and Milton Babbitt.

His early works are in a free atonal style. During his years as a graduate student, he wrote serial and non-twelve-tone works, such as the a cappella choral works "Dylan Thomas Settings" and "Illuminations" (Rimbaud), and throughout the remainder of the 1970s most of his works were twelve-tone. Beginning in the early 1980s, he abandoned twelve-tone composition, with rare exceptions, and his music became much more tonal, for example in his Piano Sonata. Since then his music remained largely tonal, sometimes extremely chromatic, sometimes diatonic.

His music has been reviewed in The New York Times and The Washington Post. His music has been played in the former Soviet Union perhaps more widely than that of any other American composer.

In 2005, the conductor Vladimir Ashkenazy commissioned Gerber to compose an orchestral work. The resulting six-movement suite, Music in Dark Times, was premiered by Ashkenazy with the San Francisco Symphony Orchestra on March 25–28, 2009. He died in New York City on May 28, 2015, aged 66.

== List of compositions ==
=== Orchestral ===
- 1981 Harmonium: Six Poems of Wallace Stevens, for solo soprano and orchestra
- 1989 Symphony No. 1
- 1990 Ode (1st movement of Serenade) for string orchestra
- 1990 Serenade for string orchestra
- 1992 Piano Concerto
- 1992 Dirge and Awakening
- 1993 Violin Concerto
- 1994 Cello Concerto
- 1996 Viola Concerto
- 1998 Serenade Concertante
- 1998 Triple Overture for solo violin, cello and piano and orchestra
- 2000 Spirituals, for string orchestra
- 2002 Fanfare for the Voice of A-M-E-R-I-C-A
- 2002 Clarinet Concerto
- 2004 Symphony No. 2, "Elegies and Fanfares"
- 2005 Two Lyric Pieces, for solo violin and string orchestra
- 2005-08 Music in Dark Times

=== Chamber ===
- 1967 Sonata for violin and piano
- 1967 Woodwind Quartet
- 1968 Trio for violin, cello and piano
- 1969 Duo for cello and piano
- 1969 Duo for violin and cello
- 1971 String Trio
- 1972 Nexus, for violin and percussion
- 1973 String Quartet No. 1
- 1977 Duo for flute and piano
- 1978 Dreamwork, for flute, viola, cello, and piano
- 1979 Duo for viola and piano
- 1981 String Quartet No. 2
- 1984 Duo in Three Movements for violin and piano
- 1984 Concertino for string quartet and piano
- 1986 Woodwind Quintet
- 1987 Fantasy Quartet for percussion
- 1988 String Quartet No. 3
- 1991 Piano Quintet for string quartet and piano
- 1995 String Quartet No. 4
- 1996 Notturno, for violin, cello and piano
- 1996 (rev. 2006) Five Canonic Duos, for oboe and bassoon
- 1996 Sonatina for oboe and guitar
- 1997 Three Pieces for Two Violins
- 1999 Prelude and Fugue, for oboe, bassoon, and piano
- 1999 Gershwiniana, for 3 violins (or 2 violins and viola)
- 2000 String Quartet No. 5
- 2001 Three Folksong Transformations, for violin, cello, and piano
- 2002 Spirituals, for clarinet and string quartet
- 2003-1997 Fantasy, Fugue, and Chaconne, for 2 cellos or viola and cello
- 2003 Five Greek Folksongs (after Ravel), for violin and piano
- 2007 Dialogues, for clarinet and piano
- 2009 Two Antiphonal Pieces, for cello and piano
- 2010 Norma's Variations, for violin and piano
- 2011 String Quartet No. 6
- 2011 Spirituals (Book II), for flute and cello

=== Vocal ===
- 1966 Three French Songs (Baudelaire and Verlaine), for high voice and piano
- 1967 After the Funeral (Thomas), for baritone and string trio
- 1974 Doria: Three Poems of Ezra Pound, for soprano and piano
- 1974 "My Papa's Waltz" and Other Songs (Williams, Moore, Plath, Roethke), for soprano and piano
- 1975 Black Hours: Five Sonnets of Gerard Manley Hopkins, for soprano and piano
- 1976 Two Lyrics of Gerard Manley Hopkins, for soprano and string trio
- 1978 Sestina: Altaforte (Pound), for baritone and piano
- 1978 Songs from "The Wild Swans at Coole" (Yeats), for high voice and piano
- 1982 Desert Places: Five Poems of Robert Frost, for high voice and piano
- 1984 Drum-Taps: Three Patriotic Poems (Frost, Whitman, Emerson), for soprano and piano
- 1985 Words for Music Perhaps (Yeats), for soprano and two violins
- 1986 Four Elegiac Songs (Hopkins, Yeats, Shakespeare, Dryden), for high voice and piano
- 1988 Six Songs of William Shakespeare, for medium voice and piano
- 2012 Five Shakespeare Songs, for voice and piano

=== Choral ===
- 1972 Dylan Thomas Settings
- 1972 Illumination (Rimbaud)
- 1973 Ceremony After a Fire Raid (Thomas)
- 1985 Four Choruses from Une Saison en Enfer (Rimbaud)
- 1985 Une Saison en Enfer (Rimbaud), for solo high baritone or tenor, chorus, and piano
- 2004 Sessions of Sweet Silent Thought (5 Sonnets of William Shakespeare)

=== Piano ===
- 1966 Two Toccatas
- 1970 Variations
- 1976 Voices
- 1982 Piano Fantasy: Homage to Copland (first movement of Piano Sonata)
- 1982 Piano Sonata
- 1985 Two Intermezzi
- 1989 Cocktail Music (Song Without Words)

=== Other solo ===
- 1967 Fantasy for violin
- 1971 Epithalamium for flute
- 1977 Fantasy
- 1978 High Wood for oboe
- 1987 Three Songs Without Words (arranged from Words for Music Perhaps) for violin
- 1991 Elegy on the Name "Dmitri Shostakovich" for viola (or cello) - dedicated to Elena Ozol
- 2005 Duet for Solo Clarinet
- 2013 Soliloquy for Solo Bassoon - composed for bassoonist Bryan Young

== Articles ==
- Interview with 21st Century Music: Food for Thought with Steven Gerber
- Interview with Sequenza21
- Essay on Orchestration, by Steven Gerber for New Music Box
- Keeping America Real: Essay on Steven Gerber by Robert Reilly

== Recordings ==
Spirituals for String Orchestra; Clarinet Concerto; Serenade Concertante
St. Petersburg State Academic Symphony/Vladimir Lande, conductor
Jon Manasse, clarinet; Jose Miguel Cueto, violin; Natalia Malkova, violin
Arabesque CD Z6803

Symphony No. 1; Dirge and Awakening; Viola Concerto; Triple Overture
Russian Philharmonic Orchestra/Thomas Sanderling, conductor
Lars Anders Tomter, viola
The Bekova Sisters:
Elvira Bekova, violin
Alfia Bekova, cello
Eleonora Bekova, piano
Chandos CD 9831

Violin Concerto; Cello Concerto; Serenade for String Orchestra
National Chamber Orchestra/Piotr Gajewski, conductor
Kurt Nikkanen, violin; Carter Brey, cello
KOCH International Classics KIC-CD-7501

Fantasy; Three Songs Without Words
Curtis Macomber, violin
Composers Recordings, Inc. CD 706

Une Saison en Enfer
The New Calliope Singers/Peter Schubert, conductor
William Parker, baritone; Steven R. Gerber, piano
Composers Recordings, Inc. CD 638

Elegy on the Name "Dmitri Shostakovich"; Françoise Renard, viola
Suoni e Colori SC 53006

Gershwiniana for three violins; 3 Folksong Transformations; 3 Pieces for two violins; Notturno for piano trio; Elegy on the Name Dmitri Shostakovich for viola; 3 Songs Without Words; Fantasy for violin; Duo for violin and cello; Piano Trio
Kurt Nikkanen, violin and viola; Cho-Liang Lin, violin; Cyrus Beroukhim, violin; Brinton Averil Smith, cello; Sara Davis Buechner, piano
Naxos 8.559618
