= Hansjörg Schellenberger =

German oboist and conductor

Hansjörg Schellenberger (born 1948) is a German oboist and conductor.

He won the first prize at the German Jugend musiziert Competition with seventeen. He continued his studies in Munich with Manfred Clement and he attended master classes with Heinz Holliger. During this period he took part in numerous concerts, many of them dedicated to contemporary music, and obtained prizes in several international competitions, among them, second prize in the ARD International Music Competition in Munich.

In the seventies he was soloist of the Cologne Radio Orchestra and from 1980 to 2001 of the Berlin Philharmonic Orchestra. Between 1980 and 2001 he has played under conductors such as Karajan, Leinsdorf, Giulini, Muti, Mehta and Abbado. He has dedicated a great part of his artistic activity to chamber music with groups such as the Wind Ensemble of the Berlin Philharmonic and the Vienna-Berlin Ensemble.

From 1981 to 1991 he taught at the Berlin Music Academy. He has also been guest professor at the Chigiana Academy in Sienna, Italy and participated with his master classes in the Magister Musicae project. Currently he is principal professor of oboe at the Reina Sofía School of Music in Madrid.

In 1991 Schellenberger founded the Berliner-Haydn-Konzerte cycle, which he continues to conduct himself. He has recorded Beethoven's and Mozart's Piano and Wind Quintets and Poulenc's Trio for piano, oboe and bassoon with J. Levine and M. Turkovic.

From 2021 to 2023, Schellenberger was chief conductor and artistic director of the Berliner Symphoniker.
