= List of classical violinists =

This is a list of notable classical violinists from the baroque era to the 21st century.

For a more comprehensive list of contemporary classical violinists, see List of contemporary classical violinists.

== Baroque era ==
- Christian Heinrich Aschenbrenner (1654–1732)
- Johann Sebastian Bach (1685–1750)
- Thomas Baltzar (c. 1630–1663)
- Heinrich Ignaz Franz Biber (1644–1704)
- Pasquale Bini (1716–1770)
- Arcangelo Corelli (1653–1713)
- Evaristo Felice Dall'Abaco (1675–1742)
- Matthew Dubourg (1707–1767)
- André-Joseph Exaudet (1710–1762)
- Carlo Farina (1600–1640)
- Francesco Geminiani (1687–1762)
- Louis-Gabriel Guillemain (1705–1770)
- Jean-Marie Leclair (1697–1764)
- Pietro Locatelli (1695–1764)
- Jean-Baptiste Lully (1632–1687)
- Francesco Manfredini (1684–1762)
- Nicola Matteis (1670–1714)
- Davis Mell (1604–1662)
- Jean-Joseph de Mondonville (1711–1772)
- Giovanni Battista Pergolesi (1710-1736)
- Johann Georg Pisendel (1687–1755)
- Johann Heinrich Schmelzer (1623–1680)
- Giovanni Battista Somis (1686–1763)
- Giuseppe Tartini (1692–1770)
- Carlo Tessarini (1690–1765)
- Giuseppe Torelli (1658–1709)
- Francesco Maria Veracini (1690–1768)
- Giovanni Battista Vitali (1632–1692)
- Tomaso Antonio Vitali (1663–1745)
- Antonio Vivaldi (1678–1741)

== Classical era ==
- Leopold August Abel (1717–1794)
- Jean Ancot Jnr (1799–1829)
- Pierre Baillot (1771–1842)
- Charles Frederick Baumgarten (1739–1840)
- Franz Benda (1709–1786)
- Gaetano Brunetti (1744–1798)
- Antonio Bartolomeo Bruni (1757–1821)
- Bartolomeo Campagnoli (1751–1827)
- Christian Cannabich (1731–1798)
- Franz Clement (1780–1842)
- Richard Cudmore (1787–1840)
- Ernst Christoph Dressler (1734–1779)
- Franz Eck (1776–1810)
- Domenico Ferrari (1722–1780)
- Ferdinand Fränzl (1767–1833)
- Ignaz Fränzl (1736–1811)
- Pierre Gaviniès (1728–1800)
- Eugène Godecharle (1742–1798)
- Jean-Jacques Grasset (c. 1769–1839)
- Johann Gottlieb Graun (1703–1771)
- François Habeneck (1781–1849)
- Joseph Haydn (1732–1809)
- William Herschel (1738–1822)
- Thaddäus Huber (1742–1798)
- Ivan Mane Jarnović (1747–1804)
- Rodolphe Kreutzer (1766–1831)
- Thomas Linley the younger (1756–1778)
- Antonio Lolli (1730–1802)
- Heinrich August Matthaei (1781–1835)
- Jean-Joseph de Mondonville (1711–1772)
- Franz Anton Morgenroth (1780–1847)
- Leopold Mozart (1719–1787)
- Wolfgang Amadeus Mozart (1756–1791)
- Pietro Nardini (1722–1793)
- Thomas Pinto (1728–1773)
- Friedrich Wilhelm Pixis (1786–1842)
- Gaetano Pugnani (1731–1798)
- Pierre Rode (1774–1830)
- Alessandro Rolla (1757–1841)
- Antonio Rolla (1798–1837)
- Ignaz Schuppanzigh (1776–1830)
- Anton Stamitz (1754–1796)
- Carl Stamitz (1745–1801)
- Johann Stamitz (1717–1757)
- Regina Strinasacchi (c. 1761–1839)
- Luigi Tomasini (1741–1808)
- Giovanni Battista Viotti (1755–1824)

== Romantic era ==
- Jean-Delphin Alard (1815–1888)
- Enrique Fernández Arbós (1863–1939)
- Leopold Auer (1845–1930)
- Stanisław Barcewicz (1858–1929)
- Antonio Bazzini (1818–1897)
- Dora Valesca Becker (1870–1958)
- Antonín Bennewitz (1833–1926)
- Charles Auguste de Bériot (1802–1870)
- Franz Berwald (1796–1868)
- Casimir von Blumenthal (1787–1849)
- Joseph von Blumenthal (1782–1856)
- Alexandre Boucher (1770–1861)
- George Bridgetower (1778–1860)
- Adolph Brodsky (1851–1929)
- Ole Bull (1810–1880)
- Kate Chaplin (1865–1948)
- Fanny Claus (1846–1877)
- Julius Conus (1869–1942)
- Mathieu Crickboom (1871–1947)
- Alfredo D'Ambrosio (1871–1914)
- Charles Dancla (1817–1907)
- Joseph Dando (1806–1894)
- Ferdinand David (1810–1873)
- Adolphe Deloffre (1817–1876)
- Alfred De Sève (1858–1927)
- Jakob Dont (1815–1888)
- František Drdla (1868–1944)
- Bram Eldering (1865–1943)
- Heinrich Wilhelm Ernst (1814–1865)
- Friedrich Ernst Fesca (1789–1826)
- Nahan Franko (1861–1930)
- Sam Franko (1857–1937)
- Jules Garcin (1830–1896)
- Samuel Dean Grimson (1841–1922)
- Jakob Grün (1837–1916)
- François Habeneck (1781–1849)
- Karel Halíř (1859–1909)
- Miska Hauser (1822–1878)
- Carl Heissler (1823–1878)
- Joseph Hellmesberger Jr. (1855–1907)
- Joseph Hellmesberger Sr. (1828–1893)
- Philip A. Herfort (1851–1921)
- Willy Hess (1859–1939)
- Karl Holz ( 1798–1858)
- Jenő Hubay (1858–1937)
- Frantz Jehin-Prume (1839–1899)
- Joseph Joachim (1831–1907)
- Paul Klengel (1854–1935)
- Franz Kneisel (1865–1926)
- Jan Koert (1853–1911)
- Apollinaire de Kontski (1825–1879)
- Iosif Kotek (1855–1885)
- Dragomir Krančević (1847–1929)
- Franjo Krežma (1862–1881)
- Charles Philippe Lafont (1781–1839)
- Walborg Lagerwall (1851–1940)
- Ferdinand Laub (1832–1875)
- Hubert Léonard (1819–1890)
- Karol Lipiński (1790–1862)
- John David Loder (1788–1846)
- Maud MacCarthy (1882–1967)
- David Mannes (1866–1959)
- Martin Pierre Marsick (1847–1924)
- Oscar Martel (1848–1924)
- Lambert Massart (1811–1892)
- Ludwig Wilhelm Maurer (1789–1878)
- Joseph Mayseder (1789–1863)
- Jacques Féréol Mazas (1782–1849)
- Maria Milanollo (1832–1848)
- Teresa Milanollo (1827–1904)
- Jesús de Monasterio (1836–1903)
- Joseph Mosenthal (1834–1896)
- Ovide Musin (1854–1929)
- Tivadar Nachéz (1859–1930)
- Wilma Neruda (1839–1911)
- M. J. Niedzielski (1851–1925)
- Ottokar Nováček (1866–1900)
- Niccolò Paganini (1782–1840)
- Heinrich Panofka (1807–1887)
- Guido Papini (1847–1912)
- Giovanni Battista Polledro (1781–1853)
- Maud Powell (1867–1920)
- François Prume (1816–1849)
- Marietta Sherman Raymond (1862–1949)
- Léon Reynier (1833–1895)
- Oskar Rieding (1840–1918)
- Franz Ries (1846–1932)
- Achille Rivarde (1865–1940)
- Engelbert Röntgen (1829–1897)
- Amanda Röntgen-Maier (1853–1894)
- Pablo de Sarasate (1844–1908)
- Émile Sauret (1852–1920)
- Eugène Sauzay (1809–1901)
- Marianne Stresow Scharwenka (1856–1918)
- Henry Schradieck (1846–1918)
- François Schubert (1808–1878)
- Fritz (Friedrich) Seitz (1848–1918)
- Arma Senkrah (1864–1900)
- Otakar Ševčík (1852–1934)
- Emily Shinner (1862–1901)
- Ödön (Edmund) Singer (1830–1912)
- Camillo Sivori (1818–1894)
- Theodore Spiering (1871–1925)
- Louis Spohr (1784–1859)
- Ludwig Straus (1835–1899)
- Johann Strauss I (1804–1849)
- Johann Strauss II (1825–1899)
- Josef Suk (1874–1935)
- Theodore Thomas (1835–1905)
- César Thomson (1857–1931)
- Agnes Tschetschulin (1859–1942)
- Camilla Urso (1840–1902)
- Thomas Henry Weist-Hill (1828–1891)
- Carl Venth (1860–1938)
- Henri Vieuxtemps (1820–1881)
- Frederik Thorkildsen Wexschall (1798–1845)
- José White (1835–1918)
- Henryk Wieniawski (1835–1880)
- Gabriele Wietrowetz (1866–1937)
- Franz Wilczek (1869–1916)
- August Wilhelmj (1845–1908)
- Emanuel Wirth (1842–1923)
- Eugène Ysaÿe (1858–1931)

== 20th–21st centuries ==
Note: This does not include living violinists, who are listed at List of contemporary classical violinists.

- Rochelle Abramson (1953–2025)
- Joseph Achron (1886–1943)
- Murray Adaskin (1906–2002)
- Anahid Ajemian (1924–2016)
- Samuel Antek (1909–1958)
- Jelly d'Arányi (1893–1966)
- Helen Armstrong (1943–2006)
- Michèle Auclair (1924–2005)
- Florence Austin (1884–1927)
- Felix Ayo (1933–2023)
- Sol Babitz (1911–1982)
- Grażyna Bacewicz (1909–1969)
- Oskar Back (1879–1963)
- Ik-Hwan Bae (1956–2014)
- Israel Baker (1919–2011)
- Tofig Bakikhanov (1930–2026)
- Vera Barstow (1891–1975)
- Walter Barylli (1921–2022)
- Hugh Bean (1929–2003)
- Louise Behrend (1916–2011)
- Nina Beilina (1937–2018)
- Leon Belasco (1902–1988)
- Franz Benteler (1925–2010)
- Yehonatan Berick (1968–2020)
- Klara Berkovich (1928–2024)
- Luigi Alberto Bianchi (1945–2018)
- Petrowitsch Bissing (1871–1961)
- Serge Blanc (1929–2013)
- Harry Blech (1909–1999)
- Naoum Blinder (1889–1965)
- Harry Bluestone (1907–1992)
- Howard Boatwright (1918–1999)
- Lola Bobesco (1921–2003)
- Emanuel Borok (1944–2020)
- Willi Boskovsky (1909–1991)
- Jules Boucherit (1877–1962)
- Natalya Boyarskaya (1946–2025)
- Norbert Brainin (1923–2005)
- Shony Alex Braun (1924–2002)
- Maggy Breittmayer (1888–1961)
- Robert Brink (1924–2014)
- Jascha Brodsky (1907–1997)
- Antonio Brosa (1894–1979)
- Alexander Brott (1915–2005)
- Iona Brown (1941–2004)
- Anshel Brusilow (1928–2018)
- Anker Buch (1940–2014)
- Gerda von Bülow (1904–1990)
- Richard Burgin (1892–1981)
- Grace Burrows (1893–1980)
- Adolf Busch (1891–1952)
- Guila Bustabo (1916–2002)
- Alfredo Campoli (1906–1991)
- Mary Canberg (1918–2004)
- Roberto Cani (1967–2025)
- Lucien Capet (1873–1928)
- Norman Carol (1928–2024)
- Marius Casadesus (1892–1981)
- Arthur Catterall (1883–1943)
- Suzanne Chaigneau (1875–1946)
- Albert Chamberland (1886–1975)
- Corinne Chapelle (1976–2021)
- Eugène Chartier (1893–1963)
- Alexander Chuhaldin (1892–1951)
- Nicolas Chumachenco (1944–2020)
- Stephen Clapp (1939–2014)
- Isidore Cohen (1922–2005)
- Raymond Cohen (1919–2011)
- Alexander Cores (1901–1994)
- Joey Corpus (1958–2017)
- Valentina Crespi (1892–19??)
- Peter Cropper (1945–2015)
- Marcel Darrieux (1891–1989)
- Lukas David (1934–2021)
- Andrew Dawes (1940–2022)
- Désiré Defauw (1885–1960)
- Dorothy DeLay (1917–2002)
- Édouard Dethier (1885–1962)
- Gioconda de Vito (1907–1994)
- Grigoraș Dinicu (1889–1949)
- Joseph Douglass (1871–1935)
- Pierre Doukan (1927–1995)
- Demetrius Constantine Dounis (1893–1954)
- Rafael Druian (1923–2002)
- Helena Dunicz-Niwińska (1915–2018)
- Samuel Dushkin (1891–1976)
- Sophie-Carmen Eckhardt-Gramatté (1898–1974)
- Renate Eggebrecht (1944–2023)
- Arnold Eidus (1922–2013)
- Irwin Eisenberg (1919–2014)
- Mischa Elman (1891–1967)
- George Enescu (1881–1955)
- Mary Davenport Engberg (1880–1951)
- Ayla Erduran (1934–2025)
- Broadus Erle (1918–1977)
- Devy Erlih (1928–2012)
- Toshiya Eto (1927–2008)
- Adila Fachiri (1886–1962)
- Ilona Fehér (1901–1988)
- Lorand Fenyves (1918–2004)
- Aldo Ferraresi (1902–1978)
- Christian Ferras (1933–1982)
- Mikhail Fichtenholz (1920–1985)
- Joan Field (1915–1988)
- António Fortunato de Figueiredo (1903–1981)
- Rudolf Fitzner (1868–1934)
- Jorja Fleezanis (1952–2022)
- Eugene Fodor (1950–2011)
- Vera Fonaroff (1883–1962)
- Zino Francescatti (1902–1991)
- Stefan Frenkel (1902–1979)
- Walter Fried (1877–1925)
- Erick Friedman (1939–2004)
- Joseph Fuchs (1899–1997)
- Marjorie Fulton (1909–1962)
- Ivan Galamian (1903–1981)
- Felix Galimir (1910–1999)
- Samuel Gardner (1891–1984)
- John Georgiadis (1939–2021)
- Robert Gerle (1924–2005)
- André Gertler (1907–1998)
- Stefi Geyer (1888–1956)
- Elizabeth Gilels (1919–2008)
- Zinaida Gilels (1924–2000)
- Bronislav Gimpel (1911–1979)
- Josef Gingold (1909–1995)
- Ivry Gitlis (1922–2020)
- Thelma Given (1896–1977)
- Carroll Glenn (1918–1983)
- Raymond Gniewek (1931–2021)
- Paul Godwin (1902–1982)
- Szymon Goldberg (1909–1993)
- Boris Goldstein (1922–1987)
- Eugene Goossens (1893–1962)
- Jascha Gopinko (1891–1980)
- Alexei Gorokhov (1927–1999)
- Barry Griffiths (1939–2020)
- Sidney Griller (1911–1993)
- Harold Grimson (1882–1917)
- Jessie Grimson (1873–1954)
- Samuel Bonarius Grimson (1879–1955)
- Frederick Grinke (1911–1987)
- Erich Gruenberg (1924–2020)
- Arthur Grumiaux (1921–1986)
- Daniel Guilet (1899–1990)
- Boris Gutnikov (1931–1986)
- Ida Haendel (1928–2020)
- Betty-Jean Hagen (1930–2016)
- Heimo Haitto (1925–1999)
- Marie Hall (1884–1956)
- Olivebelle Hamon (1909–1987)
- Sandor Harmati (1892–1936)
- Cecilia Hansen (1897–1989)
- Alice Harnoncourt (1930–2022)
- Margaret Harrison (1899–1995)
- May Harrison (1890–1959)
- Sidney Harth (1925–2011)
- Josef Hassid (1923–1950)
- Kató Havas (1920–2018)
- Marjorie Hayward (1885–1953)
- Donald Hazelwood (1930–2025)
- Yaëla Hertz (1930–2014)
- Julius Hegyi (1923–2007)
- Jascha Heifetz (1901–1987)
- Philippe Hirschhorn (1946–1996)
- Rosa Hochmann (1875–1955)
- David Hochstein (1892–1918)
- Henry Holst (1899–1991)
- Bronisław Huberman (1882–1947)
- Emanuel Hurwitz (1919–2006)
- Liana Isakadze (1946–2024)
- Jacques Israelievitch (1948–2015)
- Sascha Jacobsen (1895–1972)
- Max Jaffa (1911–1991)
- Charles Jaffe (1917–2011)
- Piotr Janowski (1951–2008)
- Philip S. Johnson (1953–2011)
- Oleg Kagan (1946–1990)
- Carmel Kaine (1937–2013)
- Suna Kan (1936–2023)
- Bela Katona (1920–2018)
- Louis Kaufman (1905–1994)
- Franciszek Kempa (1903–1953)
- Daisy Kennedy (1893–1981)
- Eda Kersey (1904–1944)
- Felix Khuner (1906–1991)
- Valery Klimov (1931–2022)
- Paul Kling (1929–2005)
- Karl Klingler (1879–1971)
- Daniel Kobialka (1943–2021)
- Paul Kochanski (1887–1934)
- Roman Kofman (1936–2026)
- Dmitri Kogan (1978–2017)
- Leonid Kogan (1924–1982)
- Varujan Kojian (1935–1993)
- Felix Kok (1924–2010)
- Adolph Koldofsky (1905–1951)
- Rudolf Kolisch (1896–1978)
- Péter Komlós (1935–2017)
- Anton Kontra (1932–2020)
- Hugo Kortschak (1884–1957)
- Takehisa Kosugi (1938–2018)
- Bogodar Kotorovych (1941–2009)
- Boris Koutzen (1901–1966)
- Dénes Kovács (1930–2005)
- Henryk Kowalski (1911–1982)
- Tosca Kramer (1903–1976)
- Louis Krasner (1903–1995)
- Herman Krebbers (1923–2018)
- Fritz Kreisler (1875–1962)
- Jan Kubelík (1880–1940)
- Georg Kulenkampff (1898–1948)
- Jaakko Kuusisto (1974–2022)
- Helen Kwalwasser (1927–2017)
- Fredell Lack (1922–2017)
- Jeanne Lamon (1949–2021)
- Brenton Langbein (1928–1993)
- Isidor Lateiner (1930–2005)
- Remo Lauricella (1912–2003)
- Susanne Lautenbacher (1932–2020)
- Arthur Leavins (1917–1995)
- Maryvonne Le Dizès (1940–2024)
- Everett Lee (1916–2022)
- Sylvia Lent (1903–1972)
- Ida Levin (1963–2016)
- Walter Levin (1924–2017)
- Nona Liddell (1927–2017)
- Maria Lidka (1914–2013)
- Ernest Llewellyn (1915–1982)
- Lea Luboshutz (1885–1965)
- Sergiu Luca (1943–2010)
- Alberto Lysy (1935–2009)
- Francis MacMillen (1885–1973)
- Klaus Maetzl (1941–2016)
- Hugh Maguire (1926–2013)
- Paul Makanowitzky (1920–1998)
- Juan Manén (1883–1971)
- Robert Mann (1920–2018)
- Kevork Mardirossian (1954–2024)
- Henri Marteau (1874–1934)
- Lucien Martin (1908–1950)
- Johanna Martzy (1924–1979)
- Leonora Jackson McKim (1879–1969)
- Ivor McMahon (1924–1972)
- Alfred Eugene Megerlin (1880–1941)
- Wilhelm Melcher (1940–2005)
- Isolde Menges (1893–1976)
- Yehudi Menuhin (1916–1999)
- Geoffrey Michaels (1944–2024)
- Roberto Michelucci (1922–2010)
- Stoika Milanova (1945–2024)
- Martin Milner (1928–2000)
- Nathan Milstein (1903–1992)
- Mischa Mischakoff (1895–1981)
- Emil Młynarski (1870–1935)
- Alexander Mogilevsky (1885–1953)
- Cyril Monk (1882–1970)
- Alma Moodie (1898–1943)
- Lydia Mordkovitch (1944–2014)
- Erika Morini (1904–1995)
- Alfonso Mosesti (1924–2018)
- Konstantin Mostras (1886–1965)
- Peter Mountain (1923–2013)
- Aubrey Murphy (1965–2025)
- Clarence Myerscough (1930–2000)
- David Nadien (1926–2014)
- Yfrah Neaman (1923–2003)
- Sheila Nelson (1936–2020)
- Ginette Neveu (1919–1949)
- Siegmund Nissel (1922–2008)
- Ricardo Odnoposoff (1914–2004)
- David Oistrakh (1908–1974)
- Igor Oistrakh (1931–2021)
- Edgar Ortenberg (1900–1996)
- Trond Øyen (1929–1999)
- Igor Ozim (1931–2024)
- Michaela Paetsch (1961–2023)
- Priscilla Paetsch (1931–2017)
- Margaret Pardee (1920–2016)
- Manoug Parikian (1920–1987)
- Kathleen Parlow (1890–1963)
- György Pauk (1936–2024)
- Edith Peinemann (1937–2023)
- Barbara Penny (1929–2007)
- Louis Persinger (1887–1966)
- Günter Pichler (1940–2026)
- Victor Pikayzen (1933–2023)
- Maximilian Pilzer (1890–1958)
- Alfred Pochon (1878–1959)
- Max Pollikoff (1904–1984)
- Enrico Polo (1868–1953)
- Miron Polyakin (1895–1941)
- Katia Popov (1965–2018)
- Ruth Posselt (1914–2007)
- Jean Pougnet (1907–1968)
- Gaston Poulet (1892–1974)
- Albert Pratz (1914–1995)
- Mikhail Press (1871–1938)
- Váša Příhoda (1900–1960)
- Simon Pullman (1890–1942)
- Tibor Józef Pusztai (1946–2016)
- Manuel Quiroga (1892–1961)
- Michael Rabin (1936–1972)
- Rosemary Rapaport (1918–2011)
- Adolf Rebner (1876–1967)
- Ossy Renardy (1920–1953)
- Florizel von Reuter (1890–1985)
- Ángel Reyes (1919–1988)
- Veda Reynolds (1922–2000)
- Ruggiero Ricci (1918–2012)
- Stanley Ritchie (1935–2026)
- Amadeo Roldán (1900–1939)
- Paul Rolland (1911–1978)
- Aaron Rosand (1927–2019)
- Alma Rosé (1906–1944)
- Arnold Rosé (1863–1946)
- Eric Rosenblith (1920–2010)
- Max Rostal (1905–1991)
- Jack Rothstein (1925–2001)
- Olga Rudge (1895–1996)
- Albert Sammons (1886–1957)
- Eugene Sârbu (1950–2024)
- David Sarser (1921–2013)
- Egon Sassmannshaus (1928–2010)
- Sidney Sax (1913–2005)
- Hansheinz Schneeberger (1926–2019)
- Alexander Schneider (1908–1993)
- Wolfgang Schneiderhan (1915–2002)
- Dina Schneidermann (1931–2016)
- Jaap Schröder (1925–2020)
- Michel Schwalbé (1919–2012)
- Toscha Seidel (1899–1962)
- Berl Senofsky (1926–2002)
- Eudice Shapiro (1914–2007)
- Samuel Sherman (1871–1948)
- Nelli Shkolnikova (1928–2010)
- Sadah Shuchari (1906–2001)
- Oscar Shumsky (1917–2000)
- Joseph Silverstein (1932–2015)
- Jacques Singer (1910–1980)
- Julian Sitkovetsky (1925–1958)
- Semyon Snitkovsky (1933–1981)
- Marie Soldat-Roeger (1863–1955)
- Denise Soriano-Boucherit (1916–2006)
- Leonard Sorkin (1916–1985)
- Eduard Sõrmus (1878–1940)
- Albert Spalding (1883–1953)
- Tossy Spivakovsky (1906–1998)
- Christian Stadelmann (1959–2019)
- Sergei Stadler (1962–2026)
- Ethel Stark (1910–2012)
- William Starr (1923–2020)
- William Steck (1934–2013)
- Benjamin Steinberg (1915–1974)
- Albert Stern (1937–2024)
- Hellmut Stern (1928–2020)
- Isaac Stern (1920–2001)
- Albert Stoessel (1894–1943)
- Pyotr Stolyarsky (1871–1944)
- Josef Suk (1929–2011)
- Harold Sumberg (1905–1994)
- Suwa Nejiko (1920–2012)
- Zoltán Székely (1903–2001)
- Henryk Szeryng (1918–1988)
- Joseph Szigeti (1892–1973)
- Robert Talbot (1893–1954)
- Gerhard Taschner (1922–1976)
- Vilmos Tátrai (1912–1999)
- Henri Temianka (1906–1992)
- Jean Ter-Merguerian (1935–2015)
- Jacques Thibaud (1880–1953)
- Felice Togni (1871–1929)
- Roman Totenberg (1911–2012)
- Andor Toth (1925–2006)
- Charles Treger (1935–2023)
- Anahit Tsitsikian (1926–1999)
- Masuko Ushioda (1942–2013)
- Carlo Van Neste (1914–1992)
- Tibor Varga (1921–2003)
- Franz von Vecsey (1893–1935)
- Sándor Végh (1912–1997)
- Ion Voicu (1923–1997)
- Edith Volckaert (1949–1992)
- Imre Waldbauer (1892–1952)
- Elisabeth Waldo (1918–2026)
- Winifred Merrill Warren (1898–1990)
- John Waterhouse (1877–1970)
- William Waterhouse (1917–2003)
- Clarence Cameron White (1880–1960)
- Elise Fellows White (1873–1953)
- Camilla Wicks (1928–2020)
- Margaret Jones Wiles (1911–2000)
- Maurice Wilk (1922–1963)
- Wanda Wiłkomirska (1929–2018)
- Trevor Williams (1929–2007)
- Harold Wippler (1928–2022)
- Endre Wolf (1913–2011)
- Josef Wolfsthal (1899–1931)
- Rowsby Woof (1883–1943)
- Cedric Wright (1889–1959)
- Arthur Wynne (1871–1945)
- Yuri Yankelevich (1909–1973)
- Florian ZaBach (1918–2006)
- Renato Zanettovich (1921–2021)
- Ede Zathureczky (1903–1959)
- Zvi Zeitlin (1922–2012)
- Grigori Zhislin (1945–2017)
- Efrem Zimbalist (1889–1985)
- Olive Zorian (1916–1965)
- Dénes Zsigmondy (1922–2014)
- Paul Zukofsky (1943–2017)

== Comedic ==
As a supplement to the lists above, the following is a list of violinists who were known for playing the instrument badly in support of comedy routines.

- Jack Benny (1894–1974)
- Larry Fine (1902–1975)
- Henny Youngman (1906–1998)

== Contemporary ==
- See List of contemporary classical violinists

== Female ==
- See List of female violinists
