= Biddulph Recordings =

English record label for classical music

Biddulph Records
- Founded: 1989
- Founder: Peter Biddulph; Eric Wen
- Country of origin: United Kingdom
- Location: Devon, England
- Official website: www.biddulphrecordings.co.uk

Biddulph Recordings is a record label based in Devon, England specialising in the restoration of historical performances, particularly by string musicians. It was founded in 1989 by violin dealer Peter Biddulph and Eric Wen, a musicologist and historian of string performances. In 2003, Sarah Woodward joined and has since overseen the historical vocal label Romophone. Biddulph Recordings’ honours include the Gramophone 1999 ICRC award for "Historical Recording of the Year".

== Historic reissues ==
The early Biddulph titles included the first digital reissues of recordings by Fritz Kreisler, Joseph Szigeti, Jacques Thibaud, and Yehudi Menuhin. By the mid-1990s, Biddulph Recordings had also released complete editions of Bronisław Huberman, Mischa Elman, Jan Kubelík, Henri Temianka, Toscha Seidel, Ossy Renardy, Lionel Tertis, William Primrose, Pablo Casals, and Ruggiero Ricci. The Biddulph label soon include historical piano recordings, with the first digital reissues of recordings by Alfred Cortot, Harold Bauer, and Percy Grainger, followed by Myra Hess, Moriz Rosenthal, Raoul Koczalski, Wilhelm Backhaus, and Shura Cherkassky. Biddulph later branched into historical orchestral and chamber music, reissuing the work of Willem Mengelberg, Serge Koussevitzky, Leopold Stokowski, Thomas Beecham, Max Fiedler, and Hermann Abendroth, as well as the Budapest String Quartet, the Busch Quartet, the Capet Quartet, and the Primrose Quartet.

== Original recordings ==
Biddulph Recordings has also produced a number of important original recordings. The first of these was the recital recording debut of violinist Maxim Vengerov, then an unknown 14-year-old prodigy. This was followed by Ruggiero Ricci’s accounts of the Beethoven and Brahms Concertos featuring 16 and 14 different cadenzas respectively (both concerto albums were tracked to enable the listener to choose which cadenza to program into each performance). Other new recordings on the Biddulph label include the Bach interpretations of pianist Edward Aldwell, and the violin performances of Oscar Shumsky, Aaron Rosand, and Arnold Steinhardt.
