= František Drdla =

Czech concert violinist and light music composer

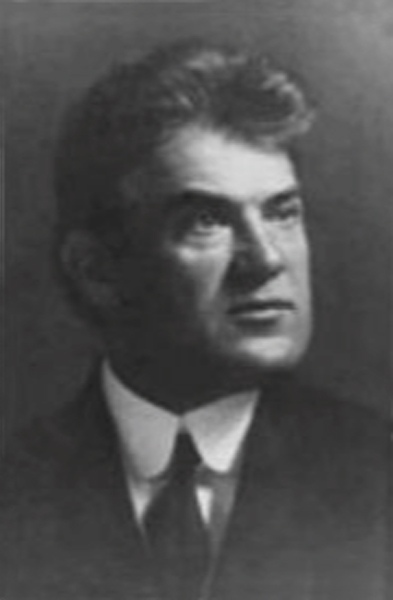
Drdla in 1928

František Alois Drdla (Germanised as Franz Drdla; 28 November 1868 – 3 September 1944) was a Czech concert violinist and composer of light music.

== Biography ==
Drdla was born in 1868 in Žďár nad Sázavou in Moravia, Austria-Hungary (now the Czech Republic). He studied violin and composition first at the Prague Conservatory and later at the Vienna Conservatory where his teachers were Joseph Hellmesberger Jr. for violin, Anton Bruckner for music theory and Franz Krenn for composition. However, Drdla's music shows none of his teachers' influences. From 1890 to 1893 he played violin in the orchestra of the Vienna Court Opera, and from 1894 to 1899 he pursued his career as the director and concertmaster of the Theater an der Wien. By then a well-known concert violinist, Drdla toured throughout Europe (1899–1905) and later the United States (1923–1925). Drdla enjoyed a good reputation as a violinist with a technically refined tone. In 1927 he received an honorary title from the President of Austria. Drdla died in Bad Gastein, Austria on 3 September 1944.

Although he composed three operettas, a violin concerto, several orchestral works and two piano trios, international fame came to Drdla as a result of composing lighter music in the late romantic style. These works generally mixed popular Bohemian (Czech) or Hungarian melodies and presented them à la viennoise. Among the best known of such works are Souvenir (1904), Vision (1906) and Hey, Hay! (1908) written for violin with piano. Hey, Hay! became popular in more than a dozen different versions including those for orchestra, piano quintet, and string quartet. Drdla's compositions were popularized by violinists Jan Kubelík, Marie Hall, Mischa Elman, Joseph Szigeti, Váša Příhoda and others.

== Selected works ==
=== Operetta ===
- Zlatá síť (The Golden Net) (1915–1916)
- Komtesa z prodejny (The Shop Countess / Die Ladenkomtesse), operetta in 3 acts (1916–1917)
- Bohyně lásky (The Goddess of Love / Die Göttin der Liebe), operetta burlesque in 3 acts (1940); revision of Zlatá síť

=== Orchestra ===
- Op. 134 – J'y Pense for orchestra, piano and harmonium (1914)

=== Concertante ===
- Op. 245 – Violin Concerto in D minor for violin and orchestra (1931)

=== Chamber music ===
- Op. 200 – Duo Concertante for violin, cello and piano (or violin and piano) (1924)
- Op. 240 – Piano Trio in G minor (1930)
- Op. 243 – Agnus Dei for voice, violin and piano

=== Violin and piano ===
- Serenade No.1 in A major for violin and piano (1901)
- Serenade No.2 in E major for violin and piano (1903)
- Romanze (Romance) in A major for violin and piano (1903)
- Souvenir in D major for violin and piano (1904)
- Op. 19 – Polonaise in G major for violin and piano (1904)
- Op. 21 – Träumerei (Dreaming) in D♭ major for violin and piano (1905)
- Op. 22 – Mazurka No.1 ("Marie Hall Mazurka") in G major for violin and piano (1905)
- Op. 23 – Mazurka No.2 in G major for violin and piano (1905)
- Op. 24 – Mazurka No.3 in A major for violin and piano (1906)
- Op. 25 – Madrigale in A major for violin and piano (1906)
- Op. 26 – Mélodie in F major and Au printemps in B♭ major for violin and piano (1908)
- Op. 27 – Dialogue in G major and Tarantelle in D major for violin and piano (1906)
- Op. 28 – Vision in E♭ major for violin and piano (1906)
- Op. 29 – Le Songe (Notturno) in D major for violin and piano
- Op. 30 – 8 Ungarische Tänze (8 Danses hongroises / 8 Hungarian Dances) for violin and piano (1908)

No.1 – Hej de Fényes
No.2 – Hamis babám
No.3 – Ég a kunhyó
No.4 – Hej, haj! (Hey Hay!) (1908); composed in several versions
No.5 – Kalvesai-emlék (Memories of Kalvesa)
No.6 – Bártfai-emlék (Memories of Bártfa)
No.7 – Rózsabokor csárdás (Rosebush Csárdás)
No.8 – Csak egy szép lány (There's Only One Lovely Girl) (1909)

- Op. 31 – Chant d’amour, Valse chanson in D major for violin and piano (1908)
- Op. 32 – Ivresse in F major for violin and piano (1908)
- Op. 33 – Berceuse (Wiegenlied / Lullaby), Intermezzo in C major for violin and piano (1908)
- Op. 34 – Méditation in C major, Ballade in G minor, Au soir in F major and Lenorka in G major for violin and piano (1909)
- Op. 35 – Danse des sorcières (Witches' Dance / Hexentanz) in G major for violin and piano (1908)
- Op. 36 – Idylle in A major for violin and piano
- Op. 37 – Rêverie in E♭ major, Frühlings-Serenade in A major and Feu follet in D major for violin and piano
- Op. 40 – Fantasie for violin and piano (1908)
- Op. 41 – Polichinelle for violin and piano (1908)
- Op. 42 – Waltz-Serenade in C major for violin and piano (1908)
- Op. 42 – Tarantella for 2 violins and piano (1909)
- Op. 43 – Chanson joyeuse in D major for violin and piano
- Op. 46 – Tendresse for violin and piano (1909)
- Op. 47 – Causerie for violin and piano (1908)
- Op. 48 – Illusion in G major for violin and piano (1908)
- Op. 50 – Danse gracieuse in G major for violin and piano
- Op. 51 – Intermezzo, Waltz in G major for violin and piano (1908)
- Op. 52 – Capriccio for violin and piano (1908)
- Op. 54 – Rococo in E major for violin and piano (1909)
- Op. 55 – Rezinka in D major for violin and piano
- Op. 56 – Berceuse for violin and piano (1910)
- Op. 57 – Ritornell in D major for violin and piano (1909)
- Op. 61 – Marche triomphale and Tarantelle for violin and piano (1910)
- Op. 62 – Scherzando for violin and piano (1910)
- Op. 65 – Poëme for violin and piano (1910)
- Op. 66 – Fantasie über 'Carmen' von Bizet (Fantasia on 'Carmen' by Bizet) for violin and piano (1909)
- Op. 67 – Canzonetta in B♭ major for violin and piano (1909)
- Op. 70 – Chant de la Fileuse in G major for violin and piano
- Op. 71 – Aubade d'été, Humoresque in F major for violin and piano (1910)
- Op. 73 – Fantasie über 'Hoffmanns Erzählungen' von Offenbach (Fantaisie sur 'Les contes d’Hoffmann' de Offenbach / Fantasia on 'The Tales of Hoffmann' by Offenbach) for violin and piano (1910)
- Op. 81 – Menuet in G major for violin and piano (1911)
- Op. 84 – Legende in A major for violin and piano (1911)
- Op. 86 – Novellette for violin and piano (1911)
- Op. 88 – Guitarrero for violin and piano (1912)
- Op. 90 – Colombine, Gavotte for violin and piano (1912)
- Op. 92 – La poupée, Menuet in G major for violin and piano (1912)
- Op. 93 – Temps passés for violin and piano (1912)
- Op. 95 – Aus der Heimat, Böhmische Volksweisen (Bohemian Airs) for violin and piano (1912)
- Op. 98 – Zwiegespräche (Dialogues) for 2 violins and piano (1913)

No.1 – Glückliche Stunden (G major)
No.2 – Spiel und Tanz (E minor)
No.3 – Treue Kameraden (D major)
No.4 – In der Plauderecke (A major)
No.5 – Tragische Geschichte (G minor)
No.6 – Froher Festtag (B♭ major)

- Op. 99 – Nocturne for violin and piano (1913)
- Op. 108 – Romance Bergère
- Op. 111 – Ariel for violin and piano (1913)
- Op. 112 – Tarantelle for violin and piano (1913)
- Op. 125 – The Hummingbird for violin and piano (1914)
- Op. 127 – 4 kleine Vortragstücke (4 Short Concert Pieces) (1915); includes: Rain of Blossoms, Night Winds
- Op. 131 – Otázka (Question / Frage) for violin and piano (1914)
- Op. 132 – Perpetuo
- Op. 142 – Fantasie nach Motiven der Oper 'Die verkaufte Braut' von Smetana (Fantaisie sur 'La finacée vendue' de Smetana / Fantasia on 'The Bartered Bride' of Smetana) (1915)
- Op. 154 – Bilder aus Ungarn, 5 Hungarian Folksongs for violin and piano (1917)
- Op. 180 – Graziella for violin and piano (1925)
- Op. 182 – Le trouvère for violin and piano (1925)
- Op. 183 – Notturno for violin and piano (1925)
- Op. 184 – D'automne for violin and piano (1925)
- Op. 186 – Pierette for violin and piano (1925)
- Op. 187 – Wiener Walzer (Valses Viennoises / Viennese Waltzes) (1925)
- Op. 189 – Ráno (Aubade) for violin and piano (1924)
- Op. 191 – Tarantella (1925)
- Op. 196 – Pagoda and Springbrunnen (The Fountain) for violin and piano (1927)
- Op. 197 – Katinka, Mazurka caractéristique for violin and piano (1927)
- Op. 199 – Danse espagnole for violin and piano (1927)
- Op. 201 – Lybellentanz (Dragonfly Dance) and Sylvan Dance for violin and piano (1925)
- Op. 225 – Concertino in A minor for violin and piano (1929)
- Op. 226 – Alt-Wien (Old Vienna) in A major for violin and piano (1930)
- Op. 228 – Sehnsucht (Longing) for violin and piano
- Op. 233 – Die Libelle (Libellule / The Dragonfly) in D major for violin and piano (1933)

== See also ==
- List of classical violinists
