= Ossy Renardy =

Austrian violinist

Ossy Renardy (26 April 1920 – 3 December 1953) was an Austrian classical violinist, who made a major impression in Europe before migrating to the United States at age 17. There he made the first complete recording of any version of the 24 Paganini Caprices. He became an American citizen and served in the US Army in World War II, giving almost 500 concerts for the troops. He returned to the concert stage after the war, but only five years into his adult career he was killed in a car crash in New Mexico, at the age of 33. He left a number of recordings.

== Biography ==
Oskar Reiss was born in Vienna in 1920, to non-musical parents who worked as waiters. His first and only teacher was the violin pedagogue Theodore Pashkus who, "while teaching one day, noticed a small, six-year-old boy in the street beneath the studio window. Pashkus, with unusually clear instinct, invited the little boy inside and placed a small violin in his hands. Indulgently, Pashkus gave the child his first music lesson and even in that first lesson, was so impressed with the remarkable grasp and intelligence of the youngster, that Pashkus decided to experiment with him. Within a few weeks of the informal free violin lessons he had begun so casually, Pashkus realized that at least, he had found the pupil of whom every teacher dreams, literally on his own doorstep".

Renardy later joined a touring variety troupe for a season in Merano, Italy, beginning on 27 October 1933. On the basis that a name less Germanic-sounding than Oskar Reiss, and one more Italianate-sounding, would be highly desirable, his manager suggested 'Ossi Renardi'. His performance of Schubert's A major Sonata and Paganini's D major concerto at the Merano Casino led to an extended tour of Italy. He returned to Vienna for more preparation, keeping his new name but modifying the spelling to Ossy Renardy. There he played at the Konzerthaus in May 1934, then returned to Italy, where in Milan he played under the baton of Victor de Sabata, who invited him to play with the Vienna Philharmonic. Then came his first tour of the Baltic countries, Norway, Denmark, Sweden, the Netherlands, Austria, France and once again Italy.

Renardy went to the United Kingdom in 1937, in order to escape Nazi oppression. He visited the United States the same year. This came about after the wife of an American concert promoter heard Renardy on Italian radio. His New York debut was at The Town Hall on 8 January 1938, after first touring the mid-west states. His regular accompanist from this time onwards was Walter Robert (born Robert Walter Spitz, 1908, Trieste, d. 1999 Bloomington IN; Robert later had a long artistic association with Josef Gingold).

At his Carnegie Hall debut on 10 October 1939, Ossy Renardy made an extraordinary impression when he played the Lalo Symphonie espagnole, the Concerto in E minor by Nardini, and the Sonatina in G by Dvořák in the first half, and after interval played all 24 solo Caprices by Paganini. He was aged 19 at the time. The following year (1940) he made the world premiere recording of the complete Caprices (albeit in an arrangement for violin and piano by Ferdinand David, the piano part played by Walter Robert; the first recording of the Caprices in their original solo violin form was not till 1947, by Ruggiero Ricci). This was the first of Renardy's many recordings; his last recording, made shortly before his death in 1953, was a second reading of the 24 Caprices, again in the arrangement by Ferdinand David. The Guarnerius violin he played was said to have been once owned by Paganini himself, but other sources suggest it was a later copy by Jean-Baptiste Vuillaume. (Renardy's Guarnerius is now owned by an anonymous Australian and is permanently loaned to Richard Tognetti, conductor and principal violinist of the Australian Chamber Orchestra.)

Renardy was already playing for the USO in 1941, and the following year he enlisted in the United States Army, becoming an American citizen in 1943. Throughout the war he appeared in 490 USO concerts for the entertainment of American troops.

After the war he studied in New York with the famous pedagogues Theodore and Alice Pashkus in order to prepare himself for appearing anew on the stage. In 1947 he returned to the concert stage, and appeared with many of the major orchestras of North America, Europe and Israel. In 1949 he married his sweetheart Suzette Guttwirth, whom he had met in Vienna in 1936.

Ossy Renardy was killed in a road accident on 3 December 1953, aged only 33. His accompanist George Robert (b. 1919 Vienna, d. 2006 Albuquerque NM; no relation to his regular accompanist Walter Robert) was driving him from their last concert at Las Cruces, New Mexico, en route to their next engagement in Monte Vista, Colorado. At Tres Piedras near Santa Fe, their car skidded on an ice slick and, while out of control, was hit by another car coming in the opposite direction. George Robert and the other motorists were not seriously injured, and Renardy's Guarnerius was not damaged.

This was regarded as a great loss to the musical world at the time. Gramophone's obituary of March 1954 said: "At thirty-three he seemed destined to don the mantle of his compatriot Kreisler, whose style of playing was not dissimilar".

== Recordings ==
=== Concerto ===
Ossy Renardy's sole concerto recording with orchestra was the Brahms Concerto in D major, with the Concertgebouw Orchestra of Amsterdam under Charles Munch, made on 27 June 1948. At the time of release, this recording was considered worthy of comparison to those of Heifetz, Szigeti, Neveu and Menuhin. Irving Kolodin reviewed the set in "The New Guide To Recorded Music" (Doubleday (publisher), New York, 1950), saying "There is no single merit in the Renardy to give it precedence over the Szigeti or Heifetz or Neveu, save a richer serving of the colors in the score than previously provided by any source. However, Renardy's is a very live, youthful, and ingratiating performance, which has its own authentic alertness, consistently controlled. The Munch background is extremely good."

Charles Munch was one of Ossy Renardy's greatest admirers, saying of him, "There is only one word to describe him: perfection. He has everything - style, technique and tone, combined in the most splendid manner".

=== Other recordings ===
Walter Robert was Renardy's principal accompanist both in recordings and in concert. Other accompanists he used in recordings included Eugene List and Ernest Lush.

His other recordings include:

- J. S. Bach:
  - Sonata for solo violin No 1 in G minor, BWV 1001
  - Sonata for solo violin No 3 in C major, BWV 1005
- Johannes Brahms: F-A-E Sonata - Allegro in C minor (Walter Robert, piano)
- Burmester: Viennese Serenade (Walter Robert, piano)
- Arcangelo Corelli: Sonata No. 8 in E minor (Leo Taubman, piano)
- Antonín Dvořák:
  - Ballade in D minor, Op. 15/1, B. 139 (Walter Robert, piano)
  - Sonatina in G major, Op. 100, B. 183 (Walter Robert, piano)
  - Slavonic Dance in G minor, Op. 46/8 (Walter Robert, piano)
- Heinrich Wilhelm Ernst: Hungarian Airs, Op. 22 (Walter Robert, piano)
- César Franck: Violin Sonata in A (Eugene List, piano)
- George Frideric Handel, arr. Carl Flesch: Prayer (Walter Robert, piano)
- Fritz Kreisler:
  - Liebesfreud, Liebesleid (Ernest Lush, piano)
  - Caprice viennois, Tambourin chinois (Ernest Lush, piano)
- Wolfgang Amadeus Mozart: Adagio in E, K. 261 (Walter Robert, piano)
- Niccolò Paganini:
  - 24 Caprices for solo violin (arr. violin and piano by Ferdinand David) (Walter Robert, piano)
  - 24 Caprices for solo violin (arr. David) (Eugene Helmer, piano)
  - Caprice No. 17 in E-flat major (arr. Fuchs); Caprice No. 24 in A minor (arr. Carl Flesch) (Ernest Lush, piano)
  - Sonata No. 12 in E minor (Walter Robert, piano)
  - "Le streghe", Theme and Variations, Op. 8 (Ernest Lush, piano)
- Piatti: Sonata No. 1 in E minor (Walter Robert, piano)
- Maurice Ravel: Violin Sonata (Eugene List, piano)
- Camille Saint-Saëns: Violin Concerto No. 1 in A major, arr. violin and piano (Walter Robert, piano)
- Pablo de Sarasate:
  - Zorzico, Adios montaños mias, Op. 37 (Walter Robert, piano)
  - Danzas Españolas No. 6 (Walter Robert, piano)
  - Romanza Andaluza and Jota Navarra, Op. 22 (Walter Robert, piano)
  - Zapateado, Op. 23, No. 2 (Walter Robert, piano)
- Franz Schubert:
  - Sonatina No. 1 in D major, Op. posth. 137/1, D. 384 (Walter Robert, piano)
  - Sonatina No. 3 in G minor, Op. posth. 137.3, D. 408 - 3rd, 4th movements (Walter Robert, piano)
- Schubert arr. August Wilhelmj: Ave Maria, D. 839 (Ernest Lush, piano)
- Franz von Vecsey: Caprice No. 2 in F-sharp major, "Cascade" (Walter Robert, piano)
- Henryk Wieniawski: Scherzo-Tarantelle in G minor, Op. 16 (Ernest Lush, piano)
- Aleksander Zarzycki: Mazurka in G, Op. 26 (Walter Robert, piano)
