= Alfredo D'Ambrosio =

Italian composer and violinist

Alfredo d'Ambrosio (13 June 1871 – 28 December 1914) was an Italian composer and violinist. He studied under Enrico Bossi at the Conservatory San Pietro a Majella in Naples, and later with Pablo de Sarasate in Madrid and August Wilhelmj in London. He then settled in Nice, rue de Russie 2, and afterwards in Paris, Boulevard de Courcelle 71, and devoted himself to his compositions and his work as a teacher. His cousin Luigi d'Ambrosio was also a violinist and later teacher of Salvatore Accardo. Alfredo D'Ambrosio died in Paris, aged 43. His wife was Blanche Aida Malvano; he had three sons, one of them, Violette d’Ambrosio was a concert violinist and played until mid ‘900, often performing her father's Violin Concertos.

== Works ==
Born in Naples, Alfredo d'Ambrosio is the author of the opera Pia de' Tolomei, based on Dante Alighieri's Divine Comedy, the ballet Hersilia, two violin concertos, a string quartet in c minor, Op. 42 (1908) and a quintet, as well as various concert pieces for violin and piano, which had a certain popularity in the early 20th century. His first violin concerto (in B minor, Op. 29, dedicated to Arrigo Serato) was written from April to October 1903 and premiered in Berlin, at the presence of the Emperor, on 29 October 1904, with Berlin Philharmonic conducted by August Scharrer. The second violin concerto (in G minor, Op. 51, dedicated to Jacques Thibaud) was premiered by Georges Enesco on 6 April 1913 in Paris, Salle Gaveau, conducted by the composer.

His best-known work is his Canzonetta, Op. 6, which he recorded in 1907. More recordings of this piece were made in 1914 by Alexander Petschnikoff (1873–1948), in 1921 by Mischa Elman, and in 1924 by Toscha Seidel and Georg Kulenkampff. In addition, there is also his Serenade, Op. 4 recorded in 1919 by Jascha Heifetz and by George Enescu in 1924, Madrigale op.26 by Karl Grigorowicz in 1909, Serenata op.40 by Efrem Zimbalist in 1917 and by Wolfgang Schneiderhan in 1990, Aubade op.17 and Nocturne op.35 by Christeta Goñi in 1912, Romance Op.9 by Renée Chemet, Bronislaw Mittman, Jan Kubelik; Novelletta op.20 by Leon Zighera, Introduction et Humoresque Op.25 by Sasha Jacobsen in 1914, A ton reveil by Alfred Dubois. Alfredo d'Ambrosio himself recorded on '78 rpm records APGA these pieces: Chanson napolitaine Op. 37, Sonnet allègre Op.35, Humoresque op.25, Ariette Op.23,Romance Op.9, Mélancolie Op.37, Aria Op.22 (dedicated to Jan Kubelik), Canzonetta Op.6, Seconda Canzonetta-Little Song Op.28. Both his Violin Concertos were performed and recorded on a DVD Achord Pictures in Lucca, on 7 October 2018 (soloists Laura Bortolotto and Christian Sebastianutto, conductor Alan Freiles). Both Violin Concertos are on NAXOS Videolibrary. Jean-Jacques Kantorow and Orchestre de Douai conducted by Arie van Beck recorded both "Violin Concertos" by d’Ambrosio in 2021 and 2022-cd "Soupir éditions" S256, together with "First and Second Canzonetta","Romance","Introduction et Humoresque","Sérénade", for Violin and Piano (pianist Haruko Ueda). 13 pieces for Violins and Piano, dedicated by their Author to famous musicians or friends, were recorded in December 2021 in Hungary (Gödollö) by Lucilla Rose Mariotti-violin- and Zsuzsanna Homor-piano, on a DVD Achord Pictures. The complete list of Alfredo d'Ambrosio compositions for Violin and Piano has been recorded on 3 cds by Gran Duo Italiano (Mauro Tortorelli violin and Angela Meluso piano) for Brilliant Classics in 2022.
