= Endre Wolf =

Hungarian classical violinist

Endre Wolf (6 November 1913 – 29 March 2011) was a Hungarian classical violinist, born in Budapest. He performed the works of Pyotr Ilyich Tchaikovsky, Mozart, Johann Sebastian Bach, Beethoven and many others.

== Biography ==
=== Early life ===
Wolf was born in Budapest to a Jewish family from Chernivtsi in Ukraine and raised in Hungary. His mother was a seamstress and his father a watchmaker from Chernivtsi, Ukraine. When he was four, Wolf persuaded his parents to buy him a violin and he was taught by the well known Hungarian musician Jenő Hubay along with Leó Weiner. He received his musical education at the Franz Liszt Academy of Music and in 1936 was offered a post at the Gothenburg Symphony Orchestra in Sweden. The Hungarian police refused to give him a passport but after his aunt showed them a letter from Gothenburg and told them, "Here is another opportunity to get rid of a Jew", he was allowed to leave Hungary to spend the war in neutral Sweden and emigrate to England after the war.

=== Later life ===
Between 1954 and 1964, Wolf was a professor at the Academy of Music in Manchester and was elected to the Royal Academy of Music in 1973. He made appearances in the Henry Wood Proms and Royal Albert Hall in London. Endre Wolf played on a violin by Omobono Stradavari. He married twice, first to a German woman named Antoinette which ended in divorce during his time in Manchester and second to violinist Jennifer Nuttall-Wolf who was a professor at the Malmö Academy of Music. Wolf died in Sweden in 2011, aged 97.

== See also ==
- List of classical violinists
