= Dragomir Krančević =

Serbian violinist (1847–1929)

Dragomir Krančević Драгомир Кранчевић
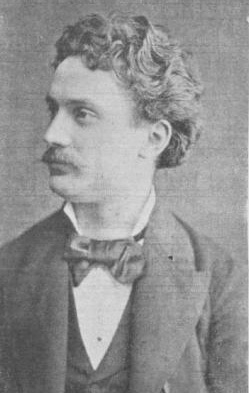
- Photo of Krančević
- Born: 4 October 1847; Pančevo, Austrian Empire
- Died: 19 May 1929 (aged 81); Vienna, Austria
- Education: University of Music and Performing Arts Vienna, Vienna
- Known for: Violin
- Elected: Vienna State Opera; Royal Hungarian National Theater; Krančević Quartet; Royal Hungarian Opera

Dragomir Krančević (Serbian Cyrillic: Драгомир Кранчевић, Hungarian: Dragomir Krancsevics; 4 October 1847 – 19 May 1929) was a Serbian violinist in Austria-Hungary.

== Early life and education ==
Born in Pančevo, Banat Military Frontier, Austrian Empire, Krančević was the son of a wealthy and respected merchant's family from Pančevo (Hungarian: Pancsova). He attended the primary school and the gymnasium of his native place. The little boy received his first violin lessons during the school education. Karl Heisler, his private violin instructor of Danube Swabian origin, recommended further promotion of his musical talent in Vienna. At the age of ten, Krančević arrived in the capital city of the Austrian Empire and continued his education. In 1859, he completed the entrance examination at the Viennese Conservatory of the Gesellschaft der Musikfreunde. Joseph Hellmesberger Sr. immediately recognized his extraordinary talent and accepted him as a student. Due to the fact that his professor, with whose family he lived during his studies, was surrounded by numerous wellknown composers and musicians, Krančević was able to meet Anton Rubinstein, Johannes Brahms, Hans von Bülow, Clara Schumann, Joseph Joachim, and work with composers like Franz Liszt, Johannes Brahms, Gustav Mahler or Karl Goldmark.

== Career ==
In 1861, Krančević gave his first public performance in Pančevo, a charity concert for the benefit of the city hospital. In March 1862, he made his Viennese debut at the ballroom of the old Musikverein's building, a charity concert in favor of the Serbian Orthodox Church. Until the end of his studies in 1867, the young man gave several charity performances with the Hellmesberger Quartet in favor of the Concordia Association of Writers and other Viennese organizations at the Theater am Franz-Josefs-Kai, the Sofiensaal and the Redoutensäle of the Hofburg Palace.

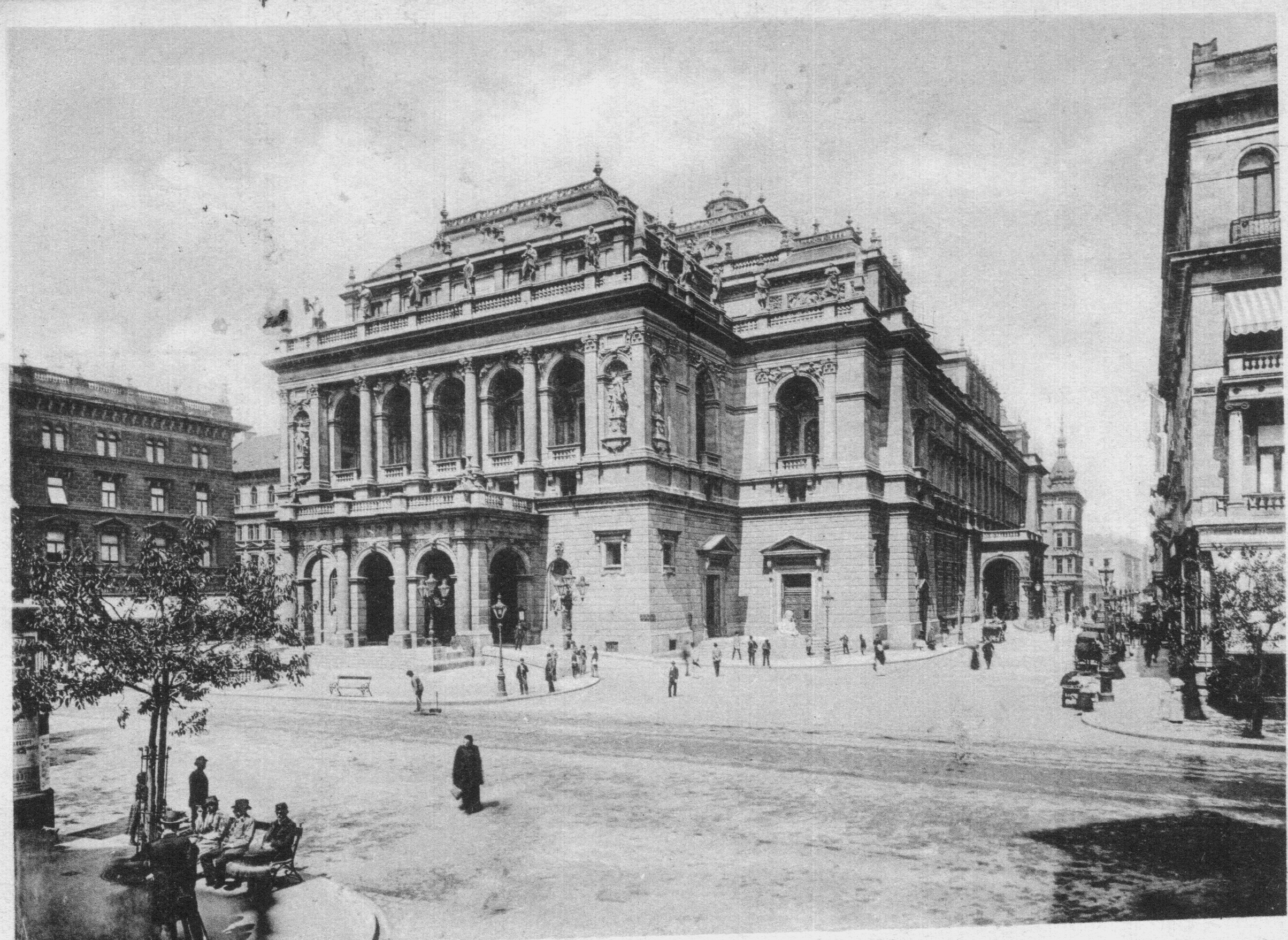
Royal Hungarian Opera, Budapest

At the beginning of his career, Krančević was given the position of concertmaster of the Vienna State Opera as the only member of the ensemble who comes from Southeast Europe. Although he had to leave the Opera due to numerous solo concerts, he often played with the Vienna Philharmonic orchestra as a guest performer. Especially at the time when the orchestra was conducted by Felix Otto Dessoff (1860-1875) and Hans Richter (1875-1898). The young violinist became a recognized virtuoso and he performed in concert tours, which led him to Linz, Bad Ischl, Salzburg, Prague, Leipzig, Bratislava, Belgrade, Novi Sad and many other cities. A highlight during his concert tour of 1872 was a multi-day celebration with Davorin Jenko, the First Belgrade Singing Society and other artists in honor of the beginning of Milan IV Obrenovic's reign. He was enthusiastically acclaimed by the audience after his performances at the Serbian National Theater during two summer evenings.

In 1873, at the invitation of Hans Richter, he became a member and the concertmaster of the Royal Hungarian National Theater/State Opera orchestra in Budapest. In addition to his performances with orchestra, in 1876, the Serbian violinist founded the "Krančević Quartet" with which he would perform for almost 20 years. The quartet became one of the leading chamber ensembles in Hungary. One year later, Krančević declined an invitation to become a professor at the Vienna Conservatory as the successor of Joseph Hellmesberber. Instead, he continued his career and in 1888, after the opera section moved from the Theatre building into the new Hungarian State Opera House, Krančević was appointed first concertmaster of the Royal Hungarian Opera Orchestra during the tenure of Gustav Mahler.

His performances were highly praised, as evidenced by the article from Österreichische Musiker-Zeitung which, after Krančević's concert with the Vienna Philharmonic in 1876, said that he played "in an enchantingly beautiful manner. Free of all cloying and mannered playing, he made an impression with his fine, rich, and beautiful tone, his impeccable skills, and his warm and striking performance".

== Later years and death ==
Krančević finished his career in 1901, retired into private life and went back to Vienna. His departure from the orchestra was greeted with expressions of great sadness and respect. Pester Lloyd announced on that occasion:

"One of the most prominent and distinguished artistic figures is leaving the Royal Opera House at the end of this season. The first concertmaster of the opera orchestra, Mr. Dragomir Krancevics, will appear at his stand for the last time tomorrow, Tuesday, and will retire after twenty-eight years of service. He is leaving this important position at such a sprightly age that one would be happy to keep him back (...) He is accompanied by the warmest sympathies of the orchestra members, for whom he was an ideal colleague, and of the countless music lovers who appreciated his art. Krancsevics is a noble master of the violin and a finely trained musician, with a profound musical nature. What a silver, singing tone he drew from his Guarneri, how his performance flowed in clear, noble lines when he occasionally appeared as a soloist in earlier years! As a concertmaster, he was fully absorbed in his profession; he had a conscientiousness, a deep devotion to duty, and a musical accuracy that was hard to match. This could certainly be appreciated only by his closer colleagues and, especially, by the conductors, who were so much more relaxed when they knew that Krancsevics was at the first stand on their left. He was an excellent leader of the violinists of the opera theatre, with unconditional reliability even in the most delicate assignments, and with an astonishing rhythmic sensitivity, which spread to the whole group in a flash. His musical talent was revealed at an early age. (...) On Hans Richter's urgent recommendation, he came to the National Theatre as a concertmaster barely twenty-six years old. When he debuted soon afterwards in a philharmonic concert with Spohr's Gesangsszene, the audience was instantly enchanted. He soon became a highly respected person in the musical life of Budapest, first forming a trio with the pianist Willy Deutsch and the cello virtuoso Ruhoff, and then becoming the leader of the quartet named after him. For almost two decades, he was a unique and enthusiastic interpreter of chamber music literature, presenting masterpieces to the Budapest audience in perfectly formed, stylish renditions. Even in the Opera House, one occasionally had the opportunity to enjoy his exquisite art as, for example, in the Elegy of Hubay's ‘Geigenmacher von Cremona’ or when he played the obligato part of the viola d’amore in Erkel's ‘Bánk bán’ or in the ‘Huguenots’ so poetically. Now, as concertmaster Krancsevics retires to private life, we also bid him a heartfelt farewell, meant for the noble artist as well as for the loveable human being".

In Vienna Krančević lived from violin classes, very withdrawn from the society and the artist no longer appeared publicly. In 1922, he sold his Guarneri violin to Jan Kubelík for twenty-five thousand Czech crowns because of his personal life situation during the Austrian economic crisis. Krančević died in Vienna, aged 81. One of the leading Austrian newspapers, Neues Wiener Journal, published his obituary mentioning his "brilliant musicality and virtuoso mastery” while describing him as "one of the most remarkable human beings who ever lived among us, an artist, a philosopher, a misannthrope at the same time, seemingly an unusual person, in reality wise and intelligent, a man who was hit hard by fate, but who never wanted to admit it".

The archive of the Institute of Musicology of the Serbian Academy of Sciences and Arts preserves some personal materials of Krančević's legacy including some postcards and letters to the violinist, written by Johannes Brahms and a few other artists of that time.

His nephew Petar Krančević (1869-1919) was a composer and choirmaster of the Serbian Singing Society of Sremska Mitrovica.
