= Maria Wilhelmj =

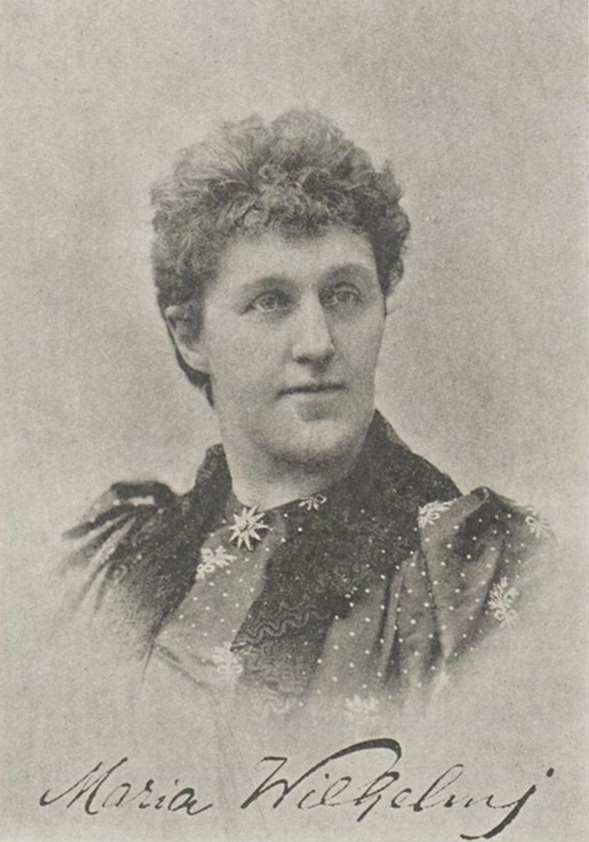
Maria Wilhelmj (ca. 1896)

Composer and soprano Maria Gastell Wilhelmj (27 July 185? – 27 February 1930) was born in Mainz, Germany. Sources disagree about whether she was born in 1851 or 1856. She studied piano and music theory with Theodor Leschetitzky, and voice with Pauline Viardot. She married the lawyer Albert Wilhelmj, whose brother was the violinist and arranger August Wilhelmj.

Wilhelmj made her debut as a singer with the Berlin Philharmonic on 18 March 1889 and probably sang at the Louisiana Purchase Exposition (World's Fair) in St. Louis, Missouri, in 1904. In addition to performing, she taught and composed. Her compositions were published by Heinrichshofen Verlag, and include:

== Works ==
=== Chamber music ===
- Andante (for violin and piano)

== Vocal works ==
- Das Röslein und der Schmetterling
- Dass du mich liebst, das wusst' ich
- Ich denke dein
