= Alexandre Boucher =

French violinist (1778–1861)

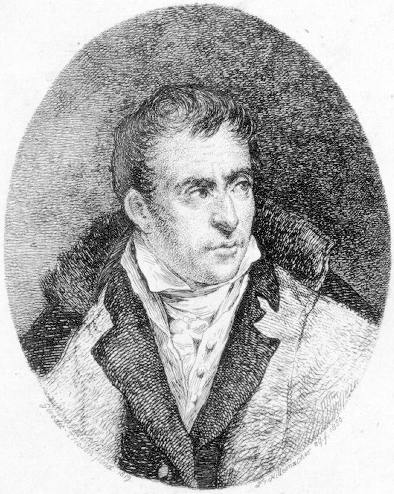
Alexandre Boucher, c. 1850

Alexandre Boucher (11 April 1778 – 29 December 1861) was a French violinist who performed throughout Europe; he was noted for having a resemblance to Napoleon.

== Early life ==
Boucher was born in Paris. He had an interest in music at an early age; he was a pupil of Navoigille l'Aîné, and aged eight he played at les Concert Spirituels. In 1787 he went to Madrid, where he was solo violinist to King Charles IV of Spain. During his time in Madrid he met Luigi Boccherini with whom he played chamber music. He married Céleste Gallyot, a harpist and pianist to the king. After his return to Paris he became successful.

In 1808 Charles IV of Spain was forced to abdicate, and he was kept prisoner at Fontainbleu by Napoleon; Boucher visited him there, and directed a small group of musicians that played for the former king.

== Performances in Europe ==
From about 1820 he travelled through Europe. His talent as a violinist was acknowledged, but he was regarded as a musical charlatan. The violinist and composer Louis Spohr met him in Brussels in 1819; he wrote: "His face bore a remarkable likeness to Napoleon Bonaparte's, and he had evidently carefully studied the banished emperor's way of bearing himself, lifting his hat, taking 'snuff,' etc..... He played a Haydn quartet, but he added so many ornaments of bad taste, that it was impossible to derive any pleasure from it."

Boucher encouraged the idea that he was exiled from France because his likeness to Napoleon might arouse sympathies for the former emperor.

In 1821 the composer Carl Maria von Weber conducted a concert in Berlin, in which Boucher was a performer, playing Weber's Variations on a Norwegian Air, to which he added his own cadenza:

At a wave from Boucher, Weber stopped; and he and the astounded public suddenly heard tremolandos, pizzicatos and other coarser tricks... then a whole firework display.... Finally, after highly extravagant modulations, arpeggios and other pieces of tightrope walking, the good fellow lost his balance completely and could find no way of getting back to the original piece – so, as if inspired from above, he dropped his violin and leapt upon the stupified, half irritated, half amused Weber, embraced him in front of everyone and shouted with a loud voice, as if choked with tears, "Ah grand maître! que j'aime, que j'admire!"

In April 1822 he visited Ludwig van Beethoven; at the occasion, the composer wrote for Boucher a piece for two violins (WoO 34 in the Kinsky–Halm Catalogue).

In 1844 he returned to France and settled in Orléans. He died in Paris in 1861.

== See also ==
- List of classical violinists
