= Joseph Szigeti =

Hungarian violinist (1892–1973)

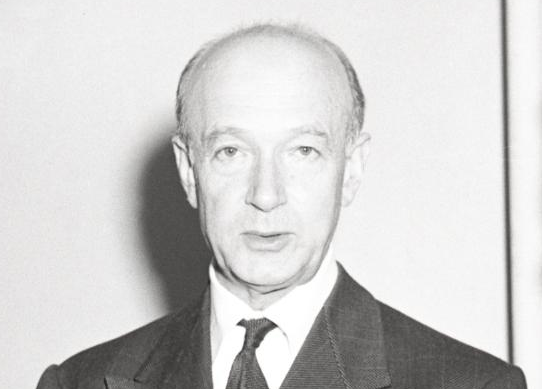
Joseph Szigeti

Joseph Szigeti (Hungarian: Szigeti József, [ˈsiɡɛti ˈjoːʒɛf]; 5 September 1892 – 19 February 1973) was a Hungarian violinist.

Born into a musical family, he spent his early childhood in a small town in Transylvania. He quickly proved himself to be a child prodigy on the violin, and moved to Budapest with his father to study with the renowned pedagogue Jenő Hubay. After completing his studies with Hubay in his early teens, Szigeti began his international concert career. His performances at that time were primarily limited to salon-style recitals and the more overtly virtuosic repertoire; however, after making the acquaintance of pianist Ferruccio Busoni, he began to develop a much more thoughtful and intellectual approach to music that eventually earned him the nickname "The Scholarly Virtuoso".

Following a bout of tuberculosis that required a stay in a sanatorium in Switzerland, Szigeti settled in Geneva, where he became Professor of Violin at the local conservatory in 1917. It was in Geneva that he met his future wife, Wanda Ostrowska, and at roughly the same time he became friends with the composer Béla Bartók. Both relationships were to be lifelong.

From the 1920s until 1960, Szigeti performed regularly around the world and recorded extensively. He also distinguished himself as a strong advocate of new music, and was the dedicatee of many new works by contemporary composers. Among the more notable pieces written for him are Ernest Bloch's Violin Concerto, Bartók's Rhapsody No. 1, and Eugène Ysaÿe's Solo Sonata No. 1. After retiring from the concert stage in 1960, he worked at teaching and writing until his death in 1973, at the age of 80.

== Early life and education ==
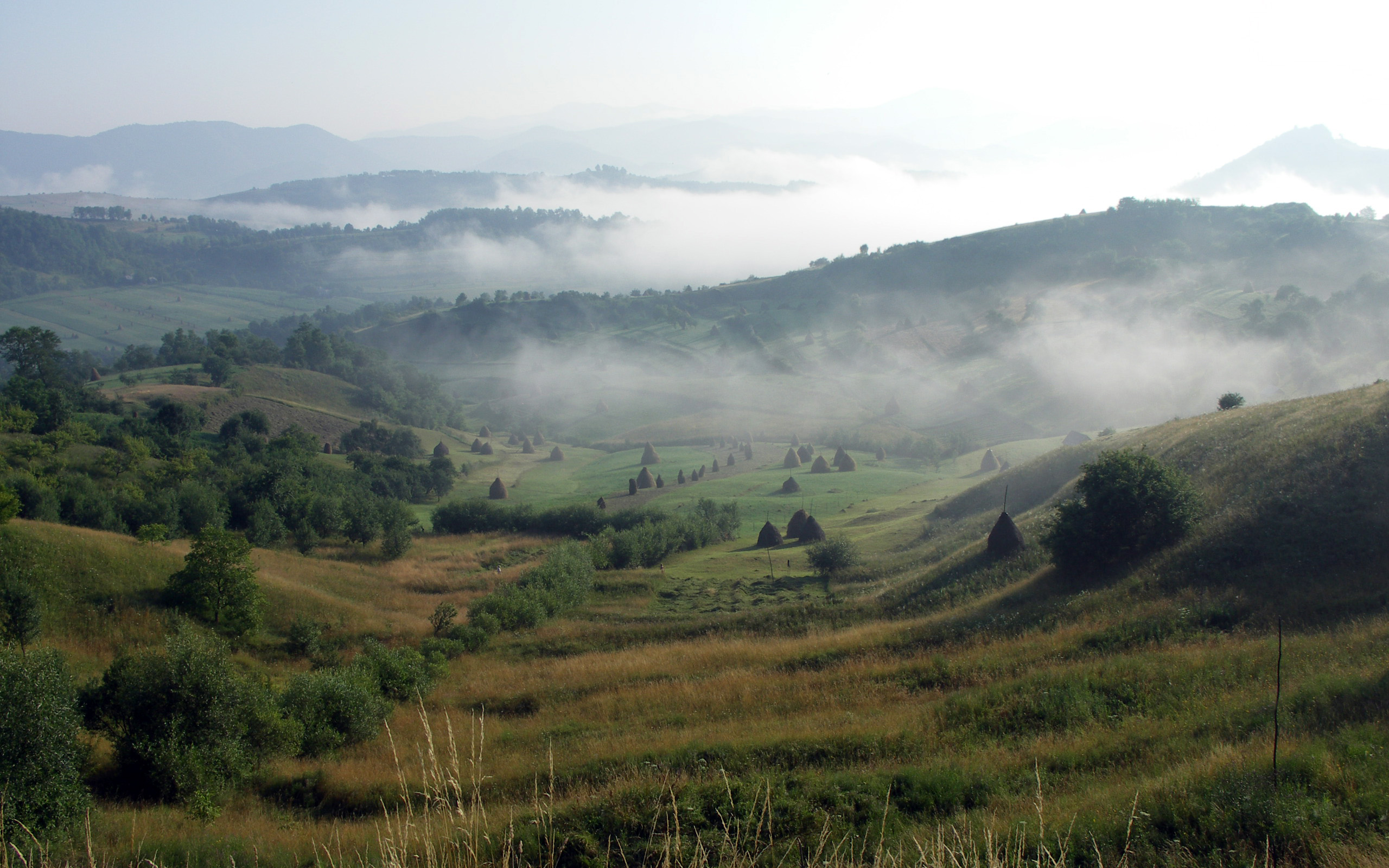
Scene from Máramaros county, near Szigeti's childhood home

Szigeti was born Joseph "Jóska" Singer to a Jewish family in Budapest, Austria-Hungary. His mother died when he was three years old, and soon thereafter the boy was sent to live with his grandparents in the little Carpathian town of Máramaros-Sziget (hence the name Szigeti). He grew up surrounded by music, as the town band was composed almost entirely of his uncles. After a few informal lessons on the cimbalom from his aunt, he received his first lessons on the violin from his Uncle Bernat at the age of six.

Szigeti quickly showed a talent for the violin. Several years later, his father took him to Budapest to receive proper training at the conservatory. After a brief stint with an inadequate teacher, Szigeti auditioned at the Franz Liszt Academy of Music and was admitted directly into the class of Jenő Hubay, without the usual delays and formalities.

Hubay, who had been a student of Joseph Joachim in Berlin, had by that time established himself as one of the preeminent teachers in Europe and a fountainhead of the Hungarian violin tradition. Szigeti joined such violinists as Franz von Vecsey, Emil Telmányi, Jelly d'Arányi and Stefi Geyer in Hubay's studio.

"Preludio" from J.S. Bach's Partita No. 3 in E major
The young Szigeti. Recorded 1908.

== Career ==
=== Child prodigy ===
During this period, Europe saw a notable number of child prodigies, influenced in part by the success of the Czech violinist Jan Kubelík and supported by rigorous instruction and active parental involvement. The studio of Jenő Hubay was no exception; Joseph Szigeti and other students gave frequent performances in recitals and salon concerts while studying at the Liszt Academy of Music.

He went to study at the Conservatory in Budapest for 2 years before his debut.

In 1905, at the age of thirteen, Szigeti made his Berlin debut playing Bach's Chaconne in D minor, Ernst's Concerto in F-sharp minor, and Paganini's Witches Dance. Despite the formidable program, the event received mention only by a photograph in the Sunday supplement of the Berliner Tageblatt captioned: "A Musical Prodigy: Josef Szigeti".

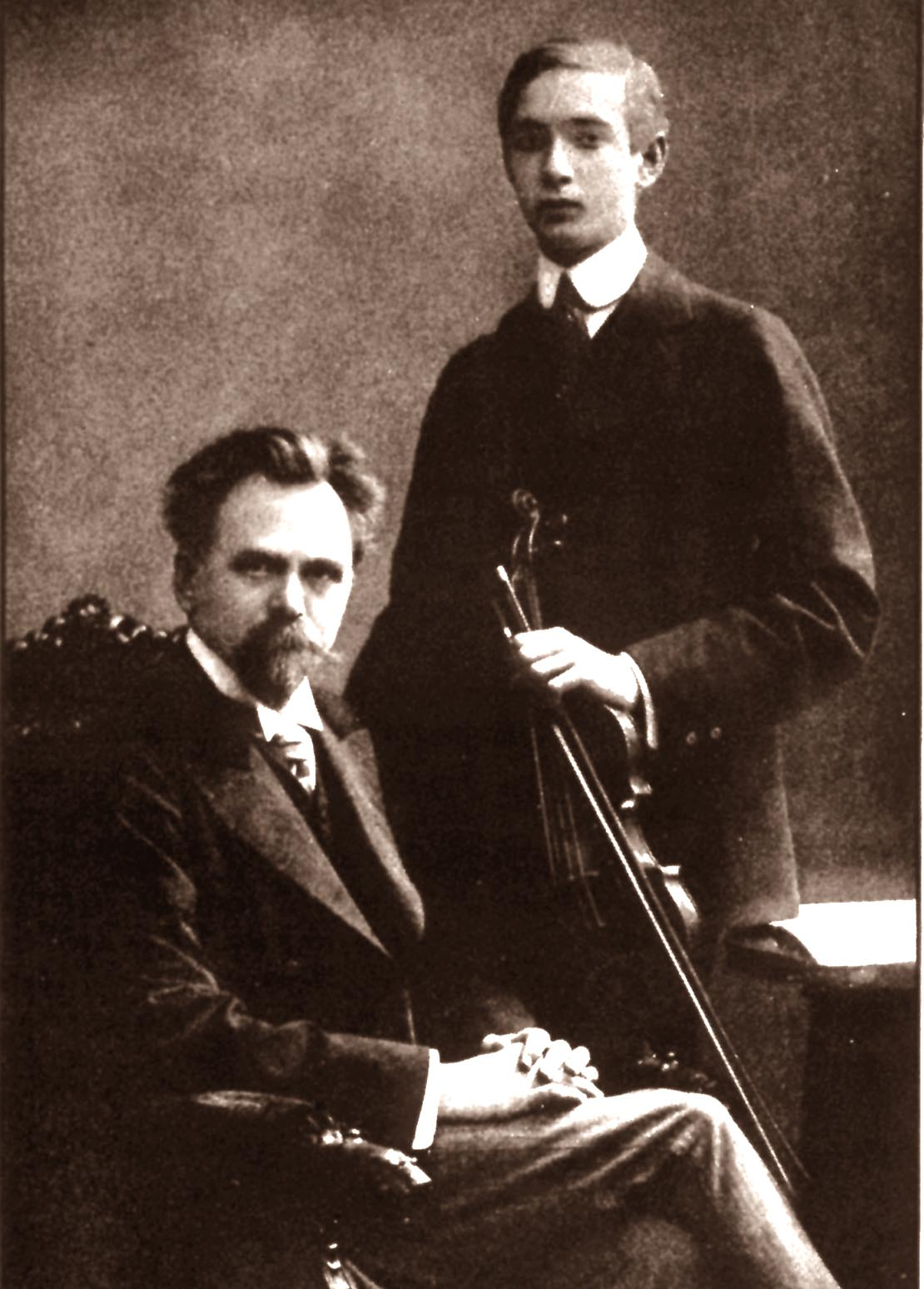
Hubay (left) and Szigeti, c. 1910

Szigeti spent the next few months with a summer theater company in a small Hungarian resort town, playing mini-recitals in between acts of folk operetta. In that same vein, the next year he played at a circus in Frankfurt, where he appeared under the pseudonym "Jóska Szulagi". Also in 1906, Hubay took Szigeti to play for Joseph Joachim in Berlin. Joachim was impressed, and suggested that Szigeti should finish his studies with him. Szigeti declined the offer, both out of loyalty to Hubay and a perceived aloofness and lack of rapport between Joachim and his students.

=== Broadening horizons ===
Soon after the meeting with Joachim, Szigeti embarked on a major concert tour of England. Midway through the tour, in Surrey, he met a music-loving couple who effectively adopted him, extending an invitation to stay with them for an indefinite length of time.

Throughout England, he gave many successful concerts, including the premiere of the first work dedicated to him: Hamilton Harty's Violin Concerto. Also during this time, Szigeti toured with an all-star ensemble including legendary singer Dame Nellie Melba and pianists Ferruccio Busoni and Wilhelm Backhaus. Philippe Gaubert, a famous French flutist of the day, as well as the young singer John McCormack, were also part of these tours.

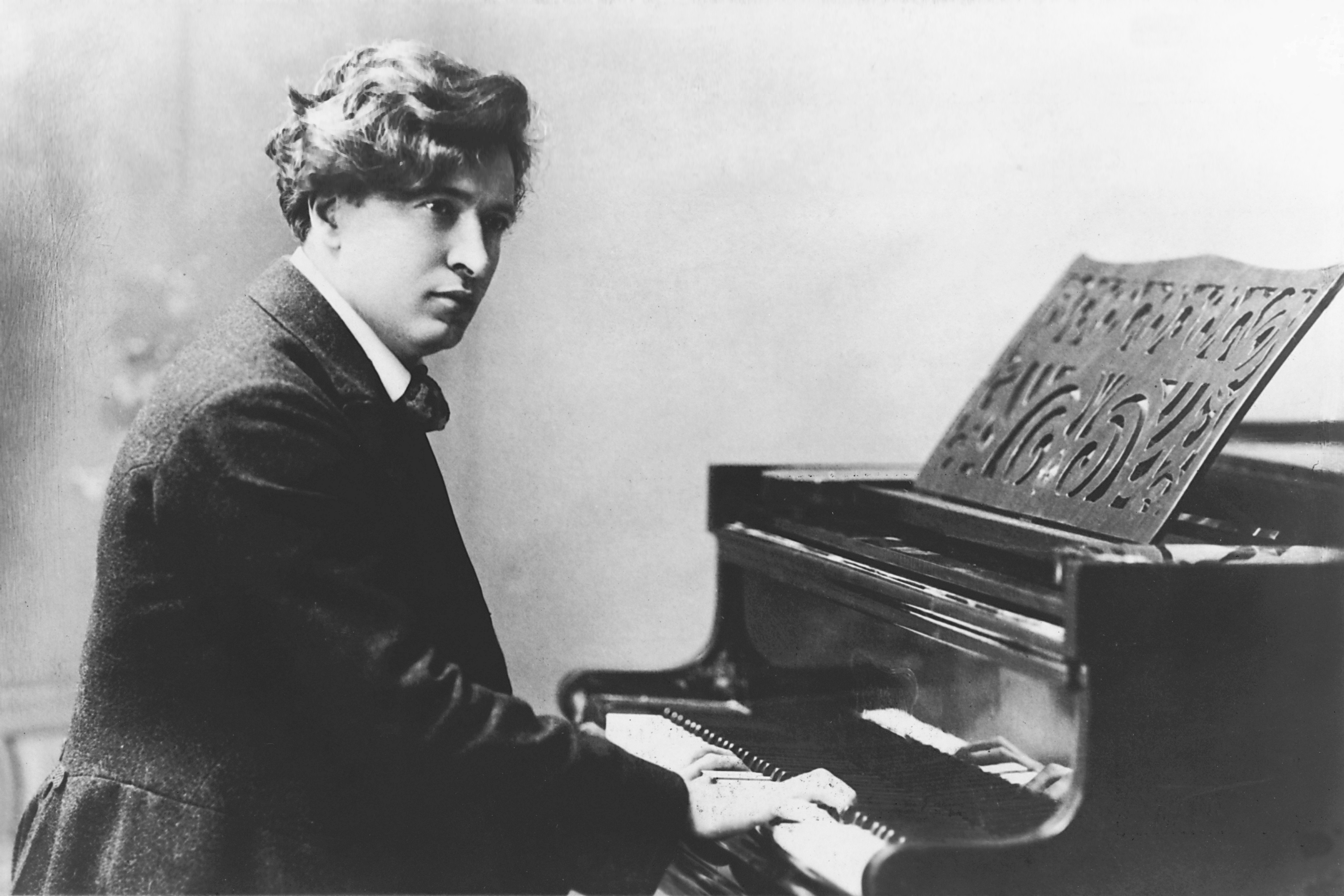
Szigeti's mentor, Ferruccio Busoni

The most significant of the new contacts was Busoni. The great pianist and composer became Szigeti's mentor during these formative years, and the two would remain close friends until Busoni's death in 1924. By Szigeti's own admission, before meeting Busoni his life was characterized by a certain laziness and indifference brought on by the then-typical life of a young prodigy violinist. He had grown accustomed to playing crowd-pleasing salon miniatures and dazzling virtuosic encores without much thought. He knew little of the works of the great masters; he could play them, but not fully understand them. As Szigeti put it, Busoni—particularly through their careful study of Bach's Chaconne—"shook me once and for all out of my adolescent complacency".

=== Illness and new beginnings ===
In 1913, Szigeti was diagnosed with tuberculosis and was sent to a sanatorium in Davos, Switzerland to recover, interrupting his concert career. During his stay at the sanatorium, he became re-acquainted with the composer Béla Bartók, who was recovering from pneumonia. His doctor recommended to practice the violin 25 to 30 minutes a day. The two had known each other only in passing during their conservatory days, but now they began a friendship that would last until Bartók's death in 1945. Szigeti was allowed to visit Bartok for the last time in 1943 at Mount Sinai Hospital (Manhattan), New York with his illness worsening, reading Turkish poems while they spread out on his hospital bed.

In 1917, having by then made a full recovery, at age 25 Szigeti was appointed Professor of Violin at the Geneva Conservatory of Music. Szigeti said that this job, although generally satisfying, was often frustrating due to the mediocre quality of many of his students. The years teaching in Geneva provided an opportunity for Szigeti to deepen his understanding of music as an art, along with other aspects such as chamber music, orchestral performance, music theory and composition. Also during that time, Szigeti met and fell in love with Wanda Ostrowska, a young woman of Russian parentage who had been stranded in Geneva by the Russian Revolution of 1917. They married in 1919.

=== American debut ===
Johannes Brahms: Violin Concerto in D major—Allegro giocoso ma non troppo
With Hamilton Harty conducting the Halle Orchestra. Recorded 1928.

In 1925, Szigeti met Leopold Stokowski and played the Bach Chaconne in D minor for him. Less than two weeks later, Szigeti received a telegram from Stokowski's manager in Philadelphia inviting him to perform with the Philadelphia Orchestra later that year: it was his American debut. Szigeti had never played with an American orchestra before, nor heard one, and later he wrote of suffering stage fright. He was taken aback by the American concert scene, and the way that its publicity and popularity driven agents and managers determined much of what was heard in American concert halls. He believed they were not interested in works by the great masters, but preferred the popular light salon pieces he had left behind in his prodigy days. (To the end of his life, Szigeti loved to quote one memorable, cigar-chewing impresario who told him, with regard to Beethoven's Kreutzer Sonata, "Well, let me tell you, Mister Dzigedy—and I know what I’m talking about—your Krewtzer Sonata bores the pants off my audiences!")

=== International repute ===
By 1930, Szigeti was established as a major international concert violinist. He performed extensively in Europe, the United States and Asia, and made the acquaintance of many of the era's leading instrumentalists, conductors and composers.

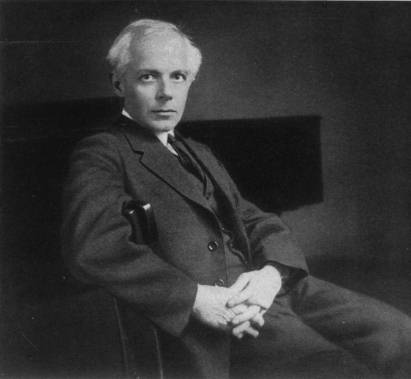
Béla Bartók, Szigeti's longtime friend and colleague

In 1939, to escape the war and Nazi persecution of the Jews, Szigeti emigrated with his wife to the United States, where they settled in California. (A year later, Bartók also fled to America, and just two days after his arrival, he and Szigeti played a sonata recital at the Library of Congress in Washington, D.C.)

During the 1930s, 1940s and into the 1950s, Szigeti recorded extensively, leaving a significant legacy. Notable recordings include the above-mentioned Library of Congress sonata recital; the studio recording of Bartók's Contrasts with Benny Goodman on clarinet and the composer at the piano; the violin concertos of Beethoven, Brahms, Mendelssohn, Prokofiev (No. 1) and Bloch under the batons of such conductors as Bruno Walter, Hamilton Harty and Sir Thomas Beecham; and various works by J.S. Bach, Busoni, Corelli, Handel and Mozart. One of his last recordings was of the Six Sonatas and Partitas for solo violin by Bach; although his technique had deteriorated noticeably by that time, the recording is prized for Szigeti's insight and depth of interpretation.

In 1944, Szigeti joined Jack Benny in a comic performance of Frantisek Drdla's Souvenir in the film Hollywood Canteen.

=== Later years ===
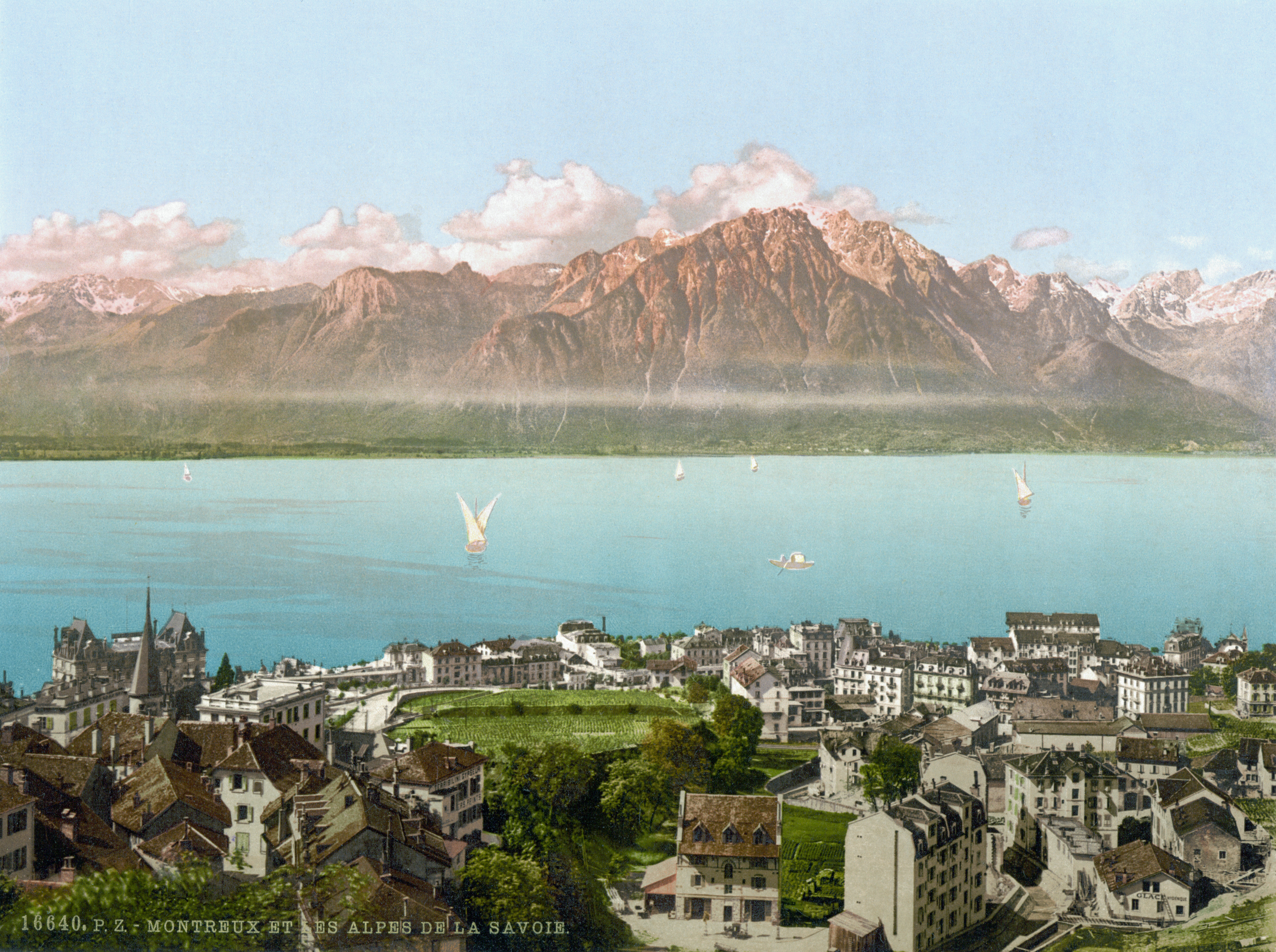
Montreux, Switzerland, where Szigeti spent his later years

External audio
- You may listen to Joseph Szigeti performing Ludwig van Beethoven's Violin Concerto in D major, Op. 61 with Bruno Walter conducting the New York Philharmonic in 1947 here on archive.org

During the 1950s, Szigeti began to develop arthritis in his hands and his playing deteriorated. Despite his weakened technical mastery, his intellect and musical expression were still strong, and he continued to draw large audiences to his concerts. In Naples, Italy, in November 1956, just after the Soviets crushed the Hungarian uprising, as soon as he walked onto the stage the audience burst into wild applause and shouts of Viva l’Ungheria! (Italian for "Long live Hungary!"), delaying the concert for nearly fifteen minutes.

In 1960 Szigeti officially retired from performing, and returned to Switzerland with his wife. There he devoted himself primarily to teaching, although he still traveled regularly to judge international violin competitions. Top-class students from all over Europe and the United States came to study under him. One of these students was Arnold Steinhardt, who spent the summer of 1962 with Szigeti. He came to the conclusion that "Joseph Szigeti was a template for the musician I would like to become: inquisitive, innovative, sensitive, feeling, informed".

Toward the end of his life, Szigeti suffered from frail health. He was put on strict diets and had several stays in hospital, but his friends asserted that this did nothing to dampen his characteristic cheerfulness. He died in Lucerne, Switzerland on February 19, 1973, at the age of 80. The New York Times ran a front-page obituary that ended with this 1966 quote from violinist Yehudi Menuhin:

We must be humbly grateful that the breed of cultured and chivalrous violin virtuosos, aristocrats as human beings and as musicians, has survived into our hostile age in the person of Joseph Szigeti.

== Personal life ==
In 1918, while teaching in Geneva, Szigeti met and fell in love with Wanda Ostrowska. She was born in Russia and had been stranded by the Russian Revolution of 1917 with her sister at a finishing school in Geneva. In 1919, Szigeti and Ostrowska decided to get married, but due to the turbulent political situation in Europe, many unexpected bureaucratic obstacles were thrown up in their path. The first problem was the impossibility of contacting Ostrowska's family, and the couple were forced to go ahead without parental consent, with the permission only of Ostrowska's sister and the headmistress of the finishing school. Further bureaucratic entanglements threatened the young couple's hopes, but eventually the officials responsible granted them a dispensation to marry. Szigeti recalls in his memoirs the words of Consul General Baron de Montlong at the critical moment:

Let us not, if we can avoid it, fall victim to the dead letter of the law. I don't want to postpone the happiness of these two youngsters if we can help it. All laws have been twisted and tortured out of semblance of law, what with war and revolutions. For once let's twist and turn one for a good cause, yes?

Just before the birth of their only child, daughter Irene (1920-2005), Szigeti found himself stuck in Berlin during the Kapp Putsch of 1920, unable to return to Geneva. The entire city had been paralyzed by a general strike, and the trains were not running. His scheduled concert could not go on as planned, but he was forced to stay in Berlin for "interminable days" while the Putsch ran its course. Szigeti writes: "... the impossibility of communicating by phone or wire with my wife--whose condition I pictured with the somewhat lurid pessimism usual to young prospective fathers--was certainly a greater torment to me than all the other discomforts put together".

By 1940, the outbreak of World War II forced the Szigetis to leave Europe for the United States, while Irene remained in Switzerland, having married pianist Nikita Magaloff (1912-1992) earlier that year. They settled in California, where Wanda, always fond of nature, was delighted to be able to raise her own garden. In a letter to a friend, Szigeti describes their California life:

Wanda is happy, doing wonders with her gardening, chicken and rabbit raising, preserve and pâté de foie making. She doesn't budge from our place, doesn't want to come back to New York even for a visit, which I, for one, can well understand! Two dogs, an aviary full of exotic birds, tomatoes, grapes, strawberries, asparagus, artichokes, lovely flowers (camellias too!), right in our own little world.

Szigeti narrowly escaped being killed in the plane crash that claimed the life of movie star Carole Lombard in January 1942. Szigeti, who was on his way to Los Angeles for a concert, was forced to give up his seat on TWA Flight 3 at a refueling stop in Albuquerque, New Mexico, to allow the plane to take on 15 soldiers who, it being wartime, had priority. The plane, off course at night and with wartime blackout conditions in effect, crashed into a mountain cliff after takeoff from an intermediate stop in Las Vegas, killing everyone on board.

In 1950, Szigeti was detained at Ellis Island upon returning from a European concert tour and was held for five days under the Internal Security Act. He was released after an Immigration and Naturalization Service inquiry cleared him of unrevealed charges. At the time of his release from Ellis Island, the New York Times reported that Szigeti had been a "sponsor or patron" of committees or organizations viewed as "subversive" by the U.S. government. Szigeti said after his release that he had never belonged to any political organization in his life, but that gave money or loaned his name to "this cause or that" during the war. The following year, he became a naturalized American citizen.

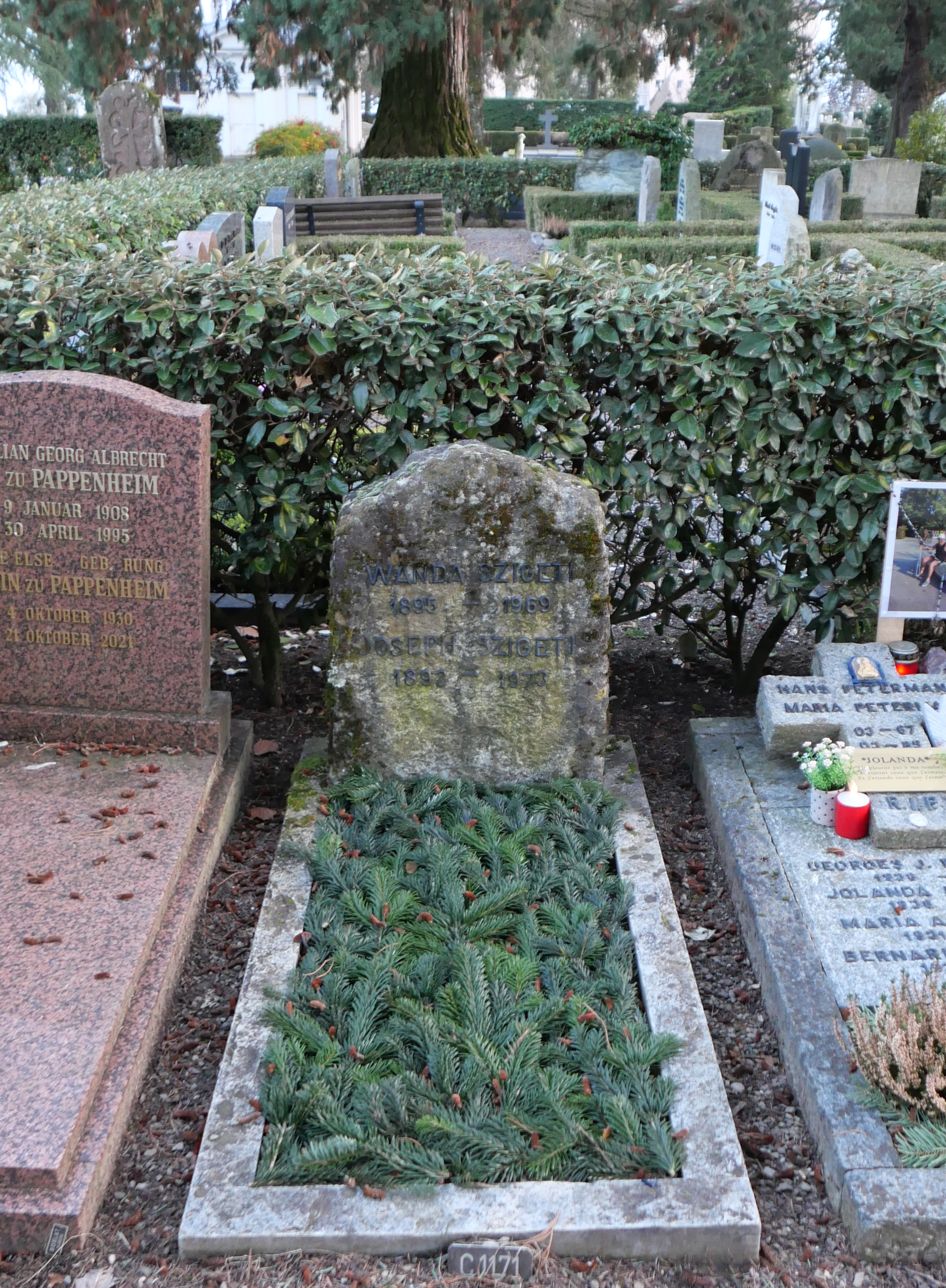
The grave in 2024.

In 1960, the couple returned to Europe and settled near Lake Geneva in Switzerland, close to the home of their daughter and son-in-law. They remained there for the rest of their lives. Wanda died in 1971, predeceasing her husband by two years.

Szigeti found his final resting place at the cemetery of Clarens next to his wife. Their daughter Irene and son-in-law Nikita Magaloff are buried just a few meters from their grave.

== Reception ==
=== Critics ===
Writing in the New Grove Dictionary of Music and Musicians, Boris Schwarz commented:

Szigeti's performing technique was not always flawless and his tone lacked sensuous beauty, although it acquired a spiritual quality in moments of inspiration ... Szigeti held the bow in an old-fashioned way, with the elbow close to the body, and produced much emphatic power, but not without extraneous sounds. Minor reservations, however, were swept aside by the force of his musical personality.

This comment illustrates well the general nature of Szigeti's reception by both critics and fellow musicians: while his musical insights, intellect, and depth of interpretation were almost universally lauded, the purely technical aspect of his playing was awarded a more mixed reaction. His tone in particular seems to have been occasionally uneven from performance to performance. A 1926 recital review in The New York Times, for example, laments that

... his performance was stiff and dry in its observance of letter and its absence of spirit ... Mr. Szigeti was not only inclined to dryness of tone and angularity of phrase, but there were also passages of poor intonation.

In contrast, a review from the previous year in the same journal remarked after a performance of the Beethoven concerto that

Mr. Szigeti has a rather small but beautiful tone, elegance, finish. He played with a quiet sincerity which grew upon the audience, though not with the virility and sweep that other violinists find ... it is clear that Mr. Szigeti is a player to command esteem and respect for his musicianship, for the genuineness of his interpretations, and his artistic style.

=== Musicians ===
Among his fellow musicians, Szigeti was widely admired and respected. Violinist Nathan Milstein wrote that

Szigeti... was an incredibly cultured musician. Actually his talent grew out of his culture ... I always admired him, and he was respected by musicians ... in his late years, he finally got the appreciation he deserved from the general public as well.

In his memoirs, published in 2004, cellist János Starker asserts that

Szigeti was one of the giants among the violinists I had heard from childhood on, and my admiration for him is undiminished up to this day.

Starker then describes a recital he attended late in Szigeti's career, illustrating both the extent to which Szigeti was suffering from arthritis and his ability to still communicate his musical ideas effectively:

"He invited me to his recital in Town Hall ... the first few minutes were excruciating: as I saw later, his fingers had deteriorated to the point that he had almost no flesh on them. But once he loosened up a bit he produced heart-rending beauty.

Violinist Yehudi Menuhin comments at length about Szigeti in his own memoirs, remarking as many others did on Szigeti's intellectual approach to music, but in a somewhat more critical fashion:

Apart from Enesco, he was the most cultivated violinist I have ever known but while Enesco was a force of nature, Szigeti, slender, small, anxious, was a beautifully fashioned piece of porcelain, a priceless Sèvres vase. Curiously for a Hungarian, from whom one expects wild, energetic, spontaneous qualities, Szigeti travelled even farther up a one-way road of deliberate intellectualism. A young accompanist who worked with Szigeti told me that two hours concentration wouldn't get them beyond the first three bars of a sonata--so much analysis and ratiocination went into his practice ... A similar persnicketiness marked his adjudication. Shortly before he died in 1973, he was a member of our jury at the City of London Carl Flesch Concours ... I was struck not only by the sharpness of his intellect but also by what seemed to me the perversity of his opinions. Some particular aspect of a competitor's playing would hold his attention, and he would take violent issue with it, to the exclusion of everything else. For him a violinist was made or broken, a prize awarded or withheld, on details that to me scarcely mattered.

Nevertheless, Menuhin too referred to Szigeti as "a violinist whom I much admired and a man of whom I was very fond".

== Legacy ==
=== The writer ===
During his time in America, Szigeti took to writing; his memoirs, With Strings Attached: Reminiscences and Reflections were published in 1947. The New York Times reviewed it favorably: although in their description the book was "constructed along utterly anarchistic lines, with each episode and anecdote left pretty much on its own", they asserted that "It also has the flavor of life in it, and it is marked by an exhilarating revolt against the custom of arranging catastrophes and triumphs under neat chapter headings".

In 1969, he published his treatise on violin playing, Szigeti on the Violin. In it Szigeti presents his opinions about the then-current state of violin playing and the various challenges and issues facing musicians in the modern world, as well as a detailed examination of violin technique as he understood it.

A recurring theme in the first part is the changing nature of violinist's lives during Szigeti's later years. In his youth, concert artists relied primarily on recitals to establish themselves and attract critical attention and acclaim; by the time of Szigeti's writings, the recital had been eclipsed in importance by the competition. Szigeti was dismayed by this trend, especially since he considered the fast-paced and intense preparation necessary for high-level competitions to be "…incompatible with the slow maturing either of the performing artist or of the repertoire." Szigeti believed that such accelerated development of a musician led to performances that "lack(ed) the stamp of authenticity, the mark of a personal view evolved through trial and error." In a similar vein, he was skeptical of the effects produced by the recording industry on the culture of music-making. In Szigeti's opinion, the allure of the recording contract and the instant "success" that it implied led many young artists to record works before they were musically ready, and thus contributed to the problem of artificially fast development and resulting musical immaturity.

Szigeti also offers a lengthy and detailed explanation of his approach to violin technique. He believed that a violinist should be concerned primarily with musical goals, rather than simply choosing either the easiest or most impressively virtuosic way to play a certain passage. He was particularly concerned with tone color: he advised that "The player should cultivate a seismograph-like sensitivity to brusque changes of tone colour caused by fingerings based on expediency and comfort rather than the composer’s manifest or probable intentions." Other topics prominently discussed include the most effective position of a violinist's left hand, the violin works of Béla Bartók, a cautionary list of widely accepted misprints and editorial inaccuracies in the standard repertoire, and most notably, the vital importance of J.S. Bach's Six Sonatas and Partitas for any violinist's technical and artistic development.

=== New music ===
"Csillagok, csillagok, szépen ragyogjatok"
Excerpt from Szigeti's arrangement of Béla Bartók's Hungarian Folk Songs. With Béla Bartók, piano. Recorded 1930.

Szigeti was an avid champion of new music, and frequently planned his recitals to include new or little-known works alongside the classics. Many composers wrote new works for him, notably Béla Bartók, Ernest Bloch, and Eugène Ysaÿe, along with lesser-known composers such as David Diamond and Hamilton Harty.

The reason for Szigeti's appeal to composers was articulated by Bloch upon completion of his Violin Concerto: the concerto's premiere would have to be delayed a full year for Szigeti to be the soloist, and Bloch agreed, saying that

Modern composers realize that when Szigeti plays their music, their inmost fancy, their slightest intentions become fully realized, and their music is not exploited for the glorification of the artist and his technique, but that artist and technique become the humble servant of the music.

Szigeti was also the dedicatee of the first of Eugène Ysaÿe's Six Sonatas for Solo Violin; in fact, Ysaÿe's inspiration to compose the sonatas came from hearing Szigeti's performances of J.S. Bach's Six Sonatas and Partitas, to which they are intended as a modern counterpart.

Perhaps Szigeti's most fruitful musical partnership was with his friend Béla Bartók. The first piece Bartók dedicated to him was the First Rhapsody for violin and orchestra (or piano) of 1928; the rhapsody, based on both Romanian and Hungarian folk tunes, was one of a pair of violin rhapsodies written in 1928 (the other being dedicated to Zoltán Székely.) In 1938, Szigeti and clarinetist Benny Goodman teamed up to commission a trio from Bartók: originally intended to be a short work just long enough to fill both sides of a 78 rpm record, the piece soon expanded beyond its modest intent and became the three-movement Contrasts for piano, violin and clarinet. In 1944, by which time Szigeti and Bartók had both fled to the United States to escape the war in Europe, Bartók's health was failing and he had sunk into depression. He was in dire need of money, but felt no inspiration to compose and was convinced that his works would never sell to an American audience. Szigeti came to his friend's aid by securing donations from the American Society of Composers and Publishers to pay for Bartók's medical treatment, and then, together with conductor and compatriot Fritz Reiner, persuaded Serge Koussevitzky to commission from Bartók what eventually became his much-beloved Concerto for Orchestra. The work's success brought Bartók some measure of financial security and provided him with a much-needed emotional boost.

As well as performing new works dedicated to him, Szigeti also championed the music of other contemporary composers, notably Sergei Prokofiev and Igor Stravinsky. He was among the first violinists to make Prokofiev's First Violin Concerto a standard part of his repertoire, and frequently performed and recorded works of Stravinsky (including the Duo Concertante, recorded with the composer at the piano in 1945.) The Berg Violin Concerto he even recorded twice, under the baton of Dimitri Mitropoulos. Most famously, Szigeti recorded the Bloch concerto, a premier recording made in 1939 with the Orchestre de la Société des Concerts du Conservatoire conducted by Charles Munch (originally released on Columbia LP and reissued on Membran CD).
