= Váša Příhoda =

Czech violinist

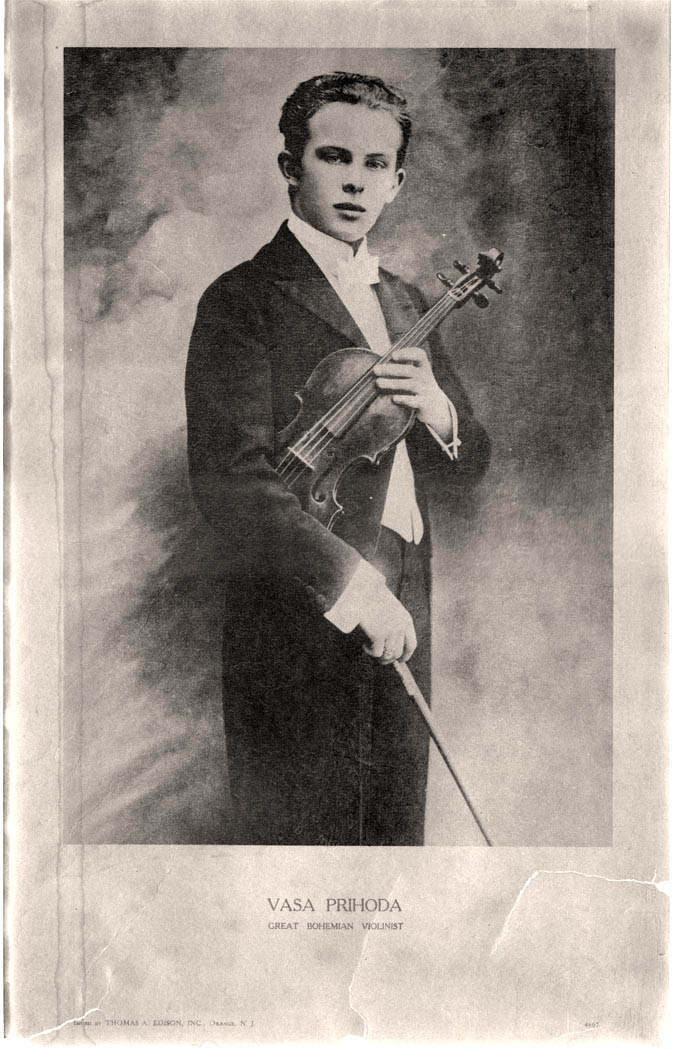
Vasa Prihoda with violin, circa 1921

Váša Příhoda (22 August 1900 – 26 July 1960) was a Czech violinist and minor composer. Considered a Paganini specialist, his recording of the Violin Concerto in A minor by Dvořák is still praised.

== Career ==
Váša Příhoda was born in Vodňany in 1900. His father, Alois Příhoda, was his first teacher and remained so for ten years. Váša studied privately with Jan Mařák (a student of Otakar Ševčík), making his first public concert at age 13, playing the 4th Violin Concerto by Mozart. At age 19 a tour of Italy proved unsuccessful; poverty-stricken, he joined the orchestra of the Café Grand'Italia in Milan to earn money.

There, he was heard by chance by Arturo Toscanini, who arranged a benefit concert for him. He resumed his Italian tour, this time to great success. He was said to have been given Niccolò Paganini's own violin on which to play. He toured Argentina, Brazil and the United States in 1920, and the USA again in 1921. He once shared the stage of the Royal Albert Hall with Pablo Casals, but the pairing was considered unfortunate.

Příhoda gave concerts extensively all over the world and made a number of recordings when the industry was in its infancy. Unfortunately, some of his recordings were not well-produced so the sound quality is poor. He played in the U.S. many times.

He married violinist Alma Rosé in 1930, but they divorced in March 1935 in Czechoslovakia. His second wife was also Jewish. He appeared in two films in 1936: A Woman Between Two Worlds and The Love of the Maharaja. During World War II he taught at the Mozarteum in Salzburg. As he had continued to perform in Germany and German-occupied territories after the Nazi invasion of Czechoslovakia, he was briefly charged with collaboration after the war, and censured by the Czech government.

He later taught at the Academy of Music and Dramatic Arts in Vienna, where his students included Friedrich Cerha. His students also included the cellist Jascha Silberstein. Vienna was his base of operations for many years though he taught in Prague, Munich, and Salzburg as well.

After 1950, he dedicated most of his time to teaching and he also composed small chamber works, which are no longer played. In 1946 he left Czechoslovakia with his family. He moved in 1946 to Rapallo in Italy and then, in 1948, to Turkey, taking Turkish nationality.

He returned to Czechoslovakia in 1956. This comeback was received most enthusiastically in Prague. He played recitals with pianist Alfred Holeček in the Rudolfinum Music Hall, and performed Dvořák's Violin Concerto in Smetana Hall of the Municipal House during the Prague Spring Festival.

Příhoda composed his own cadenzas to all the concertos he played. Those for the Beethoven Violin Concerto in D major have been recorded by Josef Suk. He gave his last concerts in April 1960 and died of heart disease on 26 July 1960, aged 59.

He also wrote a number of minor pieces, such as Slawische Melodie, Caprice and Sérénade, some of which he recorded.All: 16 pieces and one violonkoncert in c mol, opus 16.

== Recordings ==
- Bach: Double Violin Concerto (with Franco Novello)
- Bach-Gounod: Ave Maria (with the soprano Selma Kurz (one of his recordings pits his recording of the Bach-Gounod Ave Maria with those of Jan Kubelík and Jaroslav Celeda)
- Bazzini: La ronde des lutins, Op. 25
- Bellini: "Ah, non credea mirarti ... Ah! Non giunge uman pensiero" from La sonnambula (with Selma Kurz)
- Chopin: Berceuse in D-flat major, Op.57 (arr. Příhoda)
- Dvořák: Violin Concerto in A minor
- Dvořák: Slavonic Dance in A-flat major, Op. 72, No. 8
- Godard: Berceuse ("Ah! ne t'éveille pas encore") from Jocelyn (with Selma Kurz)
- Godard: En regardant le Ciel
- Gounod: Sérénade (with Selma Kurz)
- Hubay: Zephyr
- Kreisler: Caprice viennois (with Selma Kurz)
- Mozart: Violin Concertos No.3 and No.4
- Paganini: Violin Concerto No.1 in E-flat major (usually transposed to D major)
- Paganini: Introduction and Variations on "Nel cor più non mi sento" from Paisiello's La Molinara (elaborated by Příhoda)
- Paganini: Sonatina No.12 in E minor, Op.3 No.6, M.S.27 (arr. Váša Příhoda)
- Provazník: Valse Joyeuse for violin and piano, Op. 137

The Song of the Indian Guest
1929 recording of transcription for violin and piano from Rimsky-Korsakov's opera Sadko, featuring violinist Váša Příhoda

- Nikolai Rimsky-Korsakov: Chant Hindou from Sadko
- Saint-Lubin: Fantasie on the Sextet from Donizetti's Lucia di Lammermoor
- Sarasate: Zigeunerweisen
- Sarasate: Spanish Dances Op.22, No.1 Romanza Andaluza and No.2 Jota Navarra
- Schubert: Litanei auf das Fest Aller Seelen ("Ruh'n in Frieden alle Seelen"), D. 343
- Smetana: Z domoviny (Aus der Heimat; From My Homeland) for violin and piano
- his own transcription of waltzes from Richard Strauss's Der Rosenkavalier
- Tartini: Sonata for violin and continuo in G minor, Devil's Trill Sonata, realized Vieuxtemps
- Toselli: Serenade (with Selma Kurz)
- Vieuxtemps: Violin Concerto No.4, Op.31
- Viotti: Sinfonia Concertante for 2 violins and strings in F major (with Franco Novello)
- Vitali, trans. Respighi: Chaconne

== Sources ==
- Montreal Gazette, 5 October 1974
- Music Web International
