= Franciszek Kempa =

Polish violin maker (1903–1953)

Franciszek "Franz" Kempa (1903–1953) was a Polish violin maker who is known for crafting what became known as the "violin of hope". He crafted the instrument in 1941 while he was a prisoner in the Dachau concentration camp.

In early 2025, art dealers in Hungary sent the violin out for repair, when a note was found inside the instrument that read, "Trial instrument, made under difficult conditions with no tools and materials. Dachau. Anno 1941, Franciszek Kempa." The note is interpreted to be that of a master violin maker explaining how he was forced to build an instrument that did not meet his own standards. It is believed to be the only surviving musical instrument actually built inside the camp rather than being brought in from outside. The two art dealers later came to call the instrument the "Violin of Hope", expressing that one can overcome the most extreme experiences by focusing not on the ordeal but on the task itself.

According to documents from the Dachau Concentration Camp Memorial Site, Kempa survived the war and returned to Poland to continue making instruments until his death in 1953. The records confirm that the Nazis were aware of his skills as a luthier, and it is thought that his expertise may have saved his life.
