= Alfonso Mosesti =

Italian violinist (1924–2018)

Alfonso Mosesti (18 April 1924 – 6 April 2018) was an Italian violinist. He was concertmaster of the RAI National Symphony Orchestra, and a performer of chamber music.

== Life ==
Mosesti was born in 1924 in Rivignano. He studied with Cesare Barison and Antonio Illersberg, graduating from Trieste Conservatory in 1946. Herbert von Karajan chose him as the concertmaster of the Verdi Orchestra in Trieste; in 1951 he gave with the orchestra the first performance of Illersberg's Violin Concerto.

He studied further with Giuseppe Prencipe and George Enescu at the Accademia Musicale Chigiana in Siena. From 1954 he was concertmaster of the RAI Orchestra in Rome, and later of the RAI Orchestra in Naples; from 1964 he was concertmaster of the RAI Orchestra in Turin.

He often played concertos with the orchestra, and in 1977 he gave the first performance of the recently discovered Concerto in D by Gaetano Pugnani.

He performed chamber music, particularly as a member of the Quartetto di Turino, with viola player Carlo Pozzi, cellist Giuseppe Petrini and pianist Luciano Giarbella; the piano quartet performed internationally and made recordings.

Mosesti died in Turin in 2018, leaving his wife, mezzo-soprano Miti Truccato Pace, and daughter Cecilia, a pianist.
