= August Wilhelmj =

German violinist and teacher

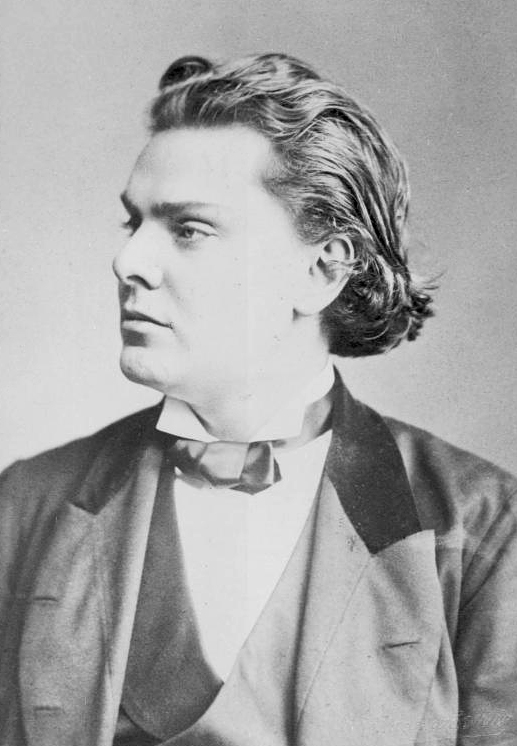
- Born: 21 September 1845; Usingen, Duchy of Nassau, German confederation
- Died: 22 January 1908 (aged 62); London, United Kingdom of Great Britain and Ireland
- Other names: August Emil Daniel Ferdinand Wilhelmj
- Occupation: Violinist

August Emil Daniel Ferdinand Wilhelmj (German pronunciation: [vɪlˈhɛlmi] vil-HEL-mee; 21 September 1845 – 22 January 1908) was a German violinist and teacher.

Wilhelmj was born in Usingen and was considered a child prodigy; when Henriette Sontag heard him in 1852 at seven years old, she said, "You will be the German Paganini". In 1861, Franz Liszt heard him and sent him to Ferdinand David with a letter containing the words "Let me present you the future Paganini!". His teachers included: Ferdinand David, for the violin, Moritz Hauptmann, for music theory and composition, and Joachim Raff for composition.

A personal friend of Wagner, he led the violins at the première of Der Ring des Nibelungen in Bayreuth in 1876. He visited Australia in 1881, playing in the old Freemasons' Hall in Sydney, but though appreciated by those who attended his concerts, their number was not sufficient to make the tour a financial success. It was not until introduced to London audiences by Jenny Lind in 1886 that Wilhelmj became a "household name".

He has become famous for his late nineteenth century arrangement of the second movement of J. S. Bach's Orchestral Suite No. 3 for violin and piano, known as Air on the G String and for his re-orchestration of the 1st movement of Niccolò Paganini's Violin Concerto No.1 in D major Op. 6 (1883/1884).

From 1894 on he was a professor of violin at the Guildhall School of Music and Drama. Among his pupils were Jessie and Harold Grimson, American violinist Nahan Franko, Canadian musician Donald Heins, and the Australian conductor Aylmer Buesst. Wilhelmj owned a Stradivari 1725 violin from 1866 until his retirement, which later came to be known by his name. Another known violin was made by Giovanni Francesco Pressenda 1843 (Ex Wilhelmj) His 1785 Guadagnini was later owned (as "ex-Wilhelmj") by Jack Liebeck. He died in London.

Wilhelmj's sister-in-law was composer and singer Maria Wilhelmj. His son, Adolf Wilhelmj, was also a teacher who was engaged at the Conservatory of Belfast in 1895 and later at the Royal Irish Academy of Music in Dublin where he taught Arthur Warren Darley. Both August and Adolf are buried at the Nordfriedhof, Wiesbaden.

== See also ==
- List of classical violinists
