= Franz von Vecsey =

Hungarian violinist and composer (1893-1935)

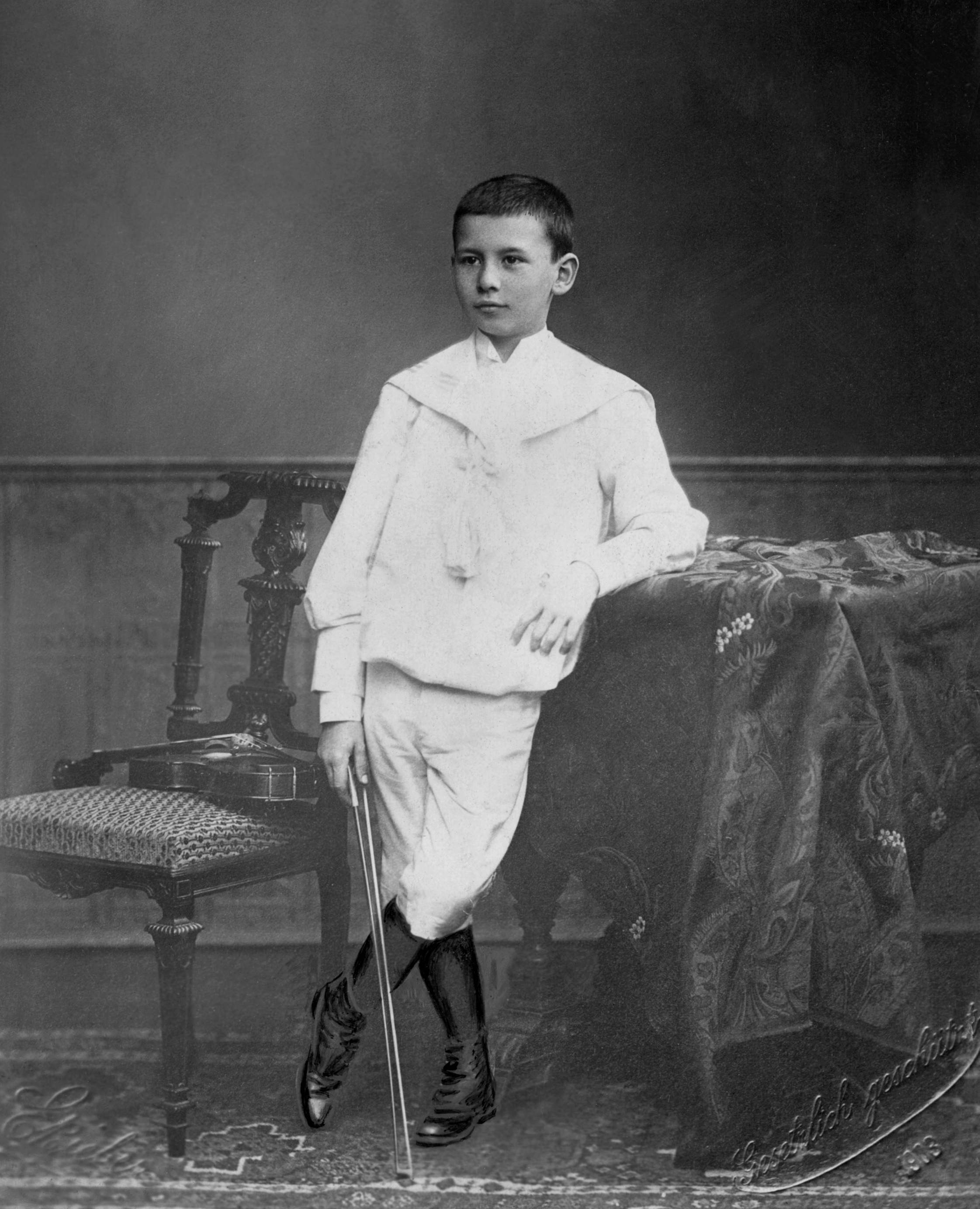
- Franz von Vecsey at the time of his Berlin debut in 1903

Background information
- Also known as: Ferenc de Vecsey
- Born: Ferenc Vecsey; 23 March 1893; Budapest, Austria-Hungary
- Died: 5 April 1935 (aged 42) Rome, Italy
- Genres: Classical
- Occupation: Violinist
- Instrument: Violin
- Years active: 1903–1935

Franz von Vecsey (born Ferenc Vecsey; 23 March 1893 – 5 April 1935) was a Hungarian violinist and composer, who became a well-known virtuoso in Europe through the early 20th century. He made his public debut at the age of 10. An accomplished violinist, he went onto perform concerts in the early twentieth century in the United Kingdom, Europe and both North America and South America.

== Early life and career ==
Joseph Joachim and the young Franz von Vecsey (c.1905)

He was born in Budapest and began his violin studies with his father, Lajos Vecsey. At the age of 8 he entered the studio of Jenő Hubay. Two years later, aged 10, he played for Joseph Joachim in Berlin (making his début at "Beethoven Halle" on 17 May 1903) and subsequently became known as a child prodigy virtuoso.

He became one of the pre-eminent violinists in Europe in the 1910s and 1920s, at one point touring with Béla Bartók as his piano accompanist. Aged only 12, he became the re-dedicatee of Jean Sibelius' Violin Concerto in D minor in 1905, when the original dedicatee, Willy Burmester, refused to play the work after he was unable to appear at the premiere of the revised version, which was premiered by Karel Halíř instead. Vecsey championed the Sibelius concerto, first performing it when he was only 13. He was the dedicatee of Hubay's Violin Concerto No.3. He also spent time composing, and wrote a number of virtuosic salon pieces for the violin.

== Later life and career ==
From 1926 until his death, he lived with his wife in Venice, at the "Palazzo Giustinian de'Vescovi" on Canal Grande. His career steadily faltered after the First World War, as he grew tired of constant touring and wanted to concentrate more on conducting. By the 1930s, he was about to embark on that dream, but it suddenly curtailed in 1935, when he became seriously ill with a pulmonary embolism that grew through much of his life. He sought medical care in Rome, where he received surgery. The operation was unsuccessful, and Vecsey succumbed to the disease at the age of 42.

== Selected compositions ==
Violin solo

- Preludio e Fuga in C minor (1914); dedicated to Jenő Hubay

Violin and piano

- La Campanella (1934); transcription based on the Rondo from Violin Concerto No. 2 by Niccolò Paganini
- Caprice in F♯ major (1913)
- Caprice fantastique (1933)
- Caprice No. 1 "Le Vent" in A minor (1916)
- Caprice No. 2 "Cascade" in F♯ major (1916)
- Caprice No. 3 "Valse macabre"
- Caprice No. 4 "Badinage"
- Caprice No. 5 "La Lune glisse à travers les nuages" (1917)
- Caprice No. 6 "Octaves dansantes"
- Caprice No. 7 "Claire de lune"
- Caprice No. 8 "Feu d'étincelles"
- Caprice No. 9 "Reflets dans l'eau"
- Caprice No. 10 "Pensée fantastique"
- Le Chagrin de Pierrot
- Chanson nostalgique (1933)
- Chanson triste (1913)
- Conte passionné in G major (1913)
- Fantaisies (1921)

No. 1 – Devant un tombeau

- Mariä Wiegenlied (1934); transcription of Max Reger's Op. 76, No. 52
- 3 Morceaux (1912)

No. 1 – Rêve (A minor)
No. 2 – Humoresque (E minor)
No. 3 – Menuetto (E major)

- Motus Barbarus
- Plainte nostalgique
- Preghiera in G♯ minor (1924)
- Préludes (1921); Nos. 3~5 also for 2 violins and piano

No. 1 – À toi
No. 2 – Nuit du Nord
No. 3 – Badinage impertinant
No. 4 – Claire de lune sur le Bosphore
No. 5 – Pourquoi ...
No. 6 – Nostalgie
No. 7 – Rêverie
No. 8 – Pensée triste

- Souvenir (1913)
- Valse lente (1933)
- Valse triste in C minor (1913)
