= Jan Kubelík =

Czech violinist and composer (1880–1940)

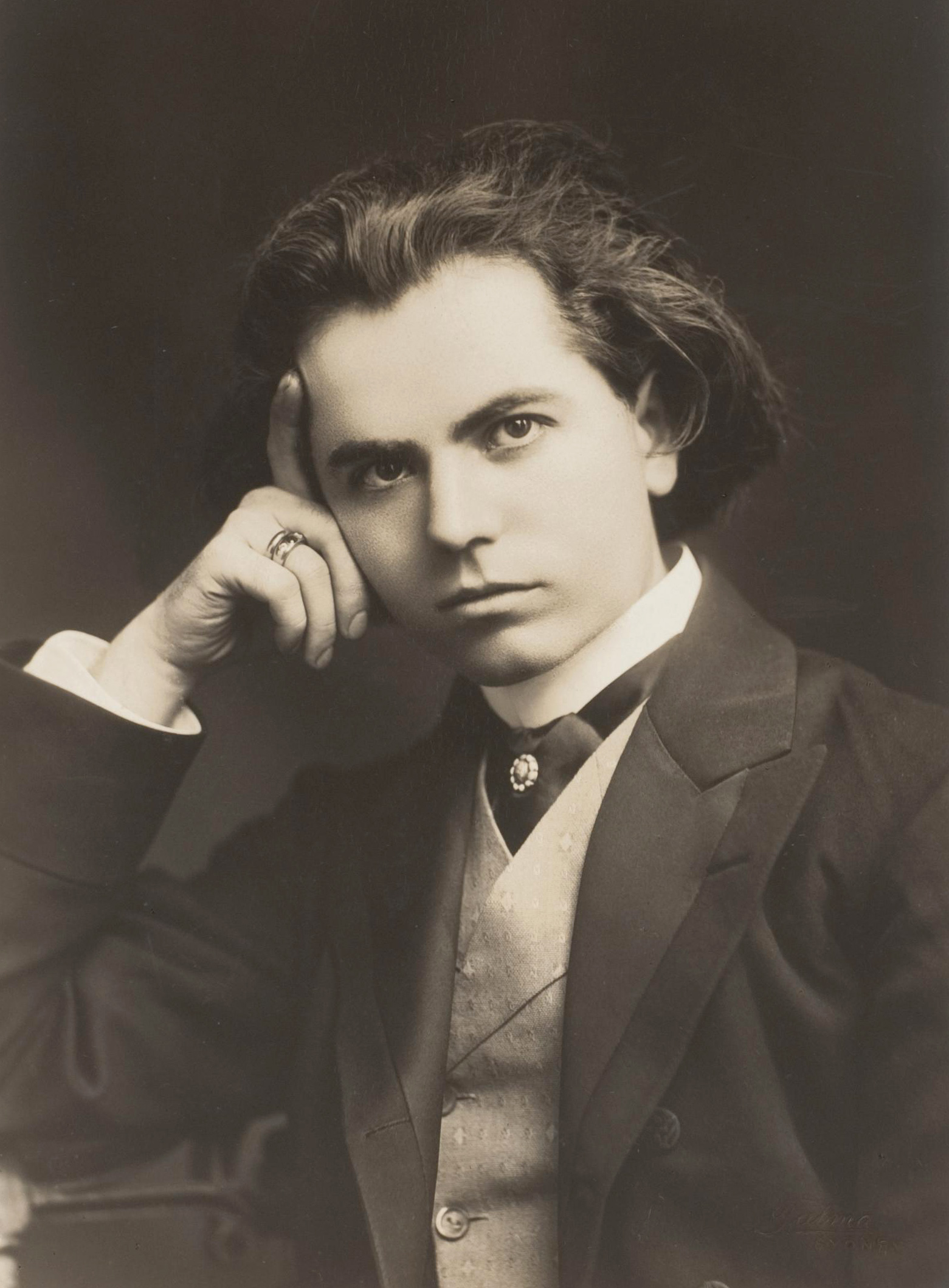
Kubelík in 1908 (Talma & Co., Sydney)

Jan Kubelík (5 July 1880 – 5 December 1940) was a Czech violinist and composer.

== Biography ==
He was born in Michle (now part of Prague). His father, a gardener by occupation, was an amateur violinist. He taught his two sons the violin and after discovering the talent of Jan, who was aged five at the time, arranged for him to study with Karel Weber and Karel Ondříček. Aged eight he studied at the Prague Conservatory with Otakar Ševčík, of whose technique he became the most famous representative. As a child, he used to practice 10 to 12 hours a day, or "until my fingers started to bleed." After 1898, he toured as a soloist, soon becoming renowned for his great virtuosity and flawless intonation, and his very full and noble tone. He played a Guarneri del Gesù and also two Stradivarius violins: he acquired the 1715 Stradivarius Emperor in 1910.

After great success following his debut in Vienna, and in London (where he first appeared at a Hans Richter concert in 1900), Kubelík toured in the United States in 1901 for the first time. He made his first appearance for the Royal Philharmonic Society, London in the season of 1901–1902, and in 1902 was awarded the Society's Gold Medal (in succession to Eugène Ysaÿe). In 1902 he brought the Czech Philharmonic Orchestra to London, having assisted it financially in the previous year.

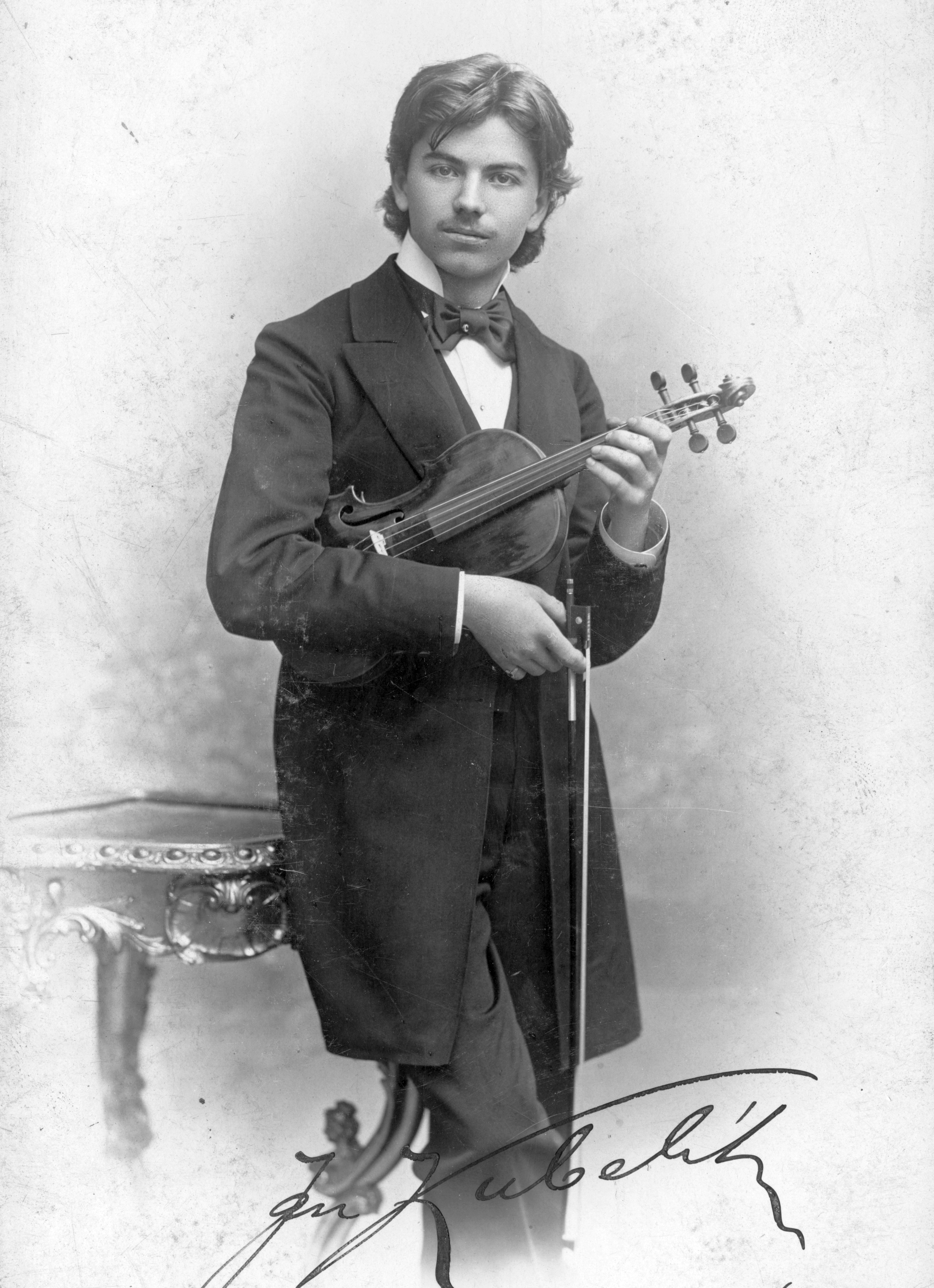

In 1903, he married Countess Anna Julie Marie Széll von Bessenyö (born 1 March 1880 in Budapest), niece of former Prime Minister of Hungary Kálmán Széll, with whom he had eight children, five violinist daughters and three sons, among them conductor Rafael Kubelík.

Kubelík made a number of recordings; his acoustic recordings were made for The Gramophone and Typewriter Company Ltd., the Victor Talking Machine Company, Fonotipia/Odeon and Schallplatte Grammophon/Polydor (who also recorded Váša Příhoda, Franz von Vecsey and Jacques Thibaud). The Gramophone Company recorded him as accompanist to Dame Nellie Melba in 1904, a match which reflected the classical phrasing, tonal purity and security of his art and was an ideal complement to it. Their early version of the Bach-Gounod Ave Maria (G.C. 03033) was recorded twice, in October 1904 and again in February 1905, and this was one of the great early classics of the gramophone, one of those records which 'made' the instrument a popular success, though the double celebrity single-sided title retailed at one guinea. Nine years later (when technology had improved) the partnership was reformed to re-make the record (as 03333), in May 1913 with organ accompaniment and again in October 1913. It was the latter version which then survived in the inter-war catalogue in two-sided form. His 1935 Carnegie Hall concert was also recorded and has been reissued.

He wrote music, including six violin concertos, and continued to perform in public until his death, with a pause between the end of World War I and 1920, during which period he composed. In 1920 he resumed his concert career. In 1917, he was elected as an honorary member of Phi Mu Alpha Sinfonia music fraternity by the fraternity's Alpha chapter at the New England Conservatory in Boston.

Jan Kubelík died in Prague in 1940, aged 60.

== Critical reception and legacy ==
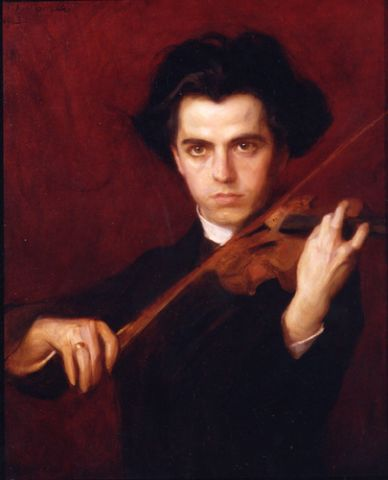
Jan Kubelík, by Philip de László, 1903

In 1907, reviewing a concert by Kubelik at New York's massive Hippodrome Theatre, the New York Times wrote

Mr. Kubelik's artistry is of the most remarkable kind. He is not a deeply moving player; he has not the power of touching profoundly and immediately the hearts of his listeners nor of laying hold of the inner mystery of the greatest music. There is something aloof in him as he plays it; yet few have the power of so ravishing the senses with the sheer beauty of his tone, the charm of his cantilena, the elegance and ease with which he masters all the technical difficulties of what he is playing so that they no longer suggest themselves as difficulties. Octaves, thirds and sixths drop from his instrument in a tone of honeyed sweetness and oily smoothness; not a large tone, but one of indescribable roundness and purity; his runs and passages of all sorts are as pearls from his hands. There is something of feminine grace and charm in Mr. Kubelik's playing, and he seldom compels by its authority or stirs by its passion and virility, but in its way it is wholly delightful.

In 1903 Kubelík's portrait was painted by Philip de László, and a 1912 Cubist painting by Georges Braque incorporates a handbill featuring the words "Mozart Kubelick" (sic). Carl Sandburg mentions Jan Kubelík in his Chicago Poems, 1916. He is adored by the sisters in Sally Benson's collected short stories which later became the film Meet Me in St. Louis (1944). He is also referred to in Robert Ludlum's 2002 novel The Janson Directive.

== Selected works ==
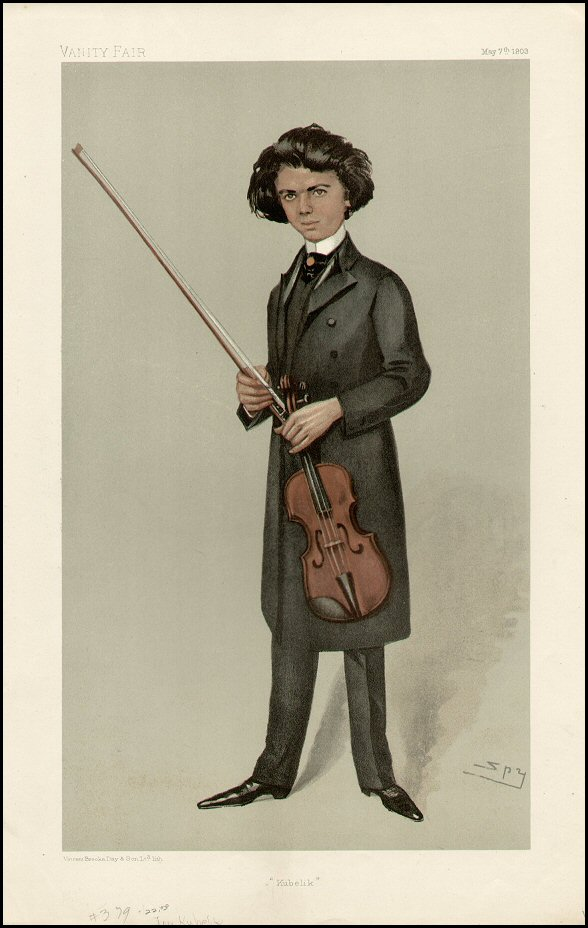
Kubelík caricatured by Spy for Vanity Fair, 1903

=== Violin and orchestra ===
- Concerto No. 1 in C major (published 1920)
- Concerto No. 2 in D major
- Concerto No. 3 in E major
- Concerto No. 4 in B♭ major (published c.1932)
- Concerto No. 5
- Concerto No. 6
- Cadenzas for the Violin Concerto in D major, Op.61 by Ludwig van Beethoven
- Cadenzas for the Violin Concerto in D major, Op.77 by Johannes Brahms
- Cadenzas for the Violin Concerto No. 5 in A major by Wolfgang Amadeus Mozart

=== Violin and piano ===
- Burlesque
- Oriental Scene (published c.1931)
- Menuett (published 1931)

== Discography of Fonotipia titles ==
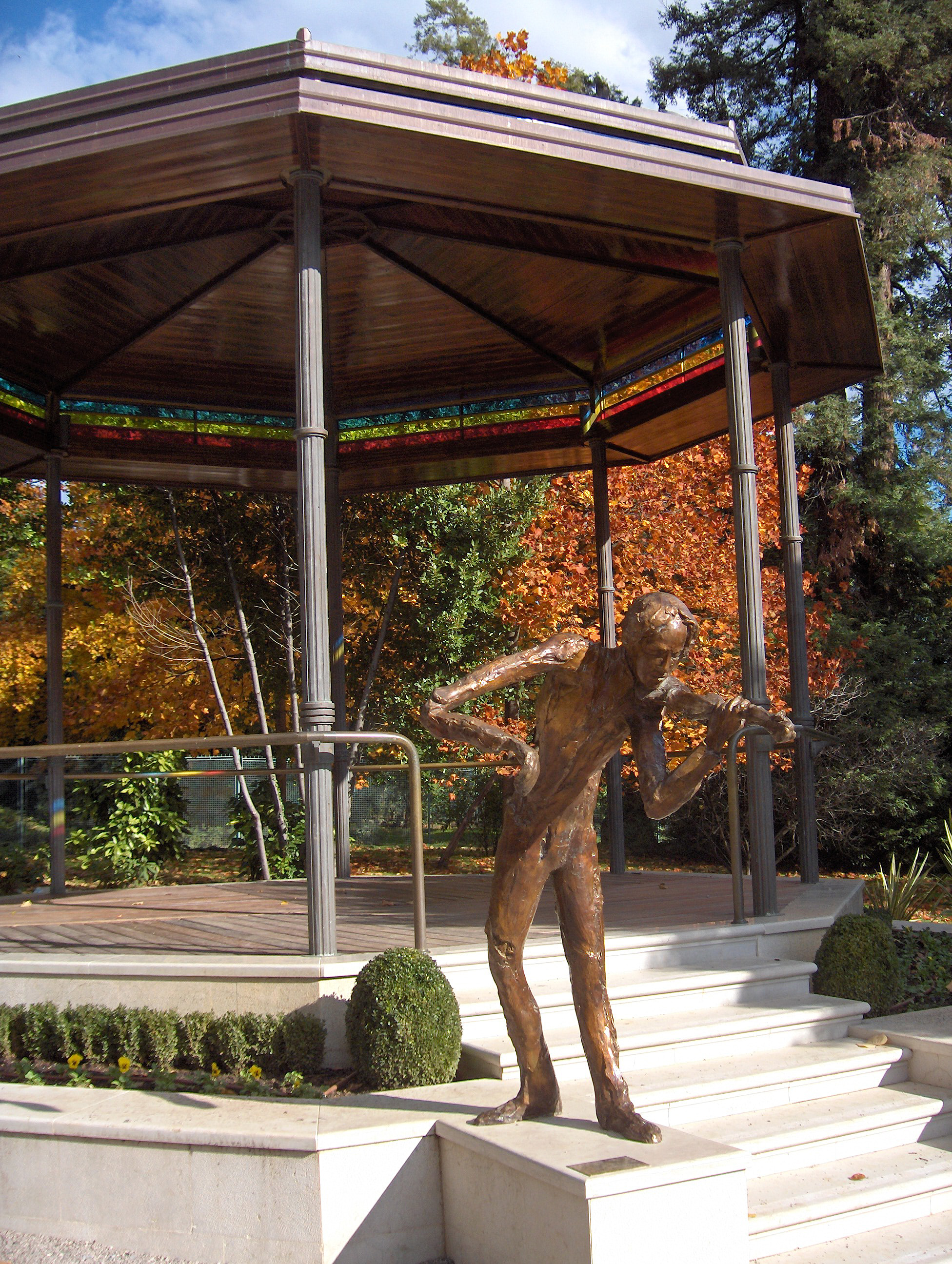
Statue of Jan Kubelík from 2007 by T. Kostanjević in Opatija, Croatia

- 39162 Souvenir (Drdla) XPh 270 (27 cm)
- 39163 Danse Hongroise (Nachez) XPh 272 (27 cm)
- 39164 Variazioni sulla ballata di Mefisto (Gounod) XPh 273^{2} (27 cm)
- 39191 Serenade (d'Ambrosio) (27 cm)
- 39192 Perpetuum mobile (Paganini) XPh 276 (27 cm)
- 39193 Serenade (Drdla) (27 cm)
- 39194 Traumerei (Schumann) XPh 285? (27 cm)
- 39195 La Ronde des Lutins (Bazzini) XPh 295 (27 cm)
- 39884 Scherzo Tarantella (Wieniawski) XPh 2231 (27 cm)
- 39925 Der Zephir (Hubay) XPh 2228 (27 cm)
- 62036 Cavatina (Raff) XPh 2400 (27 cm)
- 62037 Vision (Drdla) (27 cm)
- 62496 Serenata napolitana (Sgambati) (27 cm)
- 62497 Le cygne (Saint-Saëns) (27 cm)
- 62573 Poeme (Fibich) (27 cm)
- 62574 Berceuse (Drdla) (27 cm)
- 62603 Serenade de Pierrot (Randegger) (27 cm)
- 69010 Sextet, Lucia di Lammermoor (Donizetti) (35 cm)
- 69013 Variazioni sull'Inno Nazionale Inglese XXPh 275 (35 cm)
- 74083 Danza Spagnola Zapateado (Sarasate) 5526F (30 cm)
- 74084 Zingaresca (Sarasate) 5526F (30 cm)
- 75085 Capriccio in Sol minore (Paganini) 5527F (30 cm)
- 75086 Cadenza del Concerto Paganini in Re Maggiore (Kubelik) 5527F (30 cm)

Source: J.R. Bennett, Dischi Fonotipia Numerical Catalogue - A Golden Treasury (J. Dennis/Record Collector Shop, Ipswich 1953).
