= Philippe Borer =

Swiss violinist (1955–2023)

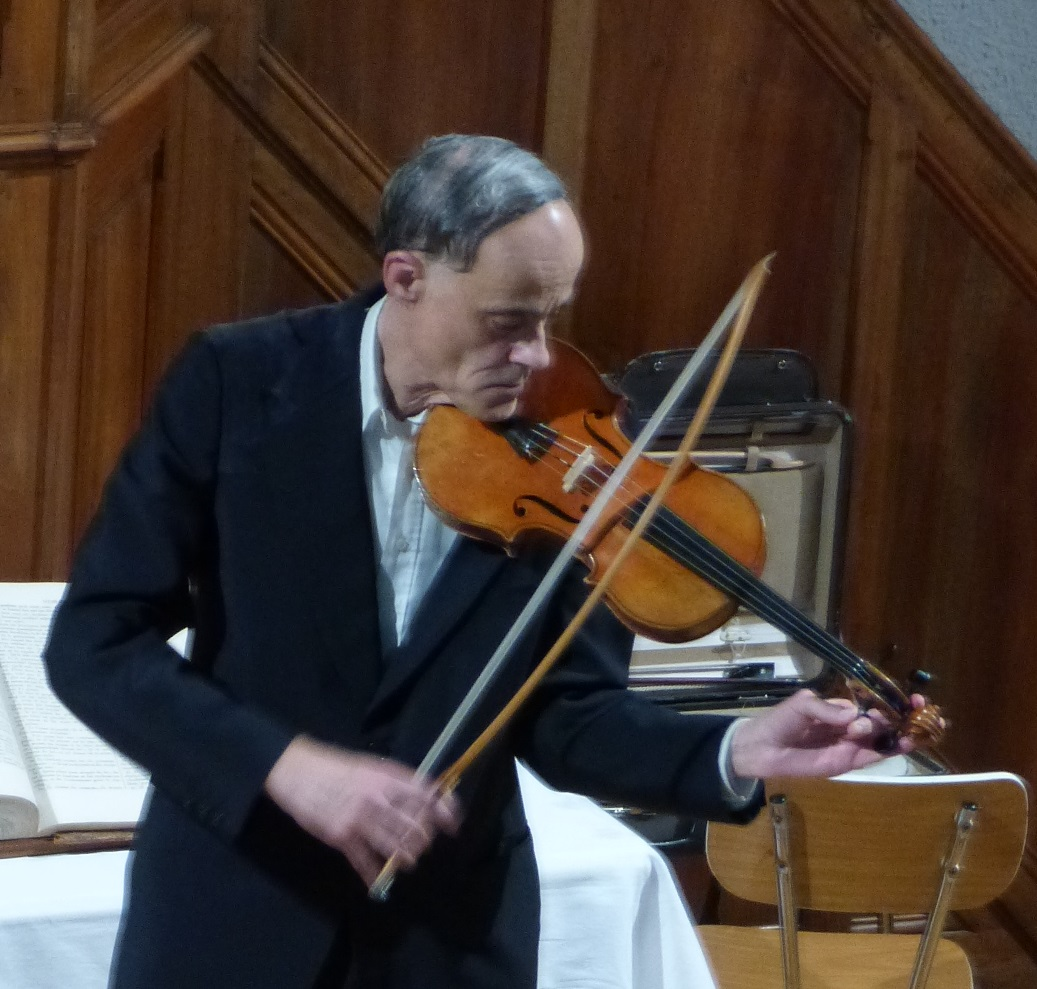
Borer performing

Philippe Borer (1955 – 13 June 2023) was a Swiss violinist, scholar and teacher.

== Biography ==
Philippe Borer studied the violin and the viola under Max Rostal, Ruggiero Ricci and Jan Sedivka and held various positions as member of orchestras and chamber ensembles in Switzerland, Italy and Australia. In addition he has carried out research in the areas of violin pedagogy, violin history and philosophy of music, receiving his PhD in 1995. From 1998 he has performed with a curved bow, his polyphonic repertoire comprising works by Marini, Westhoff, Bach, Paganini and Bach Bachtischa. His first performance of the Bach Chaconne with the curved bow took place in December 2000 in Saint Petersburg as part of the final concert of the 4th international conference “Blagodatovskiye chteniya”. Since 2007 he has been giving masterclasses at the Novgorod State University, the Mozarteum Salzburg and the University of Alberta. In 2016 he formed a violin and piano duo with French master musician Jean-Claude Frey (the son of Georges Frey).

Borer has recorded contemporary music for violin and viola, premiering works by Don Kay and he is the dedicatee of several compositions for violin and viola by Michael Bach Bachtischa. His former students include Christophe Horak of the Scharoun Ensemble, Dr Angela Lohri, the author of Kombinationstöne und Tartinis «terzo suono» and Beth Hebert, West Australian Symphony Orchestra’s first violinist.

== Writings ==
- Aspects of European Influences on Violin Playing & Teaching in Australia, MMus diss., 1988
- Les 24 caprices de Paganini et la constellation romantique, in «Revue Musicale de Suisse Romande», n. 2, June 1993, pp. 75–85
- Feuillet d’Album, in «Revue musicale de Suisse romande», n. 2, June 1993, pp. 101–106
- The Twenty-Four Caprices of Niccolò Paganini, PhD diss., 1995
- Paganini and the philosophy of the violin, in «Quaderni dell’Istituto di Studi Paganiniani» Nº 8, October 1996
- The Twenty-Four Caprices of Niccolò Paganini, their significance for the history of violin playing and the music of the Romantic era, Zurich, 1997
- Scuola, tradizione e modernità in Paganini, in «Nuova Rivista Musicale Italiana», 1/1999
- La Pura Forma (in coll. with Paolo Cecchinelli), in «Quaderni dell’Istituto di Studi Paganiniani» n. 13, 2001
- Паганини и философия скрипки, in Вопросы инструментов ведения, сборник рефератов четвертой Международной инструментоведческой конференции сериала «Благодатовские Чтения», Russian Institute of History of Arts, Saint Petersburg, 2000
- La Pagina e l'Archetto, bibliografia violinistica storico-tecnica e studi effettuati su Niccolò Paganini, Genoa, 2003
- Some reflections on Paganini's violin strings, in Proceedings of the international conference Restoration and Conservation of the Guarneri del Gesù known as Cannone, Genoa, 2004
- Allusive masterpiece (in coll. with Tatiana Berford), in «The Strad», October 2004
- Об аутентичных струнах Н. Паганини и не только (tr. T. Berford), in «Старинная музыка», n. 1-2 (31-32), pp. 21–25, Moscow, 2006
- Cromatismo ed espressione delle passioni in Paganini, in Proceedings of the international conference Paganini Divo e Comunicatore, Genoa, 2007
- The chromatic scale in the compositions of Viotti and Paganini, a turning point in violin playing and writing for strings, in: Nicolò Paganini Diabolus in Musica, ed. by A. Barizza and F. Morabito, Turnhout, Brepols, 2010, pp. 91–120
- Paganini's virtuosity and improvisatory style, in Beyond Notes, Improvisation in Western Music in the Eighteenth and Nineteenth Century, ed. by R. Rasch, Turnhout, 2011
- Grand détaché porté contro détaché traîné, un punto fondamentale della lezione viottiana, in Giovanni Battista Viotti «professione musicista», sguardo sull’opera, lo stile, le fonti, edited by M. Dellaborra, Rome, Società Editrice di Musicologia, 2017
- The Sweet Power of Strings, reflections on the musical idea of dolce, in Exploring Virtuosities, ed. by Christine Hoppe, Göttingen Studies in Musicology, 2018

== Dedicated compositions ==
- Don Kay, Cloud patterns for solo viola (1988), published by the Australian Music Centre
- Jean-Frédéric Perrenoud, Concerto pour violon, Op. 56. Dedication note: "À mon très cher Philippe qui le premier a senti ce que ces pages contiennent"
- Michael Bach Bachtischa, 52 Sounds for Violin (1995/98) and "Paganini non ripete" (2000) for viola
- Michael Bach Bachtischa, 3 Pitches, 11 Sounds for Violin (2000). Dedication note: "For Lorin Maazel (70th Birthday) and for Philippe Borer"
- John Michet, Ambiguïté for viola and piano (2019). Dedication note: “À Philippe Borer”

== Instruments and bows ==
Philippe Borer (violin) plays Ernst's “Der Erlkönig”

Philippe Borer played on a copy of Paganini's ‘Il Cannone Guarnerius’ crafted by Alberto Giordano, a 2003 Pietro Capodieci violin and a 1948 viola by Jean Werro. He used a classical bow made by Luc Breton and two curved bows built at the Atelier BACH.Bogen in Stuttgart.

== Sources ==
- Walter Amadeus Ammann, Paganini im Scheinwerferlicht, in the Schweizer Musikzeitung, No. 2, February 2011
- J.-Ph. B., Bach en guise d’adieu, in «L’Express Feuille d’Avis de Neuchâtel», 16 May 1989
- Tatiana Berford, Размышления у поворотного пункта, in «Старинная музыка», n. 4 (18), Moscow, 2002
- Roger Boss, Éditorial, in «Revue Musicale de Suisse Romande», n. 2, Juin 1993
- Javier Carrau Mellado, Aspectos pedagógicos e interpretativos del repertorio para violín solo hasta Paganini, PhD diss., Jaume I University, Castelló de la Plana, 2014
- Paolo Cecchinelli, P. Borer, The Twenty-four caprices of Niccolo Paganini, in «ESTA Quaderni», November 2000
- Stefan Drees (editor), Lexikon der Violine, Laaber, Laaber-Verlag, 2004
- Stefan Drees, “Exploring Virtuosities”, in «Die Tonkunst», April 2019, Nr. 2, Jg. 13, pp. 247–249
- Mark Katz, The violin: a research and information guide, Routledge, New York, 2006
- Angela Lohri, Kombinationstöne und Tartinis «terzo suono», Mainz, 2016
- L. de Mv., La Passion selon Saint-Matthieu, in «L’Express Feuille d’Avis de Neuchâtel», 24 February 1976
- Elinor Morrisby, Up is down, a life of violinist Jan Sedivka, Melbourne, 2008
- Edward Neill, Recensioni, in «Quaderni dell’Istituto di Studi Paganiniani», n. 10, 1998
- Heiner Reitz, Letter to Ph. Borer, 8 February 2006 (archives of Ph. Borer)
- Ruggiero Ricci, Correspondence with Ph. Borer 2002-2004 (archives of Ph. Borer)
- Max Rostal, Letter to Ph. Borer, 13 August 1987 (archives of Ph. Borer)
- Henry Roth, Philippe Borer’s The 24 Caprices of Nicolò Paganini, their significance for the history of violin playing and the music of the Romantic era (review), in «The Strad», December 1998
- Michael Smith, Viola’s debut sweet music for craftsman, in «The Mercury», 9 July 1991
- R.T., Un concert inhabituel, in «Journal de Morges», 1 July 1988
- Nathaniel Vallois, Nicolò Paganini Diabolus in Musica (review), in «The Strad», January 2011
