= Bow (music) =

Stick-shaped implement with hairs used to play a string musical instrument

A cello bow

In music, a bow (/boʊ/) is a tensioned stick which has hair (usually horse-tail hair) coated in rosin (to facilitate friction) affixed to it. It is moved across some part (generally some type of strings) of a musical instrument to cause vibration, which the instrument emits as sound. The vast majority of bows are used with string instruments, such as the violin, viola, cello, and bass, although some bows are used with musical saws and other bowed idiophones.

== Materials and manufacture ==
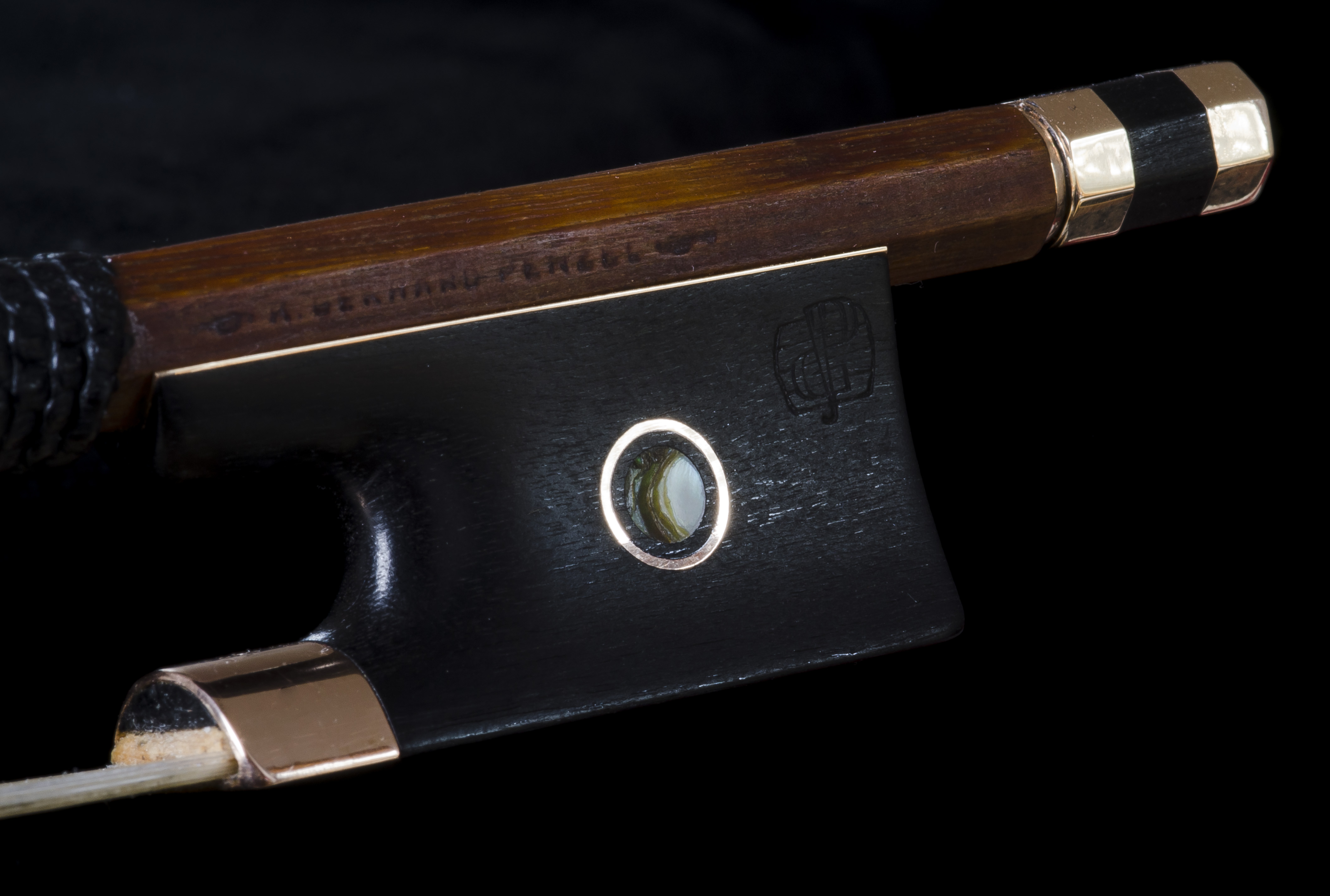
Frog of a modern violin bow (K. Gerhard Penzel)

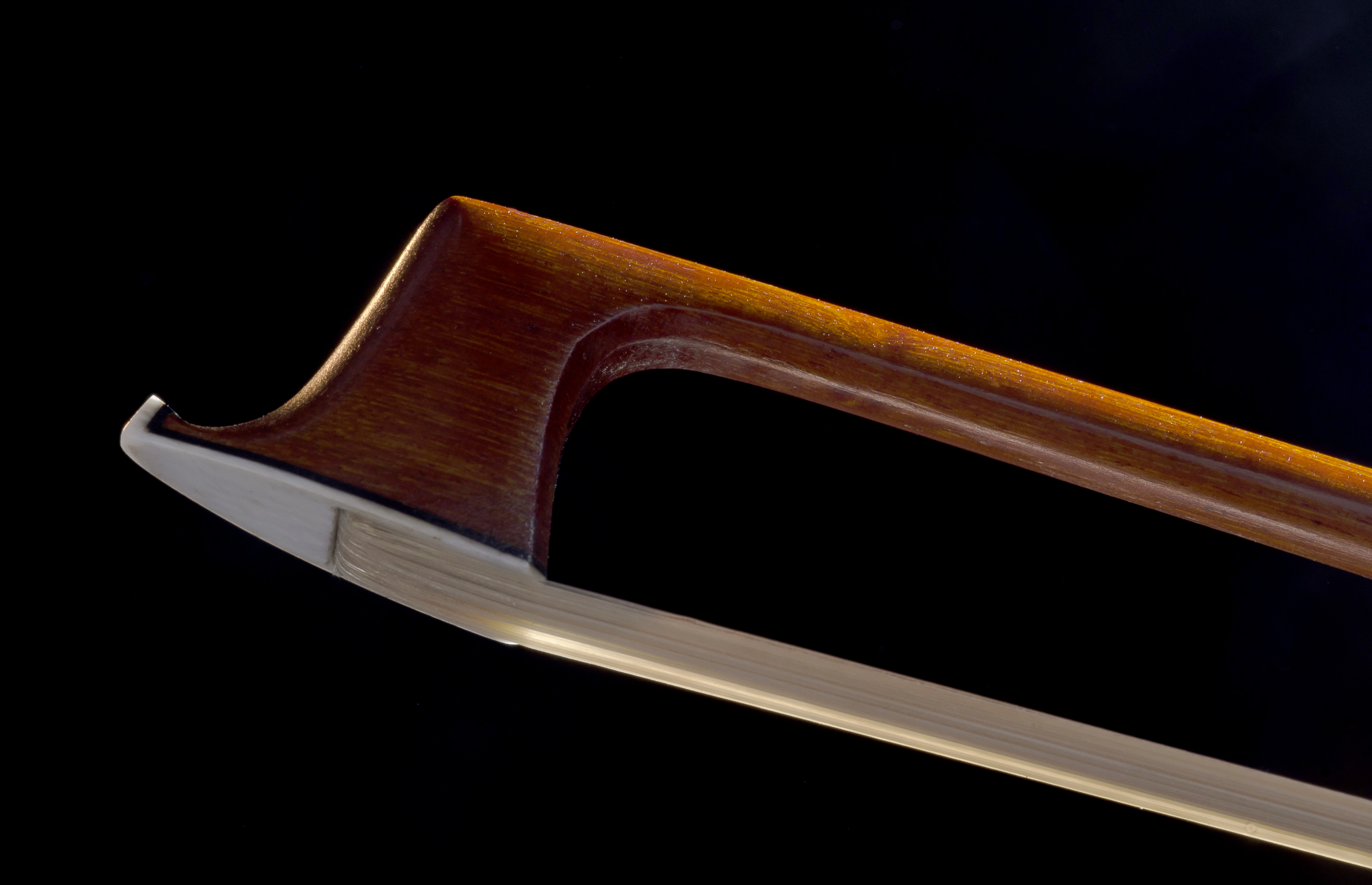
Tip of a modern violin bow (K. Gerhard Penzel)

A bow consists of a specially shaped stick with other material forming a ribbon stretched between its ends, which is used to stroke the string and create sound. Different musical cultures have adopted various designs for the bow. For instance, in some bows a single cord is stretched between the ends of the stick. In the Western tradition of bow making—bows for the instruments of the violin and viol families—a hank of horsehair is normally employed.

The manufacture of bows is considered a demanding craft, and well-made bows command high prices. Part of the bow maker's skill is the ability to choose high quality material for the stick. Historically, Western bows have been made of pernambuco wood from Brazil. However, pernambuco is now an endangered species whose export is regulated by international treaty, so makers are currently adopting other materials: woods such as Ipê (Tabebuia) and synthetic materials, such as carbon fiber epoxy composite and fiberglass.

For the frog, which holds and adjusts the near end of the horsehair, ebony is most often used, but other materials, often decorative, were used as well, such as ivory and tortoiseshell. Materials such as mother of pearl or abalone shell are often used on the slide that covers the mortise, as well as in round decorative "eyes" inlaid on the side surfaces. Sometimes "Parisian eyes" are used, with the circle of shell surrounded by a metal ring. The metal parts of the frog, or mountings, may be used by the maker to mark various grades of bow, ordinary bows being mounted with nickel silver, better bows with silver, and the finest being gold-mounted. (Not all makers adhere uniformly to this practice.) Near the frog is the grip, which is made of a wire, silk, or "whalebone" wrap and a thumb cushion made of leather or snakeskin. The tip plate of the bow may be made of bone, ivory, mammoth ivory, or metal, such as silver.

A bow maker or archetier typically uses between 150 and 200 hairs from the tail of a horse for a violin bow. Bows for other members of the violin family typically have a wider ribbon, using more hairs. There is a widely held belief among string players, neither proven nor disproven scientifically, that white hair produces a "smoother" sound and black hair (used mainly for double bass bows) is coarser and thus produces a "rougher" sound. Lower quality (inexpensive) bows often use nylon or synthetic hair, and some use bleached horse hair to give the appearance of higher quality. Rosin, or colophony, a hard, sticky substance made from resin (sometimes mixed with wax), is regularly applied to the bow hair to increase friction.

In making a wooden bow, the greater part of the woodworking is done on a straight stick. According to James McKean, "the bow maker graduates the stick in precise gradations so that it is evenly flexible throughout". These gradations were originally calculated by François Tourte, discussed below. To shape the curve or "camber" of the bow stick, the maker carefully heats the stick in an alcohol flame, a few inches at a time, bending the heated stick gradually—using a metal or wooden template to get the model's exact curve and shape.

The art of making wooden bows has changed little since the 19th century. Most modern composite sticks roughly resemble the Tourte design. Various inventors have explored new ways of bow-making. The Incredibow, for example, has a straight stick cambered only by the fixed tension of the synthetic hair.

== Types ==
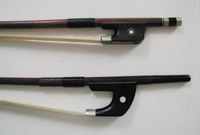
French (top) and German (bottom) double bass bows

Slightly different bows, varying in weight and length, are used for the violin, viola, cello, and double bass.

These are generally variations on the same basic design. However, bassists use two distinct forms of the double bass bow. The "French" overhand bow is constructed like the bow used with other bowed orchestral instruments, and the bassist holds the stick from opposite the frog. The "German" underhand bow is broader and longer than the French bow, with a larger frog curved to fit the palm of the hand. The bassist holds the German stick with the hand loosely encompassing the frog. The German bow is the older of the two designs, having superseded the earlier arched bow. The French bow became popular with its adoption in the 19th century by virtuoso Giovanni Bottesini. Both are found in the orchestra, though typically an individual bass player prefers to perform using one or the other type of bow.

== Bowing ==
The characteristic long, sustained, and singing sound produced by the violin, viola, violoncello, and double bass is due to the drawing of the bow against their strings. This sustaining of musical sound with a bow is comparable to a singer using breath to sustain sounds and sing long, smooth, or legato melodies.

The term used for playing with a bow is "arco", from the Latin word "arcus", meaning bow. Therefore, to play arco is to play with a bow.

In modern practice, the bow is almost always held in the right hand while the left is used for fingering. When the player pulls the bow across the strings (such that the frog moves away from the instrument), it is called a down-bow; pushing the bow so the frog moves toward the instrument is an up-bow (the directions "down" and "up" are literally descriptive for violins and violas). Two consecutive notes played in the same bow direction are referred to as a hooked bow; a down-bow following a whole down-bow is called a retake.

Generally, the player uses down-bow for strong musical beats and up-bow for weak beats. However, this is reversed in the viola da gamba—players of violin family instruments look like they are "pulling" on the strong beats, where gamba players look like they are "stabbing" on the strong beats. The difference may result from the different ways player hold the bow in these instrument families: violin/viola/cello players hold the wood part of the bow closer to the palm, whereas gamba players use the opposite orientation, with the horsehair closer. The orientation appropriate to each instrument family permits the stronger wrist muscles (flexors) to reinforce the strong beat.

String players control their tone quality by touching the bow to the strings at varying distances from the bridge, emphasizing the higher harmonics by playing sul ponticello ("on the bridge"), or reducing them, and so emphasizing the fundamental frequency, by playing sul tasto ("on the fingerboard").

Occasionally, composers ask the player to use the bow by touching the strings with the wood rather than the hair; this is known by the Italian phrase col legno ("with the wood"). Coll'arco ("with the bow") is the indication to use the bow hair to create the sound in the normal way.

== History ==
=== Origin ===
The question of when and where the bow was invented is of interest because the technique of using it to produce sound on a stringed instrument has led to many important historical and regional developments in music, as well as the variety of instruments used.

Pictorial and sculptural evidence from early Egyptian, Indian, Hellenic, and Anatolian civilizations indicate that plucked stringed instruments existed long before the technique of bowing developed. In spite of the ancient origins of the bow and arrow, it would appear that bowed string instruments only developed during a comparatively recent period.

The Chinese yazheng is a zither played with a bow. The earliest Chinese source of the pipe zither yazheng, bowed with a stick, is from the 8th century. The use of rubbing sticks in Central Asia seems to be older. Presumably this playing technique was first used in lutes in Sogdiana around the 6th century, from where it reached China.

Eric Halfpenny, writing in the 1988 Encyclopædia Britannica, says, "bowing can be traced as far back as the Islamic civilization of the 10th century ... it seems likely that the principle of bowing originated among the nomadic horse riding cultures of Central Asia, whence it spread quickly through Islam and the East, so that by 1000 it had almost simultaneously reached China, Java, North Africa, the Near East and Balkans, and Europe." Halfpenny notes that in many Eurasian languages the word for "bridge" etymologically means "horse," and that the Chinese regarded their own bowed instruments (huqin) as having originated with the "barbarians" of Central Asia.

The Central Asian theory is endorsed by Werner Bachmann, writing in The New Grove Dictionary of Music and Musicians. Bachmann notes evidence from a 10th-century Central Asian wall painting for bowed instruments in what is now the city of Kurbanshaid in Tajikistan.

Circumstantial evidence also supports the Central Asian theory. All the elements that were necessary for the invention of the bow were probably present among the Central Asian horse riding peoples at the same time:

- In a society of horse-mounted warriors (the horse peoples included the Huns and the Mongols), horsehair obviously would have been available.
- Central Asian horse warriors specialized in the military bow, which could easily have served the inventor as a temporary way to hold horsehair at high tension.
- To this day, horsehair for bows is taken from places with harsh cold climates, including Mongolia, as such hair offers a better grip on the strings.
- Rosin, crucial for creating sound even with coarse horsehair, is used by traditional archers to maintain the integrity of the string and (mixed with beeswax) to protect the finish of the bow.

(From this information it can be seen that the invention of the bow originates from a Mongol warrior, having just used rosin on his equipment, idly stroking his harp or lyre with a rosin-dusted finger, producing a brief continuous sound, thus inspiring them to restring their bow with horsehair, leading to the earliest example of the bow)

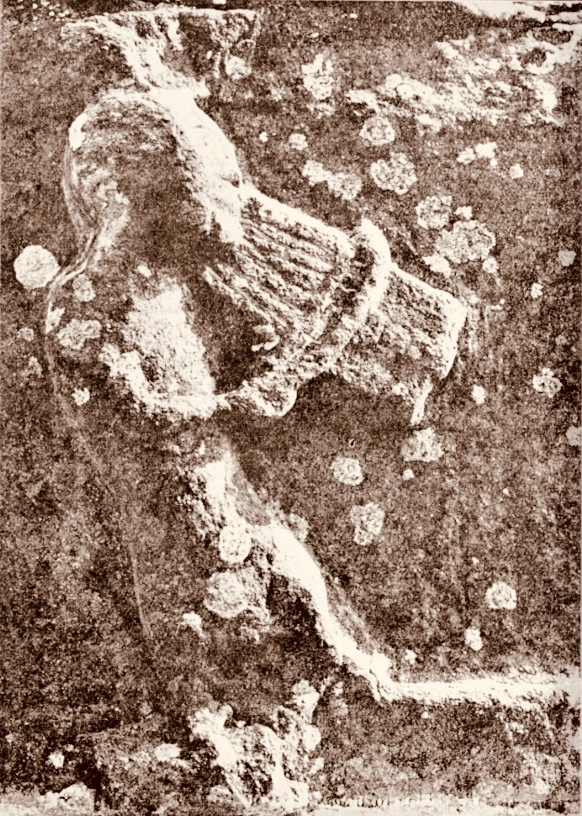
Carving of a bowed musical instrument (cruit or fiddle, 11th century Ireland, Lough Currane)

However the bow was invented, it spread quickly and widely. The Central Asian horse peoples occupied a territory that included the Silk Road, along which merchants and travelers transported goods and innovations rapidly for thousands of miles (including, via India, by sea to Java). This would account for the near-simultaneous appearance of the musical bow in the many locations cited by Halfpenny.

=== Arabic rabāb ===
The Arabic rabāb is a type of a bowed string instrument so named no later than the 8th century and spread via Islamic trading routes over much of North Africa, the Middle East, parts of Europe, and the Far East. It is the earliest known bowed instrument, and the ancestor of all European bowed instruments, including the rebec, lyra and violin.

=== Modern Western bow ===
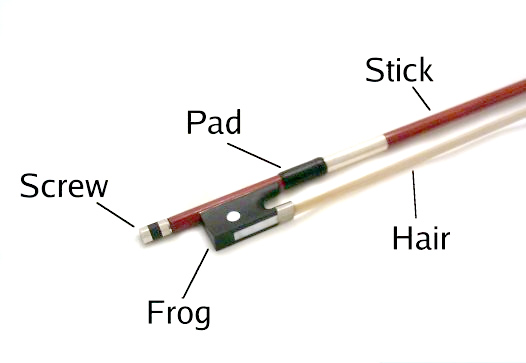
Turning the screw on a modern violin bow causes the frog (heel) to move, which adjusts the tension on the hair.

The kind of bow in use today was brought into its modern form largely by the bow maker François Tourte in 19th-century France. Pernambuco wood, which was imported into France to make textile dye, was found by the early French bow masters to have just the right combination of strength, resiliency, weight, and beauty. According to James McKean, Tourte's bows, "like the instruments of Stradivari, are still considered to be without equal."

=== Historical bows ===
The early 18th-century bow referred to as the Corelli-Tartini model is also referred to as the Italian 'sonata' bow. This basic Baroque bow supplanted by 1725 an earlier French dance bow that was short with a little point. The French dance bow was held with the thumb under the hair and played with short, quick strokes for rhythmic dance music. The Italian sonata bow was longer, from 24 to 28 inches (61–71 cm.), with a straight or slightly convex stick. The head is described as a pike's head, and the frog is either fixed (the clip-in bow) or has a screw mechanism. The screw is an early improvement, indicative of further changes to come. As compared to a modern Tourte-style bow, the Corelli-Tartini model is shorter and lighter, especially at the tip, the balance point is lower down on the stick, the hair more yielding, and the ribbon of hair narrower—about 6 mm wide.

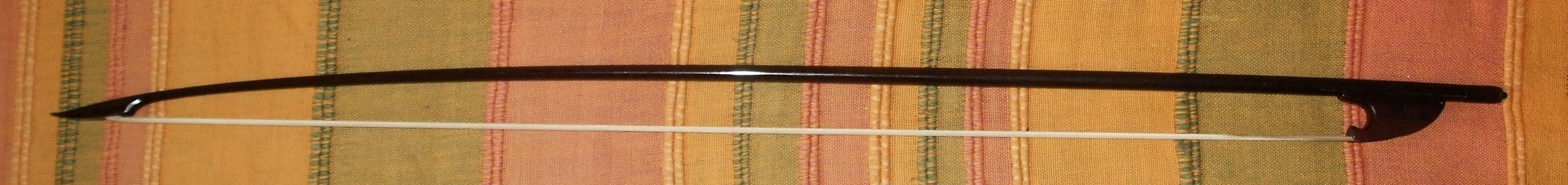
17th-century baroque bow

In the early bow (the Baroque bow), the natural bow stroke is a non-legato norm, producing what Leopold Mozart called a "small softness" at the beginning and end of each stroke.

A lighter, clearer sound is produced, and quick notes are cleanly articulated without the hair leaving the string.

A truly great example of such a bow, described by David Boyden, is part of the Ansley Salz Collection at the University of California at Berkeley. It was made around 1700, and is attributed to Stradivari.

Towards the middle of the century (18th century), there was a move into the Transitional period, the separation of hair from stick became greater, particularly at the head. This greater separation is necessary because the stick becomes longer and straighter, approaching a concave shape.

Up until the advent of the bow by Tourte, there was absolutely no standardization of bow features during this Transitional period, and every bow was different in weight, length and balance. In particular, the heads varied enormously by any given maker.

Another transitional type of bow may be called the Cramer bow, after the violinist Wilhelm Cramer (1746–99) who lived the early part of his life in Mannheim (Germany) and, after 1772, in London. This bow and models comparable to it in Paris, generally prevailed between the gradual demise of the Corelli-Tartini model and the birth of the Tourte—that is, roughly 1750 until 1785. In the view of top experts, the Cramer bow represents a decisive step towards the modern bow.

The Cramer bow and others like it were gradually rendered obsolete by the advent of François Tourte's standardized bow. The hair (on the Cramer bow) is wider than the Corelli model but still narrower than a Tourte, the screw mechanism becomes standard, and more sticks are made from pernambuco, rather than the earlier snakewood, ironwood, and china wood, which were often fluted for a portion of the length of the stick.

Fine makers of these Transitional models were Duchaîne, La Fleur, Meauchand, Tourte père, and Edward Dodd.

The underlying reasons for the change from the old Corelli-Tartini model to the Cramer and, finally, to the Tourte were naturally related to musical demands on the part of composers and violinists. Undoubtedly the emphasis on cantabile, especially the long drawn out and evenly sustained phrase, required a generally longer bow and also a somewhat wider ribbon of hair. These new bows were ideal to fill the new, very large concert halls with sound and worked great with the late classical and the new romantic repertoire.

Today, with the rise of the historically informed performance movement, string players have developed a revived interest in the lighter, pre-Tourte bow, as more suitable for playing stringed instruments made in pre-19th-century style.

=== Stradivarius bows ===
A Stradivari bow, The King Charles IV Violin Bow attributed to the Stradivari Workshop, is currently in the collection of the National Music Museum Object number: 04882, at the University of South Dakota in Vermillion, South Dakota. The Rawlins Gallery violin bow, NMM 4882, is attributed to the workshop of Antonio Stradivari, Cremona, c. 1700. This bow is one of two bows (the other in a private collection) attributed to the workshop of Antonio Stradivari.

=== Other types of bow ===
The Chinese yazheng, yaqin, Korean ajaeng and Ryukyu teisō (kanji: 提箏, hiragana: ていそう) zither are generally played by "bowing" with a rosined stick, which creates friction against the strings without any horsehair. The hurdy-gurdy's strings are similarly set into vibration by means of a "rosin wheel," a wooden wheel that contacts the strings as it is rotated by means of a crank handle, creating a "bowed" tone.

=== The modern Curved Bow ===
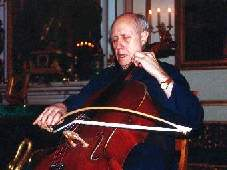
Mstislav Rostropovich with BACH.Bow in 1999

In the 20th century, violinists and cellists used a so-called Curved Bow to enable polyphonic sounds on string instruments. Renowned string instrumentalists such as Emil Telmányi, Rudolf Gaehler, Tossy Spivakovsky, Lorin Maazel, Michael Bach, Gustav Rivinius, Janos Starker and Mstislav Rostropovich, as well as composers such as John Cage, Dieter Schnebel, Walter Zimmermann, Hans Zender and Michael Bach Bachtischa have dealt with this innovation in string instrument playing.

== Maintenance ==
Careful owners always loosen the hair on a bow before putting it away. James McKean recommends that the owner "loosen the hair completely, then bring it back just a single turn of the button." The goal is to "keep the hair even but allow the bow to relax." Over-tightening the bow, however, can also be damaging to the stick and cause it to break.

Since hairs may break in service, bows must be periodically rehaired, an operation usually performed by professional bow makers rather than by the instrument owner.

Bows sometimes lose their correct camber and need to be recambered using the same heating method as is used in the original manufacture.

Lastly, the grip or winding of the bow must occasionally be replaced to maintain a good grip and protect the wood.

These repairs are usually left to professionals, as the head of the bow is extremely fragile, and a poor rehair, or a broken ivory plate on the tip, can lead to ruining the bow.

== Nomenclature ==
In vernacular speech, the bow is occasionally called a fiddlestick. Bows for particular instruments are often designated as such: violin bow, cello bow, and so on.

== As used on percussion ==
Recently, bass and cello bows have been used on certain percussion instruments as an extended technique. This technique is most commonly used on instruments made of metal, particularly, vibraphone, crotales, and cymbals. As these instruments are usually struck with a stick or mallet, utilizing a bow can bring out timbres that would otherwise be unachievable if using standard technique.

== See also ==
- Bariolage
- Bowed guitar
- Curved bow
