= Double stop =

Playing two strings at once on an instrument

Cello triple and quadruple stops from the opening of Jean-Baptiste Bréval's Sonata in C major for cello and piano

The beginning of Mozart's Eine kleine Nachtmusik (1787). The first and second violins have a triple stop notated. The low D is to be bowed only briefly and left to ring. Shortly afterwards, B and G are played normally.

In music, a double stop is the technique of playing two notes simultaneously on a stringed instrument, typically bowed on instruments such as a violin, viola, cello, or double bass, and plucked on a guitar. On instruments such as the Hardanger fiddle it is common and often employed. In performing a double stop, two separate strings are bowed or plucked simultaneously. Although the term itself suggests these strings are to be fingered (stopped), in practice one or both strings may be open.

A triple stop is the same technique applied to three strings; a quadruple stop applies to four strings. Double, triple, and quadruple stopping are collectively known as multiple stopping. When three or more notes are played simultaneously on a plucked string instrument, it is simply called a chord.

Eine kleine Nachtmusik: I. Allegro
Performed by the Advent Chamber Orchestra. Notice the triple stop in the violins at the first chord.

Early extensive examples of the double stop and string chords appear in Carlo Farina's Capriccio Stravagante from 1627, and in certain of the sonatas of Biagio Marini's Op. 8 of 1629.

The double stop is also found in drumming.

== Bowing ==
On instruments with a curved bridge, it is difficult to bow more than two strings simultaneously. Early treatises make it clear that composers did not expect three notes to be played at once, even though the notes may be written in a way as to suggest this. Playing four notes at once is almost impossible. The normal way of playing three or four note chords is to sound the lower notes briefly and allow them to ring while the bow plays the upper notes (a broken chord). This gives the illusion of a true triple or quadruple stop. In forte, however, it is possible to play three notes at once, especially when bowed toward the fingerboard. With this technique more pressure than usual is needed on the bow, so this cannot be practiced in softer passages. This technique is mainly used in music with great force, such as the cadenza-like solo at the beginning of the last movement of Tchaikovsky's violin concerto.

=== Bach bow ===
The "Bach bow" with its arched back uses a system of levers to slacken or tighten bow hair immediately while playing so as to (according to its advocates) facilitate the performance of polyphonic music. Such a bow was conceived early in the 20th century by Arnold Schering and Albert Schweitzer and constructed by Rolf Schröder in 1933. A similar device called the "Vega bow" was built in 1954 under the sponsorship of the violinist Emil Telmányi. Neither of these bows bears any particular relation to historical Baroque bows and neither has ever been widely employed. In 1990, German cellist Michael Bach invented a curved bow for cello, violin, viola and bass. He named it "BACH.Bogen" (BACH.Bow) after his own name.

=== Notation ===
In longer three-note or four-note chords, either the top note or the top two notes are sustained after the lower notes have been played as grace notes. Sometimes the noteheads for the lower notes are filled in to show they are of short duration while the noteheads for the notes to be held are left open. This notation occurs, for example, at the beginning of the fourth movement of Beethoven's fifth symphony.

Simultaneous notes in a single part for an orchestral string section may be played as multiple stops or the individual notes may be distributed among the players within the section. Where the latter is intended, divisi or div. is written above the staff.

== Plucking ==
Guitar double stops are commonly used in rock, blues, metal, and jazz music. They are often played by fingerpicking or hybrid picking, but can also be strummed, or executed with hammer-ons or pull-offs. Jimi Hendrix was especially known for utilizing double stops on the guitar.

When three or more notes are played simultaneously on a plucked string instrument, it is simply called a chord rather than a triple stop or quadruple stop.

== Marching percussion ==
Double stops are commonly used in marching percussion writing. In the case of the snare, a double stop is when a drummer hits the drum with both hands at the same time, while the tenors hit two drums at once. These are usually notated with either single note or a stacked note. A double stop will have the letter B written under the note for sticking.

== See also ==
- Glossary of music terminology
- Dyad (music)
