= Telmányi =

Telmányi is a Hungarian surname. Notable people with the surname include:

- Anne Marie Telmányi (1893–1983), Danish painter and writer
- Emil Telmányi (1892–1988), Hungarian violinist
