= Henri Berthelier =

French classical violinist and pedagogue

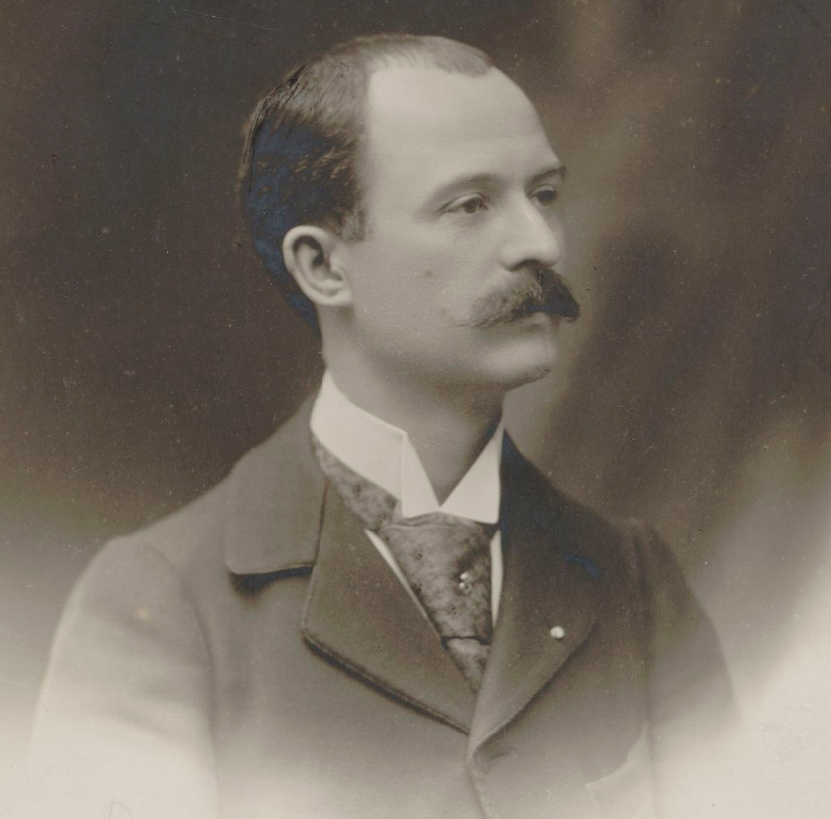
Henri Berthelier

Henri Berthelier (real name Jean-Baptiste, 27 December 1856 – 1918) was a French classical violinist and pedagogue.

== Biography ==
Born in Limoges, Berthelier graduated from the Conservatoire de Paris, where he was a pupil of Jean-Pierre Maurin.

From 1881, he played in the Orchestre de la Société des concerts du Conservatoire of Paris, where between 1887 and 1895, he held the post of concert master. At the same time, he was part of a trio with Isidore Philipp, pianist and Jules-Léopold Loeb, cellist (1852-1933). This trio premiered Camille Saint-Saëns's second trio (1892). Berthelier also performed in chamber music ensembles with the participation of wind instruments under the direction of Paul Taffanel.

In the years 1894–1915, he taught at the Conservatoire de Paris, succeeding his teacher Jean-Pierre Maurin. Among his students were Lucien Durosoir, Marcel Chailley, Axel Theodor Schiøler, Sigrid Lindberg, Elie Spivak, Jeanne Gautier, Georges Frey, Isabella Beaton, Darius Milhaud, Renée Chemet, and Pierre Monteux.

His daughter, Madeleine Berthelier (1904–1998) was a pianist and occasionally accompanied Henryk Szeryng.
