= Brice Catherin =

French composer and cellist

- Born: Brice Alexandre Catherin; 16 October 1981 (age 44)
- Origin: Brussels, Belgium
- Genres: Classical, contemporary, free improvisation, performance art
- Occupation(s): Composer, cellist and performance artist
- Instruments: Cello and electronics
- Years active: 2005-present
- Labels: Pan y Rosas, la Cafetière, Insubordinations, Drone Sweet Drone, Absence of Wax
- Website: https://www.bricecatherin.org

Brice Catherin (born 16 October 1981) is a French composer and cellist.

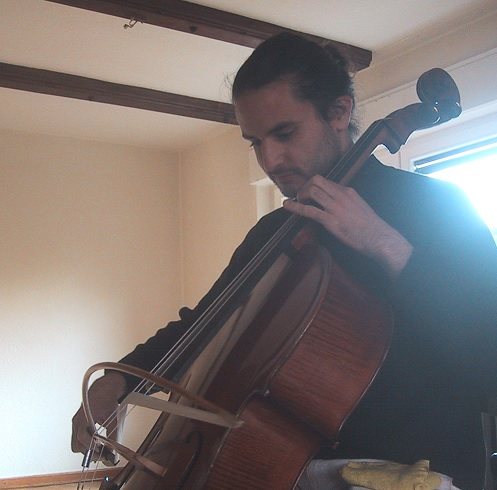
Brice Catherin playing with the BACH.Bow

== Studies and first professional steps ==
Born in Brussels, Belgium, Brice Catherin studied the cello at the Haute Ecole de Musique de Lausanne (Switzerland) with professor Marc Jaermann (cellist of the sine nomine quartet) where he successfully completed his diploma in 2004. At the same time, he was studying composition at the Haute École de Musique of Geneva (Switzerland) with professors Michael Jarrell, Luis Naón and Éric Daubresse. He received his diploma in 2005. The following year he studied at the Basel Musikhochschule with professor Roland Moser.

== Career ==
During 2005-2017, Brice Catherin gave several hundreds of concerts and performances as a cellist, composer, improviser, and performance artist in Europe, Japan, Russia, Iceland and Canada. He also composed about 80 works for soloists for large ensembles, ranging from ten minutes to ten hours duration. He premiered works he commissioned for solo cello or chamber ensembles from composers such as Dror Feiler, Christian Rosset, Evis Sammoutis, Patricia Bosshard, Baudoin de Jaer, Abby Swidler, Jacques Demierre, Arash Yazdani and Ludovic Thirvaudey.

He worked with artists from various backgrounds including dancers (Foofwa d’Imobilité, Corina Pia, Judith Desse), writers (Karelle Ménine, Cléa Chopard), actors (Delphine Rosay), and after works of movie directors (David Bestue and Marc Vives, David OReilly (artist)) and illustrators (Yuichi Yokoyama).

As a composer, Brice Catherin wrote more than 80 instrumental works with or without electronic means.

As an improviser, he is known for engineering the concept of "improvisation laboratories", which refers to performances of constrained improvisations. The constraints can be as different as "playing an instrument you don't know", "playing a building", "improvise music for a cartoon", "improvisation of characters", or "mixing baroque music and free improvisation".

== Selected works for cello with curved bow ==
- Winterreise for Cello and Ensemble (2010)
- Verklärte Nacht for Cello and Ensemble (2012)
- Sequences (2015)
- Mountain (2015)

== Discography ==
- 2007 - Opus 69 (with illustrator Baladi, written contemporary music, la cafetière)
- 2008 - Guns'n'noises (one track with Bristophe for a compilation, limited edition, akouphène)
- 2009 - Nos meilleurs Stockhausen (live recordings of four of the pieces by Stockhausen Aus den sieben Tagen, insubordinations netlabel)
- 2012 - Dismissed Frankenstein - Bristophe (Pan y Rosas)
- 2012 - Winterreise - Brice Catherin (Pan y Rosas)
- 2012 - Number 3 - Brice Catherin (Pan y Rosas)
- 2013 - le fils de la prophétesse - Εἰρήνη, Χρόνος (with Bristophe) (Pan y Rosas)
- 2013 - die ersten zwei Kirchen - Bristophe (Pan y Rosas)
- 2014 - Super Play Station 3 Turbo : Dada - Brice Catherin (Absence of Wax)
- 2014 - Early Works - Brice Catherin (Pan y Rosas)
- 2015 - an die Musik- Brice Catherin (Drone Sweet Drone)
- 2016 - Sequences - Brice Catherin (Pan y Rosas)
- 2016 - Best Hits - Brice Catherin (Pan y Rosas)
