= Hoffleit =

Hoffleit is a surname. Notable people with the surname include:

- Dorrit Hoffleit (1907–2007), American astronomer
- Renate Hoffleit (born 1950), German sculptor and artist
