= Rudolf Gaehler =

German violinist

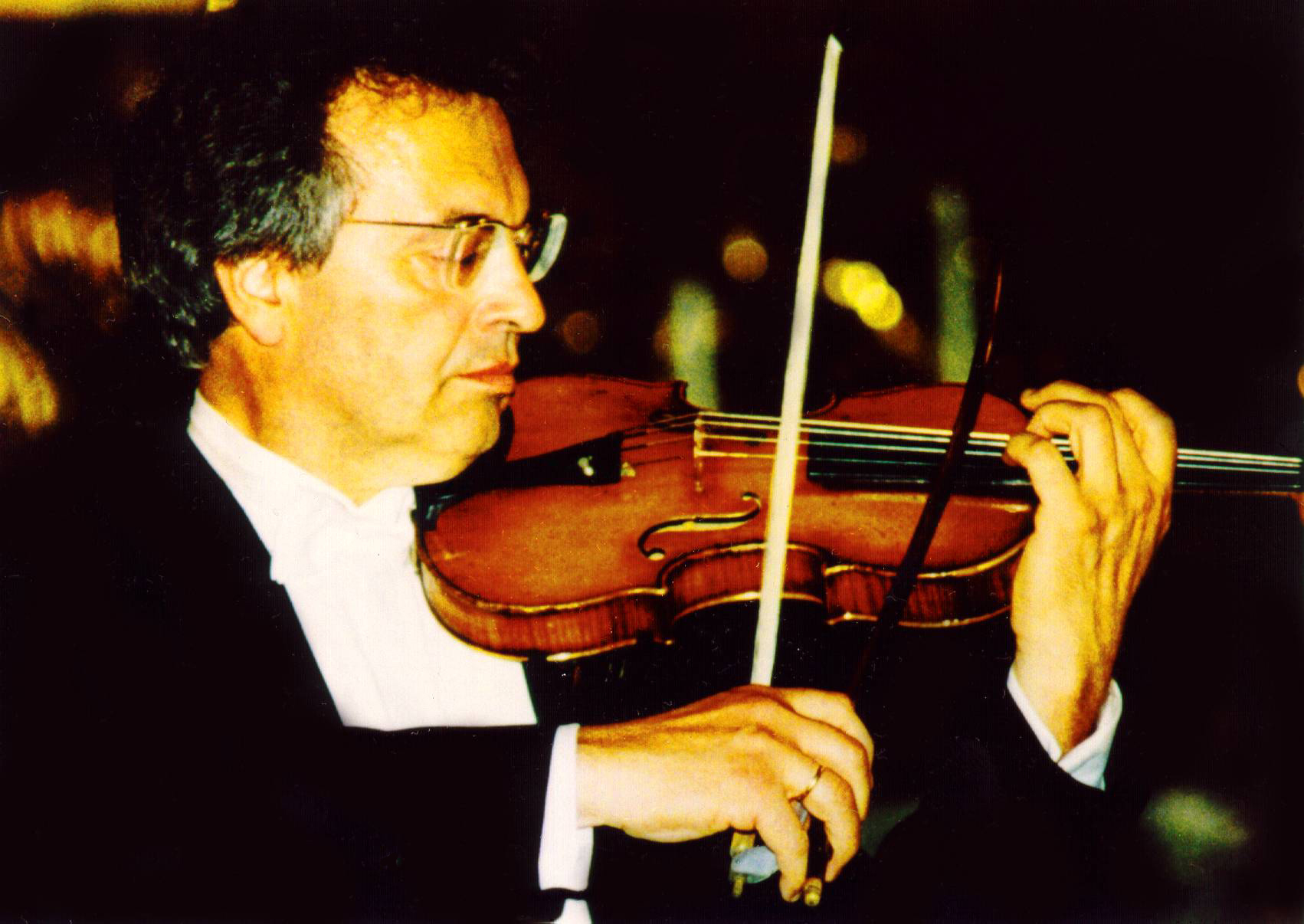
Rudolf Gaehler, Violin with curved bow

Rudolf Gaehler (* February 11, 1941, in Hoyerswerda) is a German violinist. He uses the curved bow for playing polyphonic music.

== Biography ==
Rudolf Gaehler studied the violin with Rolph Schroeder in Kassel and Vittorio Brero in Berlin. He was first concertmaster of the Bonn Beethoven Orchestra for many years.

Rudolf Gaehler is one of the few violinists to master the modern curved-bow technique. Following a concert given by Rudolf Gaehler during the 48th Bach Festival of the New Bach Society in Nuremberg in 1973, Guenther Haußwald, editor of the New Bach Edition, was surprised by the “polyphonic power” Bach gained through an interpretation with the modern curved bow. For a direct comparison of different interpretations, Rudolf Gaehler played at the Wuerzburg 57th Bach Festival in 1982 together with Dimitri Sitkowetski; with Mark Kaplan in the ARD television broadcast on the occasion of Johann Sebastian Bach’s 300th birthday in 1985; and with Thomas Zehetmair during the symposium “Sei Solo” of the European String Teachers Association (President: Sir Yehudi Menuhin) and the international Bach Academy Stuttgart in 1990 (artistic director: Helmut Rilling). Radio and television broadcasts as well as gramophone and CD recordings illustrate the wide range of his repertoire and the rich tonal spectrum produced with the normal, traditional bow as well as with the curved bow Apart from his activities as a soloist, Rudolf Gaehler gives master classes at home and abroad, and appears as a specialist at conferences, symposia and festivals.

== Publications ==
- Der Rundbogen für die Violine – ein Phantom? (The Curved Bow for the Violin - a Phantom?) Con Brio Verlagsgesellschaft, Regensburg 1997, ISBN 3-930079-58-5

== Radio and TV ==
- WDR 3, Köln, Broadcast concerning the curved bow, "Musikszene" July 21, 1998 (radio editor: Friedegard Hürter)
- Johann Sebastian Bach, Sonatas and Partitas for Violin solo, BWV 1001–1006, ARTE NOVA Musikproduktion GmbH, München 1998
