= Tossy Spivakovsky =

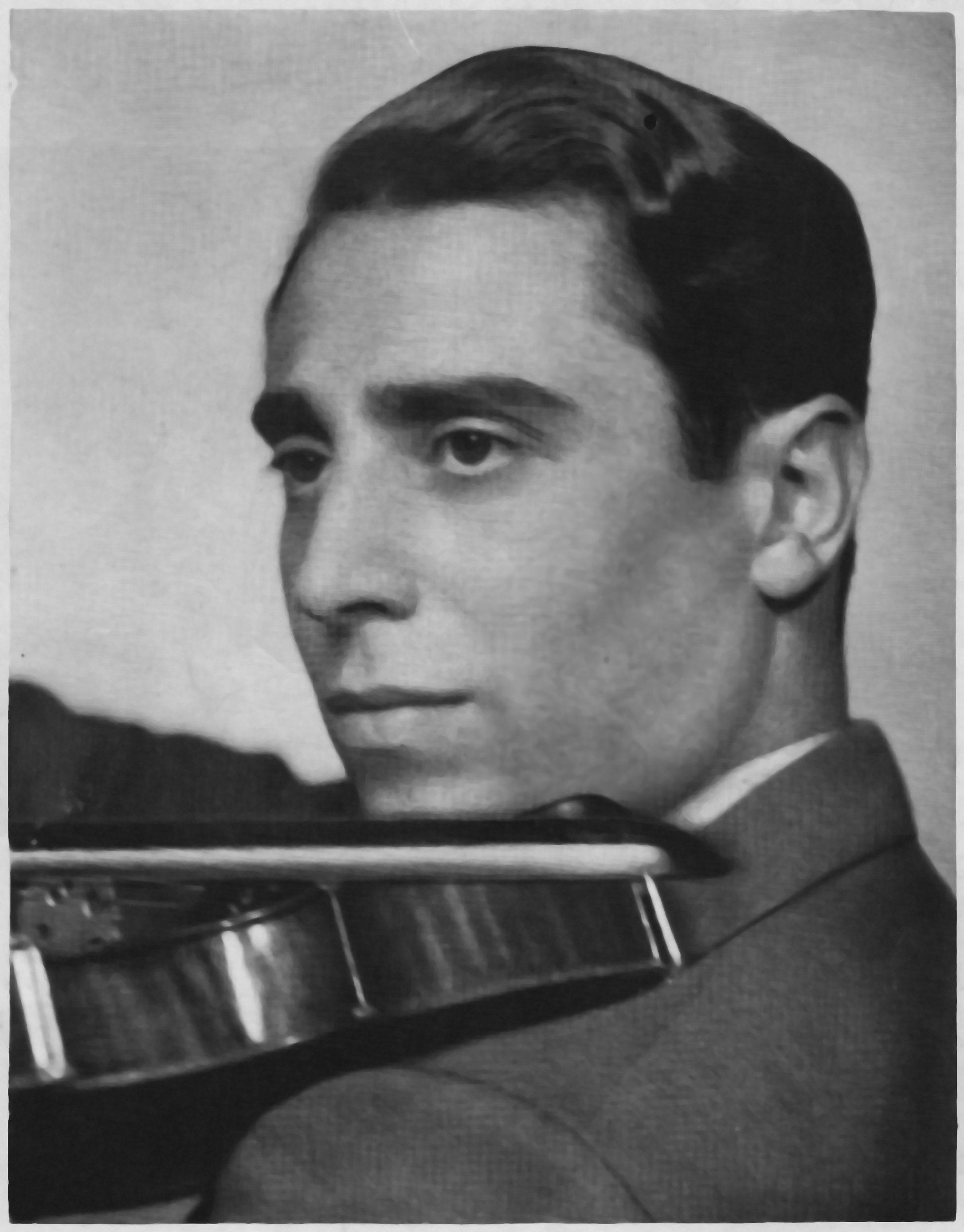

Background information
- Born: Nathan Davidovich Spivak; December 23, 1906; Odessa, Imperial Russia
- Died: July 20, 1998 (aged 91) Westport, Connecticut
- Genre: Classical music
- Occupations: Child prodigy, virtuoso, soloist, teacher
- Instrument: Violin

Nathan "Tossy" Spivakovsky (December 23, 1906 [O.S. December 10, 1906] – July 20, 1998), a Jewish, Russian Empire-born, German-trained violin virtuoso, was considered one the greatest violinists of the twentieth century.

== Biography ==
Tossy Spivakovsky was born in Odessa, which in 1906 was still part of the Russian Empire. Under the increasing threat of pogroms his family moved to Berlin, where he studied with Arrigo Serato privately and later with Willy Hess at the Berliner Hochschule für Musik. A violin prodigy, he gave his first recital at age 10. Together with his elder brother Jacob "Jascha" (1896–1970), a renowned concert pianist, Tossy made his first European concert tour at age 13, performing as soloist with orchestras in a number of countries including Holland, England, Norway, Sweden, and Denmark, in 1919, where the brothers played for Danish royalty. At only 18, after being talent spotted by Wilhelm Furtwängler, Spivakovsky became the youngest concertmaster hired by the Berlin Philharmonic. Two years later he left to pursue a solo career in Europe.

During the 1920s, he and his brother Jascha performed together as the Spivakovsky Duo. In 1930, Tossy and Jascha established the highly acclaimed Spivakovsky-Kurtz Trio together with cellist Edmund Kurtz. The trio was on a tour of Australia in 1933 when the Nazi Party took power in Germany, temporarily ending Spivakovsky's European career. As a result he remained in Melbourne, Australia. He sent a marriage proposal by telegram to a girl he had met in Germany, Dr. Erika Lipsker (or Zarden), philologist and Renaissance historian, who sailed to Melbourne in 1934 and became his wife of 63 years. All three members of the Spivakovsky-Kurtz trio joined the teaching staff of the University of Melbourne Conservatorium of Music.

The youngest of nine, Spivakovsky belonged to a musical as well as artistic family. His eldest brother Simeon, a photographer and sculptor, also produced fine drawings. His brother Albert, a distinguished pianist, also played the cello and conducted orchestras in Germany and Denmark. Another brother, the violinist and cellist Isaac 'Issy' (1902–1977), who had studied violin under Willy Hess, and cello with Hugo Becker and Gregor Piatigorsky, also migrated to Australia in 1934, and for 28 years (1937–1965) taught violin, viola and cello at Scotch College, Melbourne. Adolf (1891–1958), a bass-baritone, also migrated to Melbourne in 1934 and taught at the University Conservatorium where his students included the sopranos Glenda Raymond and Sylvia Fisher. Of Spivakovsky's three sisters—Claire, Esfira and Betty—Claire and Betty were said to have had fine singing voices.

In 1939, to further his career, Spivakovsky decided to leave Australia with his wife and baby daughter and migrate to the U.S. They boarded a ship, the S.S. Monterey, that was about to make its last Pacific voyage to the U.S. before all civilian traffic got stopped by WWII. After arriving in California, they settled in New York, New York, and in 1940, Spivakovsky made his New York debut at Town Hall. He became concertmaster of the Cleveland Orchestra in 1942, under Artur Rodziński, in that capacity also often performing as soloist. In 1943, Rodziński invited him to present the premiere United States performance of Bartók's Violin Concerto No. 2 in Cleveland, Ohio. Spivakovsky subsequently gave this work its first performances in New York and San Francisco. Bartók himself described Spivakovsky's New York performance of his violin concerto as "first rate". His rendition of this concerto launched his U.S. career as soloist. According to the critic Alfred Frankenstein of the San Francisco Chronicle, Spivakovsky's was "the finest violin playing of a generation". The critic Virgil Thomson of the New York Herald Tribune wrote: "Such unfailing nobility of tone, such evenness of coloration through the scale and, most extraordinary of all, such impeccable pitch...left one a little gasping." "Was this the best since Heifetz," asked Frankenstein after a 1948 performance of the Bartók Violin Concerto, "or was this just the best, period?" Following Spivakovsky's New York performance of the violin concerto by Gian Carlo Menotti, a review appearing in the May 3, 1954 edition of Time stated: "As always, his tone was luxuriant, his pitch impeccable, and he brought the music to full-blooded life." The same article referred to Spivakovsky as "one of the most brilliant violinists alive."

Spivakovsky was soloist in the premiere performances of Leon Kirchner's Sonata Concertante and David Diamond's Canticle and Perpetual Motion. Accompanied by the New York Philharmonic Orchestra, he gave the New York premieres of violin concerti by Frank Martin and Carl Nielsen. He composed his own cadenzas for the Beethoven violin concerto that were published in 1964 by Breitkopf & Härtel, Wiesbaden, No. 6460. He also composed cadenzas for all five Mozart violin concerti that were published in 1967 by Wilhelm Zimmermann, Frankfurt am Main. For more than four decades, represented by Columbia Artists Management, he travelled extensively throughout the U.S., Canada, South America, Israel, and Europe giving solo performances. He also found time to teach violin and chamber music at the Juilliard School in New York City from 1974 to 1989.

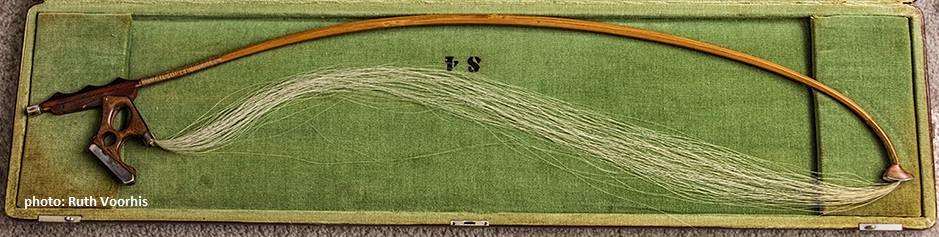
Vega Bach bow for Violin played by Spivakovsky

In order to draw from his instrument the richest, most brilliant tone possible, Spivakovsky developed a method of bowing that was described in detail in a book entitled "The Spivakovsky Way of Bowing," by Gaylord Yost. In a lifelong effort to perform his repertoire just as the composers wished their music to be performed, he sought and researched their original sheet music. When he made the discovery that Bach wanted certain chords in his solo violin works played without arpeggiation, he wrote an article entitled "Problem of Arpeggiation in Bach's Music for Solo Violin" that was published in the February 1954 issue of Musical America. A later article by Spivakovsky, entitled "Polyphony in Bach's Works for Solo Violin," published in 1967 in The Music Review, Vol. 28, No. 4, provides the evidence for Bach's preference. Upon hearing, in 1957, a recording by Emil Telmányi of Bach's works for solo violin played with a curved bow, Spivakovsky purchased a Vega Bach-bow from Knud Vestergaard of Denmark for himself. Using the curved bow for Bach enabled him from then on to execute the whole four-string chords of the Bach sonatas and partitas with greater ease and sonority. In a spoken introduction to his live performance of the "Chaconne," now released by DOREMI, Spivakovsky explained his motivation for the use of the curved bow.

== Honorary doctorates ==
- Fairfield University, Fairfield, Connecticut, April 26, 1970
- The Cleveland Institute of Music, Cleveland, Ohio, June 5, 1975

== LP recordings ==
For the following LP recordings, Tossy Spivakovsky's violin, which he sold in 1972, was The Macmillan Stradivari of 1721:

- J.S. Bach, Sonata No. 1 in G minor, unaccompanied, on Columbia LP Masterworks, 1950.
- Bartók, Violin Sonata No. 2, Roumanian Dances, with Artur Balsam, piano, on Concert Hall Society. This was the first studio recording of Bartók's Violin Sonata No. 2 with Artur Balsam, issued in late 1947. (The earlier version by the composer accompanying Joseph Szigeti was a live performance, and only issued later.)
- Beethoven, Violin Sonata No. 8 in G major, Op. 30, with Robert Cornman, piano, on Columbia LP Masterworks, 1950.
- Beethoven, Violin Sonata No. 10 in G major, Op. 96, with Rudolf Firkusny, piano, on Columbia LP Masterworks, 1951.
- Leon Kirchner, Concerto for Violin, Cello, 10 Winds & Percussion, conducted by the composer with Aldo Parisot, cello, on Epic Stereorama.
- Menotti, Violin Concerto, conducted by Charles Munch with the Boston Symphony Orchestra on RCA Victor, 1952.
- Leroy Robertson, Violin Concerto, conducted by Maurice Abravanel with the Utah Symphony Orchestra on Vanguard.
- Sibelius, Violin Concerto in D minor conducted by Tauno Hannikainen with the London Symphony Orchestra on Everest.
- Stravinsky, Violin Concerto, conducted by Maurice Abravanel with the Utah Symphony Orchestra on Vanguard.
- Tchaikovsky, Violin Concerto in D major, conducted by Walter Goehr with the London Symphony Orchestra on Everest.

== Recordings on CD ==
- Bartók Violin Concerto #2 on CD #6 of "Pierre Monteux in Boston" set: "Treasure of Concert Performances 1951–1958" on CODAEX Records.
- Collection of short pieces by Bazzini, Mouret, Raff, Gluck, Bloch, Kreisler, Paganini, Dvořák, Beethoven, Brahms, Wieniawski, Sarasate on PEARL, Pavilion Records LTD. (Reissued from a number of Spivakovsky's recordings that were made on the Parlophone and Decca labels during the 1920s. He was accompanied on the piano by his brothers Jascha and Albert.)
- Paganini 24 Caprices for Violin & Piano, with Lester Taylor, piano, on Omega Record Group, Inc.
- Sibelius Violin Concerto conducted by Tauno Hannikainen with the London Symphony Orchestra on Omega, Everest Record Group, Inc.
- Stravinsky Violin Concerto conducted by Maurice Abravanel with the Utah Symphony Orchestra on Vanguard Classics, Omega Record Group, Inc.
- Tchaikovsky Violin Concerto conducted by Walter Goehr with the London Symphony Orchestra on Vanguard Classics, Omega Record Group, Inc.

== Live recordings on CD ==
Production, restoration and remastering from reel-to-reel tapes and acetate, by DOREMI.

- Bach Chaconne for violin solo from Partita No. 2, Live Broadcast, performed with a VEGA BACH-Bow, Swedish Radio, Stockholm, January 26, 1969
- Beethoven Violin Concerto New York Philharmonic Orchestra conducted by Amerigo Marino, December 21, 1963
- Brahms Violin Concerto New York Philharmonic Orchestra conducted by Josef Krips, December 7, 1961
- Mendelssohn Violin Concerto New York Philharmonic Orchestra conducted by Paul Paray, November 17, 1956
- Bartók Violin Concerto No. 2 New York Philharmonic Orchestra conducted by Artur Rodziński, originally recorded on acetate, October 14, 1943
- Prokofiev Violin Concerto No. 2 New York Philharmonic Orchestra conducted by Thomas Schippers, November 19, 1959
- Martin, Frank Violin Concerto New York Philharmonic Orchestra conducted by Robert La Marchina, December 19, 1963
- Tchaikovsky Violin Concerto Stockholm Philharmonic Orchestra conducted by Nils Grevillius, February 8, 1960
- Schuman, William Violin Concerto Buffalo Philharmonic Orchestra conducted by Lukas Foss, January 23, 1966

== Video ==
Spivakovsky, along with Artur Balsam, can be seen and heard playing most of Bartok's Violin Sonata No. 2 on Episode 7 of Aaron Copland's WNET series Music in the Twenties

== Sources ==
- Jascha Spivakovsky, Australian Dictionary of Biography
- Kozinn, Allan (July 27, 1998). "Tossy Spivakovsky, 91, Violinist Who Created Bowing Technique". The New York Times.
- Music web international
