= Luis Naón =

Luis Naón (born 1961 in La Plata, Argentina) is a French-naturalised conductor, music educator, composer and musicologist.

He studied at the National University of La Plata, the Pontifical Catholic University of Argentina and the Conservatoire de Paris. In 2008, he composed Le Tyran, le Luthier et le Temps, a piece for mezzo-soprano, tenor, narrator, mandolin, harp guitar and children's choir.
