= Renate Hoffleit =

German sculptor and artist

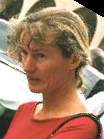
Renate Hoffleit in 1992

Renate Hoffleit (born 1950 in Stuttgart) is a German sculptor and artist. She lives and works mainly in Stuttgart, Germany.

== Biography ==
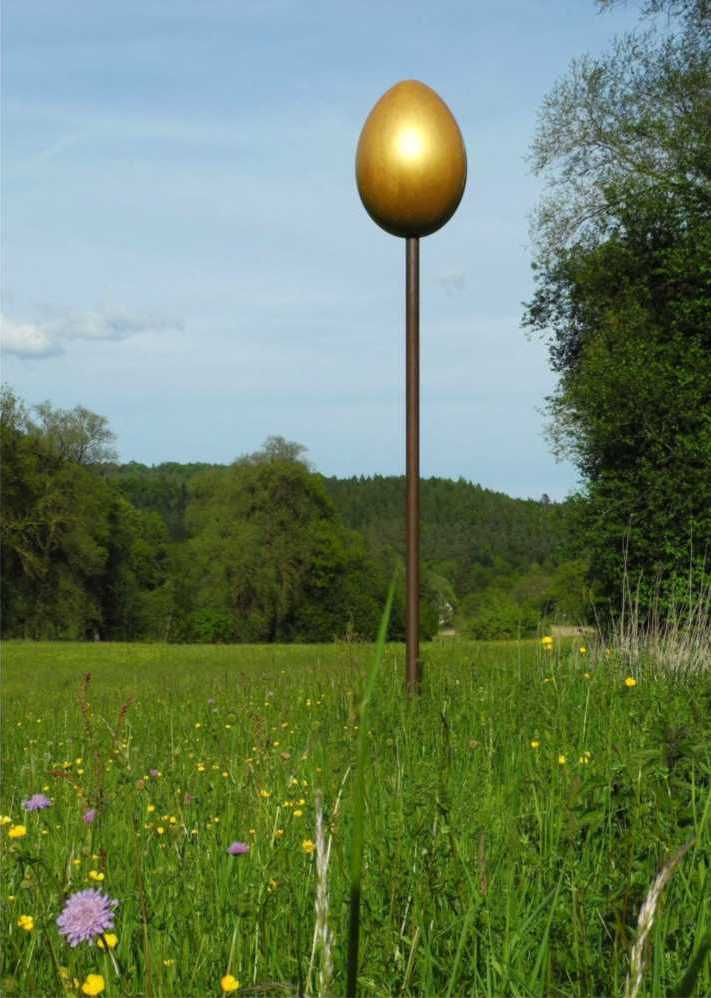
Renate Hoffleit, das goldene ei, Aichtal/Landkreis Böblingen, Germany

Renate Hoffleit studied graphics, free graphic art and sculpture at the Staatliche Akademie der Bildenden Künste, Stuttgart. From 1979 onwards, she developed her marble and light sculptures, and since 1987 she has created square design, sculptures and fountains in public spaces. She started her site-specific audio-visual installation Vertonungen in 1992. Since 1993, she has been working with Michael Bach Bachtischa creating site-specific sound installations and string installations, accompanied by performances.

== Exhibitions ==
Renate Hoffleit's works are on display at home and abroad.

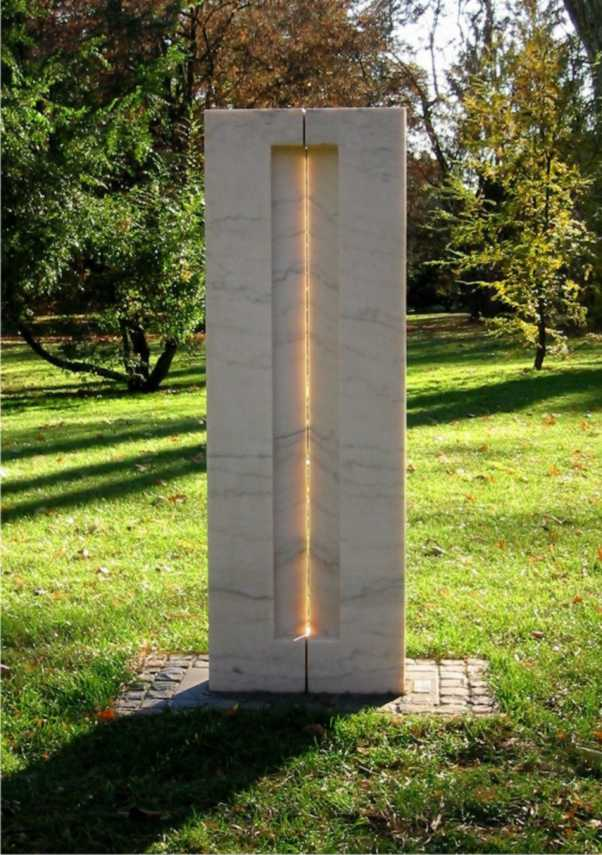
Renate Hoffleit, Mittags-Stele, University of Hohenheim, Stuttgart

== Works exhibited in museums and public collections ==
- Württembergische Staatsgalerie Stuttgart
- Ministerium für Wissenschaft und Kunst, Stuttgart
- Deutsche Akademie Villa Massimo, Rome
- Djerassi Foundation, Woodside (Kalifornien), USA
- The Hakone Open-Air Museum Tokyo, Japan
- Informationsbüro des Landes Baden-Württemberg, Brussels
- Städtische Kunsthalle Mannheim
- Städtische Museen Heilbronn, Germany
- Städtische Kunsthalle Recklinghausen, Germany
- Kunstsammlung Lütze Sindelfingen, Germany
- Kunstsammlung der Stadt Fellbach, Germany
- Landratsamt Böblingen, Germany

== Works in public spaces ==
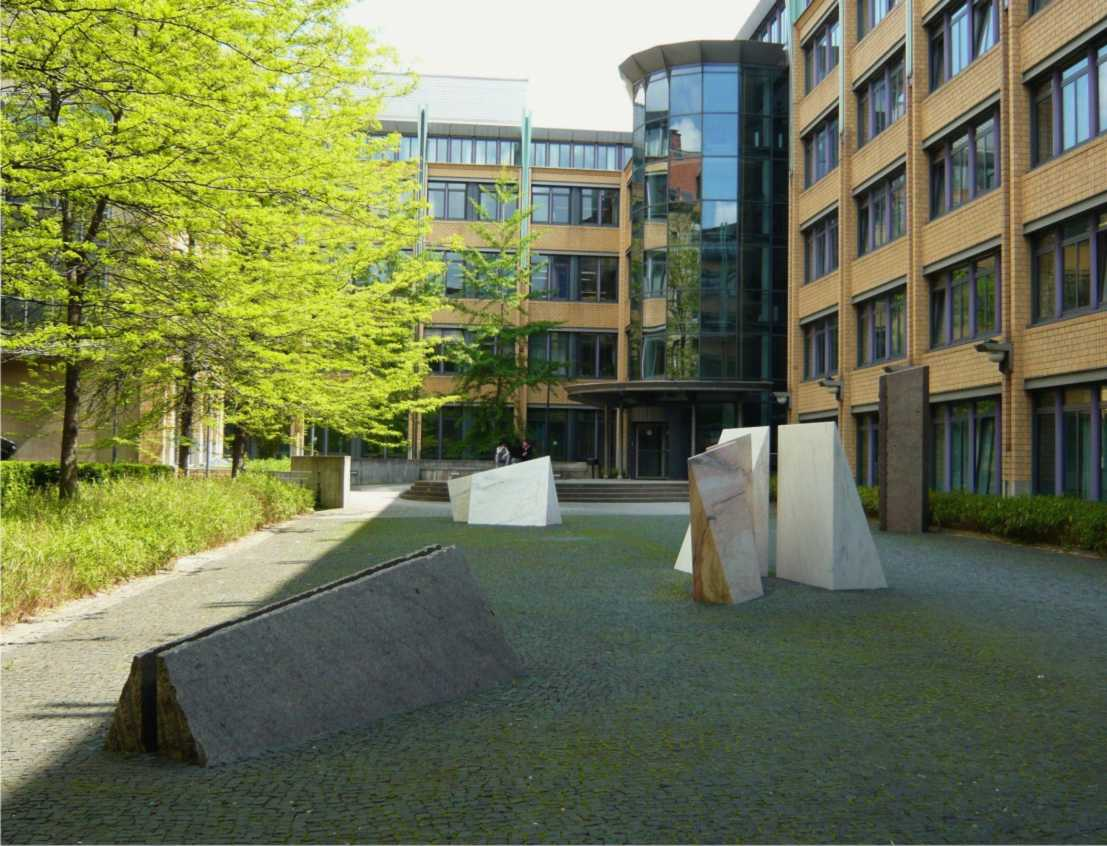
Renate Hoffleit, Skulpturenfeld, Amts- und Landessozialgericht Stuttgart

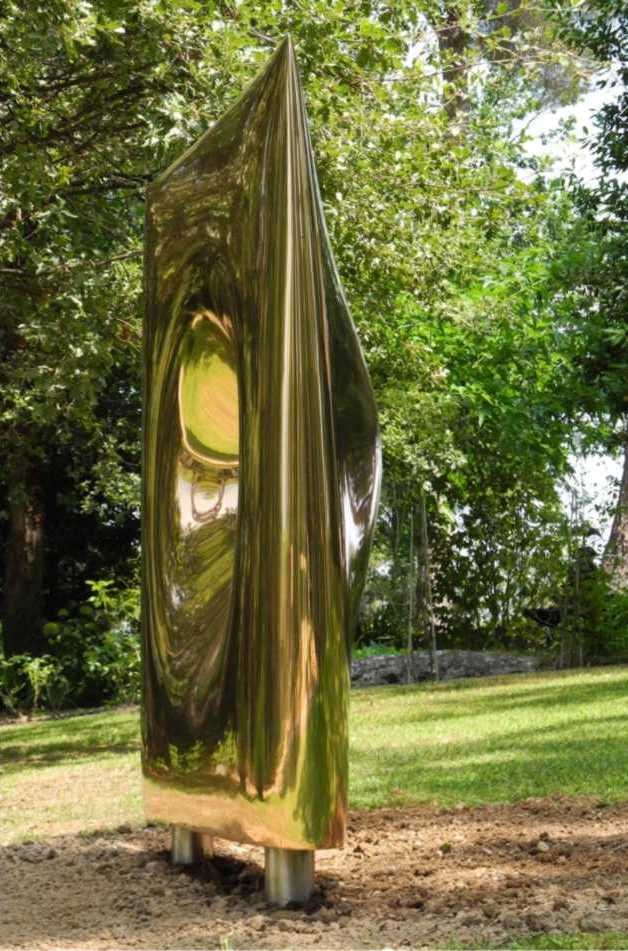
Renate Hoffleit, Convexe-Concave La Tour, residence near Nice, France

- Skulpturenfeld, Amts- und Landessozialgericht, Stuttgart
- Stufenanlange mit 8 Wasser / Klang-Säulen, Kornwestheim
- Wasserklangbrunnen Magstadter Duo, Magstadt
- Vier-Säulen-Brunnen and Wandbrunnen, Klinik Löwenstein, Germany
- Konvex / Konkav (2/III), main station Heilbronn
- Stufenanlage mit 8 Türmen, Kornwestheim, Germany

== Landscape-related works ==
- Feuer Im Sequoia, Djerassi Foundation, California, USA
- alb-eier, Schwäbische Alb, „Der Grosse Alb-Gang“, Landkreis Esslingen, Germany
- Konvex / Konkav (1/III), Hakone Open Air Museum, Japan
- Mittags-Stele in the Exotic Garden of the University in Hohenheim, Germany
- Convexe / Concave La Tour, estate near Nice, France
- Wiesen-Eier, Das Goldene Ei Aichtal (Sculptoura), Landkreis Böblingen, Germany

== Audio-visual works ==
- Leben ist Laut – Vertonungen außen-innen-außen, Donaueschinger Musiktage, 2000
- Seefelder Vertonungen, Klangprojekt Hörfeld, Schloss Seefeld, 2004
- Urspring, Waves, Festival KlangRaum Stuttgart, 2011

== String Installations ==
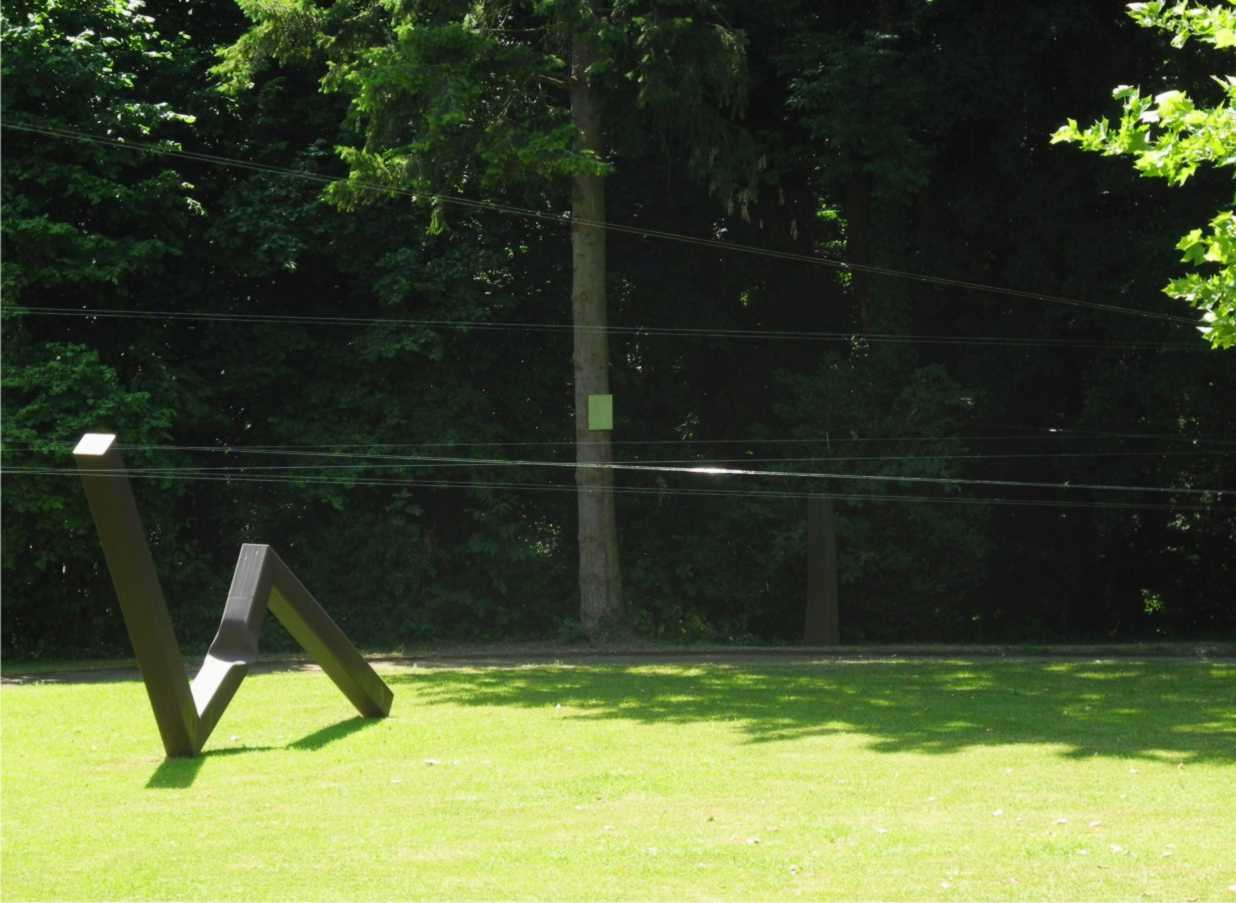
Renate Hoffleit and Michael Bach Bachtischa, genius loci gehört, String Installation, Domnick Foundation, Nürtingen, Germany

In collaboration with Michael Bach Bachtischa

- One8 and 15 Strings, Donaueschinger Musiktage, 1994
- Notrepos, Schloss Monrepos, Ludwigsburg, Germany, 1995
- Achill Strings, Achill Island, Irland, 1996
- Traffic Tubes and Soloists, Treffpunkt Rotebühlplatz, Stuttgart, 1997
- EFeu-Klänge, Stadtgalerie Saarbrücken, 1997
- Strings of Kaukab Spring, Misgav Festival, Israel, 1998
- ... die Leere zwischen den Steinen klingt ..., Skulpturenfeld, Stuttgart, 1999
- Le Chien Noir, Abey in Murbach, France, Festival Printemps Rhénan, 2000
- Schloss Kapfenburg besaitet ..., Opening Ceremony of the Internationale Musikschulakademie Kulturzentrum Schloss Kapfenburg, Germany, 2000 (Guinness-Buch der Rekorde [1])
- Strings and Pillars, Opening Ceremony of the Fuchu Art Museum, Tokyo, 2000
- Jungfernfahrt, Festival Berlin Biennale 2001, Berlin
- Habichtswaldsaiten, Festival Tonale 2011, Kassel
- genius loci gehört und genius loci concertante, Domnick Foundation, Nürtingen, 2014 (Project Garten Eden of the KulturRegion Stuttgart)
- (zwischen e und f)², Stadtbibliothek Stuttgart, 2015

== Awards, prizes and scholarships ==
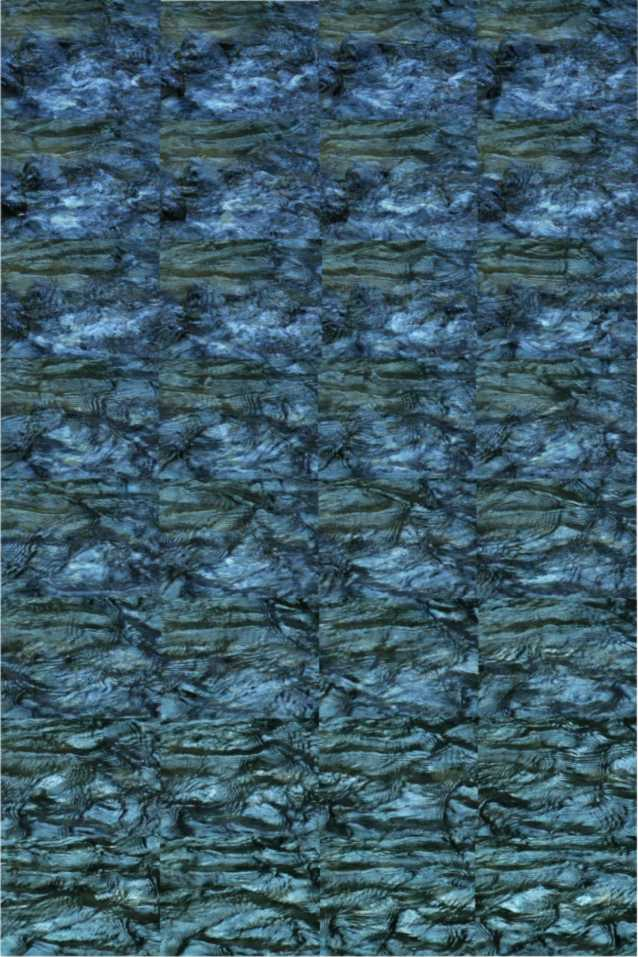
Renate Hoffleit, water stills and sounds, tableaux with video-stills, detail

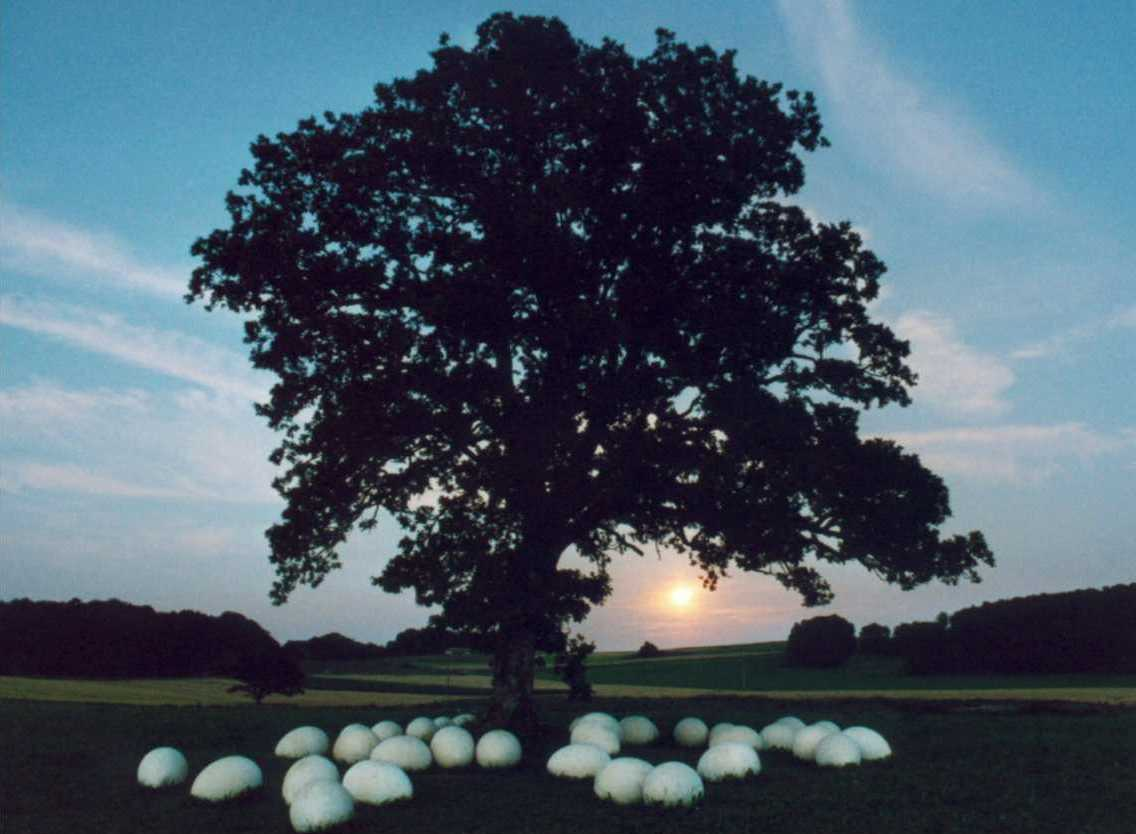
Renate Hoffleit, alb-eier, Der große Albgang, Landkreis Esslingen, Germany

For her artistic work, Renate Hoffleit obtained scholarships from the Kunstfonds e.V., Bonn foundation and Kunststiftung Baden-Wuerttemberg as well as scholarships for study visits at the Deutsche Akademie Villa Massimo Casa Baldi, Olevano, Italy, and the Djerassi Foundation, USA, among others. She received the Utsukushi-ga-hara Museum Award, Japan, for her Konvex-Konkav sculpture made of light-reflecting, polished bronze. For their audio projects, Renate Hoffleit and Michael Bach Bachtischa obtained support from the Irish Arts Council, Ireland, the Heinrich-Böll-Stiftung and the Innovationsfonds Kunst Baden-Wuerttemberg, among others.

== Gallery ==
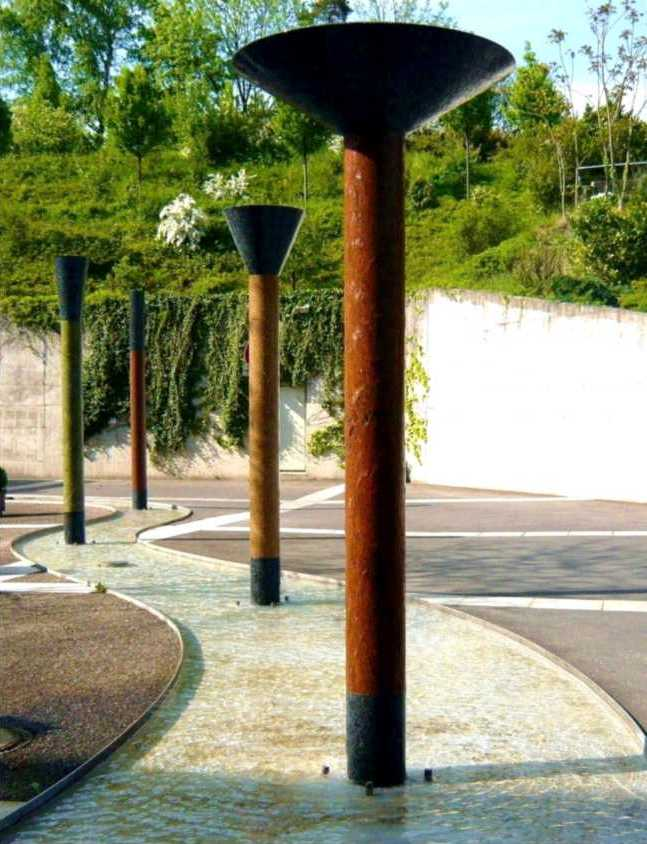
Vier-Säulen-Brunnen, Klinik Löwenstein, Germany

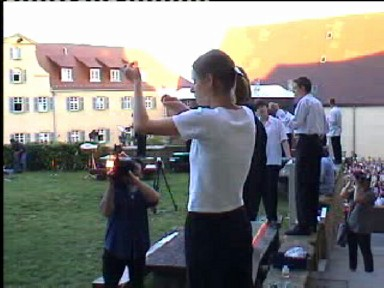
Schloss Kapfenburg besaitet... a project by Renate Hoffleit and Michael Bach Bachtischa, 2000

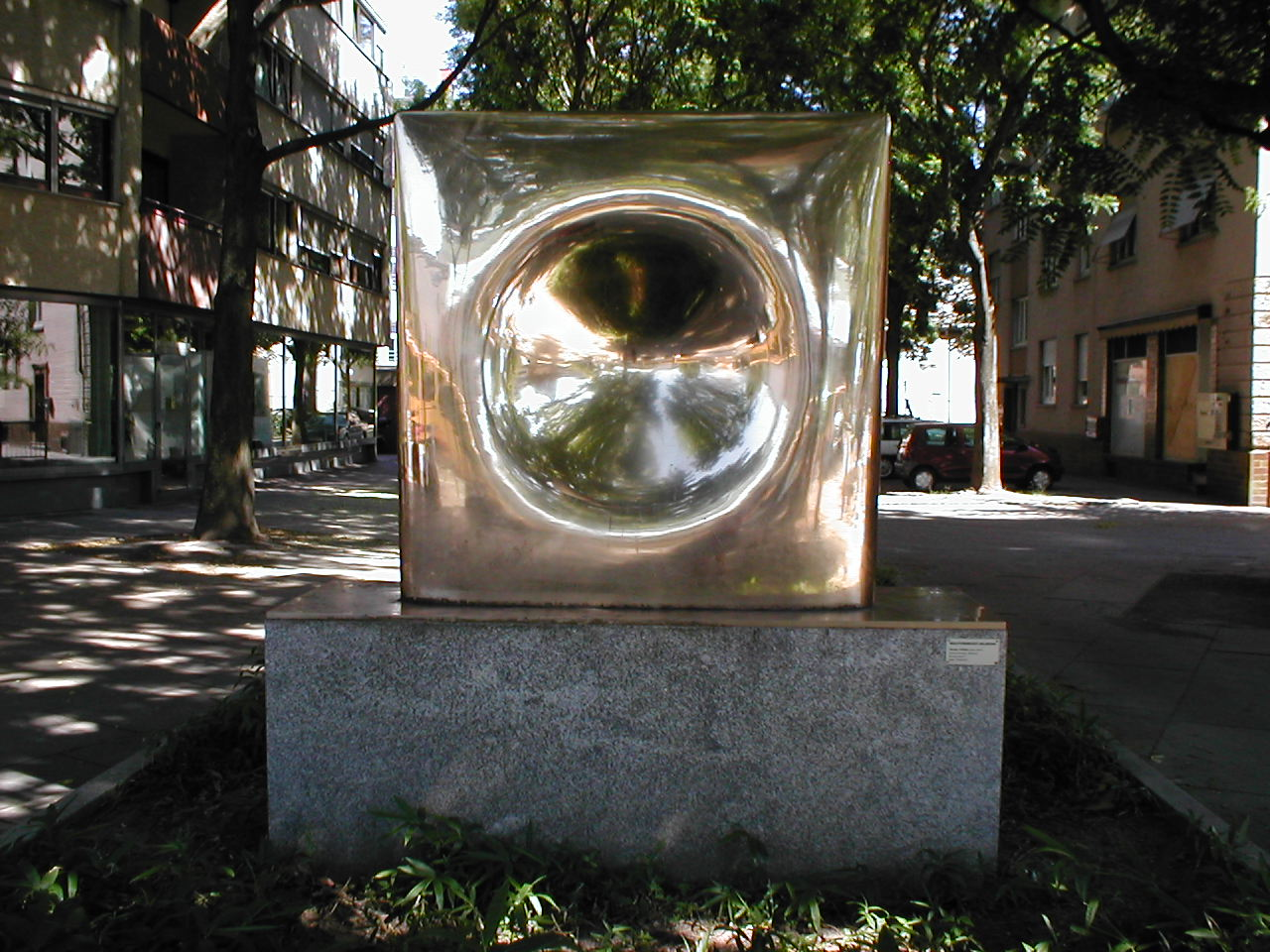
Sculpture Konvex / Konkav in Heilbronn, 1989/93

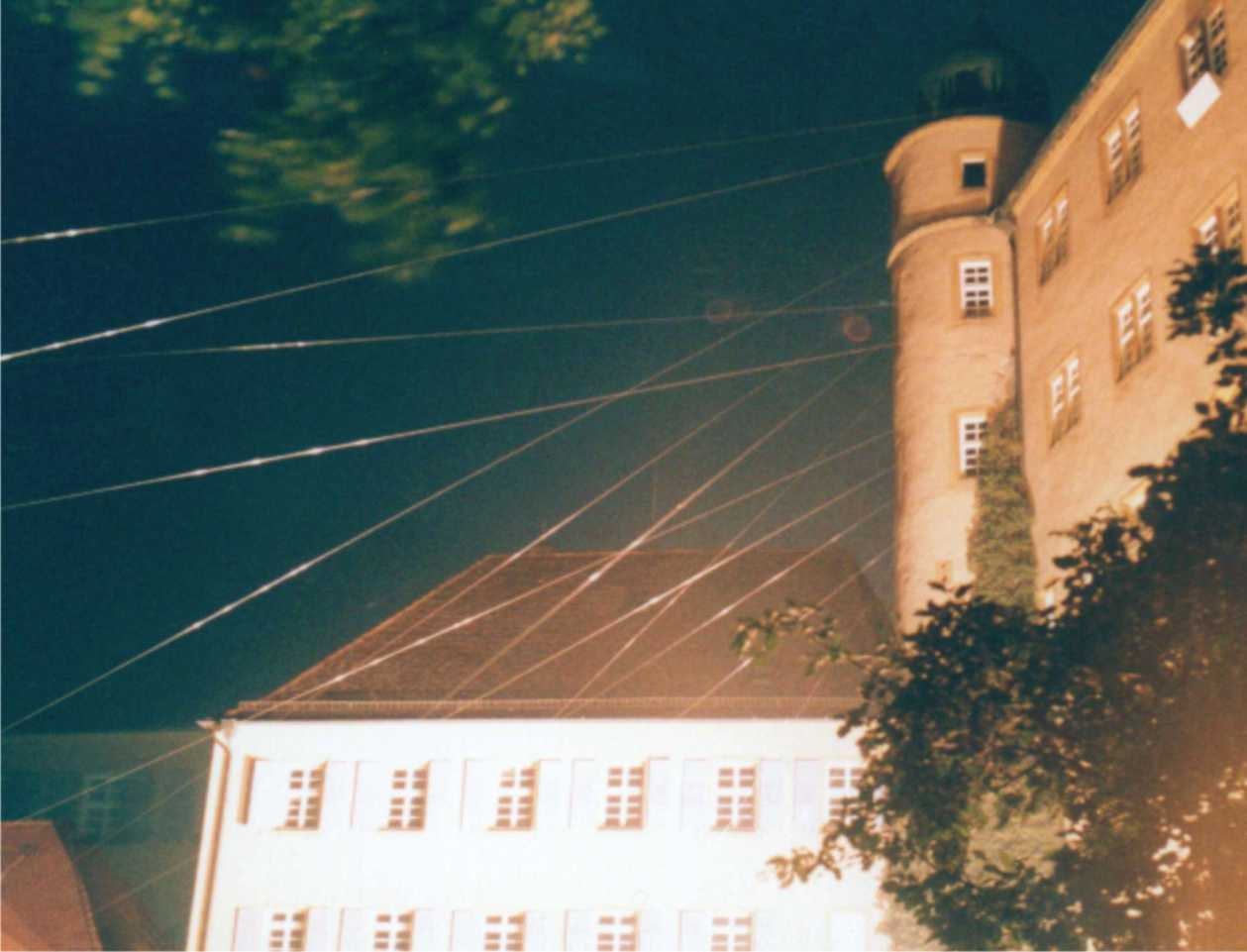
Renate Hoffleit and Michael Bach Bachtischa, Schloss Kapfenburg besaitet... by night, 2000
