= Concertmaster =

First violinist and second leader of the orchestra

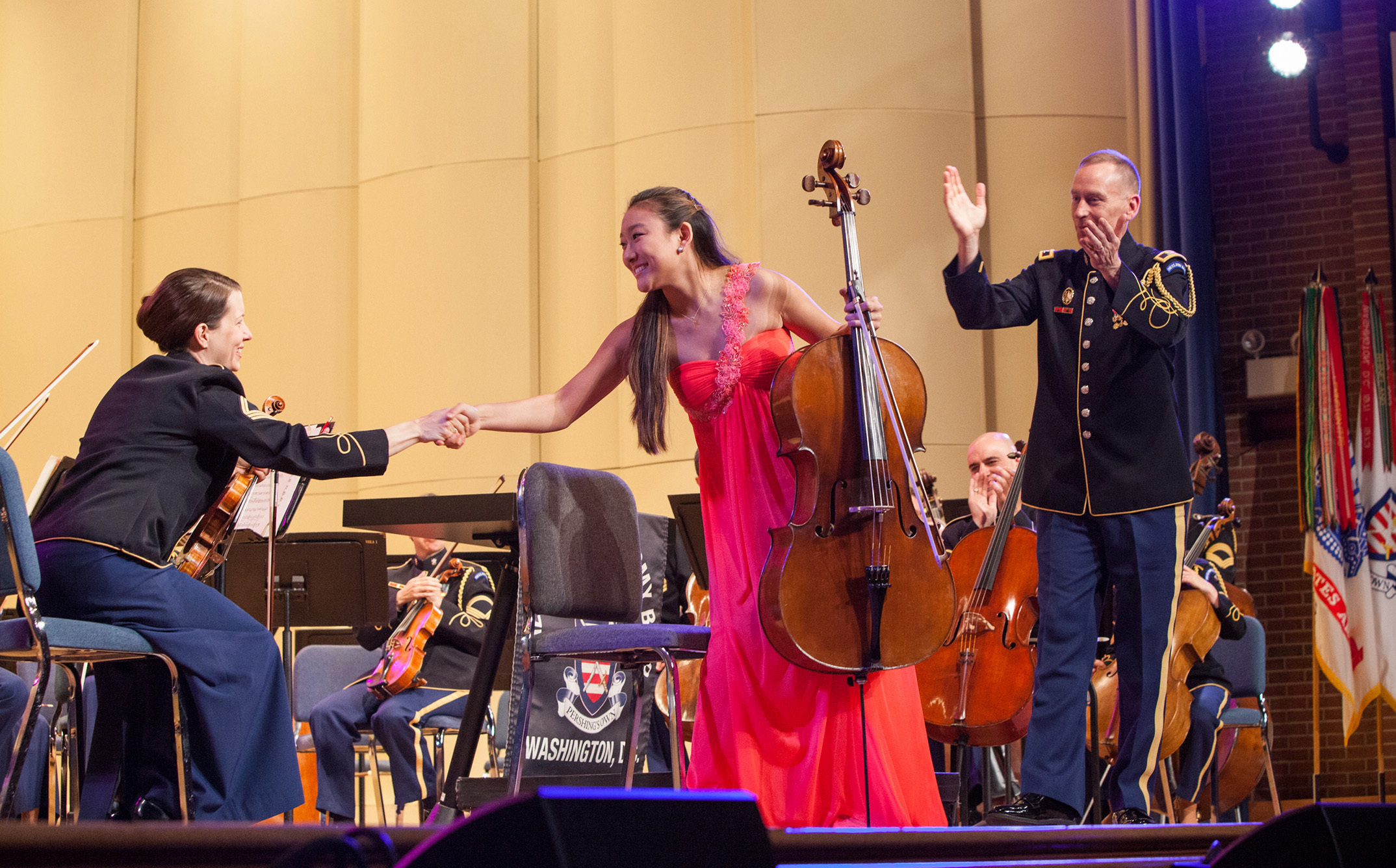
Guest cellist shakes hands with the concertmaster

The concertmaster (from the German Konzertmeister), first chair (US) or leader (UK) is the principal first violin player in an orchestra, or the principal clarinetist or oboist in a concert band. After the conductor, the concertmaster is the most significant leader in an orchestra, concert band or other musical ensemble.

== Orchestra ==
In an orchestra, the concertmaster is customarily the leader of the first violin section. There is another violin section, the second violins, led by the principal second violin. Any violin solo in an orchestral work is played by the concertmaster (except in the case of a violin concerto, in which case a guest soloist usually plays). It is usually required that the concertmaster be the most skilled musician in the section, experienced at learning music quickly, counting rests accurately and leading the rest of the string section by their playing and bow gestures.

The concertmaster sits to the conductor's left, closest to the audience, in what is called the "first chair," "first [music] stand" or outside of the US "first desk." The concertmaster makes decisions regarding bowing and other technical details of violin playing for the violins, and sometimes all of the string players. The concertmaster leads the orchestra in tuning before concerts and rehearsals, and other technical aspects of orchestra management. Leading the orchestral tuning is not a mere formality; if the concertmaster believes that a section is not adequately tuned, they will signal to the oboe player to play another "A." Several larger orchestras have one or more assistant concertmasters, who lead the orchestra in the concertmaster's absence.

The concertmaster, along with the conductor and section principals, will normally participate in the auditions of important musicians (e.g., principal players) in the orchestra.

== Other large ensembles ==
In a standard concert band, the concertmaster is the principal clarinet or oboe and leads the ensemble's tuning. The first-chair concertmaster will, in common practice, play all solos for their instrument. Often the lead flautist will receive similar responsibilities to the concertmaster, depending on several factors such as age, skill and time spent in the ensemble. The concertmaster will, in both orchestral and wind band settings, also coordinate with other principals and section leaders, in most cases being their senior in terms of group hierarchy.

In brass bands, the role of concertmaster is often filled by the principal solo cornet or trumpet.

== Duties ==
The duties and tasks of the concertmaster are many. Primarily, the concertmaster acts as the conduit between conductor and orchestra and is accountable to both parties.

One of the principal tasks of the concertmaster is to provide bowings for the first violins prior to rehearsal. This entails a great knowledge of historical playing styles in addition to complete idiomatic understanding of the mechanics of string playing. Section leaders among the other strings will base their bowings on those of the concertmaster and these section leaders (called principals) may confer during rehearsal in order to ensure unity and cohesion of execution between the string sections. Ensemble cohesion emanates directly from the contact and connection between these vital front desk positions. The concertmaster assumes responsibility for the tone and execution of the entire section of first violins, in addition to performing any solo passages that occur in a given piece.

Another primary duty of the concertmaster is to translate instructions from the conductor into specific technical language for the strings. Some conductors prefer to speak more broadly and defer to the concertmaster on such matters out of respect for the musicians who are expert specialists while the conductor is, often (unless they are a string player), a generalist.

Full-time professional orchestras work with several conductors through the course of a regular season. Accordingly, while the conductor may change week to week or month to month, the concertmaster lends a sense of stable and constant leadership day to day. While the impetus for the orchestra to play is given by the conductor's gestures, oftentimes for reasons of precision the orchestra will actually follow the bow of the concertmaster as their cue to play. This is because the conductor's gestures exist in the abstract whereas the concertmaster produces sound along with their fellow musicians. Further, the idiosyncratic technique of some conductors can make it difficult for the orchestra to enter together. Yet another duty of the concertmaster is to maintain a sense of decorum during rehearsals by setting a personal example and by monitoring the room to ensure all members of the orchestra are being cooperative. It is more appropriate for the concertmaster to ask for quiet if there is a bit of chatter than it is for a guest conductor unfamiliar with the orchestra.

In performances given in America and/or featuring American or British orchestras, the concertmaster will usually walk onstage individually after the rest of the orchestra is seated, and bow and receive applause before the conductor appears. In continental European orchestras, this practice is uncommon. There, the concertmaster usually walks onstage with the rest of the orchestra. As the representative of the orchestra, the concertmaster will usually shake hands with the conductor at the beginning or end of a concert as a sign of mutual respect and appreciation.

== See also ==
- String quartet
