= Georges Frey =

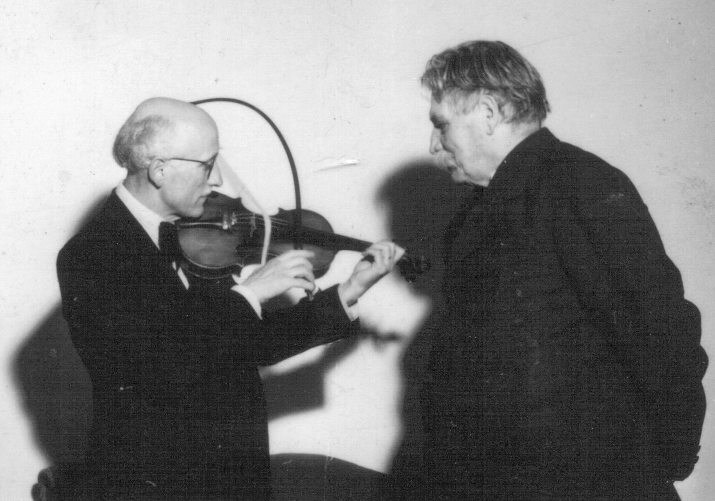
- Georges Frey demonstrating the curved bow to Albert Schweitzer

Background information
- Born: 2 August 1890; Mulhouse
- Died: 7 October 1975 (aged 85)
- Instruments: Violin, viola

Georges Frey (2 August 1890 – 7 October 1975) was a French violinist, viola player and specialist of the curved bow. He is the father of the pianist and organist Jean-Claude Frey.

== Biography ==
The early years of Georges Frey are known through his typescript entitled Réminiscences. Born in Mulhouse on 2 August 1890, he received his first violin lessons from a former student of Joseph Joachim. After earning his Baccalaureate in Latin and Greek he went to Paris to further his violin studies with Daniel Herrmann. He also had private lessons with Henri Berthelier, a disciple of Joseph Lambert Massart and professor at the Conservatoire de Paris. In early 1914 Georges Frey went to Berlin with a letter of recommendation from the Swiss composer Hans Huber to study with Henri Marteau at the Hochschule für Musik. Owing to political turmoil he had to return to Paris prematurely, where he arranged to have a few last lessons with Berthelier who was already showing physical as well as mental symptoms of his brain tumour.

In 1915 Georges Frey joined the ranks of the 30th Battalion, 3rd Company and was sent to the trenches. On 13 August 1916 he was shot and wounded by the German artillery. He survived thanks to the exceptional ability and care of Dr André, General Foch's personal surgeon, and after several months of convalescence was able to rejoin his battalion. At the end of the war Georges Frey became director of the Mulhouse Conservatoire (1919–39), establishing the famous 'Jeudis du Conservatoire', inviting leading musicians such as the mezzo-soprano Claire Croiza and the composer Albert Roussel (with whom he played the Violin Sonata No. 2 in A major, Op. 28).

In January 1933 Georges Frey received an invitation from Albert Schweitzer to go to Strasbourg to hear the violinist Rolph Schroeder play the Bach Sonatas and Partitas with a curved bow. Georges Frey went to the concert as «a great sceptic» but only eight days later he had his first curved bow in his hand, which was built after Schroeder's model. From that moment, Frey never ceased to actively promote the curved bow, giving numerous recitals in France and Switzerland. The bond of friendship which now united him to Schweitzer stimulated his reflection on the interpretation of the polyphonic works for violin as well as his inventiveness in creating new models of the curved bow. The outbreak of World War II put an end to this particularly fertile period of teaching and giving concerts: on 13 December 1940 the Frey family was expelled from Alsace, finding refuge in Aix-en Provence. The unemployment office of Vichy nevertheless procured Frey a job as a violinist for about thirty performances of Arthur Honegger's Jeanne au bûcher.

On his return to Mulhouse after the war, Frey was named co-director of the new School of Music, a post which he occupied until his retirement in 1955. He continued his career as a solo violinist and viola player until about 1962, giving recitals and concert conferences. His programmes included more and more of the Sonatas and Partitas of Bach which he always played with the curved bow, in line with the interpretative philosophy of Albert Schweitzer.

== Curved bows ==
According to Schweitzer, the first curved bow used by Frey was built in collaboration with a Swiss bow maker and was similar to Rolph Schroeder's. Other models followed and according to Alfred Koenig Frey improved Schroeder's bow, finding a mechanism that obviated the stiffening of the right hand and wrist while putting the bow hair in tension with the thumb. Georges Frey also possessed a Vega Bach Bow built by the Danish violin maker Knud Vestergaard.

== Sources ==
- Alberto Bachmann, An Encyclopedia of the Violin, tr. by F. H. Martens, New York, Appleton, 1925.
- Gustave Doret, Lettre à Georges Frey, 16.07.1942, archives of Jean-Claude Frey.
- Georges Frey, De l'archet courbe à l'archet droit, Royaumont, 1962, typescript, archives of Jean-Claude Frey.
- Georges Frey, Réminiscences, typescript, 1974 [76 pp.], archives of Jean-Claude Frey.
- Rudolf Gähler, Der Rundbogen für die Violine - ein Phantom?, Regensburg, ConBrio, 1997.
- Vincent d'Indy, Lettre à Georges Frey, 10.12.1924, archives of Jean-Claude Frey.
- Alfred Koenig, Lettre à Georges Frey, 18.02.1953, archives of Jean-Claude Frey.
- Alfred Koenig, Lettre à Georges Frey, 21.02.1953, archives of Jean-Claude Frey.
- Albert Schweitzer, Der runde Violinbogen, in: «Schweizerische Musikzeitung», Zürich, 15 mars 1933, 73. Jahrgang, Nr. 6, pp. 197–203.
- Albert Schweitzer, Lettre à Georges Frey, 10.01.1949, archives of Jean-Claude Frey.
- Albert Schweitzer, Les œuvres pour violon seul de Bach; de l'archet à utiliser pour leur exécution, in: «Saisons d'Alsace», n. 2, 1950, pp. 139–145.
- Knud Vestergaard, Facture à Georges Frey pour un Vega Bach Bow, June 1957, archives of Jean-Claude Frey.
- Knud Vestergaard, Lettre à Georges Frey, 01.08.1957, archives of Jean-Claude Frey.
- Raoul Vidas, How Berthelier, of the Paris Conservatoire, taught the violin, in: Frederick H. Martens, String Mastery. Talks With Master Violinists, Viola Players and Violoncellists, vol. II, New York, F. A. Stokes, 1923, pp. 184–191.
