= Pietro Capodieci =

Italian musician and violin maker

Pietro Capodieci (born 28 August 1933) is an Italian musician and violin maker based in Rome.

== Biography ==
Born in Rome to a musical family, Pietro Capodieci studied the trumpet with Reginaldo Caffarelli at the Conservatoire Santa Cecilia of Rome. He subsequently studied the double bass with Tito Bartoli, receiving advice and support from Giuseppe Selmi and Massimo Amfiteatrof. Pietro Capodieci had a first career as a recording artist at the historical Cinecittà studios, participating in movie soundtracks such as Fellini's “La dolce vita”, Bolognini's “Bad Girls Don't Cry”, Wyler's “Roman Holiday” and Cohn's “Seven Hills of Rome”. In 1971 he joined the orchestra of the Teatro dell'Opera in Rome as a member of the double bass section. In parallel with his career as a performer, Pietro Capodieci is a prolific builder of stringed musical instruments. His passion for violin making dates back from childhood when his father, the violinist Francesco Capodieci, took him to the workshop of Rodolfo Fredi. Having received his first tuition from the eminent violin maker, he subsequently mastered the complete process of violin making and varnishing.

== Special performing techniques ==
As a performer on the double bass and the cello, Pietro Capodieci has developed to an astonishing degree the technique of parlato playing. His unique ability to convey the sound of words and phrases with his bow (notably the famous Paganinian ‘buona sera’) has made him a household name in Italy.

== Instruments ==
Pietro Capodieci's production includes violins, violas, cellos and double basses. He uses woods of the highest quality, in particular the rare and sought-after “Birdseye Maple”.

== Sources ==
- Gualtiero Nicolini, Liutai italiani di ieri e di oggi, Cremona, Ed. Stradivari, 1982
- Tatiana Berford, Николо Паганини. Стилевые истоки творчества, San Pietroburgo, Novikoff, 2010, pp. 192, 193, 197
- Manuel De Sica, Di figlio in padre, Milano, Bompiani, 2013
