= Biagio Marini =

Italian composer

Biagio Marini (5 February 1594 – 20 March 1663) was an Italian virtuoso violinist and composer in the first half of the seventeenth century.

Marini was born in Brescia. He may have studied with his uncle Giacinto Bondioli. His works were printed and influential throughout the European musical world. He travelled throughout his life, and occupied posts in Brussels, over thirty years in Neuburg an der Donau and Düsseldorf, and Venice in 1615, joining Monteverdi's group at St. Mark's Cathedral, Padua, Parma, Ferrara, Milan, Bergamo, and Brescia in Italy. There is evidence that he married three times and fathered five children. He died in Venice.

Although he wrote both instrumental and vocal music, he is better known for his innovative instrumental compositions. He contributed to the early development of the string idiom by expanding the performance range of the solo and accompanied violin and incorporating slur, double and even triple stopping, and the first explicitly notated tremolo (in the sonata La Foscarina, op. 1 No. 14; 1617) effects into his music. He was also among the first composers, after Marco Uccellini, to call for scordatura tunings. He made contributions to most of the contemporary genres and investigated unusual compositional procedures, like constructing an entire sonata without a cadence (as in his Sonata senza cadenza). At least some, and perhaps a great deal, of his output is lost, but that which survives exhibits his inventiveness, lyrical skill, harmonic boldness, and growing tendency toward common practice tonality. In addition to his violin works, he wrote music for the cornett, dulcian, and sackbut.

One latter-day champion of Marini's music is the British violinist Andrew Manze, who has released a disc on the Harmonia Mundi label entitled Curiose e moderne inventioni devoted to Marini's music for strings.

== Surviving published works ==
- Op. 1 Affetti musicali (1617)
- Op. 2 Madrigali e symfonie (1618)
- Op. 3 Arie, madrigali et corenti (1620)
- Op. 5 Scherzi e canzonette
- Op. 6 Le lagrime d’Erminia in stile recitativo
- Op. 7 Per le musiche di camera concerti
- Op. 8 Sonate, symphonie…e retornelli (1629)
- Op. 9 Madrigaletti
- Op. 13 Compositioni varie per musica di camera
- Op. 15 Corona melodica
- Op. 16 Concerto terzo delle musiche da camera
- Op. 18 Salmi per tutte le solennità dell’anno concertati nel moderno stile
- Op. 20 Vesperi per tutte le festività dell’anno
- Op. 21 Lagrime di Davide sparse nel miserere
- Op. 22 Per ogni sorte di strumento musicale diversi generi di sonate, da chiesa, e da camera (1655)
- 2 motets

== Sources ==
- Dunn, Thomas D. "Marini, Biagio", Grove Music Online, ed. L. Macy (accessed 22 March 2006), grovemusic.com (subscription access).
- Brunner, Georg (1997). "Biagio Marini. Die Revolution in der Instrumentalmusik". Schrobenhausen: Verlag Benedikt Bickel. ISBN 3-922803-92-X.

== See also ==
- Extended technique
- Playing the violin
