= Curved bow =

Type of bow for stringed instruments

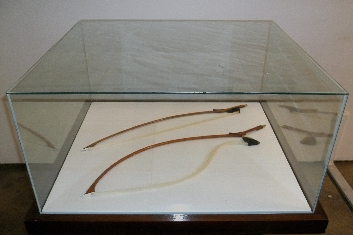
The BACH.Bow for Cello

The curved bow for string instruments enables string players to control the tension of the bow hair in order to play one, two, three and four strings simultaneously and to change easily among these possibilities. The high arch of the bow allows full, sustained chords to be played and there is a lever mechanism that affects the tension and release of the bow hair. The stick of the curved bow is bent upwards (convex) and forms a circle segment. Since the four strings of a string instrument are arranged on a curved bridge, the bow hairs must be loosened so that they can reach all three or four strings (Fig. 1). Currently used bow sticks are slightly bent in the other direction (concave), that is it is only possible to play two strings at a time and, for a short time with a lot of bow pressure, three strings simultaneously (Fig. 2).

== History ==
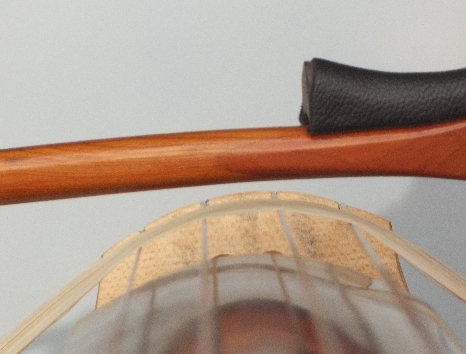
Curved Bow on four strings (Fig. 1)

The practice of polyphonic playing is documented by Alessandro Striggio (1540–92), violinist Nicolaus Bruhns (1665–97), and German violinist Johann Paul von Westhoff (1656–1705), who also developed a unique notation for that. There exist also some polyphonic pieces for violin and viola by Niccolò Paganini (1782–1840), documented by Dr. Philippe Borer.

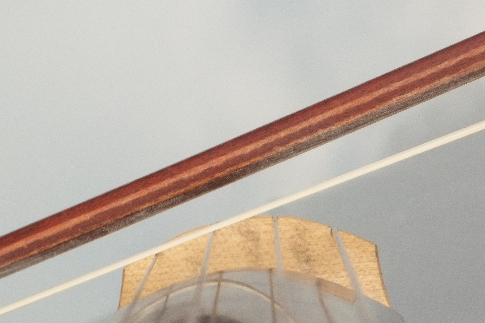
Cello Bow on two strings (Fig. 2)

Ever since the publication in 1905 of Albert Schweitzer's book about J. S. Bach, the question of the curved bow has been widely debated. For Schweitzer, however, the use of the curved bow was essential in performing Bach’s compositions for solo violin and cello. Asked to write an article in the Bach year in 1950 (Bach-Gedenkschrift), forty-five years after his book on J. S. Bach, Schweitzer still focused on his ideas about the curved bow.

David Dodge Boyden and other musicologists provided compelling arguments against the authenticity of the "Bach bow". According to them, historic indications as to a strongly curved bow in the 18th century are missing. There are images of strongly curved bows from mediaeval times, but these have taut hair. Two texts, on the other hand, document use of the curved bow in modern times, mainly as a means to better analyze polyphonic baroque music: Rudolf Gaehler's book Der Rundbogen für die Violine – ein Phantom? (The Curved Bow for the Violin – a Phantom?), and Michael Bach’s article on the Suites for Cello of J. S. Bach. The blog the bach update presents texts and harmonic analyzes of the works for solo violin and cello by Bach which come to the conclusion that the use of an appropriate bow is necessary.

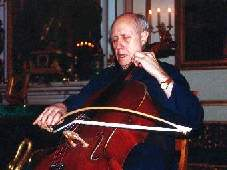
Mstislav Rostropovich with BACH.Bow in 1999

The curved bow for violin was firstly constructed by Rolph Schroeder, Kassel, Germany in 1932. Later the Hungarian violinist Emil Telmányi and Knud Vestergaard, a Danish violin- and bowmaker invented a different model for performing Sonatas and Partitas for violin solo by Johann Sebastian Bach.
The violinist Tossy Spivakovsky used a curved bow from Knud Vestergaard with which he performed the Bach Sonatas and Partitas for unaccompanied violin. His article entitled "Polyphony in Bach's Works for Solo Violin," published in 1967 in the Music Review, Vol. 28, No. 4, provides evidence that Bach wanted certain chords in his solo violin suites played without arpeggiation. In 1990, German cellist Michael Bach developed a curved bow for cello, violin, viola and bass. Rudolf Gaehler recorded in 1998 all Sonatas and Partitas for violin solo by Johann Sebastian Bach using a curved bow.

== Curved bow players ==
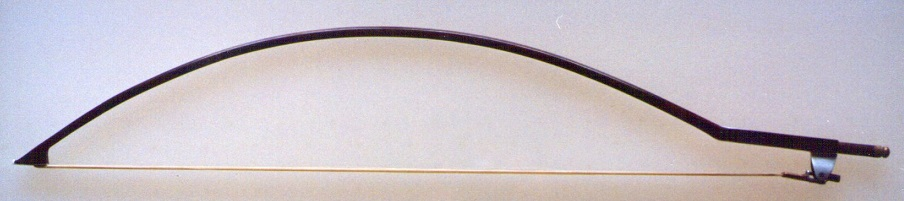
Curved bow of Rolph Schroeder

Musicians who have been identified as playing instruments using a curved bow include Herman Berkowski, Rolph Schroeder (1900–1980), Emil Telmányi (1892–1988), Georges Frey (1890–1975), Roman Totenberg (1911–2012), Otto Büchner (1924–2008), Tossy Spivakovsky (1906–1998), Rudolf Gaehler (b. 1941), Hartmut Lindemann, Reinhold Dolin (1938–2006), Klaus der Geiger (b. 1940), Michael Bach (b. 1958), Mstislav Rostropovitch (1927–2007), Philippe Borer, Burkard Weber (b. 1969), Noah Sorota, Hitoshi Ando, Alexander Waterman (b. 1975), Monica Germino, Nikos Veliotis (b. 1970), Sue Schlotte (b. 1967), Gustav Rivinius (b. 1965), Anton Lukoszevieze (b. 1965), Carlos Zingaro (b. 1948), Ernesto Rodrigues (b. 1959), Guilherme Rodrigues (b. 1988), Bill Robinson (b. 1955), Ted Mook (b. 1953), 12 Cellisten Tübingen, Torsten Harder (b. 1965), Oliver Coates, Brice Catherin (b. 1981), Tomoki Tai, Nora Krahl, Marei Seuthe, Tanja Orning, Dorsten Klauke, Jennifer Bewerse, Andrew Phillips, Maresuke Okamoto, Sonja Schebeck, Maya Fridman, Vid Veljak, Sam Sweeney (b. 1989), Sara Cubarsi, Kyle Armbrust, Killick Erik Hinds, Kei Yamazawa, Jaron Lanier (1960).

== Compositions for the curved bow ==
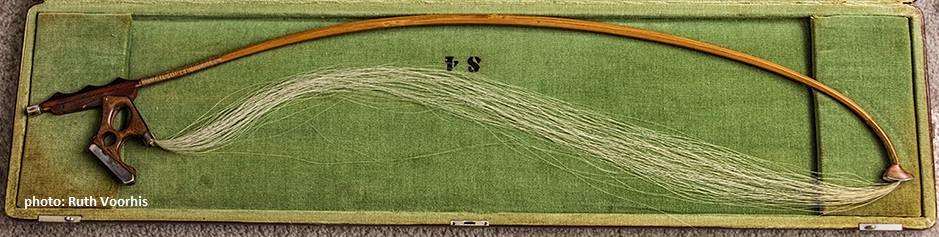
VEGA BACH BOW of Tossy Spivakovsky

Composers who have written works intended to be played with a curved bow include Bernd Alois Zimmermann, Dieter Schnebel, Walter Zimmermann, John Cage, Michael Bach Bachtischa, Gerhard Stäbler, Hans Zender, Burkard Weber, Yoshifumi Tanaka, Daniel Ott, Marei Seuthe, Brice Catherin, Ludovic Thirvaudey, Roland Moser, Catherine Kontz, Arash Yazdani, Haris Kittos, Reyaldo Young, Dimitris Kamarotos, Michalis Adamis, Daryl Runswick, Dai Fujikura, Rupert Huber.
