= Michael Bach (musician) =

German artist, composer and cellist

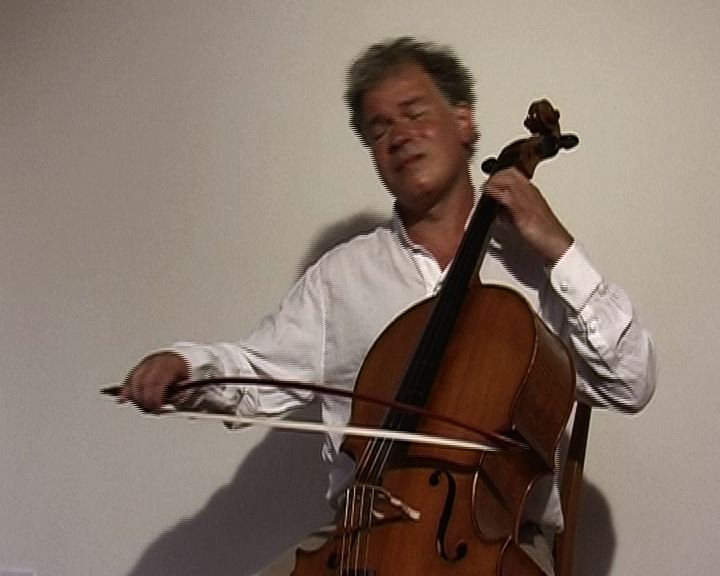
Michael Bach, Cello with BACH.Bow

Michael Bach (born 17 April 1958 in Worms, Germany), also known as Michael Bach Bachtischa, is a German cellist, composer, and visual artist.

== Biography ==
He studied cello with Gerhard Mantel, Boris Pergamenschikow, Pierre Fournier, and János Starker, then embarked on a career of international concert activity as well as performances on radio, recordings, and television.

He made numerous significant contributions to the art of contemporary cello performance; his publication Fingerboards & Overtones proposes new ideas concerning overtones and harmonics and is considered a pioneering work in the literature on contemporary technique. In 1990, he developed the curved bow (BACH.Bogen) for the cello, violin, viola and bass, which, in polyphonic playing, permits the simultaneous sounding of multiple strings, with the high arch of the bow allowing for full, sustained chords. During the years 1997 to 2001, Mstislav Rostropovich has been intimately involved in its development. In 2001, he invited Michael Bach to Paris for a presentation of his BACH.Bow (7th Concours de violoncelle Rostropovitch).

In 2012, during an exhibition on the theme BACHLAEUFE – The Imprint of Johann Sebastian Bach on Modern Times, held at Arnstadt, Germany, the first prize was awarded to the BACH.Bow. His work as cellist and composer was awarded the Gaudeamus Prize Amsterdam, the Kranichstein Prize Darmstadt, the Japan Record Academy Prize, the Millennium Prize Würzburg.

Several contemporary composers, among them John Cage, Dieter Schnebel, Walter Zimmermann and Hans Zender, have composed works especially for the BACH.Bow. Bach Bachtischa is also a composer. His purely musical compositions are idiosyncratic and highly personal, described by him as “free from compositional conventions.”

In collaboration with the visual artist Renate Hoffleit he has created strikingly original string installations. Their projects (zwischen e and f)² in Stuttgart and IM KLANGSTROM in Ulm, Germany were supported i. a. by the Innovationsfonds Kunst of the State of Baden-Württemberg. The project Schloss Kapfenburg besaitet... was listed in the Guinness Book of Records in 2000.

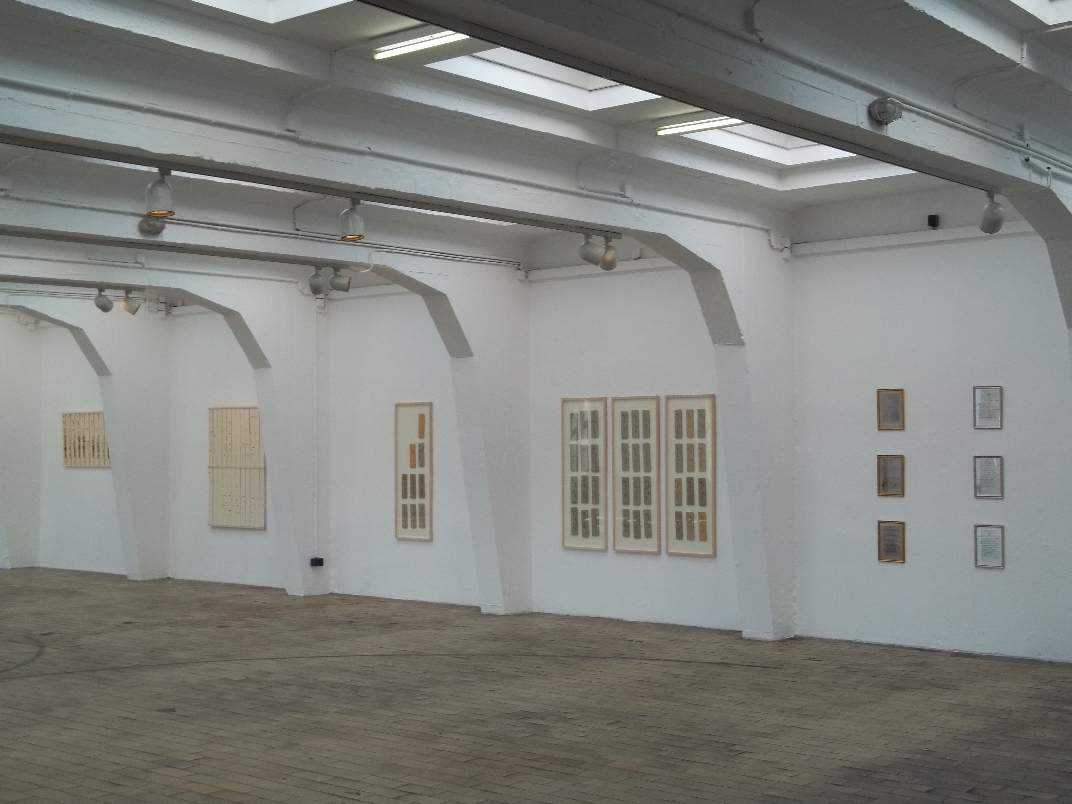
Exhibition of the Fingerboards in Trier, Germany 2012

In the two blogs the bach update and the cello upgrade, Michael Bach documents and analyzes projects and aspects of contemporary music as well as new insights into the solo works for violin and cello by Johann Sebastian Bach.

Michael Bach's visual works include Fingerboards (1990–2010), which capture the hand's choreography on the cello fingerboard as color impressions, Fieldwork (1994), Mit diesen beiden Händen (1994), Lagauche (1995), and Olévano (1995–).

The German postage stamp 75 Jahre Donaueschinger Musiktage, Deutschland 1996 shows his composition and drawing 18–7–92, Scetches to Ryoanji (1992).

== Compositions ==
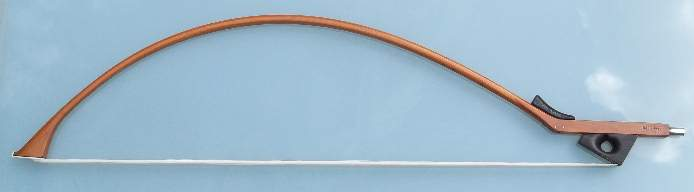
BACH.Bow

- Ohne Titel (1992) for cello and 3 tapes, first performance: Donaueschinger Musiktage, Germany 1994
- Notation 2 for 15 STRINGS and 5 Players (1992), first performance: Donaueschinger Musiktage, Germany 1994
- Notation 1 and 2 for Voice (1993–94), first performance: Stuttgart, Germany 1994
- 55 Sounds (1995) for cello with curved bow, first performance: Schloss Monrepos, Ludwigsburg, Germany 1995
- 50 Sounds (1995) for accordion, first performance: ZKM Karlsruhe, Germany 2010
- +Murbach (2000) für cello, first performance: Printemps Rhénan, SWR, France 2000
- A–E–G–C (2000) for microtonal piano, first performance: Internationale Musikakademie Schloss Kapfenburg, Germany 2000
- Karpfens'bug (2000) for string players and singers, first performance: Internationale Musikakademie Schloss Kapfenburg, Germany 2000
- Karpfens'teich (2000) for wind instruments, first performance: Internationale Musikakademie Schloss Kapfenburg, Germany 2000
- NURHAUFFÜGUR 1-7 for cello with curved bow and live-electronics, first performance: Donaueschinger Musiktage, Germany 2000
- 57 Sounds (2001) for organ, first performance: Rheinischer Frühling, SWR, Worms, Germany 2001
- Notation for Chamber Orchestra (2001), first performance: Rheinischer Frühling, SWR, Worms, Germany 2001
- 5 Pitches, 13 Notes (2005) for cello with curved bow, first performance: MANCA Festival Nice, France 2005
- 18–7–92 (1992/2004) for cello with curved bow and 3 tapes, first performance: Other Minds Festival, San Francisco, USA 2008
- namen.los (2008) for clarinet, first performance: Treffpunkt Rotebühl, Stuttgart, Germany 2008
- ONE13 (1992/2006) for cello with curved bow and pre-recorded media (Co-Author: John Cage), first performance: Other Minds Festival, San Francisco, USA 2008
- versbrechen – ein Fingerboard für Kirchner (2010) for cello with curved bow, first performance: Galerie Stihl, Waiblingen, Germany 2010
- locus amoenus (2014) for cello with curved bow, first performance: Foundation Domnick, Nürtingen 2014
- vierumuns (2015) for four voices, first performance: (EXVOCO) City Library of Stuttgart 2015
- 273" für Dieter Schnebel (2018) for cello with curved bow, first performance: Kunstbezirk Stuttgart, Allemagne 2018
- Interludien (2018) for cello with curved bow, first performance: Ulmer Münster, 2018
- KLANGPARALLELEN (2022) for cello with curved bow, first performance: Stuttgart, 2022

== Premieres ==
- 1986 SOLO (1966) by Karlheinz Stockhausen with digital delay machines. Michael Bach, Cello and the Experimentalstudio des SWF, Hans Peter Haller, Freiburg, Germany.
- 1986 Sonata in E-flat Major, opus 64 by Ludwig van Beethoven with Berhard Wambach, piano, Karlsruhe, Germany.
- 1987 Kadenzen (1913) by Arnold Schoenberg for the Cello Concerto in g minor by Matthias Georg Monn with the Orchester der Beethovenhalle Bonn, conductor: Georg Schmöhe, Bonn, Germany.
- 1991 ONE8 and 108 (1991) for cello with curved bow and orchestra by John Cage, dedicated to Michael Bach and the Radio Symphony Orchestra Stuttgart (without conductor), Stuttgart, Germany.
- 1992 Mit diesen Händen (1992) for cello with curved bow and voice by Dieter Schnebel, dedicated to Michael Bach, together with the singer William Pearson on the occasion of the "Heinrich-Böll-Woche" in Cologne, Germany.
- 1993 ONE13 (1992) for cello with curved bow and 3 tapes, composition by John Cage and Michael Bach Bachtischa, festival musica in Strasbourg, France.
- 1998 TIERKREIS by Karlheinz Stockhausen, version for cello with curved bow by Michael Bach Bachtischa in Bayreuth, Germany.
- 2004 Capriccio 1828 for violin solo by Niccolò Paganini, version for cello with curved bow by Michael Bach Bachtischa in Worms, Germany.
- 2008 New version of ONE13 (1992/2006) for cello with curved bow and 3 tapes, composition by John Cage and Michael Bach Bachtischa, in San Francisco, USA and Stuttgart, Germany.
- 2010 versbrechen – ein Fingerboard für Kirchner for cello with curved bow by Michael Bach Bachtischa, Galerie Stihl Waiblingen, Germany.
- 2014 locus amoenus for cello with curved bow, by Michael Bach Bachtischa, Foundation Domnick, Nürtingen
- 2015 vierumuns for four voices, by Michael Bach Bachtischa, EXVOCO Stuttgart, City Library of Stuttgart
- 2018 273" für Dieter Schnebel for cello with curved bow, by Michael Bach Bachtischa, Kunstbezirk Stuttgart
- 2018 Interludien for cello with curved bow, Ulmer Münster, within the project IM KLANGSTROM with Renate Hoffleit
- 2022 KLANGPARALLELEN for cello with curved bow, Stuttgart, on the occasion of the exhibition 30 Years SKULPTURENFELD by Renate Hoffleit

== Publications ==
- Michael Bach, Fingerboards & Overtones, Pictures, Basics and Model for a New Way of Cello Playing, German and English, edition spangenberg, München, Germany 1991, ISBN 3-89409-063-4
- Michael Bach, Die Suiten für Violoncello von Johann Sebastian Bach, in Das Orchester 7-8/1997, Mainz, Germany
- Rudolf Gähler: Der Rundbogen für die Violine – ein Phantom?, ConBrio-Fachbuch, Band 5, ConBrio Verlagsgesellschaft Regensburg, Germany 1997, ISBN 3-930079-58-5
- MUSICAGE, pages 246–290 and 296, Editor: Joan Retallack, Wesleyan University Press, Hanover, USA 1996, ISBN 0-8195-5285-2
- Baker's Biographical Dictionary of Musicians, Centennial Edition, Vol. 1, pages 173/174, Editors: Nicolas Slonimsky and Laura Kuhn, New York, USA 2001
- Jeremy Barlow: The Bach Bow, in: Early music today, London, Great Britain 2003
- Daniel Charles, Musiques premières, Festival Manca, Nice 2005
- Daniel Charles, au-delà du 'Coup de dés', Zeppelin 2008

== Radio and TV ==
- "The Cellist Michael Bach", Moderation: Sabine Fallenstein, 60 minutes, SWR Baden-Baden, Germany 1998
- "The BACH.Bogen", Moderation: Sabine Fallenstein, 10 minutes, SWR Baden-Baden, Germany 2000
- Interview with Michael Bach concerning the „BACH.Bogen", Moderation: Andreas Lindahl, 20 minutes, Sveriges Radio, Sweden 2007
- "Daimei No Nei Ongakukai", Moderation: Toshiro Mayuzumi, Michael Bach and the Tokyo City Philharmonic, Naozumi Yamamoto, Shibuya Public Hall, TV Asahi Tokyo, Japan 1990
- Donaueschinger Musiktage 1994, Concert on 14 October 1994, SWR TV Baden-Baden, Germany 1994
- Radio broadcast on SWR 2, Klassik extra with Michael Bach, 31 December 2016
