= Emil Telmányi =

Hungarian violinist

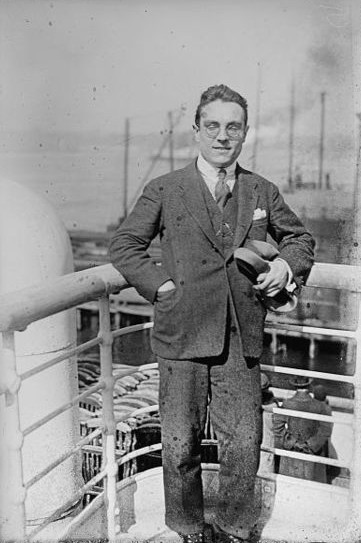
Emil Telmányi

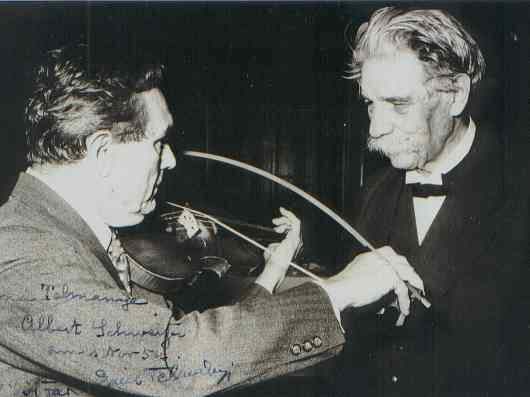
Emil Telmányi demonstrates to Albert Schweitzer his curved bow ("Vega" Bach Bow) in 1954

Emil Telmányi (22 June 1892 – 13 June 1988) was a Hungarian violinist.

Telmányi was born in Arad, Partium, Transylvania, then in the Kingdom of Hungary.

Telmányi began playing the violin at the age of six and made his public debut at thirteen. His evident talent earned him entry into the soloist classes at the Budapest Academy of Music under the tutelage of the renowned Jenö Hubay. Additionally, he studied composition with Hans Koessler and received conducting instruction. In 1906, he won the Reményi Prize and graduated in 1911 from the academy with both artistic and teaching diplomas, also completing his high school exams the same year. His artistic career began in 1911 with a debut in Berlin, where he performed Sir Edward Elgar's newly composed Violin Concerto for the first time in Germany. It was attended by the pianist Ignaz Friedman, who befriended him and arranged some of his early concerts in Copenhagen, where he later settled. He became an exponent of the composer Carl Nielsen, having recorded some of his violin sonatas and his violin concerto.

Based in Berlin, Telmányi began extensive international tours in 1912 with pianist Ignaz Friedman, becoming a highly respected soloist. That same year, he was warmly received in Copenhagen, where he became acquainted with Carl Nielsen and his compositions. Except for a brief period of conscription during World War I, Telmányi continued his concert tours, returning frequently to Copenhagen. In 1918, he married Carl Nielsen's youngest daughter, painter Anne Marie, and settled in Budapest. After the war, they moved permanently to Copenhagen, from where Telmányi continued his travels, performing across Europe and the USA, and returning annually to Hungary. On these journeys, he became a distinguished ambassador for Danish music, particularly Nielsen's works, and continued his artistic career until the age of 75, notably performing in the Telmányi Quintet with his second wife, violinist and pianist Annette, and their three daughters. From 1919, Telmányi also worked as a conductor, in Copenhagen (with The Young Musicians' Society Orchestra, his chamber orchestra, and the Royal Danish Theatre, where he adapted Carl Nielsen’s Aladdin music for Elna Jørgen Jensen's (Elna Ørnberg) ballet Asra in 1932), and during the 1920s in Budapest, Gothenburg, and other locations. Even as of 1982, he conducted the Centerskolen Orchestra in Holte. Despite his extensive travels, he remained a significant figure in Danish musical life. Telmányi's passionate artistic temperament, combined with a noble sense of musical grandeur, has provided a strong impetus to Danish music, further enhanced by his pedagogical work privately and from 1940 to 1969 as a teacher at the Royal Academy of Music in Aarhus. His lifelong interest in Johann Sebastian Bach’s violin works and their performance challenges led to the creation of a special "Bach bow" (developed with Arne Hjorth in 1949 and Knud Vestergaard in 1953), which allows for enhanced polyphonic emphasis, particularly in Bach's solo violin partitas and sonatas. Telmányi recorded numerous records, including works by Carl Nielsen, F. Mendelssohn, and J. Sibelius, and particularly notable are his recordings of chamber music by Nielsen and Brahms, as well as Bach's solo works using Vestergaard’s "Vega Bach bow." In 1978, he published his memoirs, From a Musician’s Picture Book, offering valuable insights into musical figures such as Carl Nielsen, Zoltán Kodály, Béla Bartók, Ferruccio Busoni, Arnold Schoenberg, among others, and in 1982, he released a guide to studying and interpreting Carl Nielsen’s violin works and string quintet.

One of his most famous recordings is a 1954 recording of Bach's Sonatas and partitas for solo violin played using a violin with what was referred to as the "Vega" Bach Bow (recorded in November 1953 and March 1954, DANA CORD, DACO 147), which could be adjusted so the player could play three or even all four strings of the violin at once. He died, aged 95, in Holte, Denmark.
