= Valerie Bobbett Gardner =

American musician

Valerie Bobbett Gardner (born December 14, 1947) is an American violinist, pedagogue, and author.

== Birth and early years ==
Valerie Jeanne Bobbett was born on December 14, 1947, to parents Dr. Gordon Howard and Oreon Cameron Bobbett in Boston, Massachusetts. She was raised in Florence, South Carolina, in a musical household, her mother being a violinist and her father a clarinetist. Valerie began studying violin at age 8. At age 11, she received lessons from Peter Kurtz, a violinist who had taught Oreon Cameron 35 years earlier and who was visiting Florence upon the request of the Bobbett family. Valerie began teaching violin lessons at age 15. Valerie served as concertmaster of the South Carolina All-State Orchestras throughout her Junior and Senior High School years. Her summers were spent at the Brevard Music Center and at the Meadowmount School of Music as a student of Ivan Galamian. She also studied with Jerrie Lucktenberg and Elaine Richey during this time.

== Training and career ==
She obtained a Bachelor of Music degree in 1970 from the Curtis Institute of Music under Jascha Brodsky and a Masters of Fine Arts one year later from Carnegie-Mellon University under Sidney Harth.

On August 27, 1970, she married Warren Ewing Gardner.

From 1971 to 1973, she was a member of the Atlanta Symphony Orchestra.

In 2009, Gardner was the professor of violin and viola at North Georgia College and State University while continuing to maintain her private teaching studio in Winder, Georgia.
