= Jean-Pierre Maurin =

French violinist and pedagogue (1822 - 1894)

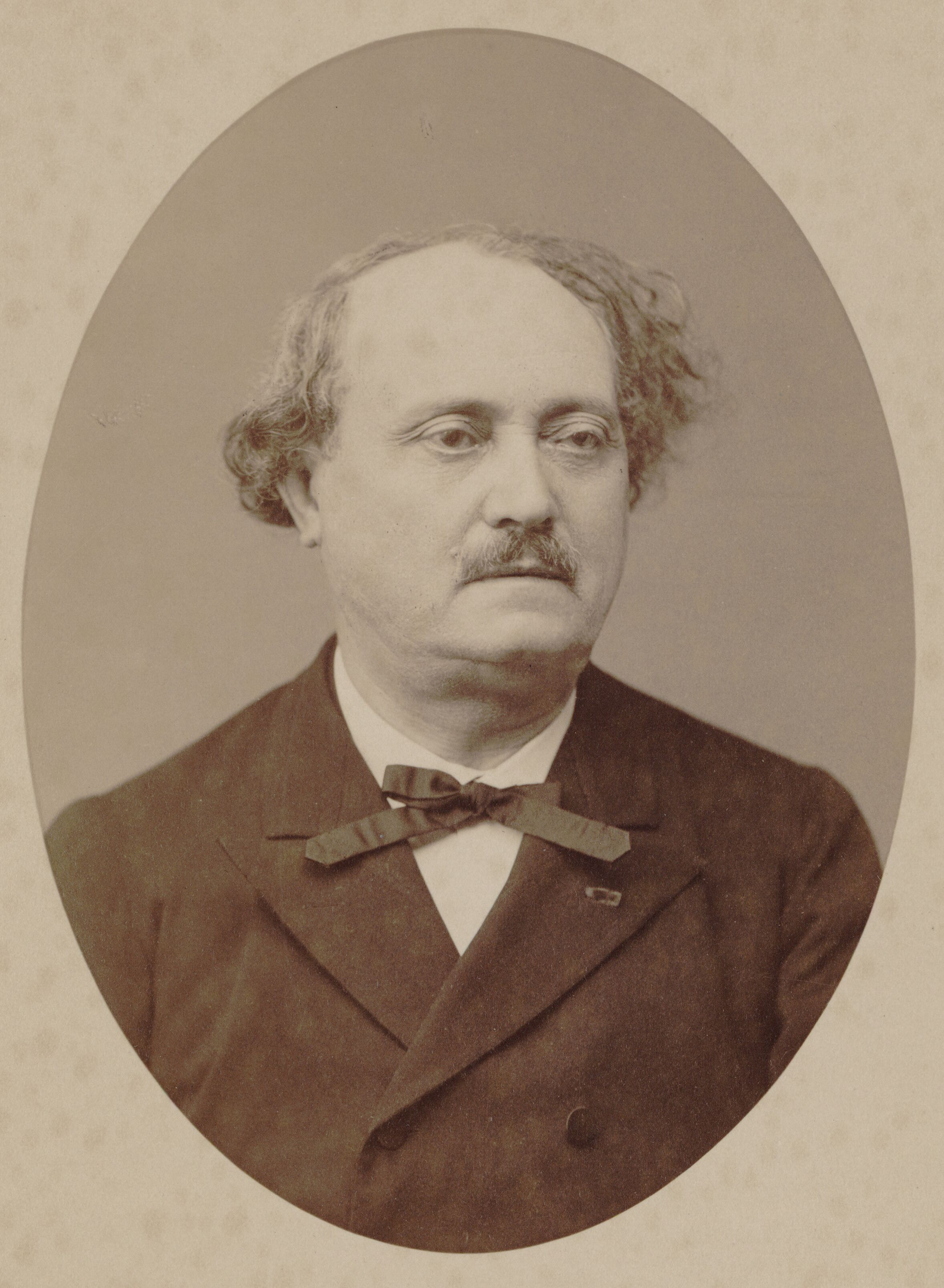

Jean-Pierre Maurin (14 February 1822 – 16 March 1894) was a French violinist and pedagogue.

== Career ==
Maurin was a student of Baillot and Habeneck at the Conservatoire de Paris. In 1875 he succeeded to the post of Jean-Delphin Alard as a professor of violin at the same institution. Contemporary sources attest to the significance of his performance activities:

...the cofounder of the Society for the Last Quartets of Beethoven... [he] and his string quartet contributed significantly to the growing understanding in Paris of Beethoven's late works. Richard Wagner, a severe critic, heard the Maurin Quartet in 1861 in Paris and described the performance as "most perfect."

The most famous of his pupils was Lucien Capet, who was to become the leader of the Capet Quartet and the teacher of Ivan Galamian.
