= Irène Joachim =

French soprano and vocal teacher

Irène Joachim (13 March 1913 - 20 April 2001) was a French soprano, and later a vocal teacher.

== Early life ==
Daughter of German officer Herman Joachim and French violinist Suzanne Chaigneau, and granddaughter of the violinist Joseph Joachim, she learnt violin and piano as a child. She was bilingual in German and French.

Just before the outbreak of the First World War she and her parents left Paris for Berlin, staying in a pension in the Lutherstrasse for the remainder of the war. Her father died of tuberculosis in 1917, and due to the hardships of life in the German capital Joachim was sent back to France in the autumn of 1918, living with an aunt before her mother returned in 1920.

Due to health problems and her mother's professional life-style, Joachim was educated privately, firstly by Jeanne Favart. Afternoons were devoted to music studies : violin, piano and solfège.

As a child she heard musicians such as Emanuel Feuermann, Claire Croiza, Germaine Lubin, Marya Freund and the Capet Quartet. Through the social circle of Jean Gehret the 12-year-old Joachim went to plays and attended the last seasons of the Diaghilev Ballet. During the summer of 1926 and for several months in 1927 Irène accompanied her mother who undertook two visits as a teacher with the Yanker family in Chicago. This again brought the young Joachim into close contact with leading musicians, such as Thibaud, Tansman, Casals and Ravel. Back in France she stopped her violin studies but continued with the piano.

She married firstly Roger Weber on 29 July 1929 and on 3 July 1930 her son Alain was born. However, she divorced Weber soon after, and suffered a period of depression and uncertainty about the direction of her life. She married secondly Jean Gehret and thirdly Jean-Louis Lévi Alvarès (great-grandson of David Lévi Alvarès) film producer, in November 1955.

At the instigation of Jean Gehret, in 1933 Joachim began singing lessons, with Germaine Chevalet; her progress was such that she entered the competition to enrol at the Conservatoire de Paris, joining the class of Suzanne Cesbron-Viseur in October 1935, later studying with Georges Viseur (solfège) and Pierre Chéreau. During her Conservatoire years Joachim supported herself by singing in choirs, and also sang at the Concerts du Societe du Conservatoire.

== Career ==
In her final months at the Conservatoire in 1938 Joachim made her first audio recordings, of lieder by Brahms and Mozart. She would follow these during the Second World War with not only the first complete recording of Pelléas et Mélisande, but vocal music by Yves Nat and excerpts from Les Indes galantes.

Joachim made her debut at the Opéra-Comique on 2 February 1939 as Nanthilde in Le Bon Roi Dagobert by Samuel-Rousseau. She then sang Micaëla, Hélène (Une éducation manquée), Marguerite (Fragonard), the Countess (The Marriage of Figaro), Mélisande (Pelléas et Mélisande), the wife (Le pauvre matelot), Rosenn (Le roi d'Ys) and Sophie (Werther). She also created Léda (Amphytrion 38), Ginèvra (Ginèvra), Isabelle (Guignol), Madeleine (Marion) and Azénor (Le Rossignol de Saint-Malo). At the German invasion in 1940, along with many other Parisians she fled the city, but returned to the capital after the armistice.

Joachim is particularly remembered for her interpretation of Mélisande in Pelléas et Mélisande which she first sang at the Opéra-Comique on 12 September 1940, reprising it in France and abroad up to 1952; she recorded the role in April and May 1941 under Roger Désormière. She had studied Mélisande with Georges Viseur, who had worked alongside André Messager during the opera's premiere run, and she also had several meetings in Paris with Mary Garden, who created Mélisande and who particularly helped Joachim with stage deportment for the role. Her first performance alongside Jacques Jansen as Pelléas took place at the Opéra-Comique on 20 April 1941. Joachim's fame in Pelléas et Mélisande brought about an invitation from the Propagandastaffel to sing in Berlin, which she refused. During the war years, especially from 1942 she joined other artists in the Front National; her home was used for passing messages among the group.

She sang Rozenn (Le roi d'Ys) at both the Salle Favart and the Salle Garnier, as well as Mélisande in Ariane et Barbe-bleue at the Opéra. While her operatic career continued, the post-war years saw Joachim develop a fruitful relationship in recital with Jane Bathori; later in the 1950s, with other accompanists she made several broadcasts for French radio. She participated in the premiere of Le Soleil des eaux by Pierre Boulez as well as of works by Henri Dutilleux, Wiener and Nigg. She was renowned for her impeccable diction.

Irène Joachim also sang German lieder such as Schubert, Schumann, Berg: she won a 'Grand Prix du Disque' in 1959 for her recording of lieder by Carl Maria von Weber. In 1956 Joachim's contract at the Opera-Comique concluded, but she went on to be active in broadcasting and recitals.

From 1954 to 1962 Joachim taught singing at the Schola Cantorum; from 1963 she was a professor at the Paris Conservatoire.

== Recordings ==
As well as the classic recording of Pelléas et Mélisande, Joachim's commercial discography includes excerpts from Ginèvra by Delannoy (title role), lieder by Berg (Grand Prix du Disque 1950), Brahms, Schumann, and Weber (Grand Prix du Disque 1959) with Hélène Boschi at the piano, art songs by Debussy (Grand Prix du Disque 1949), Gounod and Nat, as well as anthologies of songs by Les Six, and traditional French and German songs. Radio broadcasts covered another Opéra-Comique performance of Pelléas et Mélisande with Jansen, conducted by Jean Fournet (12 February 1955), plus many songs and recitals, particularly of 20th century repertoire.

== Filmography ==
Joachim's first films date from her time at the Conservatoire; she took part in Jean Renoir's Les bas fonds (the voice of a cabaret singer) in 1936, and in La Marseillaise in 1937 (Madame de Saint-Laurent, singing and accompanying herself). She appeared and sang in the 1943 film Les anges du péché (Robert Bresson), and in 1951 La dernière étape by Wanda Jakubowska. In 1946 she became one of the first people to sing 'Feuilles mortes' by Kosma, with Yves Montand, in Les Portes de la nuit by Marcel Carné.
