= Michael Rabin =

American violinist (1936–1972)

Michael Rabin (/ˈreɪbɪn/ RAY-bin; May 2, 1936 – January 19, 1972) was an American violinist. He has been described as "one of the most talented and tragic violin virtuosi of his generation".

== Biography ==
Michael Rabin was of Romanian-Jewish descent. His mother Jeanne was a Juilliard-trained pianist, and his father George was a violinist in the New York Philharmonic. He began to study the violin at the age of seven. His parents encouraged his musical development. After a lesson with Jascha Heifetz, the master advised him to study with Ivan Galamian, who said he had "no weaknesses, never." He began studies with Galamian in New York and at the Meadowmount School of Music and the Juilliard School. His Carnegie Hall debut took place in January 1950, at the age of 13, as soloist with the National Orchestral Association, playing Vieuxtemps' Concerto No. 5 under the direction of Léon Barzin. Subsequently, he appeared with a number of American orchestras before his Carnegie Hall debut on 29 November 1951, at the age of 15, in the Paganini D major Concerto, with Dimitri Mitropoulos conducting the New York Philharmonic. His 1958 recording of this concerto is considered by many to be the most impressive recording of this work, and the recording itself is notable for the fullness of tone.

His first London appearance took place on 13 December 1954, at age 18, playing the Tchaikovsky Concerto in D at the Royal Albert Hall with the BBC Symphony Orchestra.

Rabin recorded concertos by Mendelssohn, Glazunov, Paganini (No. 1 in D major; 2 recordings), Wieniawski (No. 1 in F-sharp minor, No. 2 in D minor) and Tchaikovsky, as well as Bruch's Scottish Fantasy and the Paganini Caprices for solo violin. He recorded the Bach Sonata No. 3 in C major for solo violin, and the Third and Fourth sonatas for solo violin by Eugène Ysaÿe, as well as other virtuoso pieces, including an album with the Hollywood Bowl Orchestra.

Rabin played in a bel canto style. For many years, he played the "Kubelik" Guarnerius del Gesù of 1735. He toured widely, playing in all major cities in the U.S., Europe, South America, Southern Africa, and Australia. He even appeared on a 1951 episode of the variety television series "Texaco Star Theatre."

During a recital in Carnegie Hall, he suddenly lost his balance and fell forward. This was an early sign of a neurological condition which was to limit his career from then on. His death, at 35, resulted from a fall in his apartment in New York City.
