= Charles Treger =

American violinist and teacher (1935–2023)

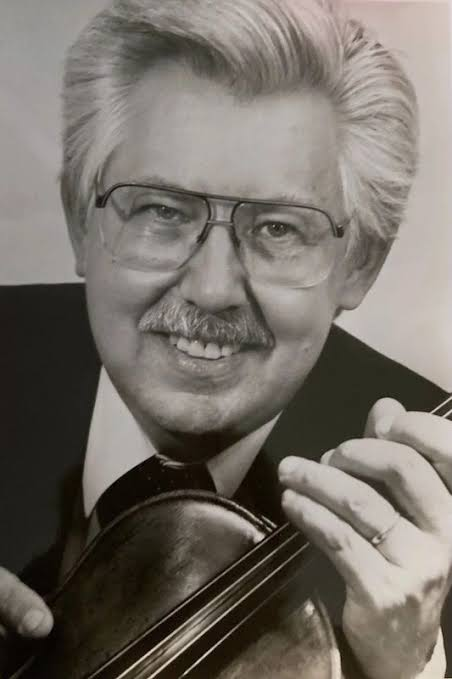
- Born: May 13, 1935; Detroit, Michigan, U.S.
- Died: January 12, 2023 (aged 87); Avon, Connecticut, U.S.
- Occupation(s): Violinist, teacher

Charles Treger (May 13, 1935 – January 12, 2023) was an American violinist and teacher. He was the first and only American to win first place in the Henryk Wieniawski Violin Competition in Poznań, Poland.

== Early life ==
Charles Treger was born in Detroit, Michigan. He began taking violin lessons when he was 7 years old and made his public debut at 11, playing the Violin Concerto No. 2 by Henryk Wieniawski. At age 16, he started playing in the violin section of the Detroit Symphony.

Treger studied under the renowned music tutor William Engel during his formative years, alongside missionary Edgar Louton and later under William Kroll at the Peabody Conservatory in Baltimore, Maryland. He also studied with Szymon Goldberg and Ivan Galamian at the Aspen Music School.

== Performing career ==
In 1962 at age 27, Charles Treger became the first and only American to win first prize at the Henryk Wieniawski Violin Competition in Poznań, in Poland. This win came during the Cold War and prompted congratulations from President John F. Kennedy.

He performed his repertoire of more than fifty concertos with orchestras worldwide and conductors including Claudio Abbado, Seiji Ozawa, and Pierre Boulez. He appeared with the Pittsburgh Symphony as soloist for a 30-concert tour of 14 European and Middle Eastern Countries. Other notable performances are a series of three Town Hall concerts entitled "A Romantic Revival For The Violin" and three Carnegie Hall performances in celebration of his 25th anniversary season.

A founding member of the Chamber Music Society of Lincoln Center, Treger further performed with pianist André Watts as the Treger-Watts duo by touring for 7 years. He also performed in chamber music and recital with such artists as Rudolf Serkin, Emanuel Ax, Isaac Stern, Pinchas Zukerman, Itzhak Perlman, Mstislav Rostropovich, Yehudi Menuhin and The Bach Aria Group. Charles Treger returned to Poland, where he had previously won the Wieniawski Competition, for 5 tours.

Treger's instrument was the "Hartmann" Stradivarius, made in 1723, described as "a prime example of Stradivarius' golden period."

== Teaching career ==
In 1960, Charles Treger became an associate music professor at the University of Iowa, Iowa City and also played in the Iowa String Quartet. He left Iowa in 1970 to move to New York City continuing his performing career, and in 1972 also became a visiting professor at the Hartt School of Music in Hartford, Connecticut.

In 1984, he became president and director of the Meadowmount School of Music in Westport, New York. He was also a visiting professor at Lawrence University in Appleton, WI, where he received an honorary Doctor of Fine Arts degree. Later, Treger was a visiting professor at the University of Massachusetts at Amherst. He served on the National Endowment for the Arts and the Rockefeller Foundation.

== Later life ==
Charles Treger died on January 12, 2023, at age 87, at his home in Avon, Connecticut.
