= Margaret Pardee =

American violinist (1920–2016)

- Born: May 10, 1920; Valdosta, Georgia, U.S.
- Died: January 26, 2016 (aged 95); Westbury, New York, U.S.
- Education: Juilliard School
- Occupations: Violinist, teacher
- Years active: 1942–2008
- Known for: Teaching at Juilliard
- Spouse: Daniel Butterly

Margaret Pardee Butterly (May 10, 1920 – January 26, 2016) was an American violinist and violin teacher.

== Life and career ==
Pardee was born in 1920 and grew up in Valdosta, Georgia. She graduated from the Juilliard School where she studied with Ivan Galamian, Sascha Jacobsen, Albert Spalding and Louis Persinger.

After a brief solo career, Pardee started teaching in the 1940s. She taught at Juilliard for over 60 years. She also taught at the Meadowmount School of Music summer programs. She married Daniel Butterly. In addition to mentoring her students, she was a surrogate mother to many and housed one or two students at a time for many years. Throughout her career, she collected violins and violas. In her mid-eighties, she donated a set of 30 violins and violas to the Juilliard School, including a 1771 Guadagnini violin, an 1845 Gagliano violin, and an 1810 J.B. Ceruti half-size violin. Her former students perform in ensembles and orchestras throughout the country including the New York Philharmonic, the Saint Louis Symphony and others. In an interview she reveled in the success of her students and the fact that she continued to hear from them in later years. She died at the age of 95 in 2016.

In regard to teaching Pardee said, "The composer gives us an indication of what he'd like. But the musician has to feel the phrasing so it goes over to the audience. That's a major part of making a musician."
