= Gerardo Ribeiro =

Gerardo Ribeiro (born 1950, Oporto, Portugal) is a violinist who serves on the faculty of the Bienen School of Music at Northwestern University. He studied at the Juilliard School of Music under Ivan Galamian. He previously taught at Central Michigan University, Florida State University, and the University of Rochester's Eastman School of Music. In 2001, Ribeiro received a Recognition Award by the Presidential Scholars Program.

In 2000, he won the highest Civilian Title of "Comendador" from his native Portugal. He serves on the faculty of the Meadowmount School of Music, and in January 2006 was invited to the Australian String Academy Summer School, held in Sydney. Ribeiro is a chamber music coach and appears for performance classes at the Midwest Young Artists pre-college music conservatory in Fort Sheridan, Illinois.
