= Robert Canetti =

Israeli conductor, violinist

Robert Canetti (Hebrew: רוברט קנטי; born 1948) is an Israeli conductor, violinist.

== Education ==
The first violin teacher of Canetti was his father, Jacques Canetti. He also studied with Rami Shevelov, a student of Ivan Galamian and with Zvi Rotenberg, a Lucien Capet student. In 1972, he went to the Juilliard School of Music in New York, where he studied with Sally Thomas and Ivan Galamian.

== Career ==
When Canetti was 18 he became leader of the Israeli Pro-Musica Ensemble, conducted by Dalia Atlas. In 1978, the Haifa Symphony Orchestra invited him to be leader and soloist of the orchestra.

In 1996, Canetti became Music Director and conductor of the New Israeli Chamber Ensemble. He also organized a Music Festival, that included a Music Course and an International Violin Competition, every year in different country.

Canetti is an Honorary Professor of the Astana (Kazakhstan) Music Academy; of Indianapolis University (Athens campus) and an Honorary Guest Artist of the Moscow Tchaikovsky Conservatory.

He was Professor of Academic studies at the Magnificat Institute, Jerusalem filiation of Vicenza Conservatory

Since 2018, Canetti is member of staff of The conservatory of the Jerusalem music academy of music and dance, as well as External studies department of Jerusalem music academy. Robert Canetti is founder and Artistic Director of Jerusalem Seasons Festival

Canetti gives master classes for violin, chamber orchestra and conducting all over the world.
