= Carmel Kaine =

Australian violinist (1937–2013)

Carmel Kaine (22 March 1937 – 21 April 2013) was an Australian classical violinist.

She was born in Wagga Wagga, New South Wales and studied at the New South Wales Conservatorium, graduating at age 17 with the prize for the most outstanding student. Two years later, she spent a year as a member of the South Australian Symphony Orchestra. She then continued her studies at the Royal Academy of Music in London, where she won the three violin prizes and the Violin Scholarship in her first year.

Kaine furthered her studies at the Juilliard School in New York with Ivan Galamian. At the Juilliard School, Kaine was awarded a Violin Fellowship and in 1967 was awarded the first prize at the Vienna International Violin Competition. Recitals for the BBC followed both as a soloist and in chamber ensembles. She was a member of the Academy of St Martin in the Fields for ten years, making solo recordings with the academy and performing at major festivals throughout Europe. Her recording of Vivaldi's La stravaganza, Sir Neville Marriner conducting, won a Grand Prix du Disque and a Rosette Award in The Penguin Guide to Recorded Classical Music (Decca Records425721).

Kaine was a professor at the Royal Academy of Music for twelve years and in 1983 was made a Fellow. She was invited by Yehudi Menuhin to read at his school in Cobham, Surrey. In 1990 Kaine took up the Senior Lecturer position at the Queensland Conservatorium Griffith University and for five years was head of department.

In 1991, with her husband John Willison, she founded the Limpinwood Ensemble and many performances have been given for the ABC and at Tyalgum Classical Music Festival, which they also founded. She also founded the Queensland Conservatorium Soloists, which has raised over $30,000 for the conservatorium's String Department.
