= Joseph Genualdi =

American violinist

Joseph Genualdi (born 1954) is an American violinist.

== Early life and education ==
The son of professional musicians, Genualdi was born in Clinton, Iowa, and grew up in Connecticut. His formal training began at age 11, as a private student of Broadus Erle at Yale University. Three years later he enrolled at The North Carolina School of the Arts studying violin with Vartan Manoogian. Upon graduation, he was admitted to the Curtis Institute of Music where he continued his violin studies with Jascha Brodsky and Ivan Galamian. During his years at Curtis he formed a lifelong friendship with Felix Galimir.He was a fellow of Silliman College at Yale University and the recipient of the Wardwell Fellowship at The Yale School of Music.

== Career ==
At age 22 Genualdi won an audition to serve as associate concertmaster of the San Francisco Symphony; it was during this time that he became a founding member and first violinist of the Muir Quartet. Under the aegis of the Wardwell Fellowship at Yale University, the Muir captured international attention by winning first prize in 1980 at Le Concours d'Evian and also the 1981 Walter W. Naumburg Chamber Music Award. Their performance at the White House was featured on national television. With pianist Jean-Philippe Collard, the Muir Quartet (with Genualdi as first violin) won the Grand Prix du Disque for their recording of the César Franck piano quintet.

In addition to his participation in the Muir Quartet, Joseph Genualdi has been violinist of the Los Angeles Piano Quartet, a founding member of the Chicago String Quartet, and artistic director for seventeen years of the Chicago Chamber Musicians.

Genualdi has participated in many festivals including Spoleto (Italy), Ravinia, Taos, Affinis (Japan), Kneisel Hall, Euro Arts, Bravo Colorado, Skaneateles, Angel Fire, Nîmes (France), and Cheltenham. But his most enduring affiliation was with the Marlboro Festival and Rudolf Serkin, a guiding influence on his career. His other mentors have included Menahem Pressler, Oscar Shumsky, Raphael Hillyer and Mieczysław Horszowski.

Genualdi has served on the faculties of Yale University, the University of Oregon, DePaul University, California State University—Northridge – The University of North Carolina School of the Arts. He has taught summers at the Taos School of Music, Kneisel Hall, Interharmony (Italy) and the Euro Arts Festival in Leipzig, Germany. He is currently Professor of Violin at the UMKC Conservatory.

A longtime supporter of new music, Joseph Genualdi has worked closely with numerous composers: Richard Wilson, Pierre Boulez, Chen Yi, George Perle, John Harbison, David Del Tredici, Ned Rorem, James Mobberly, William Bolcom, Ellen Taaffe Zwillich, Aaron Jay Kernis, Steven Stucky, Zhou Long, Bernard Rands, John Corigliano, Paul Rudy and Peter Lieberson – among many others. He is featured on thirteen commercially available CDs on such labels as EMI, Musical Heritage Society, Sony Classics, Albany Records, Summit, Cedille Records, Music Masters-Pickwick, and Naxos.

Genualdi, who won first prize in the Hudson Valley Philharmonic International String Competition, continues his career as soloist in frequent concerto performances and duo recitals. In April 2023 Joseph Genualdi served as a member of the jury for the Josef Hassid International Violin Competition in Tartu, Estonia.
