= Konstantin G. Mostras =

Russian musician (1886–1965)

Konstantin Georgiyevich Mostras (Russian: Константин Георгиевич Мострас; 16 April 1886 – 6 September 1965) was a Soviet and Russian violinist and teacher.

He studied at the Moscow Philharmonic School of Music and Drama until 1914, and later was a teacher there (from 1914 till 1922). During this period he performed in quartets and other ensembles. From 1922 he taught the violin at the Moscow Conservatory, where he became head of the violin department, and in 1931 introduced his unique method on violin teaching. From 1922 to 1932 he was one of the directors of Persimfans, the conductorless symphony orchestra. As a teacher he played a significant role in the development of a Soviet violin school; among his pupils were Ivan Galamian, Mikhail Terian, Andrey Abramenkov and Marina Yashvili. He wrote and edited many instructional works and transcriptions for the violin, including an edition of Tchaikovsky's Violin Concerto (in collaboration with David Oistrakh) with a commentary on technique (Moscow, 1947) and studies for solo violin, as well as valuable writings on violin technique.

== Writings ==
- Intonatsiya na skripke [Intonation on the violin] (Moscow and Leningrad, 1947, 2/1963; Ger. trans., 1961)
- Ritmicheskaya distsiplina skripacha [The rhythmical discipline of the violinist] (Moscow, 1951; Ger. trans., 1959)
- Dinamika v skripichnom iskusstve [The dynamics of the art of violin playing] (Moscow, 1956)
- Sistema domashnikh zanyatiy skripacha [A system of home studies for the violinist] (Moscow, 1956)
- Metodicheskiy komentariy k 24 kaprisam dlya skripki solo N. Paganini [A technical commentary on Paganini's 24 Caprices for violin solo] (Moscow, 1959)
- I.M. Yampol′sky/R
