= Suzanne Cesbron-Viseur =

French opera singer (1879–1967)

Suzanne Cesbron

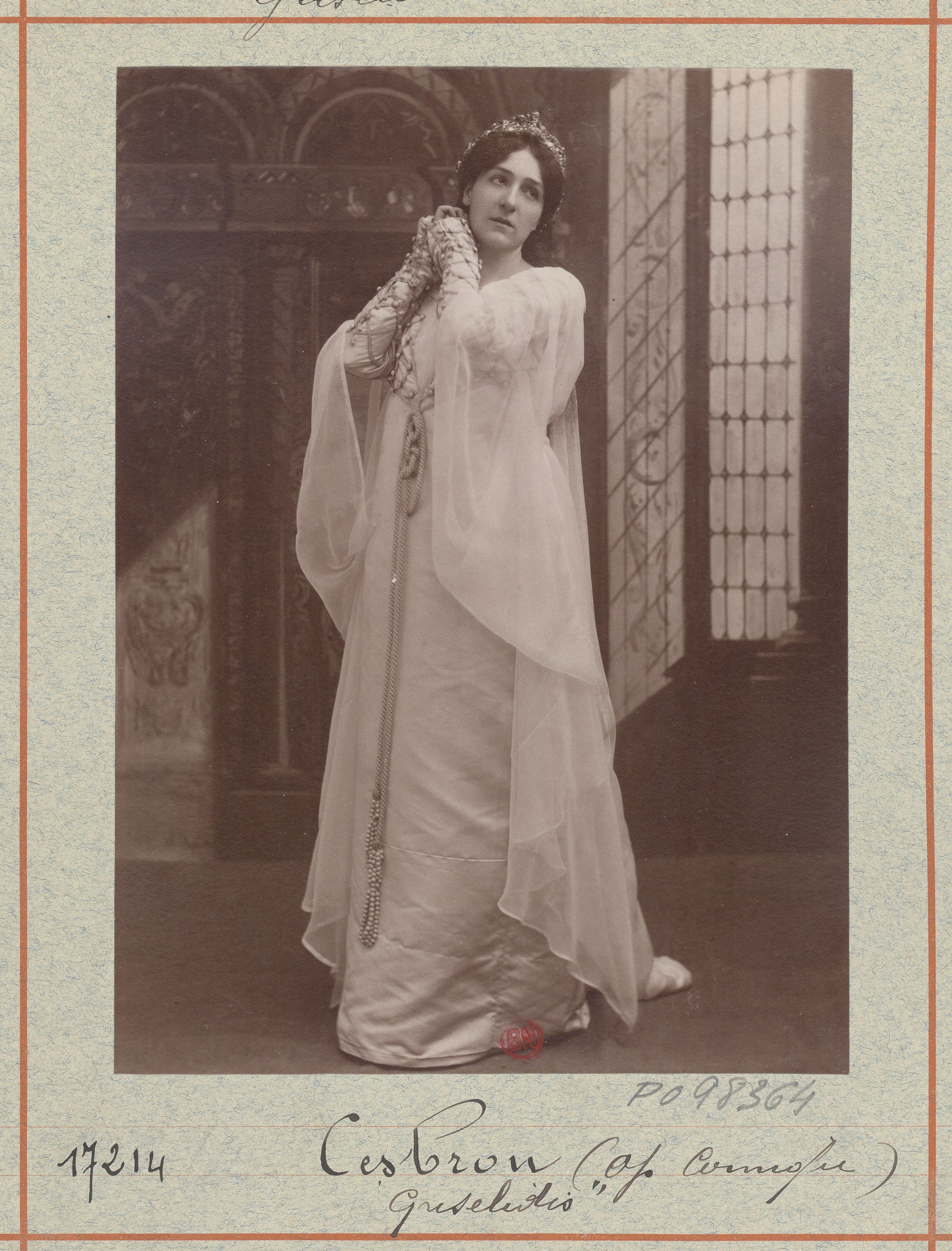

Suzanne Catherine Cesbron-Viseur (24 May 1879 – 23 August 1967) was a French soprano and singing teacher.

== Life ==
Born in the 17th arrondissement of Paris, Cesbron was the daughter of painter Achille Cesbron. She studied singing at the Conservatoire de Paris where she took classes from Pauline Viardot. She won first prizes in singing and music theory in 1900, then first prizes in opera and opéra comique in 1901.

She made her debut at the Opéra-Comique in 1902 and at the Opéra de Paris in 1923. Her soprano talents were particularly noted in her interpretation of Grisélidis by Jules Massenet, who valued her highly. She also sang in his Manon, Le Cid, as Charlotte in Werther, as Thaïs and Sapho.

She also sang Reynaldo Hahn's La Carmélite, Le Roi d'Ys, Le Cor fleuri (premiere), Louise, Tosca, La Vie de bohème, Hamlet, Lohengrin, Tannhauser, Pelléas et Melisande, Madame Butterfly, Roméo et Juliette, The Tales of Hoffmann, Faust, Les Huguenots and Pamina's role in The Magic Flute.

She sang on tour in Brussels, Algiers, Tunis and in the major provincial venues (Bordeaux, Nice, etc.). In 1918 she married the musician and conductor Georges Viseur.

She was appointed professor of singing at the Conservatoire in 1927, where her most famous pupils were Germaine Lubin, Irène Joachim and Régine Crespin.

The recordings of some of her interpretations (notably Massenet's aria of Sapho, recorded in 1929) exist in the series Les Introuvables du Chant Francais.

Cesbron-Viseur died in Seilhan (Haute-Garonne) 23 August 1967.

== Bibliography ==
- Jean Gourret, Encyclopédie des fabuleuse cantatrices de l'Opéra de Paris, 1981.
