= Paul Makanowitzky =

American musician

Paul Makanowitzky (June 20, 1920 Stockholm – February 24, 1998 Freeport, Maine) was an American violinist, and violin teacher.

== Life ==
He studied with Ivan Galamian, and Jacques Thibaud. He made his debut in 1929, in Salle Gaveau, Paris, and New York debut in 1937. In 1942, he volunteered to fight in World War II for the United States.

In 1966, be began teaching at the Juilliard School, the Curtis Institute and the Meadowmount School of Music. He taught at the University of Michigan, from 1970 to 1983.

== Discography ==
- "Bach, Beethoven: Complete Violin Sonatas", Doremi Records, 7946
