= SS Tyalgum =

Australian steamer, built 1925, wrecked 1939

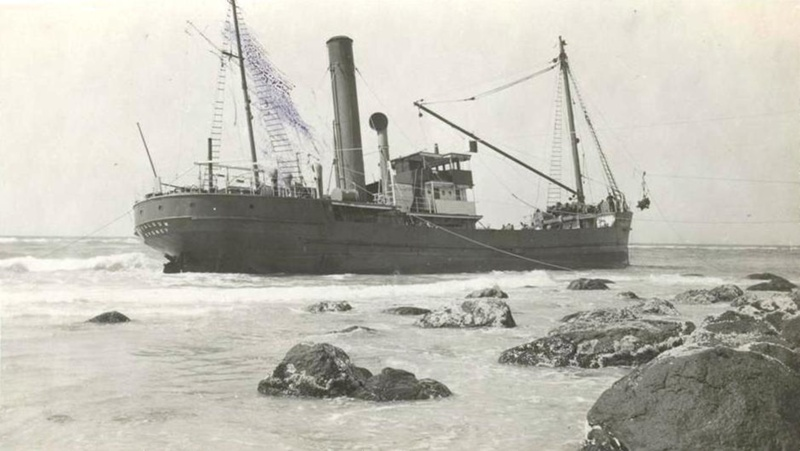

History
- Name: Tyalgum
- Owner: North Coast Steam Navigation Company
- Builder: Lithgows Limited, Port Glasgow
- Launched: 1925
- Fate: Wrecked on 25 August 1939

The SS Tyalgum was a 544-ton steamer ship which was operated by the North Coast Steam Navigation Company which primarily operated between the port at Tweed Heads and Sydney.

It was wrecked on 25 August 1939 on a sandbar at Tweed Heads and was later dismantled in place.

== Background ==
The ship was constructed in Scotland by Lithgows Limited in 1925 and, soon after, was purchased by the North Coast Steam Navigation Company.

It was purpose built for the coastal route between Tweed Heads and Sydney and the inland river ports of the Northern Rivers region' this was known as the 'Northern Rivers Run'. It is for this reason that it was named for the village of Tyalgum which was nearby.

It was designed to be a "bar jumper" to combat the frequent sandbars on its route.

== Fate ==
The SS Tyalgum was wrecked in the early morning of 25 August 1939 on Flagstaff Beach, now known as Duranbah Beach, in Tweed Heads while carrying a cargo of coal, cement and benzene. The incident was caused by poor weather which caused the engine room and stokehold to flood. They attempted to pump the water out but, due to a leak, it could not be salvaged and a tug was unsuccessful at freeing it.

No crew were injured in the sinking and, immediately following, a line was rigged between the ship and shore to transport them, and their cargo, to land. Later, after refloating efforts failed, the wreck was sold for scrap metal and it was dismantled in place.

In 2024 the ships bell, salvaged during the wrecking, was acquired by the Tyalgum District Community Association.

== Gallery ==
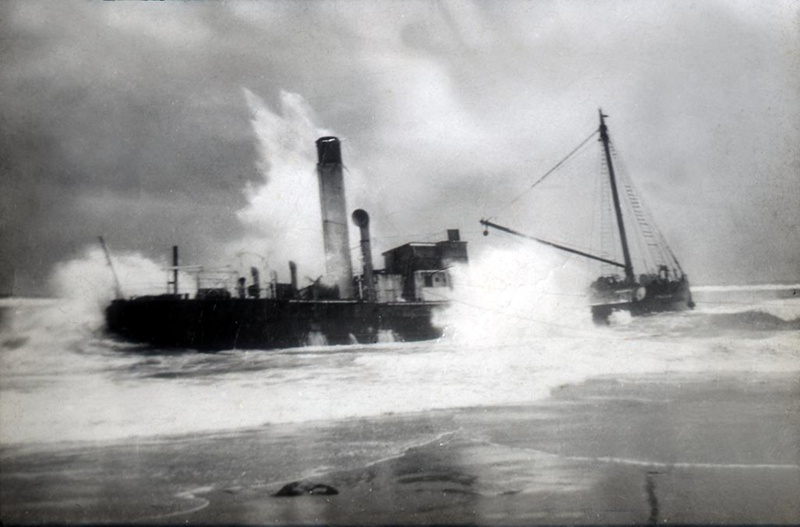
Wreck of SS Tyalgum on Duranbah beach, 1939

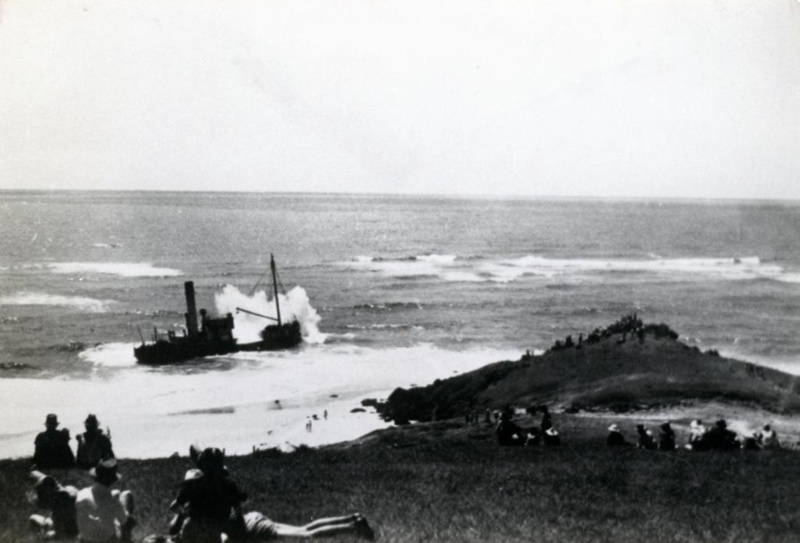
Wreck of SS Tyalgum, people watching from grassy hill, 1939

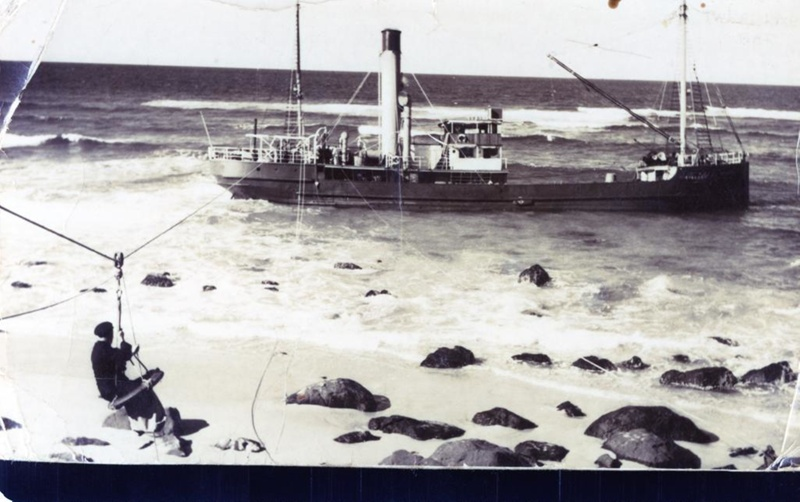
Man in bosun chair with the SS Tyalgum aground, 1939

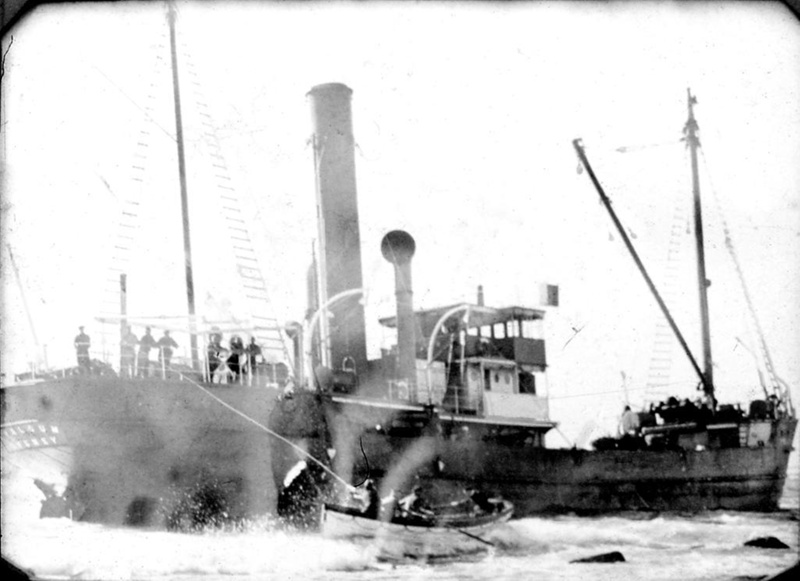
Wreck of the SS Tyalgum, 1939

== Collections ==
The Australian National Maritime Museum holds a collection of newspaper clippings that relate to the wrecking.
