= Seilhan =

- Commune
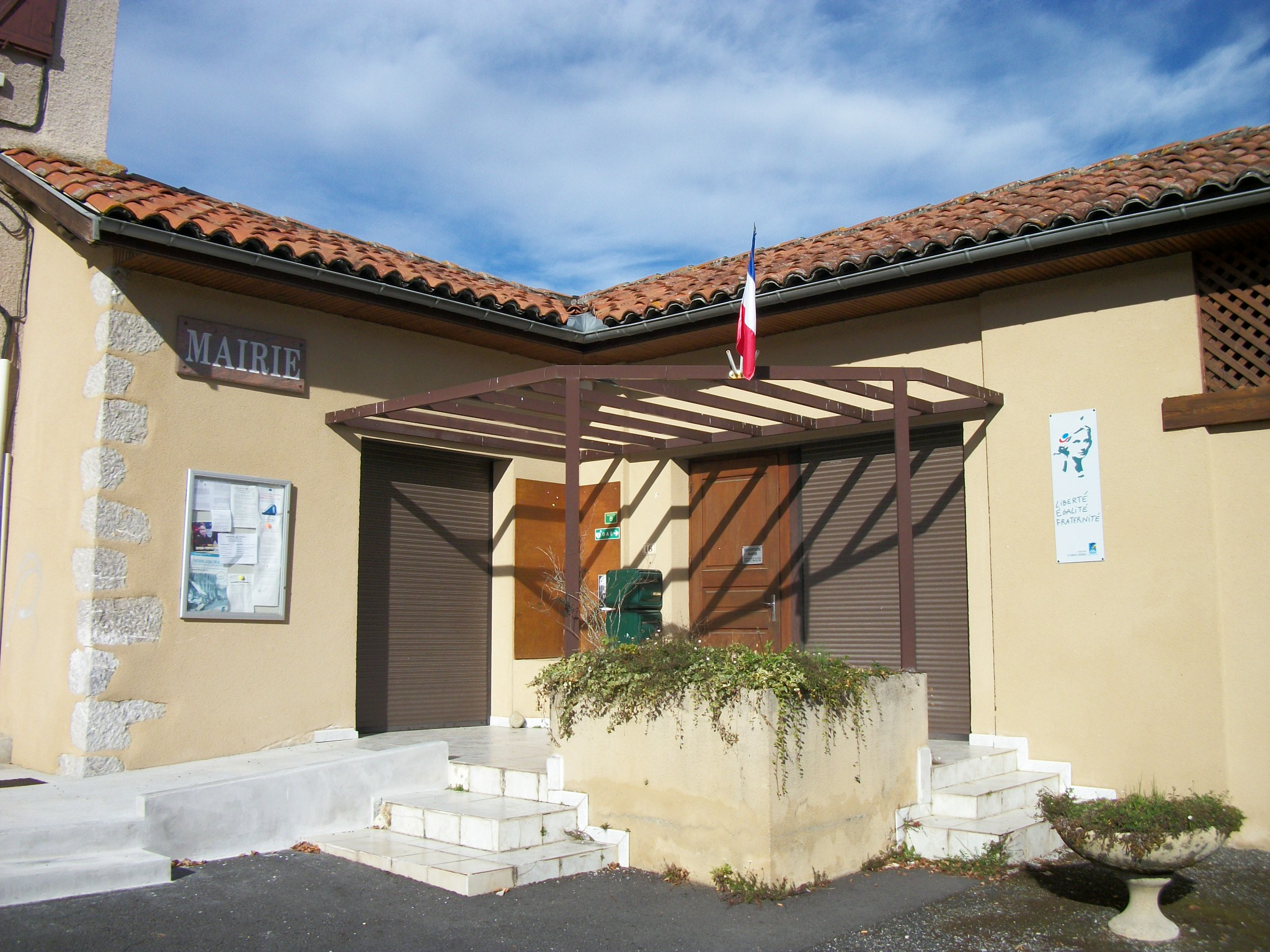
- The town hall in Seilhan
- Location of Seilhan
- Location within France Location within Occitanie
- Coordinates: 43°03′06″N 0°34′36″E
- Country: France
- Region: Occitania
- Department: Haute-Garonne
- Arrondissement: Saint-Gaudens
- Canton: Bagnères-de-Luchon

Government
  - Mayor (2020–2026): Denise Vigneaux
- Area^{1}: 4.68 km^{2} (1.81 sq mi)
- Elevation: 470 m (1,540 ft)
- Highest elevation: 702 m (2,303 ft)
- Lowest elevation: 417 m (1,368 ft)
- Population (2023): 207
  - Density: 44.2/km^{2} (115/sq mi)
- Time zone: UTC+01:00 (CET)
  - Summer (DST): UTC+02:00 (CEST)
- INSEE/Postal code: 31542 /31510
- ^{1} French Land Register data, which excludes lakes, ponds, glaciers > 1 km^{2} (0.386 sq mi or 247 acres) and river estuaries.

Seilhan (French pronunciation: [sɛjɑ̃]; Occitan: Selhan) is a commune in the Haute-Garonne department in southwestern France.

== Name ==
The name Seilhan is thought to derive from an old Gallo-Roman geographical name (Caelius + anum) but seems to be associated with fountains and ponds, so may derive from another word meaning "bucket." Some variations on the name include Seilan, Seilhean, Seillan, and Seillant.

The soprano Suzanne Cesbron-Viseur died in Seilhan 23 August 1967.

== Population ==
Historical population
Year	Pop.	±% p.a.
1968	202	—
1975	194	−0.58%
1982	182	−0.91%
1990	188	+0.41%
1999	187	−0.06%
2007	202	+0.97%
2012	198	−0.40%
2017	207	+0.89%
2023	207	+0.00%
Source: INSEE

== See also ==
- Communes of the Haute-Garonne department
