= William Barbini =

William (Bill) Barbini
- Origin: New York City, NY
- Genres: Classical
- Occupation: Violinist
- Instrument: Violin
- Labels: Various

William (Bill) Barbini (born 1947) is an American violinist. He took his diploma from Juilliard School in 1970, studying with Ivan Galamian among others. He thereafter became one of the youngest members selected to the New York Philharmonic violin section. During his tenure with the NY Philharmonic, Barbini also performed as principal violinist with the Gramercy String Quartet. With Barbini as principal, the Gramercy was commissioned by Pierre Boulez for a number of pre-concert performances at Avery Fisher Hall. While in New York, Barbini also served as concertmaster for the Joffrey Ballet and soloist with the Festival Orchestra at the Norwalk Performing Arts Festival.

Chamber music has been a focus of Barbini's career. He has performed with the Philharmonia Quartet, Balihry Piano Trio, San Francisco Contemporary Players and Music Now. In 1983, Barbini was appointed concertmaster of the Sacramento Symphony, and in 1984 he joined the Sacramento State University music department. Barbini serves on the faculty of the San Francisco Conservatory of Music, as music director of the Chamber Music Society of Sacramento, and as concertmaster of the Ariel Ensemble. Barbini is also concertmaster for Chico Symphony, Monterey Symphony, Pro Art Symphony and Classical Philharmonic. He has also performed with the San Francisco Ballet Orchestra.

In addition to a lifelong collaboration with the violinist Kineko Okumura, Barbini has performed in recitals worldwide, and in concerto performances with Tonkünstler Orchestra, Niagara Falls Philharmonic, Lancaster Symphony Orchestra and the New York Philharmonic. Barbini is also a regular guest at international music festivals, including the Pacific Music Festival, Festival of New American Music, Festival de San Miguel Allende and the Other Minds Festival.

== Instrument ==
Barbini's primary instrument is a Guarnerius del Gesù violin built in the early 1700s.

== Discography ==
- Principal violin on Marco Beltrami's Hellboy Soundtrack, Varèse Sarabande, 2004
- Howard Hersh: The Pony Concerto - Chamber Music, 2000-2005, Albany Records, 2007
