= Capet Quartet =

French musical ensemble

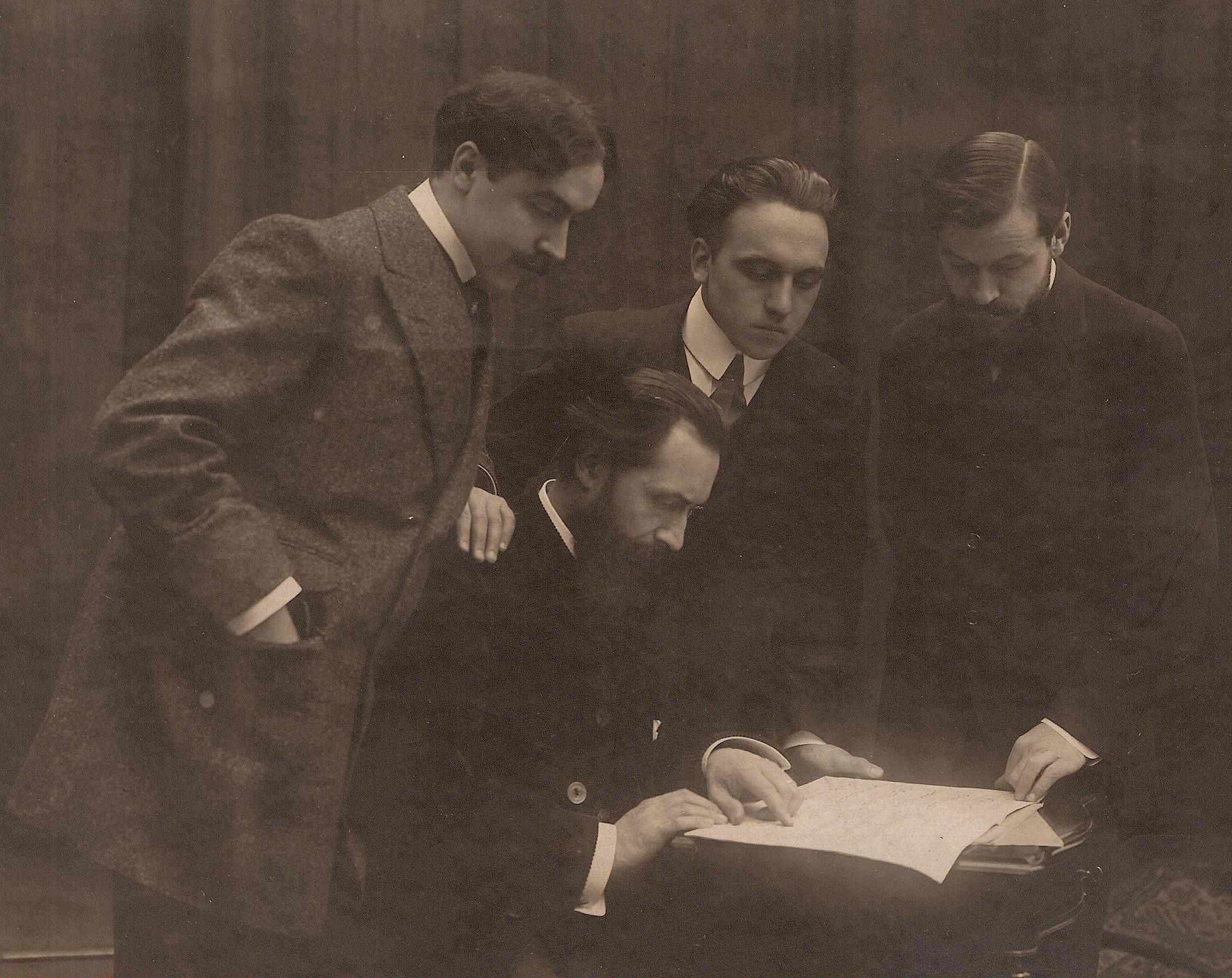
Henri Casadesus, Lucien Capet, Marcel Casadesus, Maurice Hewitt (l. to r.)

The Capet String Quartet was a French musical ensemble founded in 1893, which remained in existence until 1928 or later. It made a number of recordings and was considered one of the leading string quartets of its time.

== Personnel ==
The personnel of the Capet Quartet (other than the leader, Lucien Capet) changed fairly often, and are reported differently in variant sources. The original line-up appears to have included a player named Giron, and during the first decade Henri Casadesus and Marcel Casadesus, uncles of the celebrated pianist Robert Casadesus, played viola and cello within the group, which often rehearsed at the Casadesus household.

In 1903, it had become:

1st violin: Lucien Capet
2nd violin: André Touret
viola: Louis Bailly
violoncello: Louis Hasselmans

By 1910 the team was established which survived into the 1920s to make the well-known recordings in 1928:

1st violin: Lucien Capet
2nd violin: Maurice Hewitt
viola: Henri Benoît
cello: Camille Delobelle

== Origins ==
Lucien Capet (b. Paris, 1873) had been a pupil of Morin at the Paris Conservatoire, and appeared as a soloist very widely, especially with the Concerts Lamoureux. He taught at the Bordeaux Conservatoire from 1899 to 1903 and from 1907 in Paris, wrote three string quartets, and a work on the art of bowing. Louis Hasselmans (b. Paris 1878) took first prize in the Paris Conservatoire in 1893, became cellist with the Concerts Lamoureux, and was also a conductor: he later became attached to the Opéra-Comique. In 1924 it was said that the quartet devoted itself mainly to the performance of the Beethoven repertoire, but dedicated a few performances each year to modern music.

== Recordings ==
- Beethoven: Quartet in A major op 18 no 5 (Columbia Records, D 1659-62); recorded 1928 10 05.
- Beethoven: Quartet in F major op 59 no 1 (Col. D 15065-70); recorded 1928 06 15.
- Beethoven: Quartet in E flat major 'Harp', op 74 (Col., D 15061-64; L 2248-51); recorded 1928 06 21+22.
- Beethoven: Quartet in C sharp minor, op 131 (Col., D 15097-15101; L 2283-87); recorded 1928 10 05+08.
- Beethoven: Quartet in A minor, op 132 (Col., D 15114-8; L 2272-76); recorded 1928 10 05,09,10.
- Mozart: Quartet in C major K 465 (Col., D 15110-3; L 2290-93); recorded 1928 10 11.
- Schumann: Quartet in A minor op 41 no 1 (Col., D 15107-9; L 2329-31); recorded 1928 10 03.
- Debussy: Quartet in G minor op 10 (1893) (Col., D 15085-8); recorded: 1928 06 10-12.
- Franck: Quintet in F minor, with Marcel Ciampi (pno) (Col., D 15102-6); recorded 1928 10 10+15.
- Haydn: Quartet in D major op 64 no 5 'Lark' (Col., D 13070-2); recorded 1928 10 03.
- Ravel: Quartet in F major (Col., D 15057-60); recorded 1928 06 15+19.
- Schubert: Quartet in D minor 'Death and the Maiden' (Col. D 15053-6); recorded 1928 06 19+21.

== Sources ==
- A. Eaglefield-Hull, A Dictionary of Modern Music and Musicians (Dent, London 1924).
- L. Capet, Technique de l'Archet.
- R.D. Darrell, The Gramophone Shop Encyclopedia of Recorded Music (New York, 1936).
