= Lamoreaux =

Lamoreaux (pronounced [la.mɔ.ʁo]) is an American English surname almost exclusively found in the United States, where it constitutes a variant of the more numerous French family name Lamoureux (pronounced [la.mu.ʁø]; from French l'amoureux for "the loving one", "the amorous one", "the lover").

== Notable people ==
Notable people with this name include:

- J. Neal Lamoreaux (1889–1954), American politician
- Naomi Lamoreaux (born 1950), American economic historian
- Rosa Lamoreaux, American soprano
- Silas W. Lamoreaux (1843–1909), American lawyer
- Wilbur Lamoreaux (1907–1963), American speedway rider
