= Tyalgum, New South Wales =

Village in New South Wales, Australia

Tyalgum
- Town
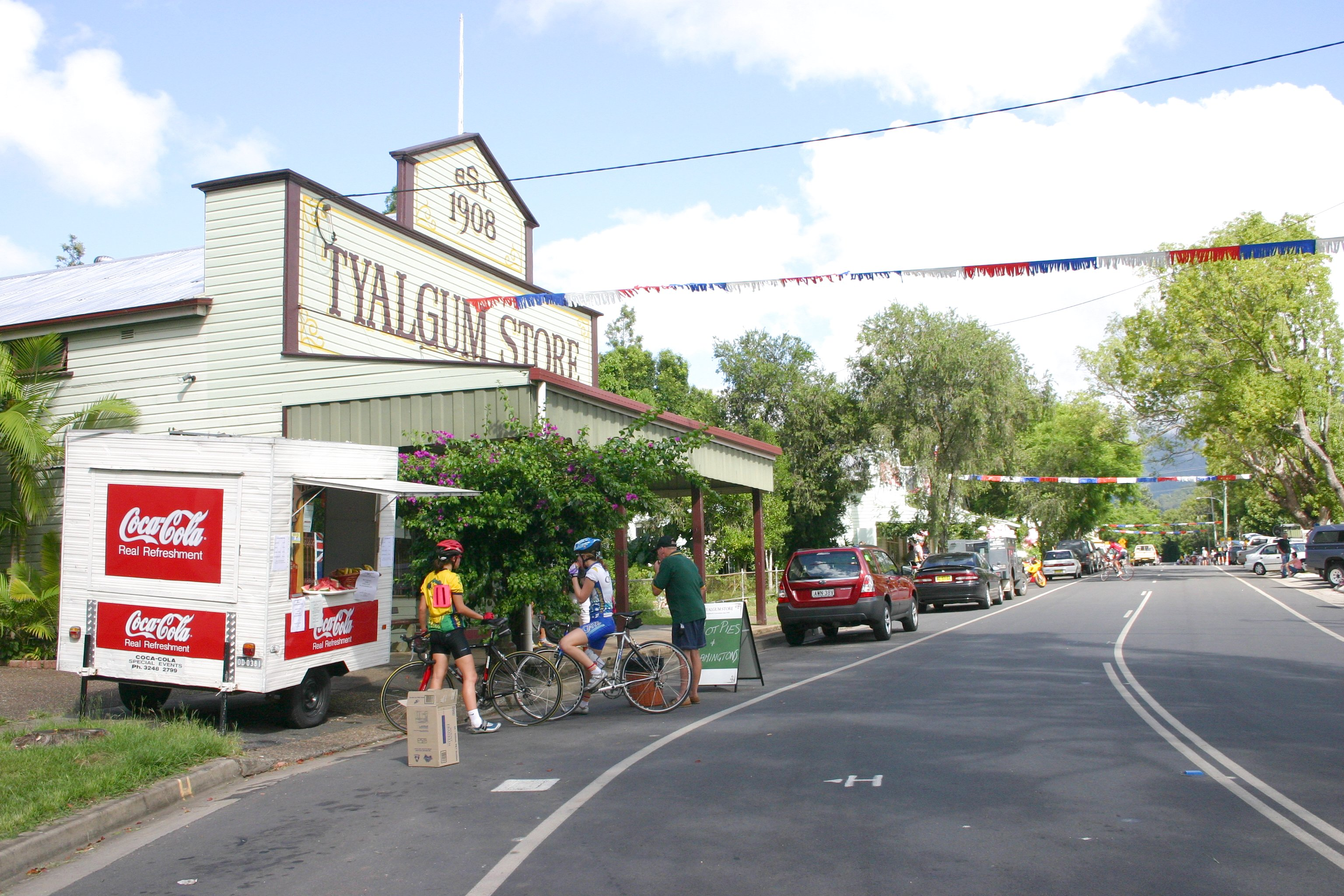
- Australia Day 2006, Coolman Street, Tyalgum

- Coordinates: 28°21′30″S 153°12′28″E
- Country: Australia
- State: New South Wales
- LGA: Tweed Shire

Government
  - State electorate: Lismore
  - Federal division: Richmond
- Elevation: 55.0 m (180.4 ft)

Population
  - Total: 521 (2021 census)
- Postcode: 2484
- Mean max temp: 29.4 °C (84.9 °F)
- Mean min temp: 12.5 °C (54.5 °F)
- Annual rainfall: 1,555.4 mm (61.24 in)

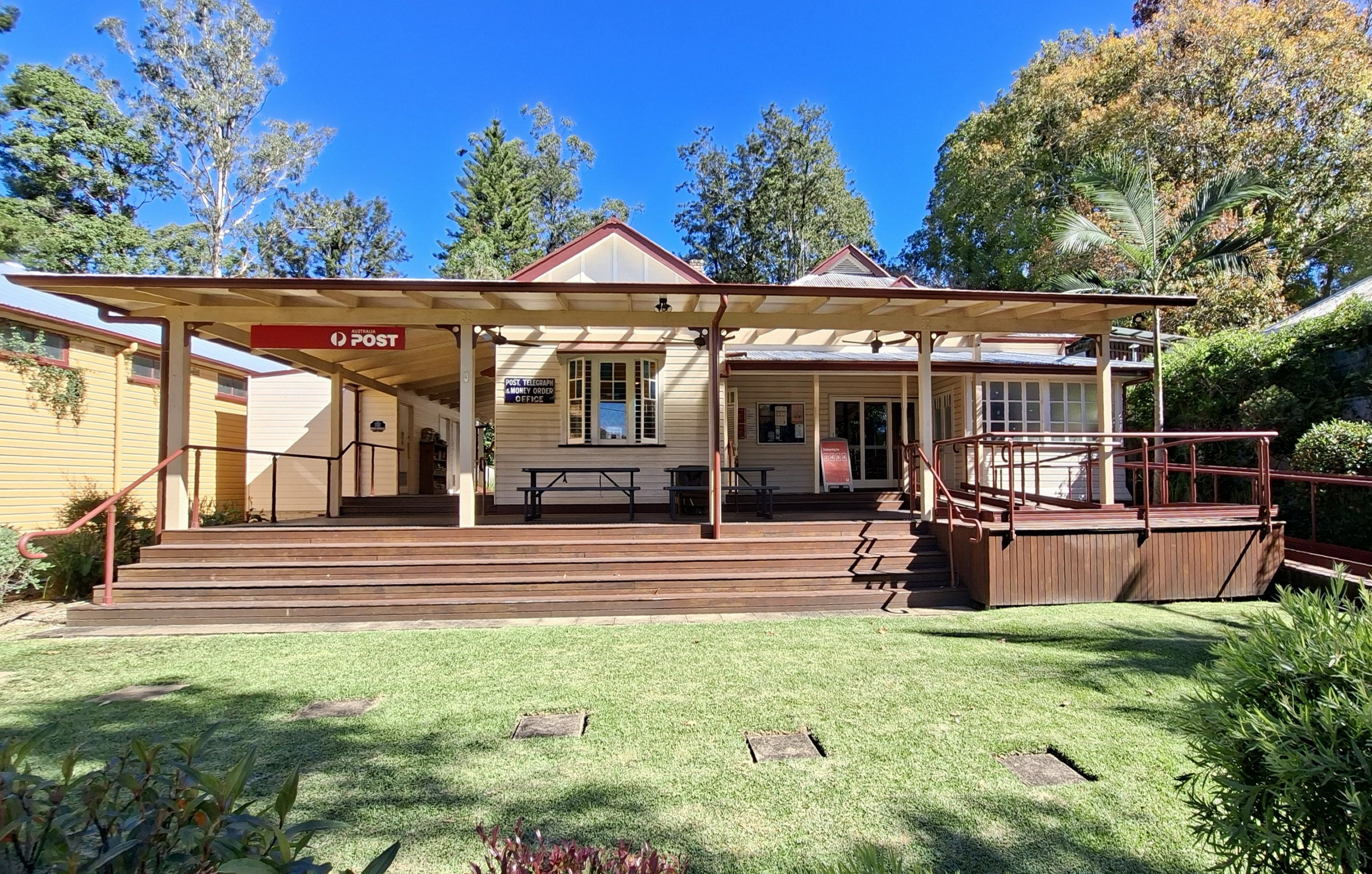
Tyalgum May 2026: Post Office building

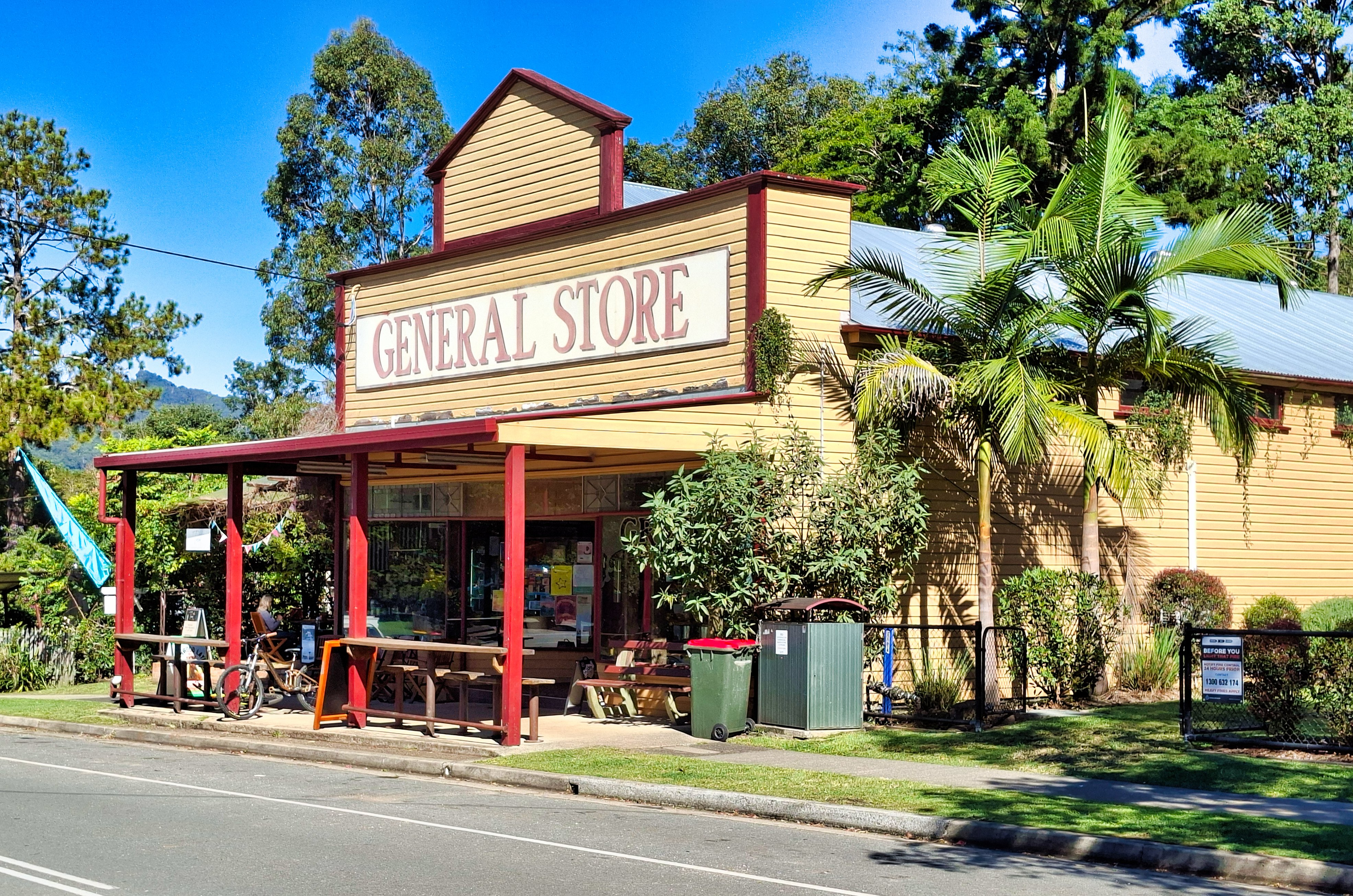
Tyalgum May 2026: General Store

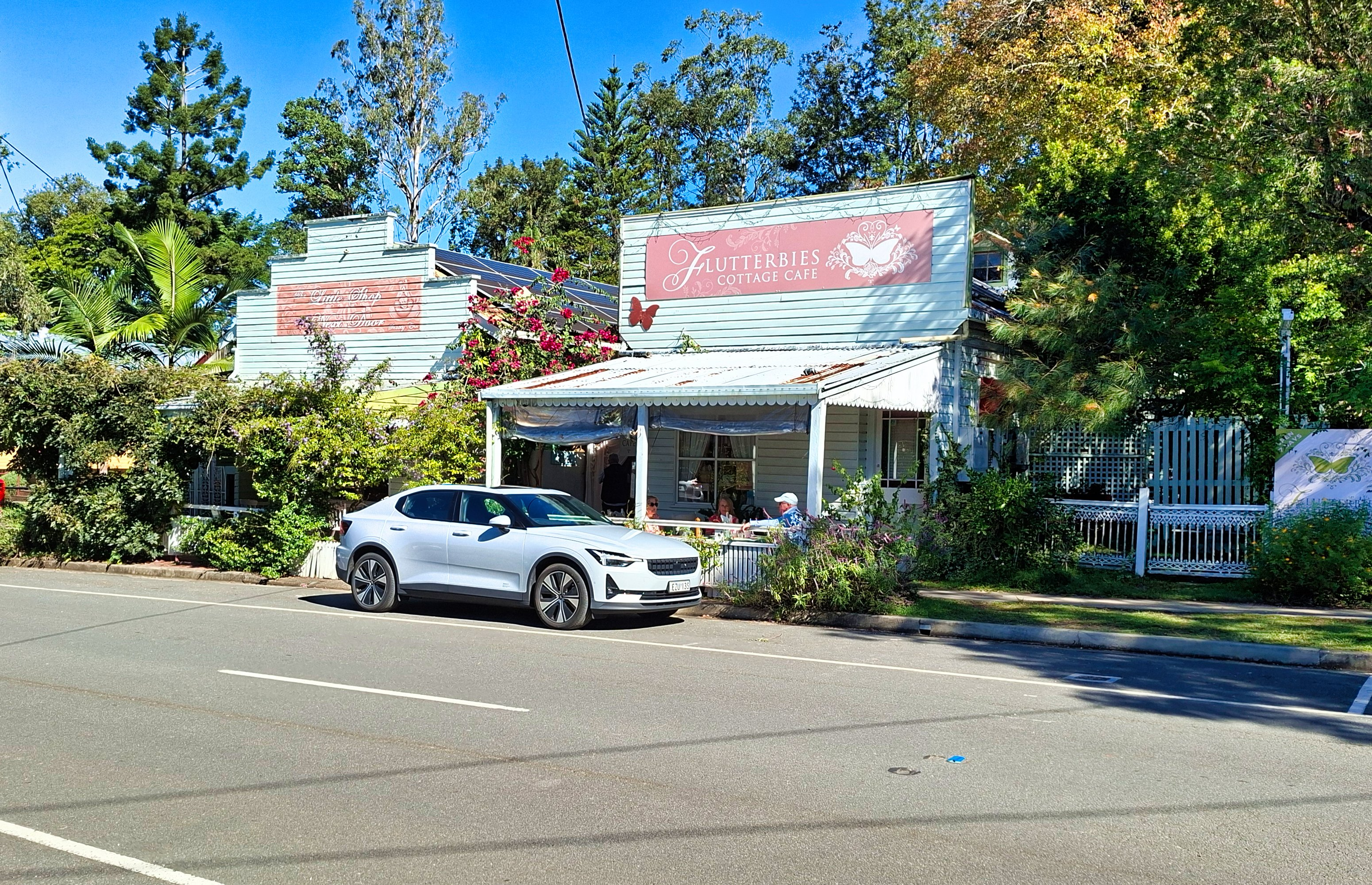
Tyalgum May 2026: 2 original buildings

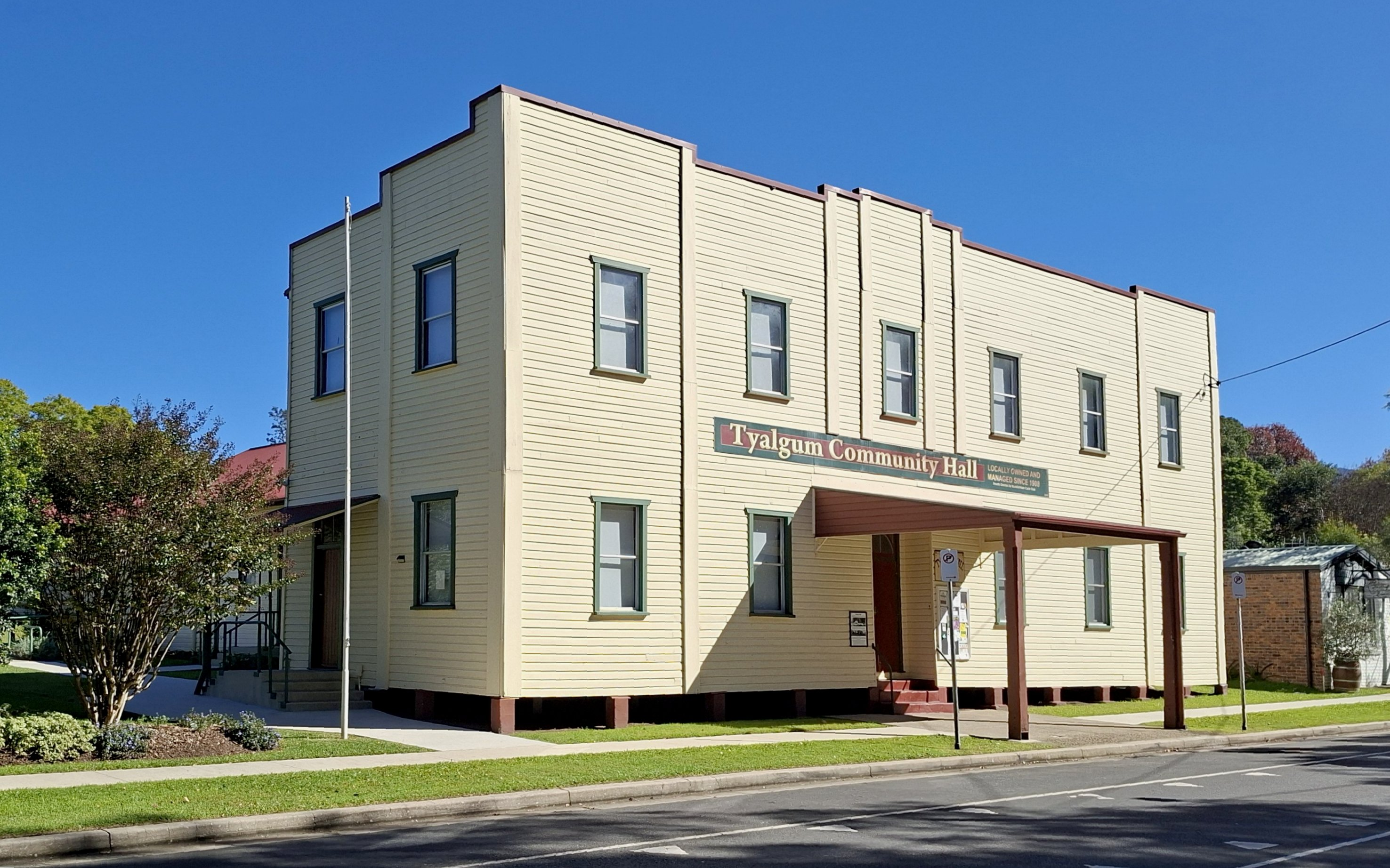
Tyalgum Hall, June 2026

Tyalgum (TAL-g'm or T'algum) is a rural village located in north-eastern New South Wales, Australia. At the time of the 2021 census, Tyalgum had a population of 521.

By road, Tyalgum is located approximately 26 kilometres (16 mi) west of Murwillumbah, 70 kilometres (43 mi) from the Gold Coast, and 130 kilometres (81 mi) from Brisbane.

The Ngandowal and Minyungbal speaking people of the Bundjalung people are the traditional owners of the Tweed region, including Tyalgum, and the surrounding areas.

== Origin of place name ==
The origin of the name Tyalgum comes from the Yugambeh–Bundjalung languages with there being numerous theories as to how it was derived. Some believe it to be derived from the word daldal (or dal dal), meaning 'shrub' and -gum meaning 'locality', and others that the word itself means 'tall timbers'.

It shares its name with the SS Tyalgum which was named after the village.

== Background ==
Tyalgum is situated at the junction of the Pumpenbil and Tyalgum creeks, which provide Tyalgum with its water supply. During early years of settlement, these waterways would have been used to transport the giant red cedar logs that were felled in the area. Other natural features include the valley environment around the village, created by the Border Ranges and Mount Warning. As forestry declined, the area became used for dairy farming and other cropping, the local dairy industry being the reason for the 1913 opening of a Norco butter processing plant ("Butter Factory") as with a number of similar villages and townships in the region. The Butter Factory ceased operation in 1947 but the building remains, located opposite the Tyalgum Hotel (originally the New State Hotel) and has been the site of various business ventures since then (see "external links").

The village has a number of significant early buildings which have led to its main street and associated buildings being declared a Heritage Conservation Area (HCA) by the Tweed Shire Council. The HCA "Statement of Significance" reads, among other statements:

Tyalgum is significant as an example of surviving early villages, important in being representative of the pattern of settlement in the Tweed region. The European settlement pattern typically originates with the cedar-cutters followed by dairying and crop farming settlers. ...

The village is significant aesthetically for its surviving early buildings. The provisional school (1906), the Tyalgum Hall (1908), the general store, the Literary and Mechanics Institute, the post office, bakery and butcher shop – all provide evidence of the Village of Tyalgum growing and servicing the greater community of Tyalgum in the early 20th century.

The Tyalgum Butter Factory (1913) provides specific evidence of the historical connection with the dairy industry that lead to the foundation of the Village. The building is an important representative example of both the industrial processes used in the dairy industry in 1913 and their application in the Tweed Valley.

Tyalgum is significant as a surviving example of a typical early villages, occurring on river banks and with spectacular views to Wollumbin/Mt Warning in the Tweed region. The village contains a collection of historic buildings set within an extraordinary landscape setting.

As of 2026, there are plans for Tyalgum to disconnect from the electricity grid and produce renewable power locally, primarily using solar power and battery storage. This project, known as the Tyalgum Energy Project, began in 2014 and is motivated by sustainability and for practical reasons. The practical considerations include that the village is at the end of the existing electricity grid which mean that they can be removed without disrupting energy supplies to surrounding communities and that, with socio-economic residents, its will allow residents to save significantly on electricity.

== Climate ==
Tyalgum has a temperate climate. It has a mean annual temperature of 18.9 °C (66.0 °F). The rainfall is generally high with an annual mean of 1,555.4 millimetres (61.24 in), most of which occurs during the summer months.

== Demographics ==
In the 2021 census, Tyalgum recorded a population of 521, 50% female and 50% male.

The median age of the Tyalgum population was 46 years old, above the national median of 38.

77.9% of people living in Tyalgum were born in Australia. Other top responses for country of birth were England (5.2%), New Zealand (2.1%), South Africa (1.2%), the United States of America (1.0%), and Germany (0.8%).

95.4% of people spoke only English at home; the next most common languages were 0.6% Punjabi, 0.6% German, 0.6% Mandarin, and 0.6% Thai.

== Music Festival ==
The Tyalgum Music Festival, originally the "Tyalgum Festival of Classical Music", was founded in c.1991 by concert violinists John Willison and Carmel Kaine who had recently moved into the area. (Note: What appears to be the founding concert, in December 1991, was credited to "The Limpinwood Ensemble" (being Willison and Kaine with some associates) plus a number of guest artists. The first use of the term "festival" possibly dates from the following year.) Over its existence, the Festival has played host to a range of nationally recognised classical perfomers; concerts take place in the Tyalgum Community Hall (originally the Tyalgum Literary Institute Hall), which has been praised for its good acoustics. In 2026 the Festival was looking forward to welcoming performing artists for its (stated) 34th year of operation.

== The Bakehouse Pottery and Galleria Artisans ==
The Bakehouse Pottery in Coolman Street, previously the village bakery and later, the "Bakehouse Pottery and Galleria Artisans", was operational from 1980 to 2001 under the ownership of noted Australian ceramic artist, teacher and lecturer Les Peterkin OA, who also served the community in several other capacities while resident in Tyalgum. Since Peterkin's departure, the premises are now the Flutterbies Cottage Café and businesses connected with it.

The Flutterbies Cottage Café, the General Store, and a number of other businesses in town are operated by Hermes Far Eastern Shining, a group that follow Gnostic science, and many of the teachings of Hermes Trismegistus. This group are frequently called "The Water People" and they have been active in the Tyalgum community since their move there in the 1990s. This group was led by former clinical psychologist Gerald Hart Attrill going by the name Jessa O’My Heart until his death in 2012.

== 2019 fire ==
In the early morning of 20 August 2019, fire destroyed three local businesses in Tyalgum's main street (Coolman Street) adjacent to the General Store, which was unharmed. The businesses, a local bookshop, jeweller, and boutique have since been re-established (two under new names) and relocated to buildings elsewhere in the street, including to the old Bank building plus La Markette Lane, a recently constructed cluster of artisan shops behind that building and Flutterbies Cottage Café, however the original building did not survive and is now an open space.

== Gallery ==
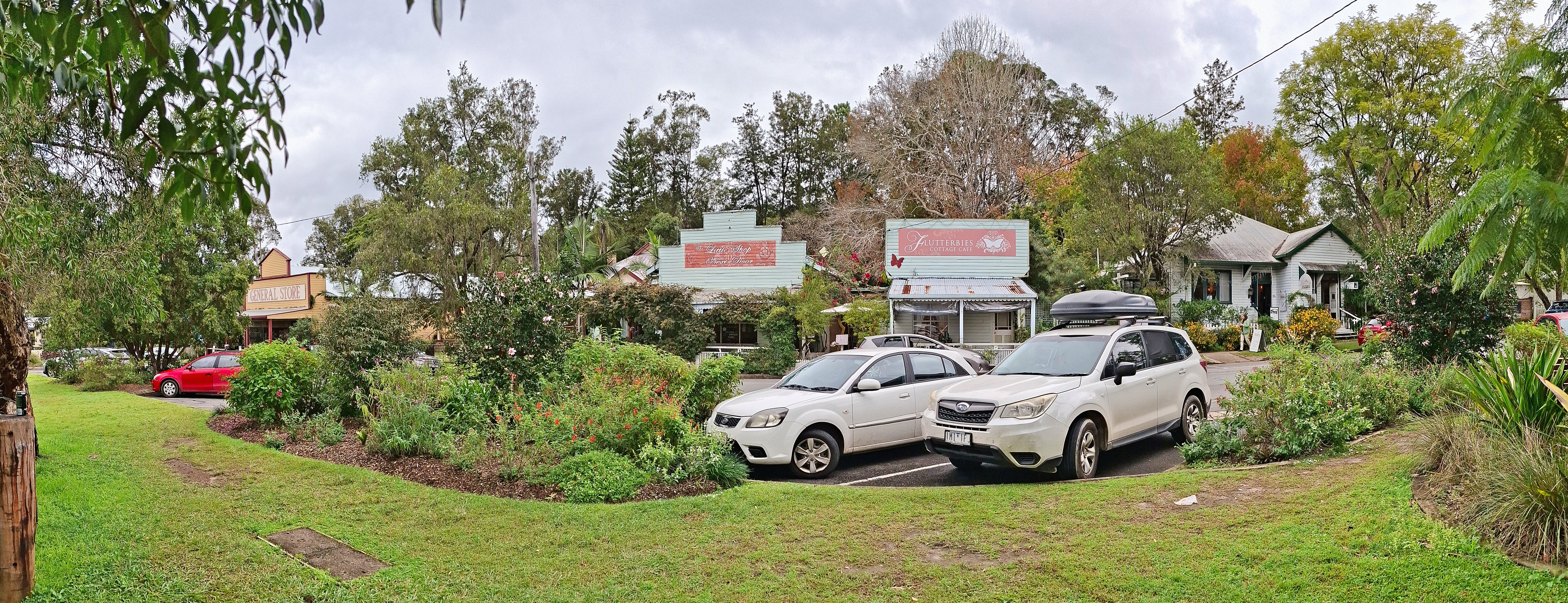
Tyalgum main street with shop frontages, June 2026

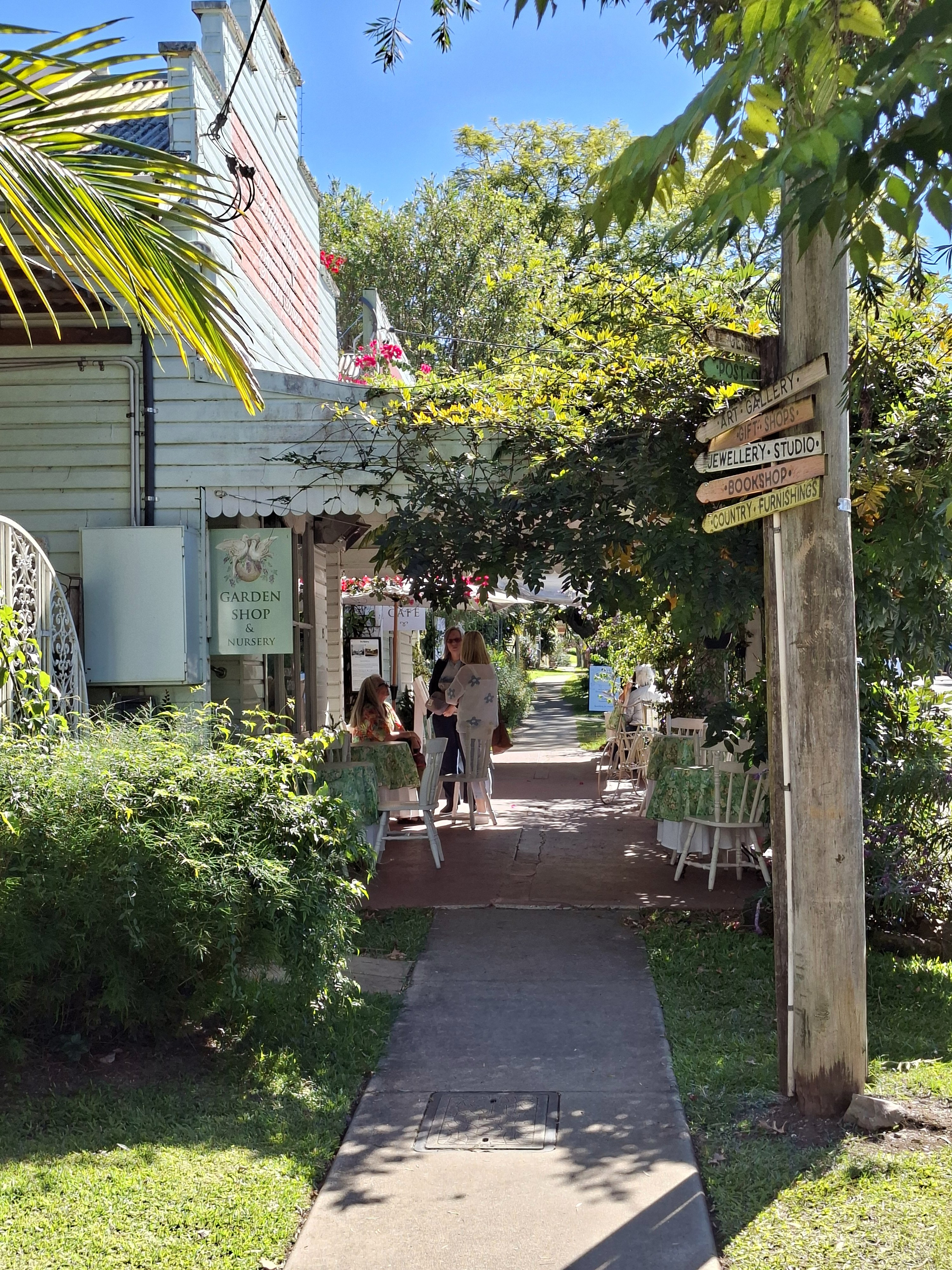
Tyalgum May 2026: street scene

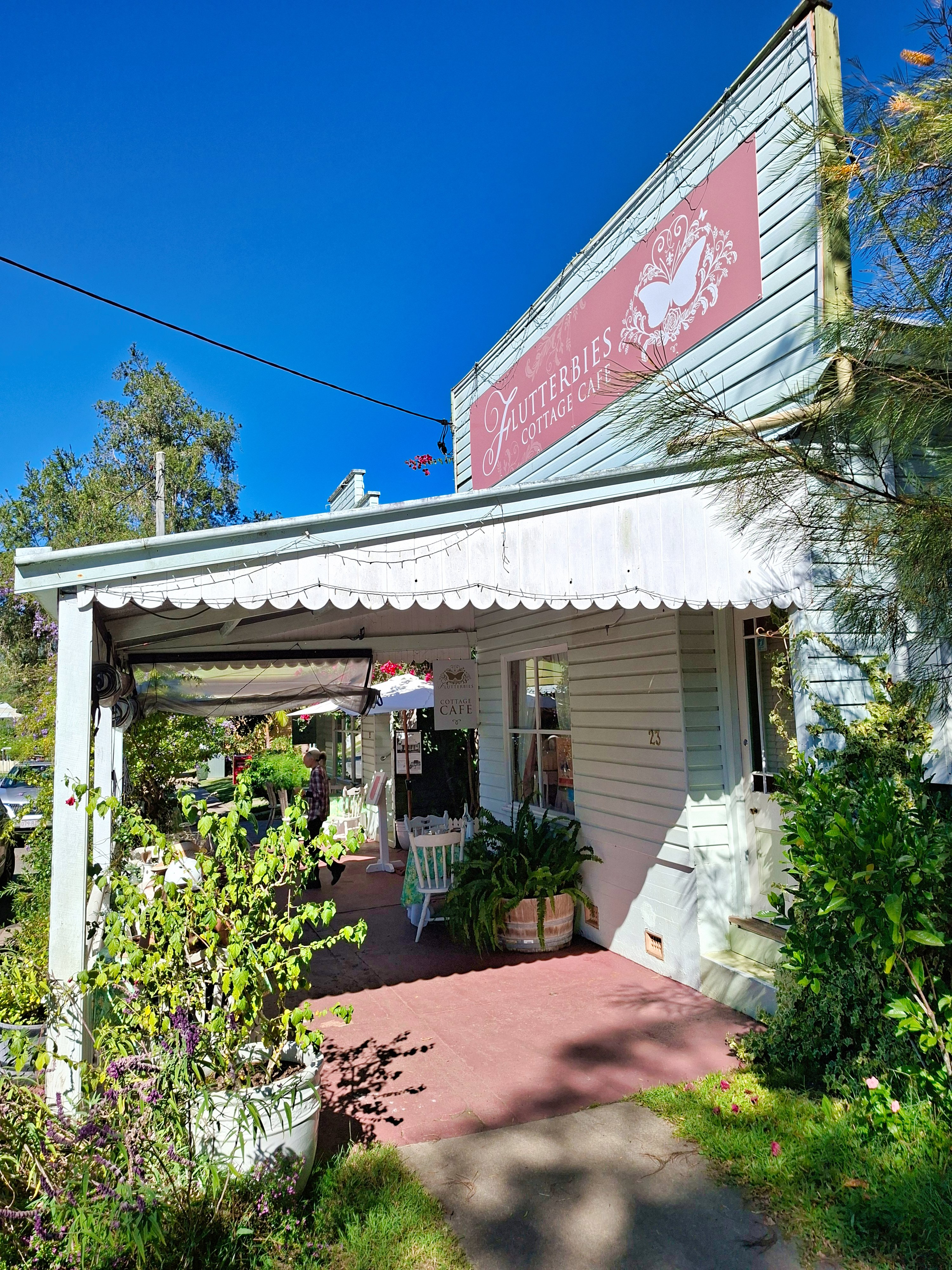
Tyalgum May 2026: street scene (2)

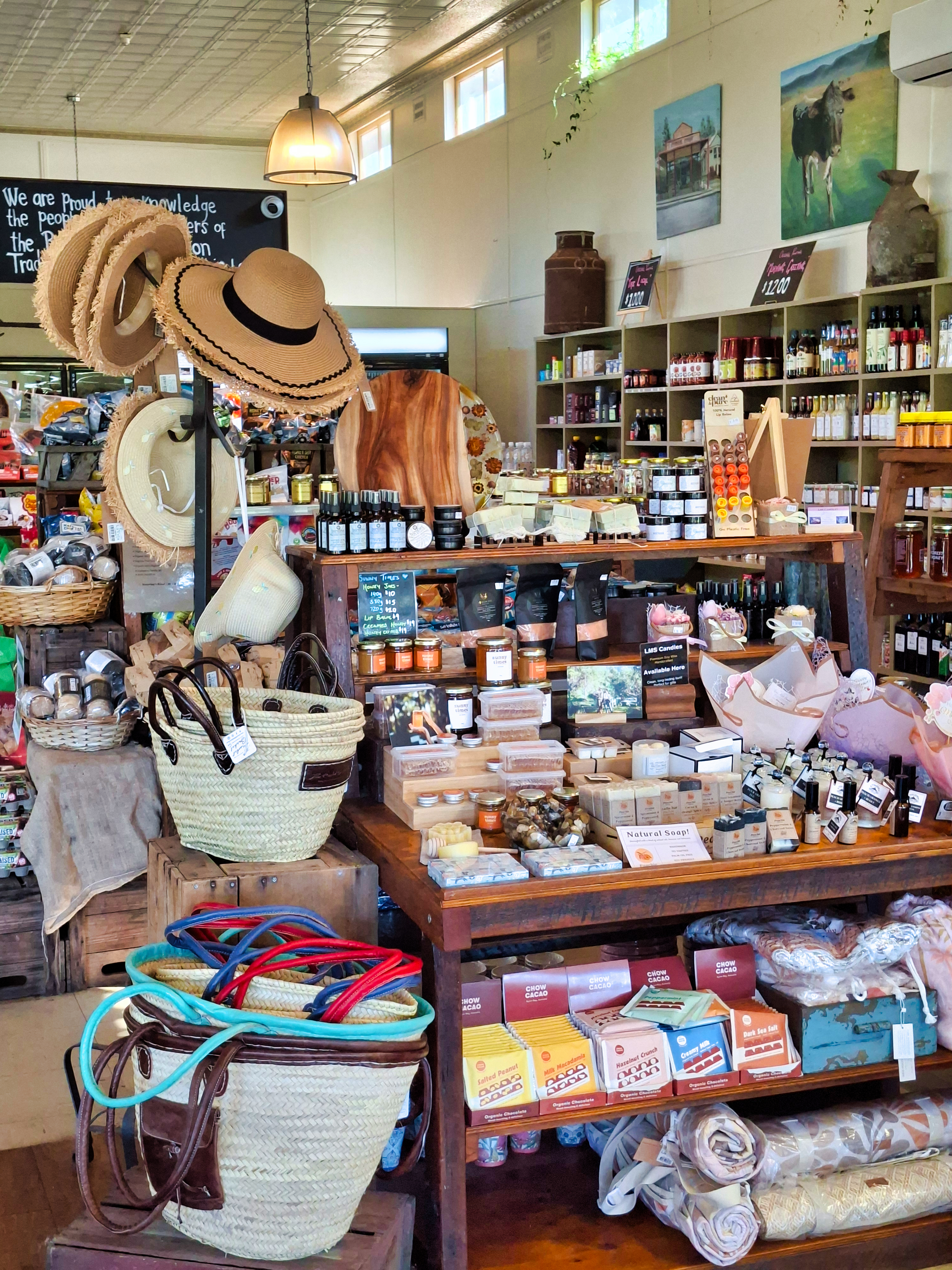
Tyalgum May 2026: General Store interior

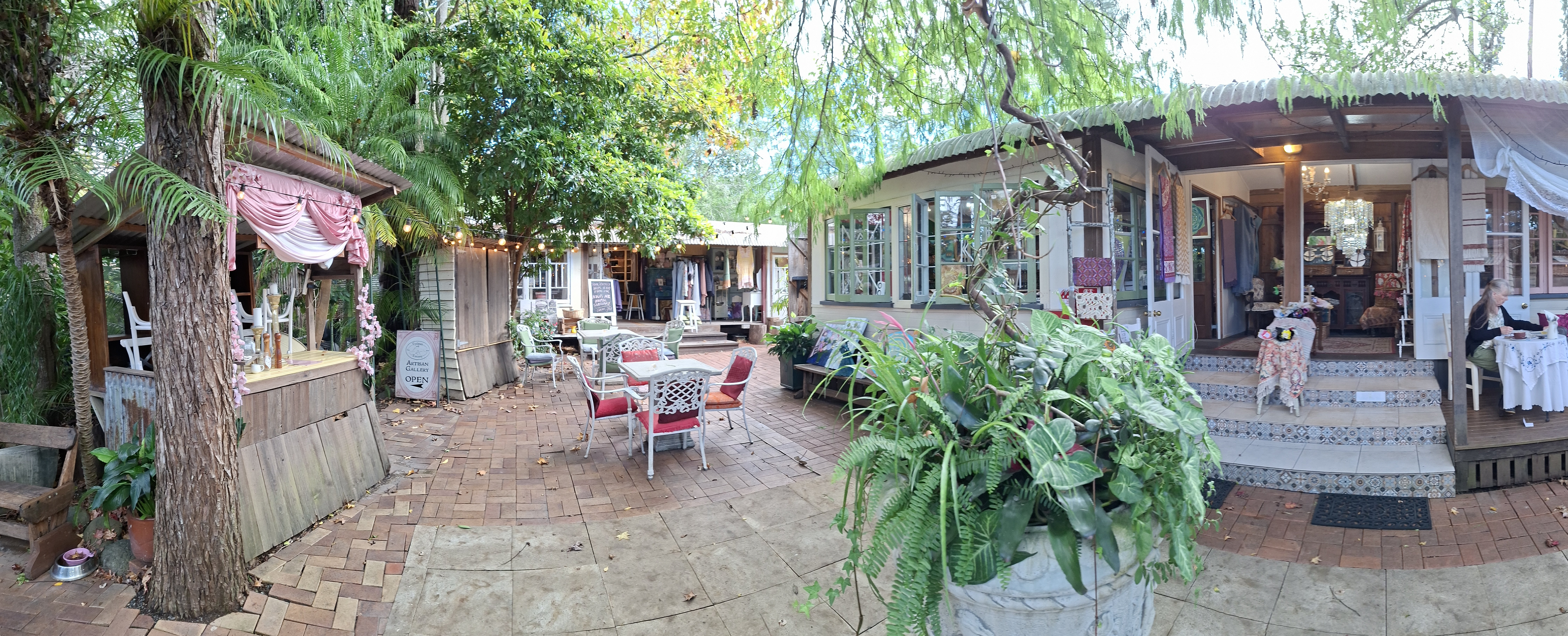
Tyalgum May 2026: La Markette Lane (1)

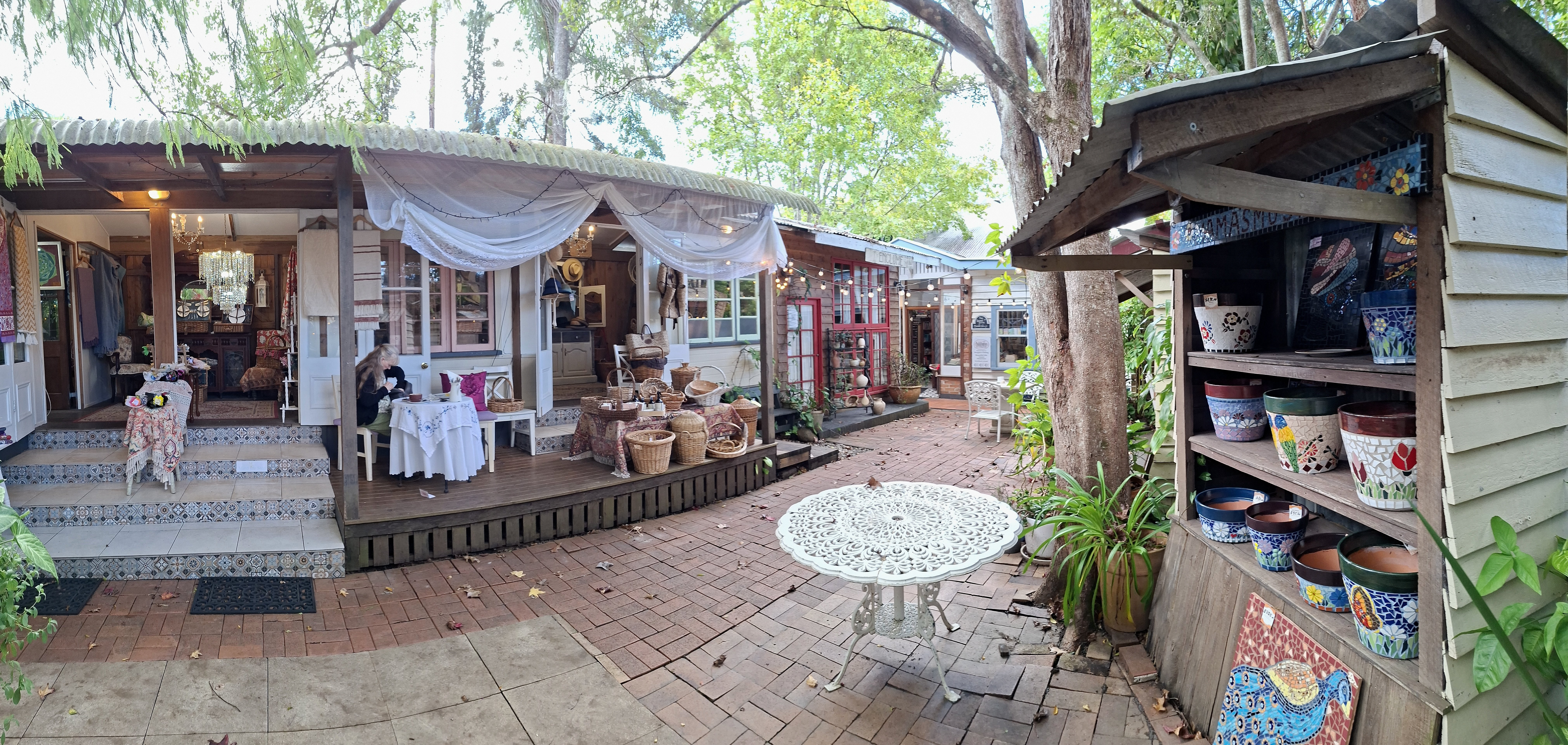
Tyalgum May 2026: La Markette Lane (2)

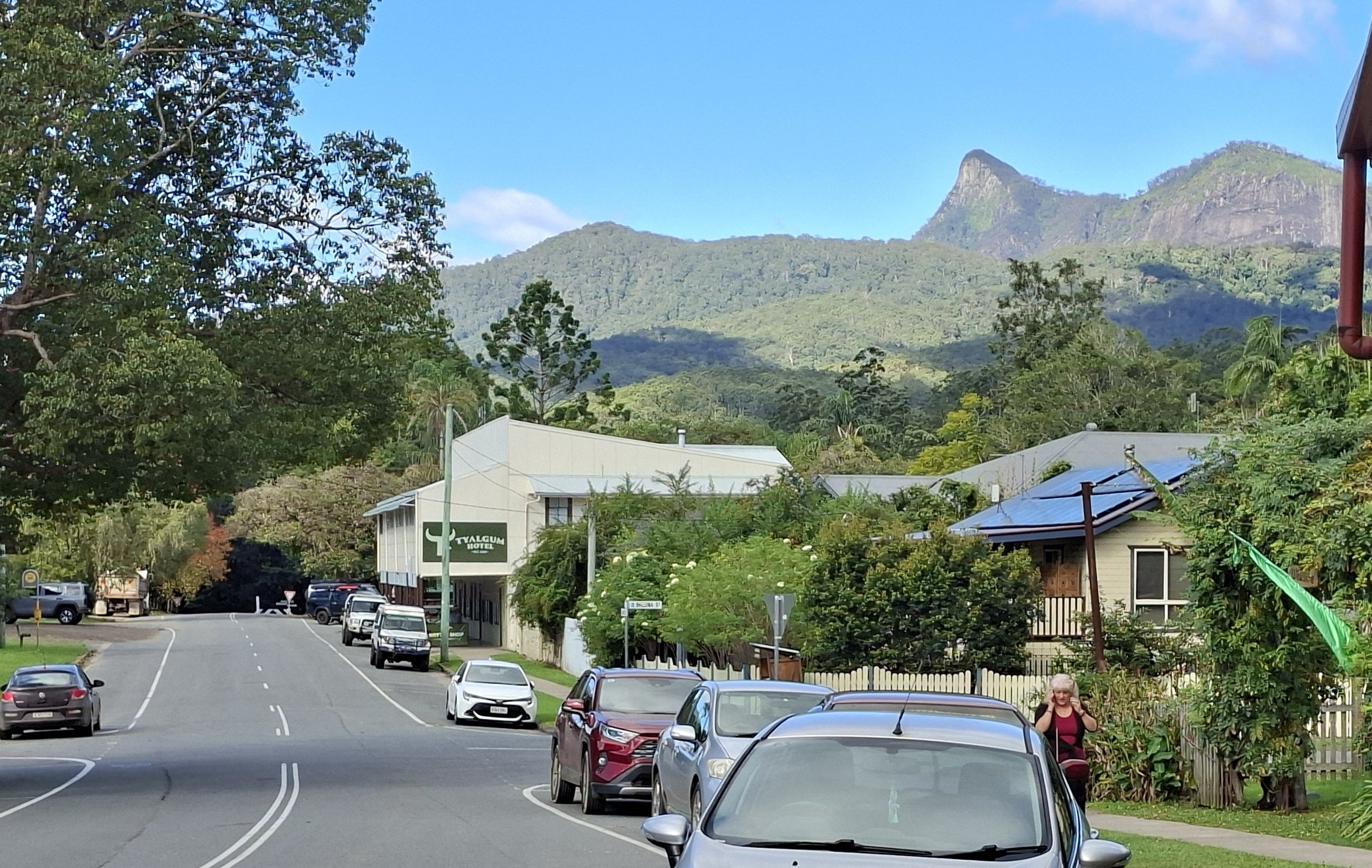
Tyalgum May 2026: Tyalgum Hotel with Mount Warning behind

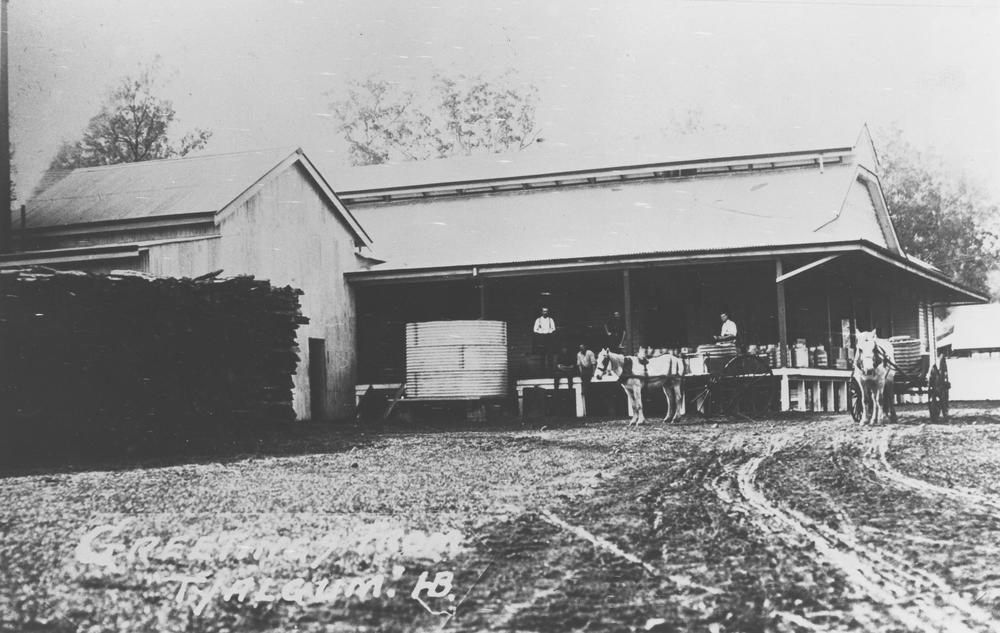
Norco Butter Factory at Tyalgum, 1918
