= Lamoureux =

Lamoureux is a surname of French origin. People with the name include:

- Abraham-César Lamoureux (c. 1640–1692), sculptor who worked in Sweden and Denmark
- Caro Lamoureux (1904–1998), Canadian soprano
- Claude Lamoureux (c. 1650–after 1699), sculptor in Sweden and Denmark; younger brother of Abraham-César Lamoureux
- Charles Lamoureux (1834–1899), founder of the Orchestre Lamoureux
- Cindy Lamoureux (born 1991), Canadian politician from Manitoba, MLA for Tyndall Park.
- Denis Lamoureux (contemporary), Canadian professor of science and religion
- Diane Lamoureux (born 1954), Canadian professor and writer
- François Lamoureux (1946–2006), French and European civil servant
- Gisèle Lamoureux (1942–2018), Québécoise photographer, botanist, and ecologist
- Jean-Philippe Lamoureux (born 1984), American professional ice hockey player; brother of Jocelyne and Monique
- Jocelyne Lamoureux (born 1989), American Olympic ice hockey player; twin sister of Monique, sister of Jean-Philippe
- Justin Lamoureux (born 1976), Canadian snowboarder
- Kevin Lamoureux (born 1962), Canadian politician from Manitoba, MP for Winnipeg North
- Leo Lamoureux (1916–1961), Canadian professional ice hockey player
- Lucie Lamoureux-Bruneau (1877–1951), Canadian philanthropist and a city councillor of Montreal
- Lucien Lamoureux (France) (1888–1970), French politician and government minister
- Lucien Lamoureux (1920–1998), Canadian politician from Ontario
- Mario Lamoureux (born 1988), American professional ice hockey player; brother of Jean-Philippe, Jocelyne and Monique
- Maveric Lamoureux(born 2004), Canadian professional ice hockey player
- Maurice Lamoureux (contemporary), Canadian politician from Ontario
- Michael Lamoureux (born 1976), lawyer, lobbyist, and former Republican politician from Russellville, Arkansas
- Mitch Lamoureux (born 1962), Canadian professional ice hockey player
- Monique Lamoureux-Kolls (born 1989), American Olympic ice hockey player; twin sister of Jocelyne, sister of Jean-Philippe
- Mylène Lamoureux (born 1986), Canadian ice dancer
- Natalie Lamoureux (contemporary), Canadian film editor
- Robert Lamoureux (1920–2011), French actor, screenwriter, and film director

== See also ==
- Lamoreaux, americanized surname
- Lamoureux, Alberta, a hamlet in Alberta, Canada
