= Suzanne Chaigneau =

French musician (1875–1946)

Suzanne Chaigneau (14 June 1875 – 13 April 1946) was a French violinist and chamber musician, and a noted violin teacher.

She spent her childhood between Barbizon and Paris, receiving her musical education from her mother and family friends including Charles Lamoureux and Camille Chevillard. With her sisters she formed a piano trio which gave its first concert in Paris on 25 February 1895.

She was the daughter of painter Ferdinand Chaigneau and Louise Deger, the twin sister of the cellist Marguerite and the sister of pianist Thérèse, with whom she played as the Trio Chaigneau. In 1910 she married the son of violinist Joseph Joachim, Hermann Joachim, an officer in the German army, and was the mother of the singer Irène Joachim. The Chaigneau home welcomed many artistic visitors and was also considered close to the Dreyfusard cause, with Georges Picquart among other visitors to the home.

The Trio Chaigneau played in London and Edinburgh and, with assistance from Joachim, undertook a tour of Germany in 1905. Their repertoire was both the Austro-German classics – Beethoven, Brahms, Mozart – and modern French composers. Apart from a few appearances in 1920, the Trio ended at the start of the First World War.

Suzanne Chaigneau was stranded in Berlin during the war, and her husband died of tuberculosis in 1917. However she was able to continue with musical activity which brought her into contact with Wanda Landowska and Carl Flesch. Although she was able to send her daughter back to France in 1918, she herself was only able to return around 1920. Back in Paris she taught the violin, and founded the Institut moderne du violon with Lucien Capet in 1924. She also became a music correspondent for the Berliner Tageblatt, signing her articles as 'S Francoeur'.

In 1926 and 1927 Chaigneau spent time in Chicago with the Yanker family to teach her violin method. Her books on violin playing included L’Art d’etudier, as well as a translation of the Journal Intime of Novalis.
