= Maurice Hewitt =

French violinist and conductor

Maurice Hewitt (6 October 1884 – 7 November 1971) was a French violinist and conductor, as well as a member of the French Resistance during World War II.

== Life ==
Born in Asnières-sur-Seine, Hewitt studied the violin at the Conservatoire de Paris. From 1914, he was a member of the ensemble Société des Instruments anciens, from 1909 to 1930 a member of the Capet Quartet, which was particularly dedicated to the interpretation of Beethoven's string quartets. From 1930 to 1943 he led his own quartet, and in 1941 he founded the Orchestre de Chambre Hewitt.

He also founded the record company Les Discophiles Français. Here he released six albums until 1942, including the first recording of Jean-Philippe Rameaus Six Concerts en Sextuor. On further albums he released e.g. Mozart's Clarinet Concerto KV 622 (with François Étienne), François Couperin's L'Impériale and L'Apothéose de Lulli and Mozart's String Trios with the Trio Pasquier (Jean Pasquier, violin, Pierre Pasquier, viola and Étienne Pasquier, cello).

From 1940 Hewitt was active in the Resistance, where he belonged to Colonel Maurice Buckmaster's network. In November 1943 he was denounced and arrested and held in Fresnes and Compiègne, then in 1944 deported to the Buchenwald Concentration Camp, arriving on 29 January (prison number 44007). There he founded an illegal string quartet with Czech inmates. He was repatriated on 18 April 1945.

On 2 November 1945, he conducted Fauré's Requiem at an event held at the Palais de Chaillot, 'In memoriam: concert in memory of political deportees who died for France', by the Orchestre national et choeurs de la Radiodiffusion Française (dir. Manuel Rosenthal, except for the Fauré).

Hewitt was active as a conductor and music teacher until the 1950s.

He died in Créteil in 1971.

== Bibliography ==
- Konzentrationslager Buchenwald 1937-1945. Begleitband zur ständigen historischen Ausstellung. published by the memorial Buchenwald, Göttingen 1999, ISBN 9783892442226
