= Ivan Galamian =

Armenian-American violin teacher

- Galamian, circa 1930s
- Born: Ivan Alexander Galamian; January 23, 1903 O.S. Tabriz, Iran
- Died: April 14, 1981 (aged 78); New York City, U.S.
- Education: Moscow School of Philharmonic Society
- Occupations: Violinist, teacher
- Years active: 1924–1981
- Known for: Teaching at Juilliard, Meadowmount School of Music
- Spouse: Judith Johnson

Ivan Alexander Galamian (Armenian: Իվան Ղալամեան; 5 February [O.S. 23 January] 1903 – April 14, 1981) was an Armenian-American violin teacher of the twentieth century who was the violin teacher of many seminal violin players including Itzhak Perlman and Kyung Wha Chung.

== Biography ==
Galamian was born in Tabriz, Iran to an Armenian family. Soon after his birth, the family immigrated to Moscow, Russia. He studied with Konstantin Mostras (a student of Leopold Auer) at the School of the Philharmonic Society from 1916 to 1922. He was jailed at age fifteen by the Bolshevik government. The opera manager at the Bolshoi Theatre rescued Galamian; the manager argued that Galamian was a necessary part of the opera orchestra, and subsequently the government released him. Soon thereafter he moved to Paris and studied under Lucien Capet in 1922 and 1923. In 1924 he debuted in Paris. Due to a combination of nerves, health, and a fondness for teaching, Galamian eventually gave up the stage in order to teach full-time. He became a faculty member at the Conservatoire Rachmaninoff where he taught from 1925 to 1929. His earliest pupils in Paris include Veda Reynolds, the first woman in Philadelphia Orchestra's first-violin section, and Paul Makanowitzky.

In 1937 Galamian moved permanently to the United States. In 1941 he married Judith Johnson in New York City. He taught violin at the Curtis Institute of Music beginning in 1944, and became the head of the violin department at the Juilliard School in 1946. He wrote two violin method books, Principles of Violin Playing and Teaching (1962) and Contemporary Violin Technique (1962). Galamian incorporated aspects of both the Russian and French schools of violin technique in his approach. In 1944 he founded the Meadowmount School of Music, a summer program in Westport, New York. The school has remained operational and has trained thousands of world-class musicians. Galamian taught concurrently at Curtis, Juilliard, and Meadowmount schools. He did not retire and maintained an active full-time work schedule. He died at the age of 78 in 1981 in New York City. His wife subsequently took on an active role in managing the Meadowmount School.

Galamian's most notable teaching assistants — later distinguished teachers in their own right — were Margaret Pardee, Dorothy DeLay, Sally Thomas, Pauline Scott, Robert Lipsett, Lewis Kaplan, David Cerone, and Elaine Richey.

Galamian held honorary degrees from the Curtis Institute of Music, Oberlin College, and the Cleveland Institute of Music. He was an honorary member of the Royal Academy of Music, London.

== Notable pupils ==
- Charles Avsharian
- Michael Avsharian
- Ik-Hwan Bae
- William Barbini
- Vera Beths
- Serge Blanc (violinist)
- Anker Buch
- Robert Canetti
- Stuart Canin
- Jonathan Carney
- José Francisco del Castillo
- Charles Castleman
- Joseph V. Chen
- Kyung Wha Chung
- Dorothy DeLay
- Glenn Dicterow
- Philippe Djokic
- Eugene Fodor
- Miriam Fried
- Erick Friedman
- Gregory Fulkerson
- Joseph Genualdi
- Shirley Givens
- Betty-Jean Hagen
- Heimo Haitto
- Daniel Heifetz
- Ulf Hoelscher
- Carmel Kaine
- Dong-Suk Kang
- Martha Strongin Katz
- Ani Kavafian
- Ida Kavafian
- Chin Kim
- Young Uck Kim
- Aaron Krosnick
- Helen Kwalwasser
- Fredell Lack
- Jaime Laredo
- Isidor Lateiner
- Sung-Ju Lee
- Sergiu Luca
- Malcolm Lowe
- Vartan Manoogian
- Gil Morgenstern
- David Nadien
- Sally O'Reilly
- Margaret Pardee
- Itzhak Perlman
- Michael Rabin
- Gerardo Ribeiro
- Eugene Sârbu
- Berl Senofsky
- Simon Shaheen
- Simon Standage
- Arnold Steinhardt
- Albert Stern
- Michel Tagrine
- Arve Tellefsen
- Sally Thomas
- Gwen Thompson
- Andor Toth
- Charles Treger
- Ismael Vazquez
- Robert Vernon (musician)
- Donald Weilerstein
- Rebekah Yoon
- Pinchas Zukerman

== Edited works ==
- Bach, Concerto No. 1 (A minor). New York: International Music Company, 1960.
- Bach, Concerto No. 1 (D minor). New York: International Music Company, 1960.
- Bach, Concerto No. 2 (E major). New York: International Music Company, 1960.
- Bach, Six Sonatas and Partitas for Solo Violin. New York: International Music Company, 1971. (Includes facsimile of the original)
- Brahms, Sonatas, Op. 78, 100, 108. New York: International Music Company.
- Bruch, Scottish Fantasy, Op. 46. New York: International Music Company, 1975.
- Conus, Concerto in E minor. New York: International Music Company, 1976.
- Dont, Twenty-four Etudes and Caprices, Op. 35. New York: International Music Company, 1968.
- Dont, Twenty-four Exercises, Op. 37. New York: International Music Company, 1967.
- Dvořák, Concerto in A minor, Op. 53. New York: International Music Company, 1975.
- Fiorillo, Thirty-six Studies or Caprices. New York: International Music Company, 1964.
- Galaxy Music Company, 1963 and 1966.
- Gaviniés, Twenty-four Studies. New York: International Music Company, 1963.
- Kreutzer, Forty-two Etudes. New York: International Music Company, 1963.
- Mazas, Etudes Speciales, Op. 36 Part 1. New York: International Music Company, 1964.
- Mazas, Etudes Brilliantes, Op. 36 Part 2. New York: International Music Company, 1972.
- Paganini, Twenty-four Caprices. New York: International Music Company, 1973.
- Rode, Twenty-four Caprices. New York: International Music Company, 1962.
- Saint-Saëns, Caprice, Op. 52, No. 6. New York: International Music Company.
- Sinding, Suite in A minor, Op. 10. New York: International Music Company, 1970.
- Tchaikovsky, Three Pieces, Op. 42. New York: International Music Company, 1977.
- Vivaldi, Concerto in A minor. New York: International Music Company, 1956.
- Vivaldi, Concerto in G minor, Op. 12, No. 1. New York: International Music Company, 1973.
- Vivaldi, Concerto for Two Violins in D minor, Op. 3, No. 11. New York: International Music Company, 1964.
- Vivaldi, Concerto for Two Violins in A minor. Piccioli-Galamian, New York: International Music Company, 1956.
- Vieuxtemps, Concerto No. 5 in A minor, Op. 37, New York: International Music Company, 1957.
- Wieniawski, Concerto No. 2 in D minor, Op. 22. New York: International Music Company, 1957.
- Wieniawski, Ecole Moderne, Op. 10. New York: International Music Company, 1973.

== Publications ==
- Ivan Galamian; Frederick Neumann (1966). Contemporary Violin Technique, Volume 1. Galaxy Music Corp.
- Ivan Galamian; Frederick Neumann (1966). Contemporary Violin Technique, Volume 2. Galaxy Music Corp.
- Ivan Galamian; Elisabeth Green (1964). Principles of Violin Playing and Teaching. Faber & Faber.

The book principles of violin playing and teaching is translated to several languages in the world. Chinese version is done by Professor Peter Shi-xiang Zhang, Spanish by Renato Zanettovich, Persian by Dr. Mohsen Kazemian.
