= Louis Hasselmans =

French conductor and cellist (1878–1957)

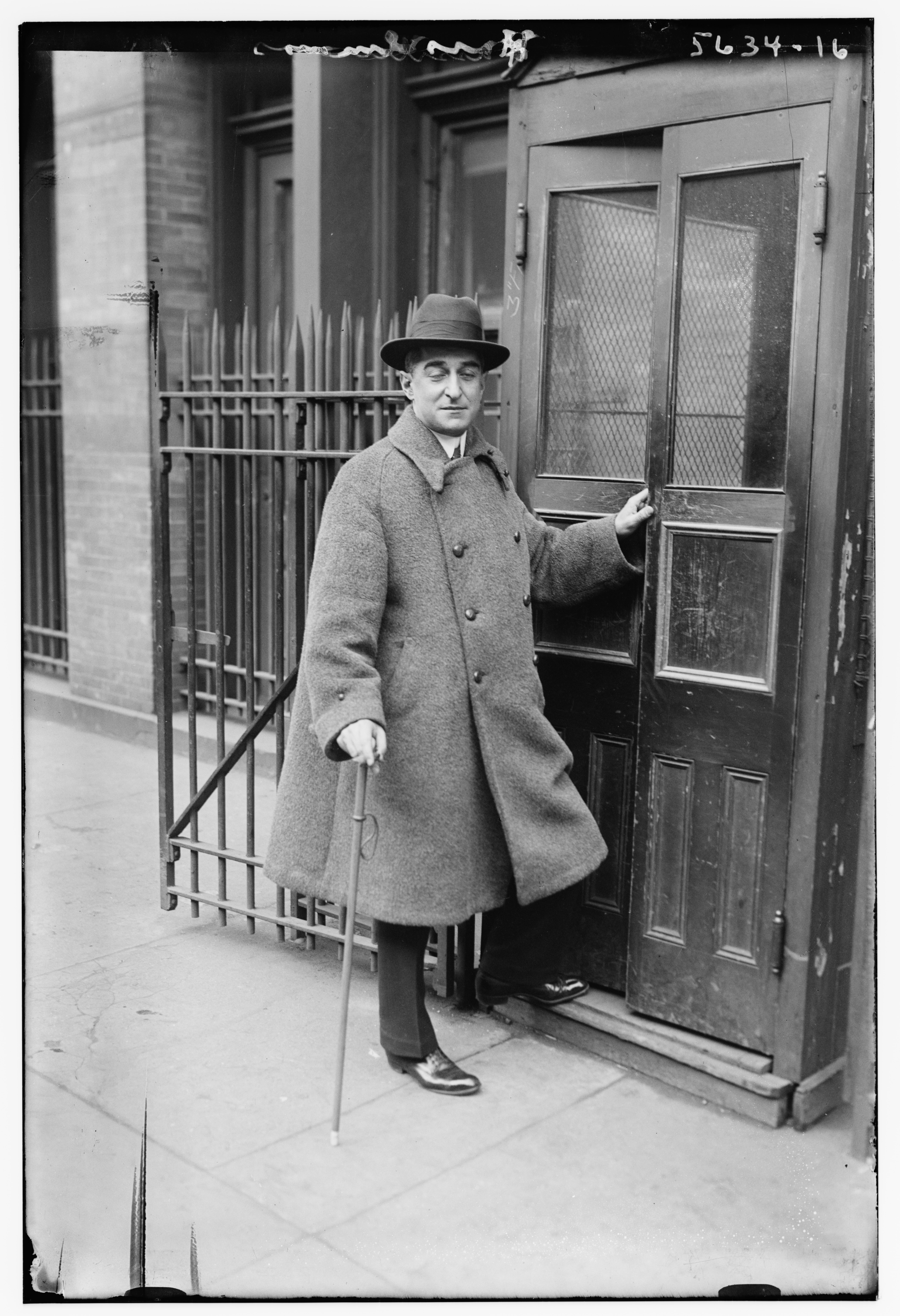
- Born: 25 July 1878; Paris
- Died: 27 December 1957 (aged 79); San Juan, Puerto Rico
- Occupations: Cellist, conductor, music educator
- Spouse: Minnie Egener

Louis Hasselmans (25 July 1878 – 27 December 1957) was a French cellist and conductor.

== Biography ==
The son of harpist Alphonse Hasselmans, Louis Hasselmans studied the cello with Jules Desart at the Conservatoire de Paris. He obtained a First prize in 1893. He worked with Albert Lavignac, Benjamin Godard and Jules Massenet.

Between 1904 and 1909, he was a member of the Capet Quartet. He made his debut as a conductor with the Orchestre Lamoureux. He latter conducted the Opéra-Comique (1909–1911, 1919–1922), the Montreal orchestra, the "Concerts classiques de Marseille" (1911–1913) and the Civic Opera House of Chicago (1918–1919). Called by Castelbon de Beauxhostes, under the advice of Camille Saint-Saëns, he conducted Parysatis and Héliogabale at the Théâtre des Arènes in Béziers in 1902 and 1910. From 1921 to 1936, he conducted the Metropolitan Opera of New York. From 1936 to 1948, he taught at the School of Music at Louisiana State University.

Louis Hasselmans was the dedicatee of the Cello Sonata No. 1 by Gabriel Fauré.

Louis Hasselmans married the American mezzo-soprano Minnie Egener (1881–1938).

== Bibliography ==
- Baker, Theodore; Slonimsky, Nicolas (1995). Dictionnaire biographique des musiciens; Baker's Biographical Dictionary of Musicians (in French). Vol. 2. Translated by Marie-Stella Pâris. Paris: Éditions Robert Laffont. p. 1693. ISBN 2-221-06787-8.
