= Lucie Lamoureux-Bruneau =

Lucie Lamoureux-Bruneau (1877–1951) was a philanthropist and a City Councillor in Montreal, Quebec.

== Background ==
She was born in Montreal in 1877 and was married to Théodule Bruneau, a surgeon. She was instrumental in getting mental health institutions established. She was a co-founder of the Centre hospitalier universitaire Sainte-Justine (Sainte-Justine University Health Center) in 1907. In 1926, thanks to her effort, the Ecole des enfants infirmes, a school for poor and disabled children, opened in 1926.

== City Councillor ==
She was chosen by home owners to serve on the City Council and was in office from 1940 to 1942.

== Death ==
She died in Montreal in 1951.
