= Lucien Capet =

French violinist (1873–1928)

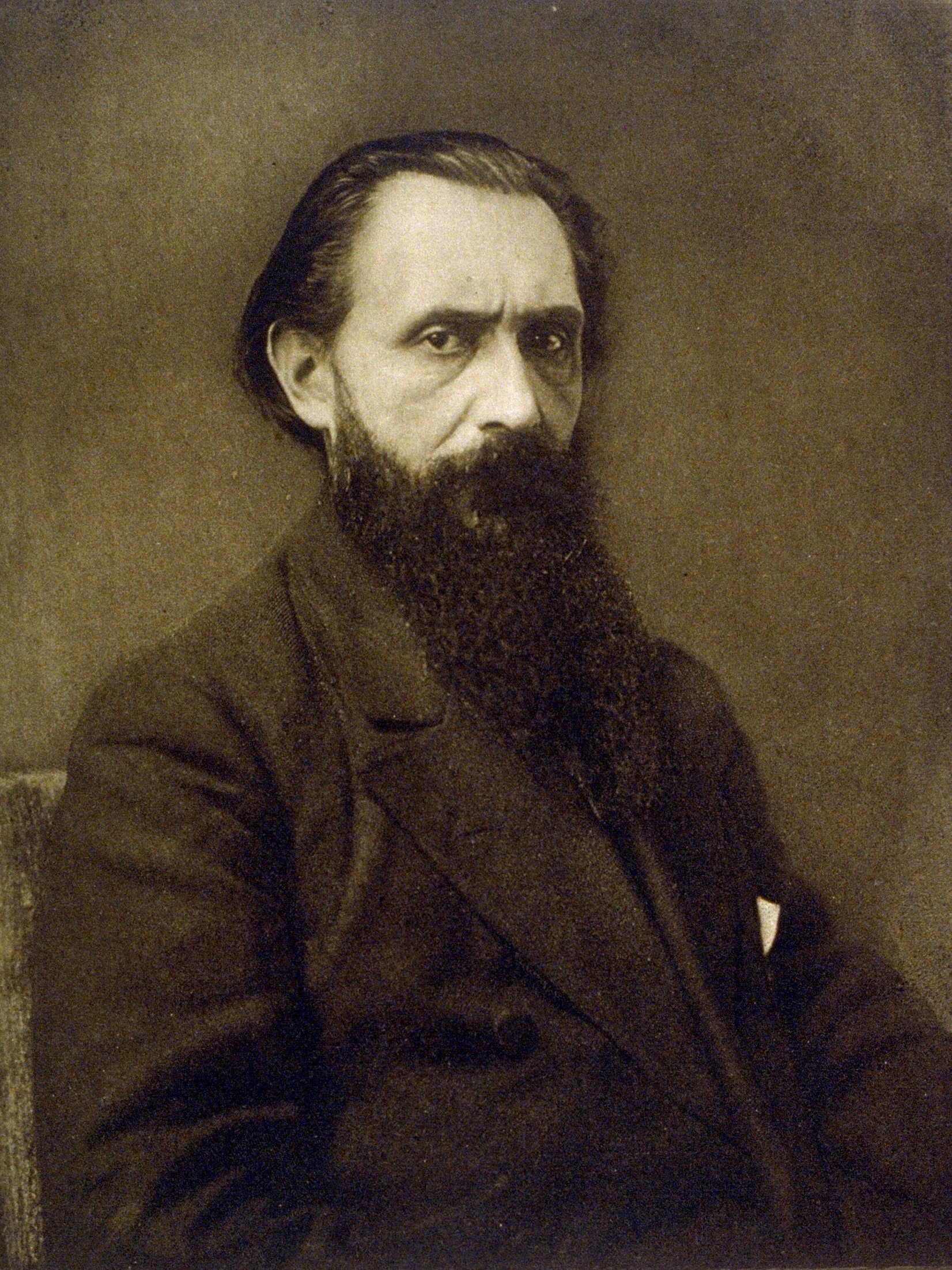

Background information
- Born: 8 January 1873; Paris, France
- Died: 18 December 1928 (aged 55) Paris, France
- Genre: Classical
- Occupations: Pedagogue, Violinist, Composer
- Instrument: Violin
- Years active: 1887–1928

Lucien Louis Capet (French: [lysjɛ̃ kapɛ]; 8 January 1873 – 18 December 1928) was a French violinist, pedagogue and composer.

== Career ==
Capet came from the Paris proletariat. By the age of fifteen, he had to maintain himself by playing in bistros and cafes. He studied at the Conservatoire de Paris where he was a pupil of Jean-Pierre Maurin and later appeared as soloist with French orchestras. Between 1896 and 1899, he was the concertmaster of the orchestra of the Concerts Lamoureux. He also taught violin at the Société Sainte-Cécile de Bordeaux (1899–1903). His notable students include Jascha Brodsky and Ivan Galamian, both of whom became influential violin teachers of the latter part of the twentieth century.

Lucien Capet had a successful career as a soloist and chamber musician, forming the Capet Quartet in 1893. The quartet went through many changes of personnel and made several recordings of Beethoven string quartets and Romantic and Classical works. Capet was also a well-regarded teacher, known especially for his bow technique.

With the violinist and chamber musician Suzanne Chaigneau, Capet founded the Institut moderne du violin in 1924.

Capet wrote a book on "Superior Bowing Technique" which is an essential treatise on all aspects of bowing technique for the violin; reprints are available (including translations into English by Margaret Schmidt and Stephen Shipps, and into Persian by Mohsen Kazemian).

Lucien Capet also worked closely with bowmaker Joseph Arthur Vigneron to develop a Lucien Capet model bow (modele Lucien Capet was often stamped on such bows). Vigneron's concept/design for these bows was a sort of rounded triangular cross section, which added stability to the bow (lower centre of gravity)."

== Quotes ==
Mr. Capet is a Master performer on the violin with a wonderful technique and a warm and powerful tone.

— Alberto Bachmann, 1925.

== Selected compositions ==
- Le Rouet, symphonic poem
- Prélude religieux, for orchestra
- Devant la mer, for voice and orchestra
- Poème, for violin and orchestra
- 5 string quartets
- 2 sonatas for violin and piano
- 6 études for violin
- Aria in A minor for violin, viola and piano, Op. 5 (1908)

== Recordings by the Quatuor Capet ==
(Made c.1925-1930)

- Beethoven: Quartet in A major, Op. 18 No. 5 (Columbia Records, D 1659-62).
- Beethoven: Quartet in F major, Op. 59 No. 1 (Col. D 15065-70).
- Beethoven: Quartet in E-flat major 'Harp', Op. 74 (Col., L 2248-51).
- Beethoven: Quartet in C-sharp minor, Op. 131 (Col., L 2283-87).
- Beethoven: Quartet in A minor, Op. 132 (Col., L 2272-76).
- Mozart: Quartet in C major, K. 465 (Col., L 2290-93).
- Schumann: Quartet in A minor, Op. 41 No. 1 (Col., L 2329-31).
- Debussy: Quartet in G minor, Op. 10 (1893) (Col., D 15085-8).
- Franck: Quintet in F minor, with Marcel Ciampi (pno) (Col., D 15102-6).
- Haydn: Quartet in D major, Op. 64 No. 5 'Lark' (Col., D 13070-2).
- Ravel: Quartet in F major (Col., D 15057-60).
- Schubert: Quartet in D minor, D. 810 'Death and the Maiden' (Col. D 15053-6).

== Sources ==
- A. Eaglefield-Hull, A Dictionary of Modern Music and Musicians (London: Dent, 1924)
- L. Capet, Technique de l'Archet
- R.D. Darrell, The Gramophone Shop Encyclopedia of Recorded Music (New York, 1936)
- Memoirs of Carl Flesch
- Alberto Bachmann, Encyclopedia of the Violin
