= Meadowmount School of Music =

Music festival in the United States

Coordinates: 44.2618°N 73.5282°W

- Founded: 1944
- Type: Classical music
- Purpose: classical music festival, education
- Location: Westport, New York, USA
- Website: meadowmount.org

The Meadowmount School of Music is a classical music summer program held each year in Westport, New York.

The program is known for its notable faculty, intensive practice schedule, chamber music involvement, and performance opportunities. Founded in 1944, the seven-week summer session includes more than 50 events, including student concerts, faculty performances, master classes, lectures, and guest artist appearances.

As a training ground for both young and established classical musicians, the Meadowmount School of Music brings more than 180 students, ages 10 to 30, from across the globe to live and study on the 240-acre campus. While amongst the Adirondack Mountains, students participate in focused solo practice, lessons, chamber music rehearsals, master classes, and public performances, both on the Meadowmount campus and throughout local venues.

The organization is currently led by Executive Director Genevieve Twomey and Artistic Director Janet Sung.

== History ==
The Meadowmount School of Music was founded in 1944 by renowned pedagogue and violinist Ivan Galamian. Born in Iran in 1903 to Armenian parents, Galamian was taken shortly thereafter to Moscow, Russia. Then in 1922, due to the rise of the Communist regime, Galamian emigrated to Paris where he began taking lessons with Lucien Capet and gaining a reputation as both performer and master teacher. However, over time the political situation in Europe had worsened to the degree that Galamian decided to emigrate to the United States in 1937 and settled in Manhattan, where he would establish his violin studio.

Gregor Piatigorsky, a celebrated Russian cellist and friend of Galamian, invited him to a party in Elizabethtown, New York in the Adirondack mountains where Piatigorsky had settled. Galamian fell in love with the area, and during the summer of 1944, Galamian invited 30 students to study with him at a house that he leased in Elizabethtown. That same summer, Galamian found a lodge built by an inventor named John Milholland, one of the creators of the pneumatic tube, outside the community of Lewis, New York. The Galamians purchased the property with the support of Edward Lee Campe, a wealthy manufacturer of men’s clothing that they had met at a party, and the Meadowmount School officially began.

Among the very first guest artists were cellist Gregor Piatigorsky and violinists Joseph Szigeti, Zino Francescatti and Isaac Stern. Early faculty included Sally Thomas, Galamian’s teaching assistant for many years, who joined the faculty in 1960 and served as the Co-director and administrator of student life for many years, as well as Vice-President of the Board of Directors of the Society for Strings. Thomas taught alongside other renowned faculty such as Dorothy DeLay, Leonard Rose, and Josef Gingold. Gingold originally visited Meadowmount with no intention of teaching there, but after conversing with Galamian, he would end up coming back each summer for over 25 years to teach chamber music. In 1958, Itzhak Perlman came to the United States to study at the Juilliard School and Meadowmount with Galamian and DeLay. A few years later, Perlman was proposed to backstage at Meadowmount by his now wife, Toby Perlman, after his performance.

== The Gurrena Fellowship ==
The Gurrena Fellowship was first established in 2022 by Linda Gurrena Barnebl, in memory of her late husband, David A. Barnebl. Valued at $50,000, these Fellowships are awarded annually to exceptionally talented students who have attended Meadowmount to support the establishment of their careers.

=== Past Gurrena Fellowship Recipients ===
- 2023: Sydney Lee, cello
- 2024: Luiz Fernando Venturelli, cello
- 2025: Kento Hong, violin
- 2026: Hiu Sing Fan, violin

== Facilities ==
The Meadowmount School of Music campus is 240 acres and the home to 49 buildings which include dorms, faculty studios, pianist spaces, practice cabins, a recreation center, a cafeteria, a main office, and two performance spaces. Initially owned by the Millholland family, the land was slowly purchased over time by Galamian as the camp expanded and accepted more students.

The 400-seat Edward Lee and Jean Campe Concert Hall is the main concert hall where all performances take place. It is made of white pine, an idea that Galamian had to create a beautiful acoustic, as the construction of the top of the violin is also typically pine. The name of the hall is dedicated to Edward Lee Campe and his wife Jean, who had given Meadowmount its interest-free mortgage and funded the concert hall as a gift to the school.

The Sally Thomas Recreation Center is a building that contains a recreation room, a large chamber music room, and four smaller practice rooms. The building was launched in 2018 to honor Sally Thomas’ legacy.

The Josef Gingold Library is a chamber music studio located in the Main House, and it was restored to its original form in 2025. The space was reinstated as a chamber music room to honor the legacy and memory of Josef Gingold teaching chamber music in that very space, years earlier.

== See also ==
- List of classical music festivals
- List of summer camps
