= Alice Guszalewicz =

Hungarian dramatic soprano

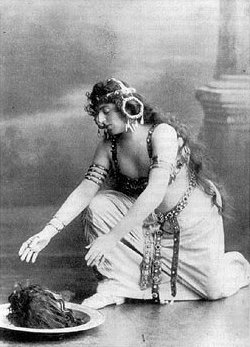
Alice Guszalewicz as Salome. For many years, this photo was thought to be of Oscar Wilde himself in costume.

Alice Guszalewicz (21 September 1879 – 26 October 1940) was a Hungarian dramatic soprano.

== Biography ==
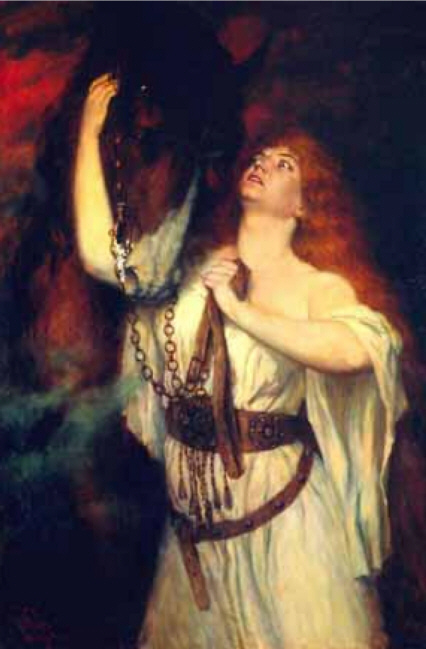
Alice Guszalewicz as Brünnhilde in Wagner's Götterdämmerung

Guszalewicz was born in Budapest, and in 1896, at the age of seventeen, married opera singer Eugen Guszalewicz. She studied with her husband and made her debut in 1903 at the Theater of Bern, in Switzerland. In 1905, she sang at the Cologne Opera as the Queen of Sheba in La reine de Saba by Gounod, and as Isolde in Wagner's masterpiece. Shortly after her role in Tristan, she was offered a six-year contract to sing in Cologne.

Guszalewicz continued to sing in Cologne until 1916 and toured throughout Europe. She also sang in several operas and gave recitals in Karlsruhe (1906), Düsseldorf (1907), Bremen (1908) and Dresden (1908). In Dresden at the Semperoper, she performed the title role in Salome for the first time. Her interpretation of Salome caused a sensation.

For many years a picture of her performance was thought to show the play's author, Wilde in women's drag. The picture was even reproduced in Richard Ellmann's biography of Wilde. In 1994 Wilde scholar Merlin Holland noted that the picture in fact showed Guszalewicz. This correction undermined readings of Wilde as a cross-dresser.

She performed at the Leipzig Opera (1908), at the Berlin State Opera (1911 as Brünnhilde and as Isolde), as well as in Brussels, Paris and Madrid. In 1905, she sang the lead role in Isidore de Lara's opera Messaline in Cologne, which was a great success for her. The opera had 27 performances.

Guszalewicz gave concerts at the opera in Frankfurt am Main (1907), at the Stadttheater of Bremen (1908) and at the National Theatre Munich (1910 as Salome). Her repertoire included the roles of Leonore in Fidelio, Adriano in Rienzi, Venus in Tannhäuser, the title role of Ingwelde in Max von Schillings' opera, Elektra (opera) in the opera of Richard Strauss, Berthe in Le prophète by Meyerbeer, Santuzza in Cavalleria Rusticana, the title role in Mascagni's Amica, and Maria in A basso porto by Niccola Spinelli.

After ending her career, she worked as a teacher in Munich. Her daughter Genia Guszalewicz (1902–71) became one of her students, and she followed her mother into a career as an opera singer.

Alice Guszalewicz died at the age of 61 in Munich, Germany.

== Media ==
Komm' o Hoffnung.ogg
The Komm' o Hoffnung aria from Ludwig van Beethoven's Fidelio, performed by Alice Guszalewicz
