= Albert Dubosq =

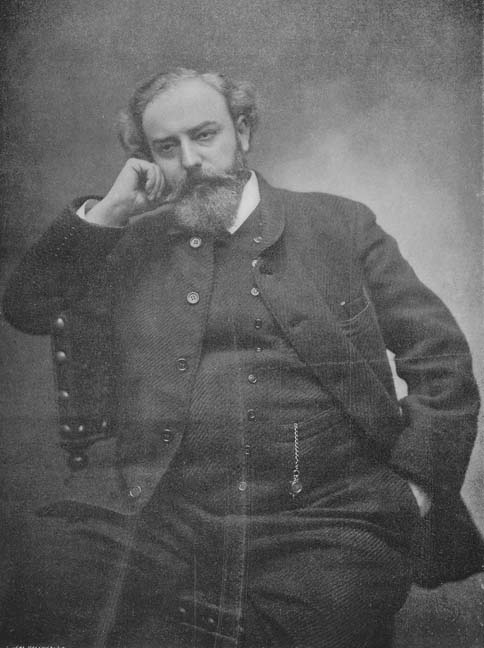
- Albert Dubosq, c. 1906. Photograph by Georges Dupont-Émera.
- Born: January 18, 1863; Paris
- Died: November 10, 1940 (aged 77); Lyon
- Education: Eugène Carpezat, Jean Daran, Enrico Robecchi, Pierre Zarra
- Occupation: scenographer (peintre-décorateur)
- Spouses: Marie Séverine Tellon (1891), Marie Virginie Pignatel (1901), Marguerite ‘Darvil’ Boulanger (1912)
- Children: Francis Dubosq (1910–?)
- Writing career
- Years active: 1890–1925
- Period: Belle Époque
- Subject: theater

Signature
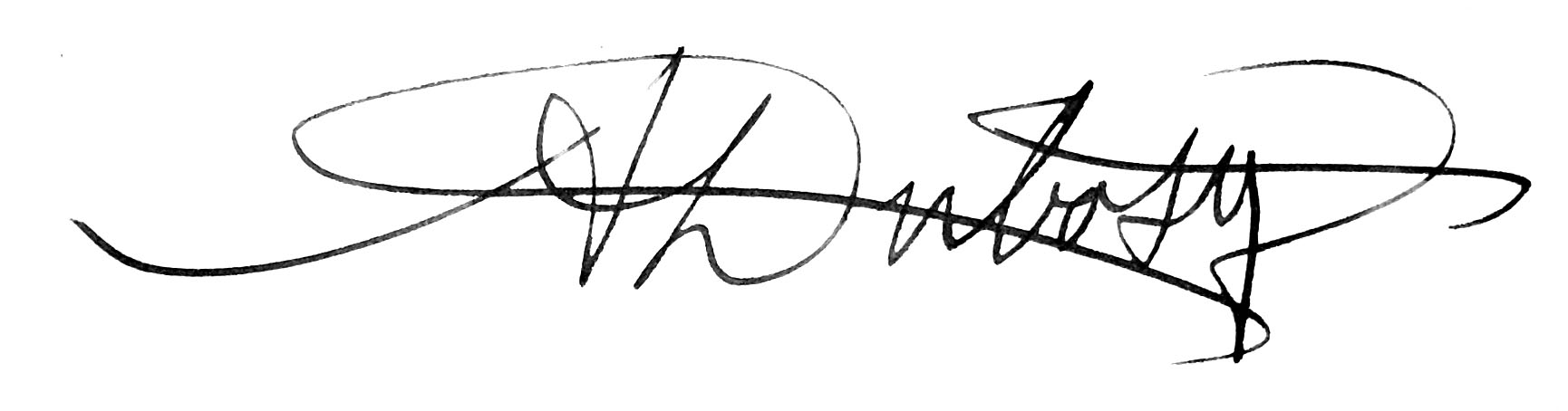

Albert Émile Clément Dubosq (often misspelled 'Duboscq'; 1863–1940) is one of the most prolific Belgian scenographers of the Belle Époque. Between 1890 and 1925 Dubosq decorated 446 theatrical entertainments of virtually every possible kind: ballet, circus, (melo)drama, opera, operetta, pantomime, revue, and vaudeville. Dubosq is furthermore one of the few scenic painters of his generation to have left a substantial sample of his art, namely twenty-one (near-)complete sets. Comprising Europe's largest holding of historical decors, the hundreds of flats and drops of the ‘Dubosq’ collection have survived at the Schouwburg of Kortrijk since 1920.

== Career ==
=== Childhood and education in Paris ===
Dubosq was born into a family of gilders that had moved from the provinces to Paris around the middle of the nineteenth century. His father, Henri Dubosq, was a native of Le Havre while his mother, Adèle Briet, originatined from Quivières. Apparently showing signs of artistry already in his childhood, Dubosq began to master the secrets of illusionistic set design at the age of thirteen. He apprenticed with four Parisian decorators that were acclaimed in their day: Pierre Zarra, Eugène Carpezat, Jean Daran, and Enrico Robecchi. In keeping with his teachers, all four of whom produced extensive portfolios for several theaters in and outside Paris, Dubosq fostered the ambition to become an independent artist. However, since fin-de-siècle Paris was already saturated with ateliers de décors, Dubosq emigrated to Belgium in June 1887 to establish his own workshop in the country's flourishing capital, Brussels.

=== A rising star of fin-de-siècle Brussels ===
Dubosq first enlarged his experience at the Théâtre de la Monnaie under the supervision of Pierre Devis and Armand Lynen, who had offered him a job. On 3 January 1890, he debuted as a self-employed stage designer at the Théâtre de l’Alcazar, furnishing scenery for Luc Malpertuis and George Garnir's Ex-Clarmonde, a vaudevillian spoof of Massenet's opera Esclarmonde (1889). 5 February 1890 saw the premiere of Bruxelles à cheval, an ‘equestrian revue’ (revue équestre) by Malpertuis staged at the Cirque Royal. Bruxelles à cheval was to be the first of Dubosq's many contributions to the revue, a satirical genre involving spoken dialogues, sung couplets, ballets, and parades. Most frequently performed around the end of the year, the revue enjoyed such a vogue in fin-de-siècle Brussels that many productions ran for more than a hundred performances: Bruxelles fin de siècle (Alcazar, 1891), for instance, was performed 145 times, while Bruxelles Haut-Congo (Alcazar, 1890) toured Belgium. Dubosq gave his imagination free rein in a string of works coupling the locus of the Belgian capital—often invoked in the title—with recent events in politics, culture and technology: Bruxelles électrique (referring to the electrification of the Alcazar, 1892), Bruxelles port de mer (alluding to the capital's increasing harbor activity, 1893), Bruxelles sans gêne (a parody of Victorien Sardou’s hit Madame Sans-Gêne, Alcazar, 1894), and so on. With a fresh palette and a photographic sense of realism, Dubosq’s revue sets conjured up the new hotspots of Brussels, next to featuring comic fantasies and even Jules Vernian science-fiction.

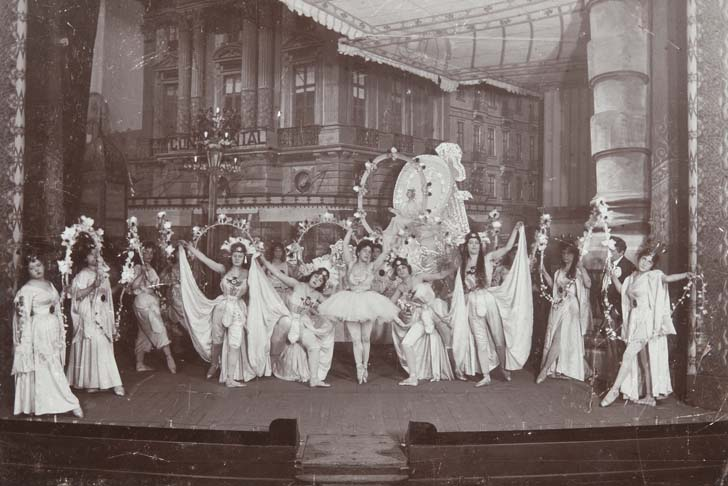
A scene from Malpertuis and Hannon’s revue Bruxelles sans gêne (Théâtre de l'Alcazar, Brussels, 1894), showing the “Ballet des pierres précieuses.” The stage set by Albert Dubosq represents “La place de Brouckère, vue du Café Métropole.” Photograph by Georges Dupont-Émera held at the Royal Library ‘Albert I’, Brussels.

Dubosq began to be called upon for other types of spectacle as well. At the Alhambra and Théâtre Royal du Parc in Brussels, the artist provided spoken plays of melodramatic allure with historicist and exotic sets that received praise from the press and audience alike. His scenery for Judith Gautier's japonaiserie La marchande de sourires (Théâtre Molière, 25 November 1897) was thus extolled:

Le deuxième acte nous transporte dans un paysage fantastique, dont Dubosq a fait une merveille d’impression poignante : les rives du Sonnuda-Gara, la nuit. La berge descend rapidement vers la rivière que longe une palissade à demi brisée. Sur l’autre rive, on aperçoit des cahutes de pêcheurs, dans les bambous, et les toitures des tours sacrées. Une grosse lanterne rouge éclaire, seule, ce coin désolé … Au troisième acte, un décor superbe, un décor de rêve, de Dubosq encore, et qui fera sensation sans aucun doute; deux jardins contigus séparés par un mur qui disparaît sous l’admirable végétation du pays; une rivière serpente parmi les lotus, les buissons aux mille fleurs du printemps.

At the Théâtre des Galeries Saint-Hubert, operettas old and new received a luxurious treatment from Dubosq that often rivaled earlier and contemporary Parisian stagings. Complete interiors, among which the auditoriums of the Pôle Nord (1893), Palais d’Éte (1894 and 1897), Alcazar (1897) and Tréteaux (1897), were decorated by Dubosq. More substantial chores began to fill his order book in the guise of stock sets for the new Stadsschouwburg of Amsterdam (1894), the Casino of Nieuwpoort (1896) and Nieuw Circus of Ghent (1897), next to materials for circus companies traveling to Budapest, London, and Vienna. In 1898, Dubosq created the five sets for the itinerant production of Rostand's Cyrano de Bergerac, which visited sixteen different countries after its premiere at the Opéra de Monte-Carlo (29 March 1898).

Actively supported by the Belgian press, Dubosq grew into a public figure by the late 1890s. Newspapers published interviews and caricatures, or followed his presence among the high society. ‘Official’ institutions such as the Belgian State invited him to fulfill prestigious commissions and to represent Belgium at the Brussels International Exposition (1897) and the Exposition Universelle (1900).

=== The opera scenographer ===
Immediately upon their accession to the directorship of the Théâtre de la Monnaie, on 1 June 1900, Maurice Kufferath and Guillaume Guidé appointed Dubosq the Monnaie's second peintre-décorateur attitré, next to Devis and Lynen. Dubosq's first contribution to the Monnaie was the “Quartier Latin” set for Giacomo Puccini’s La (vie de) bohème, Act II. Premiered on 25 October 1900 under the supervision of the composer and publisher Tito Ricordi, this production enjoyed thirty performances in its first run alone and would keep the stage until 1949. Significantly, Puccini and Riccordi were so enthralled by Dubosq’s effort that they had it photographed and incorporated in Riccardo Salvadori’s new design for Act II of Puccini’s masterpiece.

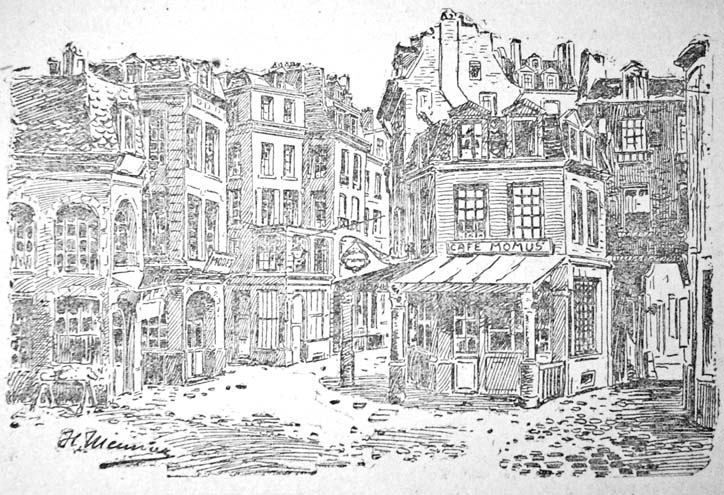
Set design by Dubosq for Puccini's La (vie de) bohème (Théâtre de la Monnaie, Brussels, 1900), Act II. Illustration by Henri Meunier in Le petit bleu du matin.

After La Bohème, Dubosq received a string of commissions from the Monnaie:

- the world premieres of Vincent d’Indy’s L’Étranger (7 January 1903), Albert Dupuis’ Jean Michel (3 March 1903), Ernest Chausson’s Le roi Arthus (30 November 1903), and Dupuis’ Martille (3 March 1905)
- the Belgian premieres of Charpentier’s Louise (8 February 1901), Wagner’s Le crépuscule des dieux (Götterdämmerung, 24 December 1901, featuring the earliest use of the cyclorama in Belgium and closing the first complete Ring cycle outside Germany), Puccini’s Tosca (2 April 1904), Massenet’s Le jongleur de Notre-Dame (25 November 1904) and Ariane (12 November 1907), Messager’s Madame Chrysanthème (9 November 1906), and Gailhard’s Amaryllis (8 February 1907)
- complete make-overs of Bizet’s Carmen (19 November 1902), Gounod’s Faust (3 November 1904; attended by King Leopold II), Gluck’s Alceste (14 December 1904) and Armide (7 November 1905), and Berlioz’ La damnation de Faust (adaptation by Raoul Gunsbourg, 21 February 1906) and Les Troyens (26 December 1906)

Several of this stagings were created by Dubosq in close collaboration with the stage director Charles De Beer and costume designer (and symbolist painter) Fernand Khnopff. Dubosq's activity at la Monnaie paved the way to new commissions from other opera houses, such as the Théâtre Royal of Liège (Louise, 1902), the Grand-Théâtre of Lyon (Salammbô, 1903; Le crépuscule des dieux, 1904), the Théâtre Royal (Français) of Antwerp (thirty-six productions, starting with Le jongleur de Notre-Dame in 1905 and ending with Aida in 1924), the Théâtre Royal of Ostend (a.o. Lakmé, 1905), the Vlaamse Opera of Antwerp (starting with the theater's inaugural production of Blockx’ De herbergprinses, 1907), and the Grand Théâtre of Ghent (a.o. Carmen, 1912). The highlight of Dubosq's career was no doubt the staging of Götterdämmerung at the Parisian Académie Nationale de Musique (Palais Garnier, 23 October 1908), to which the artist contributed three magnificent sets—with resident set designers Eugène Carpezat and Marcel Jambon furnishing (only) one each.

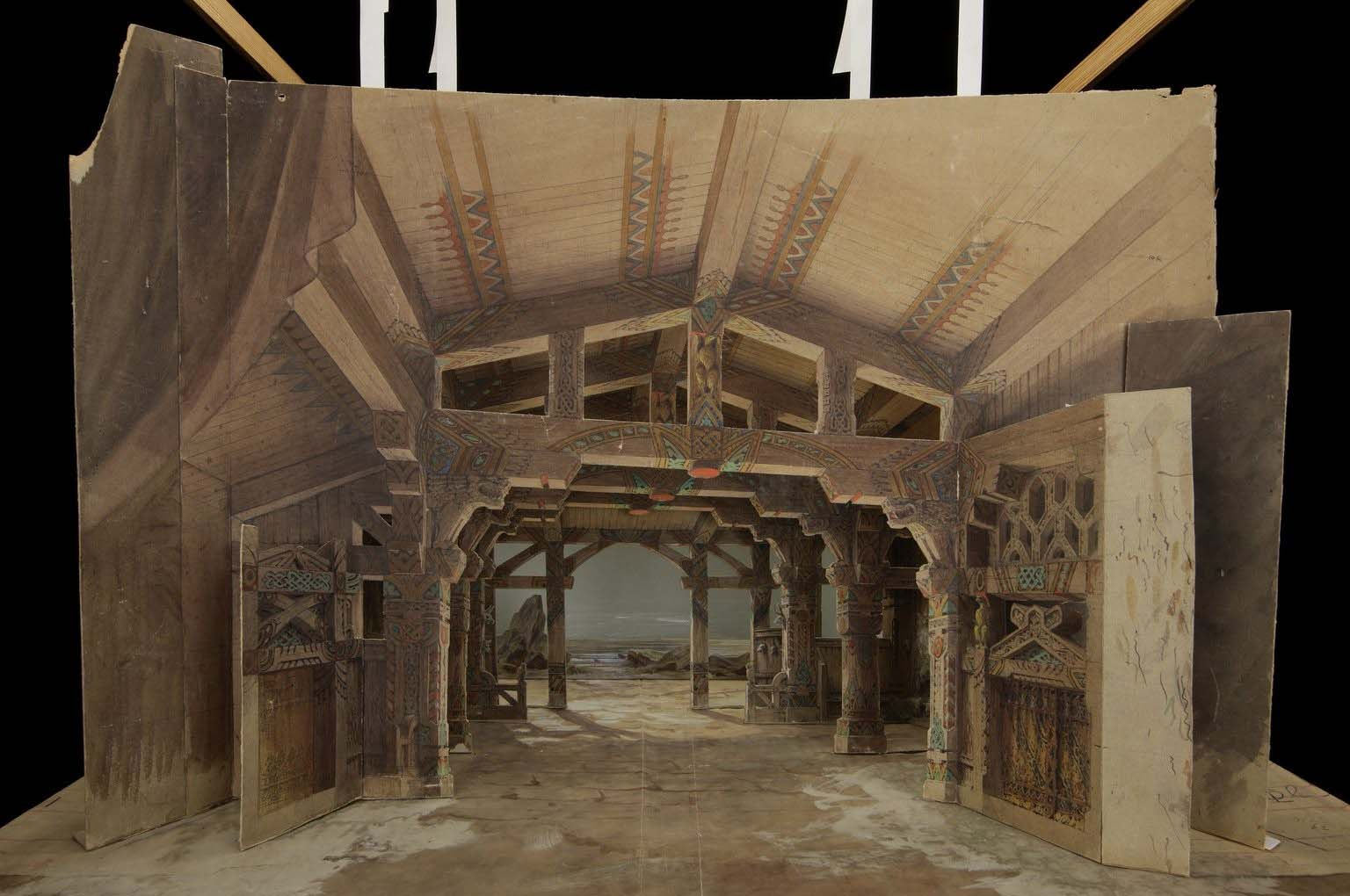
Dubosq's scale-model for Wagner's Götterdämmerung (Opéra, Paris, 1908), Act III, scene 1. Bibliothèque-Musée de l’Opéra, Paris.

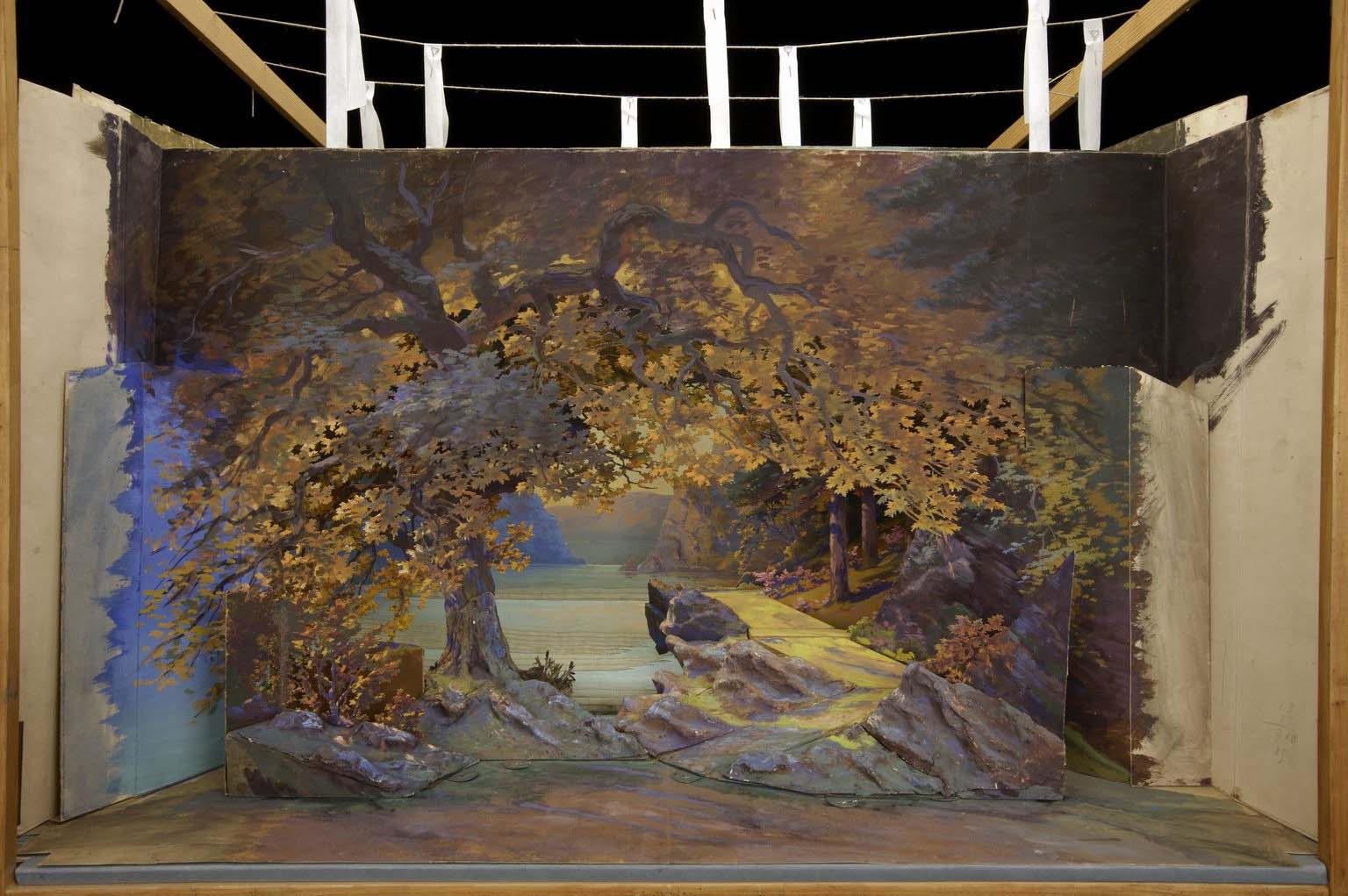
Dubosq's scale-model for Wagner's Götterdämmerung (Opéra, Paris, 1908), Act III, scene 1. Bibliothèque-Musée de l’Opéra, Paris.

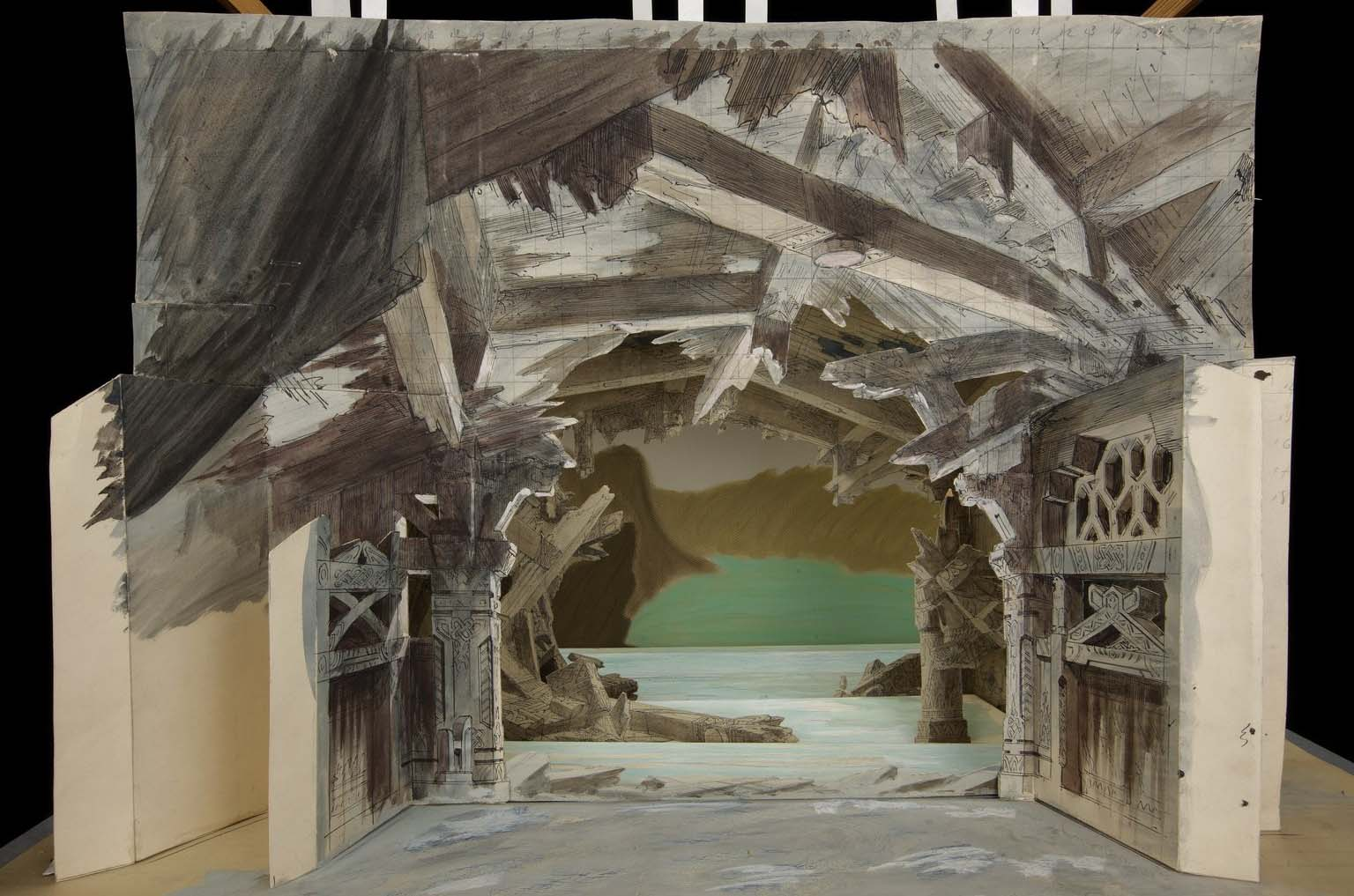
Dubosq's scale-model for Wagner's Götterdämmerung (Opéra, Paris, 1908), Act III, scene 2. Bibliothèque-Musée de l’Opéra, Paris.

== Venues ==
Following is a list of venues at which Dubosq's activity is supported by historical evidence:

=== Belgium ===
Antwerp

- Royal (Français)
- Variétés
- Vlaamse Opera

Brussels

- Alcazar / Nouveautés / Nouvelle Comédie
- Alhambra / Empire-Palace
- Bruxelles-Kermesse
- Cercle Artistique
- Cercle ‘Le Crotin’
- Cirque Kiralfy
- Cirque Royal
- Concert Noble
- Diable-au-Corps
- Exposition Universelle (1897)
- Foire commerciale
- Folies-Bergère
- Gaîté
- Galeries Saint-Hubert
- Molière
- Monnaie
- Olympia
- Palais des Sports
- Parc
- Passage du Nord / Variétés
- Pôle Nord / Palais d’Été
- Scala
- Tréteaux
- Vaudeville

Charleroi

- Éden
- Renaissance
- Théâtre
- Variétés

Ghent

- Feestpaleis
- Grand Théâtre
- Koninklijke Nederlandse Schouwburg
- Nieuw Circus

Kortrijk

- Liberale Kring ‘Ons Huis’
- Stadsschouwburg

Laken

- Château

Leuven

- Stadsschouwburg

Liège

- Gymnase / Éden
- Pavillon de la Flore
- Royal

Nieuwpoort

- Casino

Ostend

- Casino-Kursaal
- Eldorado
- Ons Huis
- Royal / Schouwburg
- Scala

Tournai

- Communal
- Halle aux Draps

=== Abroad ===
Amsterdam

- Circus Schumann
- Stadsschouwburg

Budapest

- 'Théâtre des Fêtes du Millénaire'

Granville

- Casino

London

- Crystal Palace
- Earl's Court
- Globe
- Olympia

Lyon

- Grand Théâtre

Monte Carlo

- Opéra

Paris

- Académie Nationale de Musique
- Apollo
- Exposition des Arts Décoratifs (1925)
- Exposition Universelle (1900)
- Gymnase
- Moulin Rouge

Vienna

- Zirkus Renz

== Bibliography ==
=== Historical ===
- Anonymous, ‘Un Bruxellois par jour : Albert Dubosq’, Le petit bleu du matin, 4 May 1896.
- Anonymous, ‘Albert Dubosq’, Le carnet mondain, 14–20 August 1902. Reprinted in Le Carillon, 27 August 1902.
- Anonymous, ‘Albert Dubosq’, Théâtre et musique 1/3 (1906), 70-71.
- Louis Dumont-Wilden, George Garnir and Leon Souguenet, ‘Albert Dubosq, décorateur’, Pourquoi pas ?, 16 June 1913.

=== Modern ===
- Griet Blanckaert, ‘De glansproblematiek bij de vroeg-20ste-eeuwse theaterdecors van Albert Dubosq uit de verzameling van de Kortrijkse Stadschouwburg’, in Glans in de conservatie-restauratie / Lustre et brillance en conservation-restauration, ed. Marjan Buyle (Brussels: Vlaams Instituut voor het Onroerend Erfgoed, 2014), 59-67.
- Anne-Sophie Braconnier, ‘Les décors et la mise en scène à l’époque des créations wagnériennes’, in La Monnaie wagnérienne, ed. Manuel Couvreur (Brussels: ULB, 1998), 118-151.
- Tijs De Schacht, ‘Erfgoed van formaat in de Kortrijkse Schouwburg’, Openbaar Kunstbezit Vlaanderen 58/5 (2020), 12-17. Open access
- Bruno Forment, ‘De historische repertoiredecors in de Kortrijkse Stadsschouwburg (1914-20)’, Koninklijke Geschied- en Oudheidkundige Kring van Kortrijk. Handelingen 74 (2009), 47-104. Open access
- Bruno Forment, ‘In kleur en op ware grootte: de operadecors van Albert Dubosq’, in Opera: achter de schermen van de emotie, ed. Francis Maes and Piet De Volder (Leuven: LannooCampus, 2011), 228-249.
- Bruno Forment, ‘De zwanenzang van een illusie: de historische decors van de Kortrijkse Schouwburg’, STEPP - Magazine voor de producerende, ontwerpende en technische krachten van de brede culturele sector 1/3 (2012), 26-28. Open access
- Bruno Forment, ‘Staging Verdi in the provinces: the Aida scenery of Albert Dubosq’, in Staging Verdi and Wagner, ed. Naomi Matsumoto (Turnhout: Brepols, 2015), 263-286.
- Bruno Forment, Zwanenzang van een illusie: de historische toneeldecors van de Schouwburg Kortrijk (Kortrijk: Koninklijke Geschied- en Oudheidkundige Kring Kortrijk, 2015). ISBN 978-9-461-36055-7
- Bruno Forment, ‘Refashioning Carmen at the Théâtre de La Monnaie, 1902’, in Carmen Abroad: Bizet’s Opera on the Global Stage, ed. Richard Langham Smith and Clair Rowden (Cambridge: Cambridge University Press, 2020), 80-93. ISBN 978-1-108-48161-8
- Bruno Forment, ‘Visser voor de eeuwigheid’, in Droomlanders: Tovenaars van het geschilderde toneeldecor (Antwerp: Davidsfonds/CEMPER, 2021), 74-84. ISBN 978-9-022-33818-6
- Ian Mundell, ‘Finding a New Role for Flanders’ Historic Theatre Scenery’, The Low Countries (30 June 2021). Open access
- Paul Piron, ‘Dubosq, Albert’, in Dictionnaire des artistes plasticiens de Belgique des XIXe et XXe siècles, ed. Nicolas Poncelet (Ohain-Lasne: Art in Belgium, 2003), I, 518.
- Annelies Vandenhaute, Onderzoek van de relatie tussen de schadeverschijnselen en de gebruikte materialen bij een vroeg-20ste-eeuws theaterdecor door Albert Dubosq uit de collectie van de Stadsschouwburg te Kortrijk (MA thesis, Artesis Hogeschool, 2012).
- Nadia Wilting, Preventieve conservering van de historische theaterdecors van de Schouwburg Kortrijk. Case-study: het Palais romain (1913) van Albert Dubosq (MA thesis, Artesis Hogeschool, 2013).
