= Hans Kronold =

Polish-born American cellist (1872–1922)

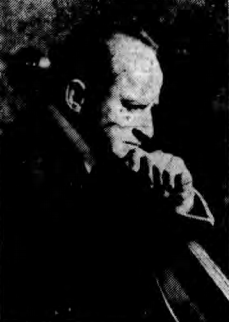
- Hans Kronold, The Saratogian, 2 April 1921
- Born: 3 July 1872; Kraków
- Died: 10 January 1922 (aged 49); New York City
- Occupation: Cellist
- Known for: First cellist on Bettini's cylinders.

Hans Kronold (3 July 1872 – 10 January 1922) was a Polish-born Jewish cellist, composer, educator, and a member of symphony orchestras of New York and Boston. He was the first cellist to have his work recorded on audio, which he did for recording pioneer Gianni Bettini phonograph cylinders in the 1890s.

== Life and career ==
Kronold was born in Kraków to Adolph Kronold and Louise (Hirschberg) Kronold. His sister was the opera soprano Selma Kronold; a cousin of Polish pianist and composer Moritz Moszkowski. He had his first musical training in Leipzig, where he studied with Max Kiesling (1866–1930). He lived in Berlin for three years, where he extended his musical education with Professor Richard Vollrath, and piano and harmony with Hans Rasch. In 1886, he emigrated to New York, resuming his studies with cellist Anton Hekking, and S. Vreeman.

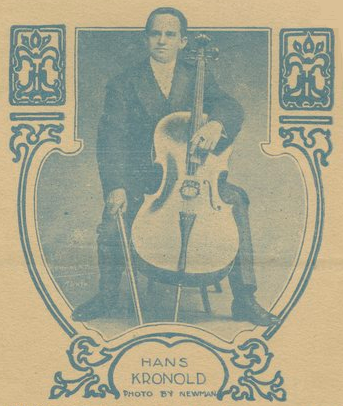
Kronold, c. 1905

Kronold soon joined the Metropolitan Opera and shortly after the New York Symphony Orchestra, where he played for five consecutive seasons. In 1894, he married Rose Fischel and had two daughter, Nora and Sophie Kronold. From 1900, he toured the United States and Canada for five years under the direction of Walter Damrosch, accompanying not only singers and acclaimed violinists such as Maud Powell, but also other renowned instrumentalists of his time. On his return, he quit playing for orchestras and devoted himself to solo-playing and teaching at the New York College of Music. He died in New York on 10 January 1922.

Kronold made a number of 78 RPMs and phonograph cylinder recordings for Columbia Records, and the Thomas A. Edison, Inc., publishing his compositions for cello and piano, violin and piano, and other songs through leading publishing houses such as the Oliver Ditson Company, Carl Fischer Music, and M. Witmark & Sons.

== Recordings ==
=== Cello solo with piano ===
Note: The grey cells in the tables indicate that there is no opus number, name or composer. The m-dashe cells indicate that there is an opus number, name or composer, but that they are currently missing.

| Title | Opus | Name | Key | Composer | Year | Note | Ref |
|---|---|---|---|---|---|---|---|
| The Babbling Brook | — | — | — | Christiaan Kriens | 1895 | (Note: The Catalog of Copyright Entries lists this composition as having been written by Kronold, but the Witman & Sons catalog lists it as being by Christiaan Kriens.) | |
| Coquettish Waltz | — | — | — | Christiaan Kriens | — | (Note: This composition for violin and piano, is listed as a work by Kriens and Kronold. In fact it was edited by Kronold, but written by Kriens. Source: Todd Dunkel ISBN Index) | |
| Epitaph Meditation | — | — | — | Christiaan Kriens | 1895 | (Note: The Catalog of Copyright Entries lists this composition as having been written by Kronold, but the Witman & Sons catalog lists it as being by Christiaan Kriens.) | |
| A Sad Song | — | — | — | Christiaan Kriens | 1895 | (Note: The Catalog of Copyright Entries lists this composition as having been written by Kronold, but the Witman & Sons catalog lists it as being by Christiaan Kriens.) | |
| Summer Evening | — | — | — | Christiaan Kriens | 1895 | (Note: The Catalog of Copyright Entries lists this composition as having been written by Kronold, but the Witman & Sons catalog lists it as being by Christiaan Kriens.) | |
| Schwanengesang | D. 957 | Ständchen | — | Franz Schubert | 1905 | (Note: Schubert's serenade for violincello solo with piano accompaniment. Recorded for the Edison Gold Moulded Record.) | |
| Kinderszenen | 15 | Träumerei | — | Robert Schumann | 1905 | (Note: Robert Schumann's Träumerei for violincello solo with piano accompaniment. Recorded for the Edison Gold Moulded Record.) | |
| The Swan | 93 | — | — | Camille Saint-Saëns | 1906 | (Note: One of Kronold's most popular cello solos. It is an extract from one of Camille Saint-Saëns' famous work "Carnival of the Animals." Published by the Edison Gold Moulded Record.) | |
| Simple Aveu | 25 | — | — | François Thomé | 1906 | (Note: A piece for cello and piano whose title is translated as "Simple confession". It is stylistically similar to other piano pieces by Cécile Chaminade. Recorded for Edison Gold Moulded Record.) | |
| Ave Maria | CG 89a | — | — | Charles Gounod | 1907 | (Note: Ave Maria for cello solo with piano accompaniment. Recorded for the Edison Gold Moulded Record.) | |
| Nocturnes | 9 | No. 2 | E-flat major | Frédéric Chopin | 1907 | (Note: Chopin's Nocturnes in E-flat major Op. 9, No. 2 for cello solo with piano accompaniment. Recorded for the Edison Gold Moulded Record.) | |
| The Rosary | — | — | — | Ethelbert Nevin | 1907 | (Note: Ethelbert Nevin's The Rosary for cello solo with piano accompaniment. Recorded for the Edison Gold Moulded Record.) | |
| Handel's Largo | HWV 40 | Ombra mai fu | — | George Frideric Handel | 1908 | (Note: Ombra mai fu, also known as Handel's Largo, is the aria from Handel's opera Serse recorded for cello and piano accompaniment for the Edison Gold Moulded Record.) | |
| Humoreske | 101 | No. 7 | G-flat major | Antonín Dvořák | 1908 | (Note: Antonín Dvořák's Op. 101, No. 7 (Humoresques) for cello and piano accompaniment recorded for the Edison Amberol.) | |
| Tre giorni son che Nina | — | Canzonetta | — | Attrib Giovanni Battista Pergolesi | 1909 | (Note: Giovanni Battista Pergolesi's Nina (Tre giorni son che Nina) recorded for cello and piano accompaniment for the Edison Amberol.) | |
| Adoration | — | — | D major | Felix Borowski | 1910 | (Note: A nocturne originally for violin and piano; arranged for cello and piano by Kronold.) | |
| Wiegenlied | — | — | — | Alice Verne-Bredt | 1913 | (Note: This composition (Lullaby) is one from the English composer Alice Verne-Bredt (1864-1958), recorded in 1913 by Kronold who maintained its primary title.) | |
| The Little Red Lark | — | — | — | — | 1913 | (Note: Traditional Irish folk-song.) | |
| Believe Me, If All Those Endearing Young Charms | — | — | — | Thomas Moore | 1913 | (Note: Traditional Irish folk-song.) | |
| Canzonetta | — | — | — | Alfredo D'Ambrosio | 1913 | (Note: Published by Phonograph Co.) | |
| Melody in F | 3 | No. 2 | F major | Anton Rubinstein | 1913 | (Note: Anton Rubinstein's Op. 3, No. 1 (Melody in F) for cello and piano accompaniment recorded for the Edison Gold Moulded Record.) | |
| The Valley Lay Smiling Before Me | — | — | — | Thomas Moore | 1913 | (Note: An eighteenth-century Irish ballad attributed to Thomas Moore's Irish Melodies. A recording released by Pathé Records.) | |
| Eili Eili | — | — | — | — | 1913 | (Note: Hebrew-Yiddish cry of anguish to God. A recording released by Pathé Records.) | |
| Kol Nidre | 47 | — | — | Max Bruch | 1913 | (Note: Recording released by Pathé Records.) | |
| The Willow Tree | — | — | — | — | 1913 | (Note: Traditional Irish folk-song. Recording released by Pathé Records) | |
| My Heart At Thy Sweet Voice | 47 | — | — | Camille Saint-Saëns | 1913 | (Note: A song from the opera Samson et Dalila. A recording released by the Edison Phonograph.) | |

=== Violin solo with piano ===
| Title | Opus | Name | Key | Composer | Year | Note | Ref |
|---|---|---|---|---|---|---|---|
| Douce Rencontre | — | — | — | Jean Gabriel-Marie | 1913 | (Note: Recorded for Columbia (USA).) | |
| Andante Religioso | — | — | — | Joseph Hollman | 1913 | (Note: Recorded for Columbia (USA).) | |

=== Cello solo with orchestra ===
| Title | Opus | Name | Key | Composer | Year | Note | Ref |
|---|---|---|---|---|---|---|---|
| To The Evening Star | WWV 70 | — | — | Richard Wagner | 1907 | (Note: This composition was also recorded by Kronold for Columbia Phonograph Co. in 1905 as Evening star (O du mein holder Abendstern).) | |
| Libeslied | — | — | — | Fritz Kreisler | 1913 | (Note: From Fritz Kreisler's Alt-Wiener Tanzweisen, No. 2, a composition for cello with orchestra accompaniment recorded for the Edison Blue Amberol.) | |

== Compositions ==
| Title | Opus | Name | Key | Genre | Year | Note | Ref |
|---|---|---|---|---|---|---|---|
| Lègende | 1 | — | — | — | 1895 | (Note: Kronold's first instrumental composition published by Emanuel Pergament, New York.) | |
| The Soldier's Bride | — | — | — | March | 1905 | (Note: A composition for piano and voice with lyrics about the Spanish–American War by Kronold himself. It was specially written for the Hearst Sunday Newspaper.) | |
| Turn Thee Unto Me | 16 | (Sacred song) | — | Psalm | 1913 | (Note: Published by M. Witmark & Sons.) | |
| A Vision of my Mother | 17 | — | — | — | 1909 | (Note: Published by C. Fischer.) | |
| Air Religieuse | 18 | — | — | Air | 1909 | (Note: Published by C. Fischer.) | |
| Romance | 19 | — | — | Romance | 1909 | (Note: This composition, unlike Coquettish Waltz written by Kronold and edited by Kriens, was scored to violin and piano from the original cello and piano score. Published by C. Fischer.) | |
| Spinning Wheel | 20 | — | — | — | 1909 | (Note: A composition written by cellist Hans Kronold, edited and fingered by violinist Christiaan Kriens. Published by C. Fischer.) | |
| Witches' Dance | 21 | — | — | — | 1909 | (Note: Published by C. Fischer.) | |
| Scène Élégiaque | 22 | — | — | — | 1909 | (Note: Published by C. Fischer.) | |
| The Soul of Love | 24 | — | — | — | 1909 | (Note: A song with words by D. Vail. Published by C. Fischer.) | |
| Roses and Cypresses | 25 | Roses | — | Lieder | 1910 | (Note: A cycle of eight German songs with words by Ferdinand Tönnies. Published by C. Fischer.) | |
| Roses and Cypresses | 25 | Thine | — | Lieder | 1910 | (Note: A cycle of eight German songs with words by Ferdinand Tönnies. Published by C. Fischer.) | |
| Roses and Cypresses | 25 | Night | — | Lieder | 1910 | (Note: A cycle of eight German songs with words by Ferdinand Tönnies. Published by C. Fischer.) | |
| Roses and Cypresses | 25 | A Song You Sang! | — | Lieder | 1910 | (Note: A cycle of eight German songs with words by Ferdinand Tönnies. Published by C. Fischer.) | |
| Roses and Cypresses | 25 | A Vision | — | Lieder | 1910 | (Note: A cycle of eight German songs with words by Ferdinand Tönnies. Published by C. Fischer.) | |
| Roses and Cypresses | 25 | May Eternal! | — | Lieder | 1910 | (Note: A cycle of eight German songs with words by Ferdinand Tönnies. Published by C. Fischer.) | |
| Roses and Cypresses | 25 | Lost Love | — | Lieder | 1910 | (Note: A cycle of eight German songs with words by Ferdinand Tönnies. Published by C. Fischer.) | |
| Roses and Cypresses | 25 | Sphinx | — | Lieder | 1910 | (Note: A cycle of eight German songs with words by Ferdinand Tönnies. Published by C. Fischer.) | |
| At the Shrine of Venus | 26 | — | — | — | 1912 | (Note: The score reads Four Concert Pieces, a compilation of Opuses by Kronold, fingered and edited by Italian piano instructor and publisher, Paolo Gallico. Published by C. Fischer.) | |
| Caprice Espagnole | 28 | — | — | Capriccio | 1912 | (Note: The score reads Four Concert Pieces, a compilation of Opuses by Kronold, fingered and edited by Italian piano instructor and publisher, Paolo Gallico. Published by C. Fischer.) | |
| Liebeszauber | 30 | — | — | — | 1912 | (Note: The score reads Four Concert Pieces, a compilation of Opuses by Kronold, fingered and edited by Italian piano instructor and publisher, Paolo Gallico. Published by C. Fischer.) | |
| In Olden Days | 31 | — | — | Minuet | 1912 | (Note: A compilation of opuses fingered and edited by piano instructor and publisher Paolo Gallico. A score at Rochester.edu reads 'Minuet' (Andante simplice). Published by C. Fischer.) | |
| Trois Pièces | 32 | Meditation Religieuse | — | — | 1913 | (Note: Published by O. Ditson Co, Boston.) | |
| Trois Pièces | 32 | Melodie Romantique | — | — | 1913 | (Note: Published by O. Ditson Co, Boston.) | |
| Trois Pièces | 32 | Serenade Espagnole | — | Serenade | 1913 | (Note: Published by O. Ditson Co, Boston.) | |
| In Springtime | 38 | — | — | — | 1913 | (Note: A song with words by Ferdinand Tönnies. English version by Alice Mattullath.) | |
| Deux Pièces | 39 | Evening Song | — | — | 1913 | (Note: Two songs with words by Ferdinand Tönnies. English version by Alice Mattullath. Published by M. Witmark & Sons.) | |
| Deux Pièces | 39 | Autumn Song | — | — | 1913 | (Note: Two songs with words by Ferdinand Tönnies. English version by Alice Mattullath. Published by M. Witmark & Sons.) | |
| The Bride of Death | 40 | — | — | — | 1913 | (Note: A song with words by Ferdinand Tönnies]. English version by Alice Mattullath. Published by O. Ditson Co. Boston.) | |
| Sweetheart's Eyes | 43 | — | — | — | 1913 | (Note: A song with words by Ferdinand Tönnies. English version by Alice Mattullath. Published by O. Ditson Co. Boston.) | |
| Five Pieces for Cello and Piano | 57 | Longing | — | Romanza | 1914 | (Note: A composition for violoncello and piano accompaniment. All songs published by M. Witmark & Sons.) | |
| Five Pieces for Cello and Piano | 57 | Mother's Darling | — | Cradle Song | 1914 | (Note: A composition for violoncello and piano accompaniment. All songs published by M. Witmark & Sons.) | |
| Five Pieces for Cello and Piano | 57 | The Lonely Shepherd | — | Pastorale | 1914 | (Note: A composition for violoncello and piano accompaniment. All songs published by M. Witmark & Sons.) | |
| Five Pieces for Cello and Piano | 57 | The Mill | — | Etude | 1914 | (Note: A composition for violoncello and piano accompaniment. All songs published by M. Witmark & Sons.) | |
| Five Pieces for Cello and Piano | 57 | The Bumblebee | — | Moto perpetuo | 1914 | (Note: A composition for violoncello and piano accompaniment. All songs published by M. Witmark & Sons.) | |
| Five Pieces for Cello and Piano | 58 | Autumn Leaves | — | Idyll | 1913 | (Note: A composition for violoncello and piano accompaniment. All songs published by O. Ditson Co. Boston.) | |
| Five Pieces for Cello and Piano | 58 | On the Lake | — | Cavatina | 1914 | (Note: A composition for violoncello and piano accompaniment. All songs published by O. Ditson Co. Boston.) | |
| Five Pieces for Cello and Piano | 58 | The Clown | — | Humoreske | 1913 | (Note: A composition for violoncello and piano accompaniment. All songs published by O. Ditson Co. Boston.) | |
| Five Pieces for Cello and Piano | 58 | Declaration of Love | — | Reverie | 1913 | (Note: A composition for violoncello and piano accompaniment. All songs published by O. Ditson Co. Boston.) | |
| Five Pieces for Cello and Piano | 58 | In Italy | — | Tarantelle | 1913 | (Note: A composition for violoncello and piano accompaniment. All songs published by O. Ditson Co. Boston.) | |
