= Riccardo Salvadori =

Italian painter (1866–1927)

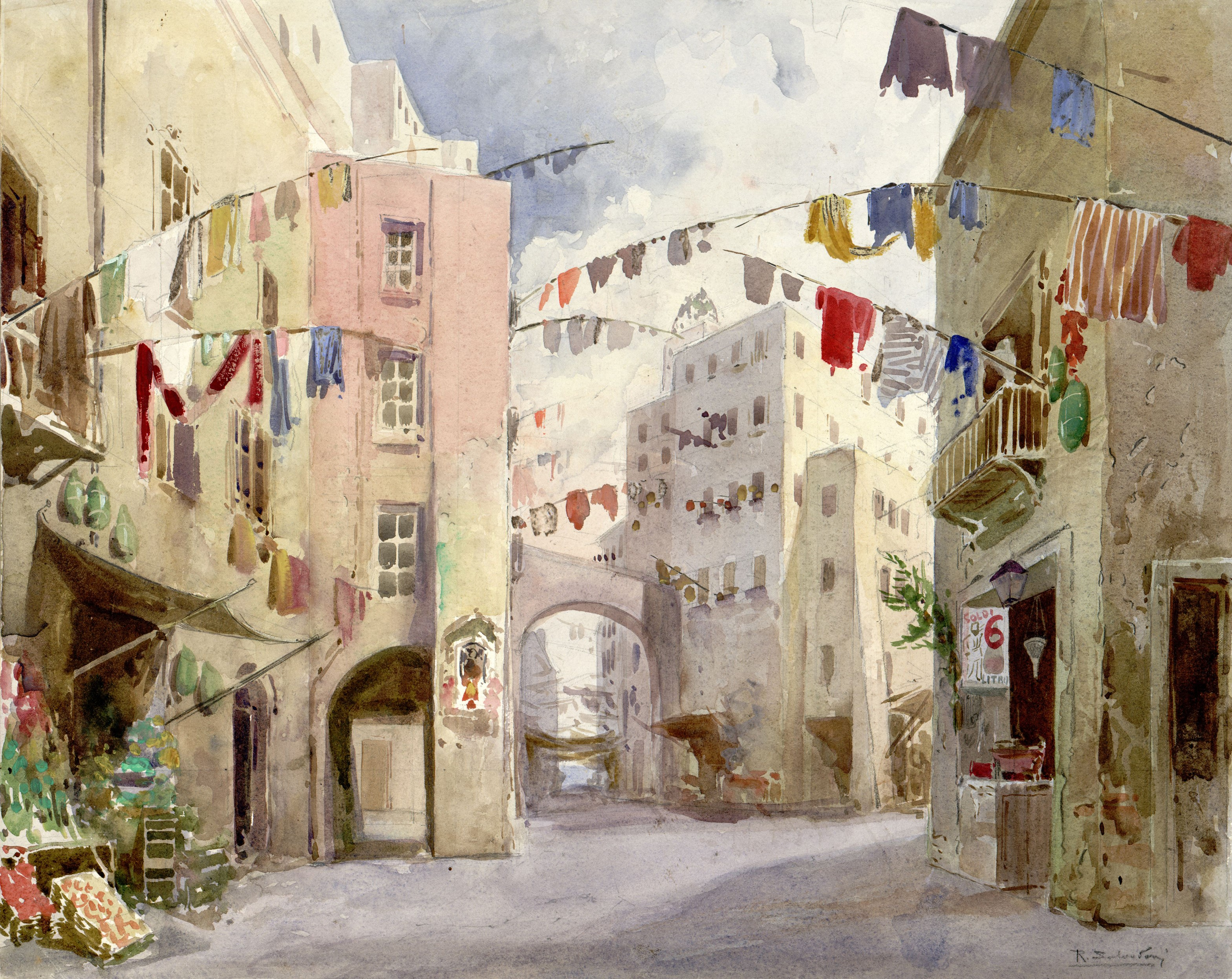
Act I set design for Niccola Spinelli's A basso porto

Riccardo Salvadori (1866–1927) was an Italian painter and illustrator.

== Biography ==
Salvadori was born in Piacenza. He initially trained at the Academies of Fine Arts of Lucca and Naples, where he was a long-time resident, but worked most of his life in Milan.

Among his painted works, mainly depicting genre subjects, are: In campo; The Chestnut seller, Note cupe (exhibited in 1898 at Turin), and Miseria stabile.

However, it is as illustrator of books, journals, and newspapers that Salvadori was best known. He contributed in Milan to the monthly and weekly segments of the Corriere della Sera during the editorship of Silvio Spaventa Filippi. From 1903, he contributed to the Romanzo mensile (which published serials of the adventures of Arsenio Lupin and Sherlock Holmes). He also worked for the monthly La Lettura and, starting in 1908, for the weekly Corriere dei piccoli. In addition, Salvadori contributed to the weekly Domenica del Corriere and illustrated a number of children's stories for the "Biblioteca dei ragazzi" series (including Alice in Wonderland) of the Istituto Editoriale Italiano, founded and curated by Silvio Spaventa Filippi. In 1908, he illustrated Nel regno dell'amore. Bozzetti narrativi e drammatici by Edmondo De Amicis for the Treves publishing house. Five years later, he illustrated the anthology La Milano del Porta edited by Attilio Momigliano for Formiggini. After the First World War, he recruited Vincenzo Morelli to Milan to collaborate with submissions for La Lettura.

Salvadori was also hired by the Ricordi publishing company to create model set designs (bozzetti) for future performances of Ricordi's catalogue. At least three operas by Giacomo Puccini received their definitive 'look' through Salvadori's agency: Edgar (complete scenography, 1889), La Bohème (alternative design for Act II, combining models by Lucien Jusseaume and Albert Dubosq, 1901), and Tosca (alternative design for Act II, 1901).
