= Crucial Instances =

Crucial Instances is a 1901 short story collection by Edith Wharton.

== Stories ==
The book contains a collection of seven stories:

- "The Duchess at Prayer"
- "The Angel at the Grave"
- "The Recovery"
- "Copy: A Dialogue"
- "The Rembrandt"
- "The Moving Finger"
- "The Confessional"

The story The Duchess at Prayer is a rewriting of Honoré de Balzac's short story La Grande Bretèche (1831).
