= Selma Kronold =

Polish soprano

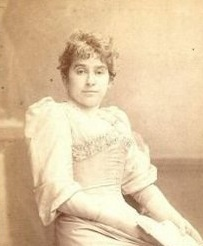
- Born: 18 August 1861; Kraków, Congress Poland
- Died: 9 October 1920 (aged 59); New York City, United States
- Occupation: Opera singer

Selma Kronold (18 August 1861 — 9 October 1920) was an American operatic soprano and pianist. Her repertoire included more than forty-five operas in three different languages. She took part in the musicals The Magic Melody, or Fortunnio's Song and At the Lower Harbor.

== Life and career ==
Selma Kronold, was born in Kraków to a family with Jewish roots. Her father was Adolph Kronold, her mother was Louise (Hirschberg) Kronold, and she was the sister of cellist Hans Kronold (1872–1922); and a cousin of Polish pianist and composer Moritz Moszkowski. She received her initial training in a convent, according to her own account, where she was also taught her first piano lessons. Moving to Germany, she studied with Arthur Nikisch at the Royal Conservatory in Leipzig and later with Désirée Artôt at the Conservatoire de Paris, where she began her association with conductor Anton Seidl. She subsequently engaged with impresario Angelo Neumann's Wagner Opera Company between 1882 and 1883, when she apparently moved to the United States around 1885, joining the Metropolitan Opera Company. After that she traveled back to Berlin where she studied for two more years, adding about thirty other operas to her repertoire.

In 1890, Kronold married with Dutch-born violinist Jan Koert, but divorced him ten years later due to their conflicting professional careers. She worked for many different opera companies, among them the New American Opera Company, the Damrosch German Opera, Gustav Hinrichs Company, the Italian Opera Company, the Royal Opera House, and The Castle Square Opera Company among others. She retired from the stage life in 1904, shortly after engaging herself in charity work, helping thus found and establish the Catholic Oratorio Society of New York in order to bring understanding and promote oratorios in their religious ideal.

She died of pneumonia on 9 October 1920 and was buried at the Mount Pleasant Cemetery, in Hawthorne, Westchester County, New York, US.

== Repertoire ==
- Der Freischütz as Agatha (1877)
- Der Trompeter von Säkkingen as Marie (1889)
- Carmen as Micaëla (1889)
- Cavalleria Rusticana as Santuzza (1891)
- Die Walküre as Helmwige (1891)
- Guillaume Tell as Mathilde (1891)
- Fra Diavolo as Marguerite (1891)
- Il trovatore as Leonora (1891)
- Martha as Lady Harriet Durham (1891)
- La gioconda as La gioconda (1891)
- Aida as Aida (1891)
- Fidelio as Leonore (1891)
- Tannhäuser as Elisabeth (1892) and as Venus (1894)
- L'Africaine as Selika (1892)
- Don Giovanni as Donna Anna (1892) and as Donna Elvira (1896)
- L'amico Fritz as Suzel (1892)
- Un ballo in maschera as Amelia (1892)
- La juive as Rachel (1892)
- Der fliegende Holländer as Senta (1892)
- Faust as Marguerite (1892)
- Les Huguenots as Valentine (1892)
- Le nozze di Figaro as La contessa d’Almaviv (1892)
- Lucrezia Borgia as Donna Lucrezia Borgia (1892)
- I Pagliatti as Nedda (1893)
- Ernani as Elvira (1893)
- Götterdämmerung as Gutrune (1894)
- Gabriella as Gabriella (1894)
- Manon Lescaut as Manon Lescaut (1894)
- Lohengrin as Elsa von Brabant (1895)
- Hänsel und Gretel as Knusperhexe (1895)
- Otello as Desdemona (1896)
- Das Rheingold as Woglinde (1899)
- At the Lower Harbor as Maria (1900)
- The Magic Melody, or Fortunnio's Song as (1900) (Note: According to music critic Jim McPherson in The Opera Quarterly, vol. 18, no. 4 (autumn 2002), p. 524 (The Savage Innocents: Part I, King of the Castle: Henry W. Savage and the Castle Square Opera Company), Jacques Offenbach's Le pont des soupirs was "rejigged" in America as The Magic Melody, or Fortunnio's Song.)
