= Violin Concerto (Beethoven) =

1806 concerto by Beethoven

- by Ludwig van Beethoven
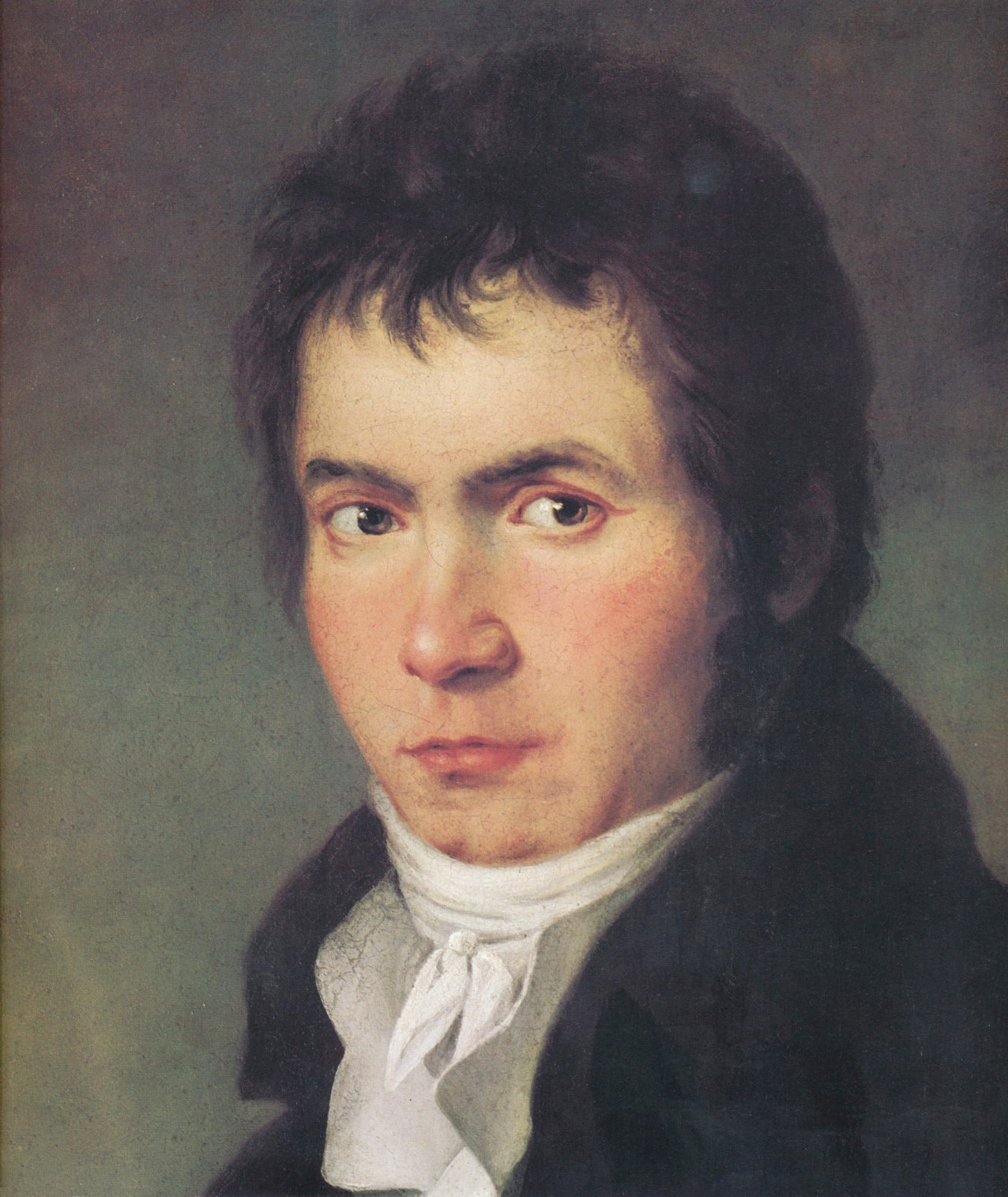
- Key: D major
- Opus: 61(a)
- Period: Classical-Romantic (transitional)
- Genre: Violin concerto
- Composed: 1806
- Dedication: Franz Clement
- Movements: Three

Premiere
- Date: 23 December 1806
- Location: Theater an der Wien, Vienna
- Performers: Franz Clement

The Violin Concerto in D major, Op. 61, was written by Ludwig van Beethoven in 1806. Its first performance by Franz Clement was unsuccessful and for some decades the work languished in obscurity, until revived in 1844 by the then 12-year-old violinist Joseph Joachim with the orchestra of the London Philharmonic Society conducted by Felix Mendelssohn. Joachim would later claim it to be the "greatest" German violin concerto. Since then it has become one of the best-known and regularly performed violin concertos.

== Genesis ==
Beethoven had previously written a number of pieces for violin and orchestra. At some point in 1790–2, before his musical maturity, he began a Violin Concerto in C, of which only a fragment of the first movement survives. Whether the work, or even the first movement, had ever been completed is not known. In any event, it was neither performed nor published. Later in the 1790s, Beethoven had completed two Romances for violin – first the Romance in F and later the Romance in G.

These works show a strong influence from the French school of violin playing, exemplified by violinists such as Giovanni Battista Viotti, Pierre Rode and Rodolphe Kreutzer. The two Romances, for instance, are in a similar style to slow movements of concerti by Viotti. This influence can also be seen in the D major Concerto; the 'martial' opening with the beat of the timpani follows the style of French music at the time, while the prevalence of figures in broken sixths and broken octaves closely resembles elements of compositions by Kreutzer and Viotti.

== Performance history ==
Beethoven wrote the concerto for his colleague Franz Clement, a leading violinist of the day, who had earlier given him helpful advice on his opera Fidelio. The work was premiered on 23 December 1806 in the Theater an der Wien in Vienna, the occasion being a benefit concert for Clement. The first printed edition (1808) was dedicated to Stephan von Breuning.

It is believed that Beethoven finished the solo part so late that Clement had to sight-read part of his performance. Some sources state that Clement interrupted the concerto between the first and second movements with a solo composition of his own, played on one string of the violin held upside down however, other sources claim that he played this piece only at the end of the performance.

The premiere was not a success, and the concerto was little performed in the following decades.

The work was revived in 1844, well after Beethoven's death, with a performance by the then 12-year-old violinist Joseph Joachim with the orchestra of the London Philharmonic Society conducted by Felix Mendelssohn. Ever since, it has been one of the most important works of the violin concerto repertoire, and is frequently performed and recorded today.

== Performance practice ==
It has been said that not only in this piece, but generally, "Recordings demonstrate that ... it was the practice in the early twentieth century to vary the tempo considerably within a movement", and that in the concerto, there is "often one big trough (slowing?) in the central G major passage".

== Music ==
I. Allegro ma non troppo

II. Larghetto

III. Rondo, allegro
Performed by US Marine Chamber Orchestra

The work is in three movements:

1. Allegro ma non troppo (D major)
2. Larghetto (G major)
3. Rondo. Allegro (D major)

It is scored for solo violin, one flute, two oboes, two clarinets in A and C, two bassoons, two horns in D and G, two trumpets in D, timpani, and strings.

=== I. Allegro ma non troppo ===
The movement starts with five beats on the timpani and leads into a theme played by the oboes, clarinets and bassoons. The strings enter with a non-diatonic D# that leads into a V7 chord. The clarinets and bassoons play another theme. This is suddenly interrupted by a louder section in B♭ major. This leads into a theme in D major and later in the parallel minor. The soloist enters with a V7 chord in octaves. This movement is about 21 minutes long.

=== II. Larghetto ===
This movement is in G major. It is about 10 minutes long.

=== III. Rondo. Allegro ===
This movement starts without pause from the second movement. It begins with the famous "hunting horn" theme. There is a section in G minor. After the cadenza, it ends with a typical V-I cadence. This movement is about 10 minutes long.

=== Cadenzas ===
Cadenzas for the work have been written by several notable violinists, including Joachim. The cadenzas by Fritz Kreisler are probably most often employed. More recently, composer Alfred Schnittke provided controversial cadenzas with a characteristically 20th-century style; violinist Gidon Kremer has recorded the concerto with the Schnittke cadenzas. New klezmer-inspired cadenzas written by Montreal-based klezmer clarinetist and composer Airat Ichmouratov for Alexandre Da Costa in 2011 have been recorded by the Taipei Symphony Orchestra for Warner Classics.

The following violinists and composers have written cadenzas:

- Leopold Auer
- Joshua Bell
- Ferruccio Busoni
- Stephanie Chase
- Ferdinand David
- Jakob Dont
- María Dueñas
- Isaak Dunayevsky
- Mischa Elman
- Carl Flesch
- Joseph Hellmesberger Sr.
- Jenő Hubay
- Joseph Joachim
- Patricia Kopatchinskaja
- Fritz Kreisler
- Christiaan Kriens
- Airat Ichmouratov
- Ferdinand Laub
- Hubert Léonard
- Nathan Milstein
- Bernhard Molique
- Miron Polyakin
- Manuel Quiroga
- Camille Saint-Saëns
- Wolfgang Schneiderhan
- Alfred Schnittke
- Sayaka Shoji
- Ödön Singer
- Louis Spohr
- Maxim Vengerov
- Henri Vieuxtemps
- Jörg Widmann
- Henryk Wieniawski
- August Wilhelmj
- Eugène Ysaÿe

== Alternative versions ==
Perhaps due to the Violin Concerto's lack of success at its premiere, and at the request of Muzio Clementi, Beethoven revised it in a version for piano and orchestra, which was later published as Op. 61a. For this version, which is present as a sketch in the Violin Concerto's autograph alongside revisions to the solo part, Beethoven wrote a lengthy first movement cadenza which features the orchestra's timpanist along with the solo pianist. This and the cadenzas for the other movements were later arranged for the violin (and timpani) by Rudolf Kolisch, Max Rostal, Ottokar Nováček, Christian Tetzlaff and Wolfgang Schneiderhan,, Patricia Kopatchinskaja. Gidon Kremer, on his recording with Nikolaus Harnoncourt, adapts these cadenzas for violin, timpani and piano, although the piano does not play in any other parts of the recording. Patricia Kopatchinskaja adapted the cadenza of the first movement for two violins, celli and timpani, for the other movements for violin. Seiji Ozawa also wrote an arrangement for piano. More recently, it has been arranged as a concerto for clarinet and orchestra by Mikhail Pletnev. In 1982, Japanese virtuoso Kazuhito Yamashita recorded his own arrangement as a Guitar Concerto. Robert Bockmühl (1820/21–1881) arranged the solo violin part for cello.

== Recordings ==
The first known recording of Beethoven's violin concerto was made in 1923 for His Master's Voice by violinist Isolde Menges, with Landon Ronald conducting the Royal Albert Hall Orchestra. Hundreds of recordings have been made since, among which the following have received awards and/or outstanding reviews:

- 1925: Josef Wolfsthal, Berlin Staatsoper Orchestra, Hans Thierfelder
- 1934: Bronisław Huberman, Vienna Philharmonic, George Szell Joachim cadenza
- 1940: Jascha Heifetz, NBC Symphony Orchestra, Arturo Toscanini
- 1947: Yehudi Menuhin/Lucerne Festival Orchestra/Wilhelm Furtwängler
- 1953: Wolfgang Schneiderhan, Berlin Philharmonic, Paul van Kempen – "Rosette" by the Penguin Guide
- 1954: David Oistrakh with Sixten Ehrling cond. the Stockholm Festival Orchestra in Stockholm over 10–11 June 1954. Testament CD: "David Oistrakh Beethoven & Sibelius", 1994.
- 1955: Jascha Heifetz, Boston Symphony Orchestra, Charles Munch, RCA Victor – "Mid-price choice" by BBC Radio 3 Building a Library, September 2003
- 1957: Ida Haendel, Czech Philharmonic, Karel Ančerl, Suraphon – 14 May 2010.
- 1959: Isaac Stern, New York Philharmonic, Leonard Bernstein, Sony "Unique cadenza in last movement"
- 1962: Wolfgang Schneiderhan, Berlin Philharmonic, Eugen Jochum, Deutsche Grammophon
- 1974: Arthur Grumiaux, Concertgebouw Orchestra, Colin Davis, Philips – "4 star" by the Penguin Guide
- 1980: Anne-Sophie Mutter, Berlin Philharmonic, Herbert von Karajan, Deutsche Grammophon
- 1980: Itzhak Perlman, Philharmonia Orchestra, Carlo Maria Giulini, EMI – Gramophone Award, 1981
- 1997: Thomas Zehetmair, Orchestra of the Eighteenth Century, Frans Brüggen, Philips – "First choice" by BBC Radio 3 Building a Library, September 2003
- 1999: Hilary Hahn, Baltimore Symphony Orchestra, David Zinman, Sony Classical
- 2006: Isabelle Faust, Prague Philharmonia, Jiří Bělohlávek, Harmonia Mundi – "First choice" by BBC Radio 3 Building a Library, April 2011; Diapason d'Or by Diapason, April 2011
- 2009: Patricia Kopatchinskaja, Orchestre des Champs-Elysées, Philippe Herreweghe, Naïve – BBC Music Magazine Award 2010 (orchestral category)
- 2011: Isabelle Faust, Orchestra Mozart, Claudio Abbado, Harmonia Mundi – "Disc of the Month" by Gramophone, March 2012; "Disc of the Month" by BBC Music Magazine, April 2012; "Diapason d'Or Arte" by Diapason d'Or and Arte; Gramophone Award, 2012; Preis der deutschen Schallplattenkritik; Echo Klassik 2012
- 2018 Christian Tetzlaff, Deutsches Symphonie-Orchester Berlin, Robin Ticciati, Ondine, September 2019
- 2020: Daniel Lozakovich, Munich Philharmonic, Valery Gergiev, Deutsche Grammophon – Cadenza Kleisler, 2020
- 2022: Vilde Frang, Pekka Kuusisto, Deutsche Kammerphilharmonie Bremen – Parlophone Records, 2022
- 2025: Richard Tognetti, Australian Chamber Orchestra (live recording at City Recital Hall November 2018)
