= Jan Koert =

Jan Hendrik (Jan) Koert (6 November 1853, in Rotterdam – 2 February 1911, in Atlantic City) was a Dutch-born musician, a leading solo violinist of his day in America, and concertmaster for some of the world's greatest orchestras.

== Life and career ==
Koert was born in Rotterdam, where he studied the violin. There, in the beginning of the 1880s, he joined the Bilse Orchestra of Ostend as second concertmaster. After moving to Paris, he briefly joined the Anton Rubinstein Quintet with which he toured Europe. In June 1889, he moved to the United States where he played with the Theodore Thomas Orchestra of Chicago. The following year, he married Moritz Moszkowski's cousin, Polish pianist and soprano Selma Kronold (1861–1921), but divorced her after ten years of married life due to their conflicting careers.

Koert also played with the Seidl and Damrosch Orchestras of New York. In 1892, he began studying at the National Conservatory of Music in New York, which at the time was directed by Antonin Dvorak, and playing second violin with Adolph Brodsky of the Brodsky String Quartet. Between 1894 and 1898, he joined the New York Symphony Orchestra, and from 1900 to 1908 the violin section of the Philadelphia Orchestra, where he became second concertmaster in his second season, and principal viola for the remaining six seasons. He died in Atlantic City on 2 February 1911.
