= La Grande Bretèche =

Short story by Honoré de Balzac

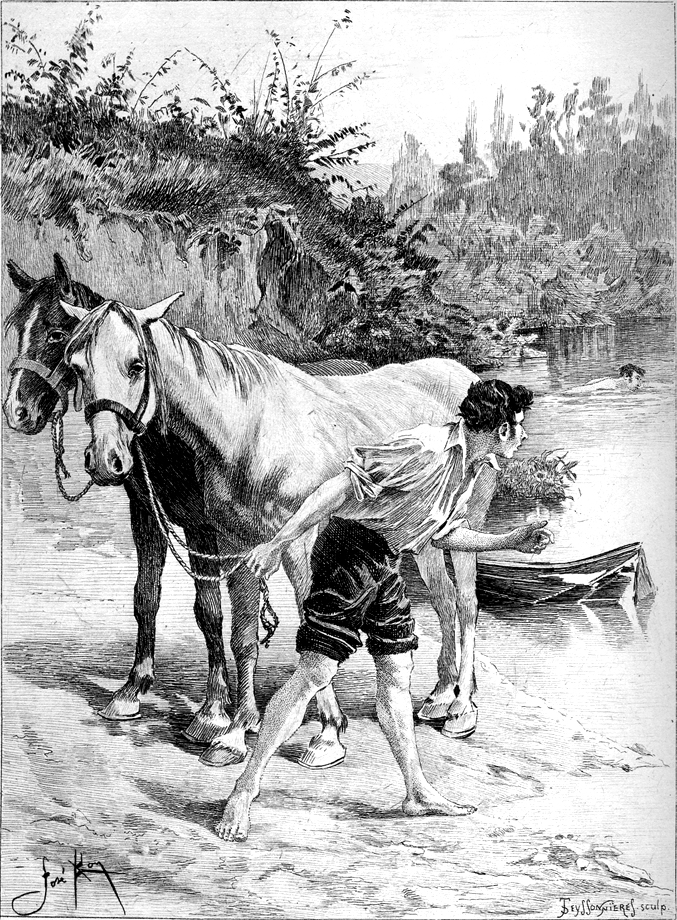
- Author: Honoré de Balzac
- Language: French
- Series: La Comédie Humaine
- Publication date: 1831
- Publication place: France
- Preceded by: Le Message
- Followed by: La Grenadière

La Grande Bretèche is a short story by Honoré de Balzac published in 1831. It is one of the Scènes de la vie privée of La Comédie humaine.

== Plot ==
Dr. Horace Bianchon discovers near the town of Vendôme an abandoned manor: La Grande Bretèche. Intrigued by the ruins, the doctor tries unsuccessfully to enter the house night after night. Upon returning to the inn where he is staying, he questions the locals about the house. Finally several locals, including a lawyer and the innkeeper, explain the story of the manor.

Madame de Merret, the late owner of the manor, forbade anyone from entering the house upon her death, be it workmen, visitors, or government officials, for 50 years. The lawyer was given the task, as well as funds, to ensure that her dying wish be accomplished.

Dr. Bianchon learned that Madame de Merret had a Spanish lover for a short period of her life. One day, Madame de Merret's husband returned early from a business trip when her lover was at the house. The lover hid himself in the closet, but the husband, hearing a sound, confronted his wife about the noise. Pressured by her suspicious husband, Madame de Merret swore upon a crucifix that there was no one in the closet, but threatened in turn to leave her husband if he were ever to open the closet out of suspicion. In response, Monsieur de Merret sent for a mason to wall up the closet, trapping the lover inside. Terrified, Madame de Merret passed along a message to the mason asking him to break a hole in the door when her husband was not looking before completely walling the closet off. The mason does that, and Madame de Merret catches a final glimpse of the maddened eyes of her lover through the hole. Once the closet was walled up completely, Madame and Monsieur de Merret stay in the bedroom for several days, listening to the muffled noise coming from the closet. Because of this traumatic experience, Madame de Merret declared her house off-limits upon her death.

== Adaptations ==
- 1901 : The Duchess at Prayer, by Edith Wharton, contained in her short story collection Crucial Instances.
- 1909 : La Grande Bretèche, Film d'Art, directed by André Calmettes, with Véra Sergine, André Calmettes, and Henri Pouctal, produced by Pathé Frères.
- 1913 : Le Chateau de la Breteche, Opera, based on the story by Honoré de Balzac, by Albert Dupuis, published in 1913 by Eschig, Paris.
- 1943 : Un seul amour, film directed by Pierre Blanchar, with Micheline Presle.
- 1944 : The Niche of Doom, episode of The Weird Circle radio show.
- 1947 : La Grande Bretéche, Opera by Avery Claflin, libretto by George R. Mills based on the story by Honoré de Balzac. The opera was recorded in 1956 and is commercially available for purchase.
- 1973 : La Grande Bretèche, episode of Orson Welles' Great Mysteries directed by Peter Sasdy, with Orson Welles, Peter Cushing, and Susannah York.
- 1993 : The Mysterious Mansion, radio play, first broadcast 7 October 1993 on BBC Radio 4, adapted by Peter Mackie and directed by David Hunter, starring David Calder.

== Bibliography ==
- Pierrick Brient, « L’amant muré, à propos de la Grande Bretèche de Balzac », Savoirs et Clinique n° 9, Ramonville Ste Agne, Eres, 2008 ISBN 978-2-7492-0922-7.
- Nicole Célestin, « La Grande Bretèche : Tradition orale, souvenirs livresques, cadre tourangeau », L'Année balzacienne, Paris, Garnier, 1964, p. 197-203.
- Lucienne Frappier-Mazur, « Lecture d’un texte illisible : Autre étude de femme et le modèle de la conversation », MLN, May 1983, n° 98 (4), p. 712-27.
- Henri Godin, « Le Cadran solaire de La Grande Bretèche », L’Année balzacienne, Paris, Garnier Frères, 1967, p. 346-9.
- (in English) Peter Lock, « Text Crypt », MLN, May 1982, n° 97 (4), p. 872-89.
- Chantal Massol-Bedoin, « Transfert d’écriture : le réemploi de La Grande Bretèche dans Autre étude de femme », Balzac, Œuvres complètes : Le Moment de La Comédie humaine, Saint-Denis, PU de Vincennes, 1993 p. 203-16.
- A.-W. Raitt, « Notes sur la genèse de La Grande Bretèche », L’Année balzacienne, Paris, Garnier, 1964, p. 187-96.
- Marie-Laure Ryan, « Narration, génération, transformation : La Grande Bretèche de Balzac », L’Esprit Créateur, 1977, n° 17, p. 195-210.
- Scott Sprenger, "Balzac's La Grande Breteche", . Originally published in Masterplots II: Short Story, Pasadena, Salem Press, 1996, 3313–15.
- Mario Lavagetto, La macchina dell'errore. Storia di una lettura, Torino, Einaudi, 1996.
