= Franz Clement =

Austrian musician

Franz Joseph Clement (November 17, 1780 – November 3, 1842), was an Austrian violinist, pianist, composer, conductor of Vienna's Theater an der Wien, and a friend of Ludwig van Beethoven.

== Life and career ==
A talented violinist from a young age, he was known for his extraordinary ability to play complex pieces from memory after only briefly viewing them. He would alternate his virtuoso performances with lighthearted showmanship, with such intermission antics as playing a sonata on one string with the violin upside-down. A critic in 1805 described his unique style as follows:

"His is not the marked, bold, strong playing, the moving, forceful Adagio, the powerful bow and tone which characterise the Rode-Viotti School; rather, his playing is indescribably delicate, neat and elegant; it has an extremely delightful tenderness and cleanness that undoubtedly secures him a place among the most perfect violinists. At the same time, he has a wholly individual lightness, which makes it seem as if he merely toys with the most incredible difficulties, and a sureness that never deserts him for a moment, even in the most daring passages."

Beethoven became acquainted with Clement in 1794 when he attended a performance in Vienna by the prodigy, then just 14.

It was at the Theater an der Wien's benefit concert of April 7, 1805 that Beethoven first publicly conducted his Eroica symphony. At the same performance, Clement premiered his own violin concerto in D Major, one of Clement's six known violin concertos.

Clement went on to commission Beethoven's Violin Concerto in D major from his friend for the next benefit concert, given on December 23, 1806. It is said that Beethoven worked on it up until shortly before the performance, and that Clement played the piece without rehearsing.

His works include, besides a number of compositions for violin and piano or orchestra, an offertorium "Ave, o rosa mistica" published in 1848.

== Recordings ==
- Violin Concerto in D major by Franz Clement. Paired with the Violin Concerto in D major, Op. 61, by Ludwig van Beethoven. Rachel Barton Pine (violin), José Serebrier (conductor), Royal Philharmonic Orchestra. Cedille Records: CDR 90000 106 (info)
- Violin Concertos Nos. 1 – 2. Mirijam Contzen (Violin), WDR Symfonieorchester, Reinhard Goebel (conductor). Sony Masterworks, 2019.
- Variations for Solo Violin on Gretry's opera "Barbe Bleu". Aaron Shorr (piano), Peter Sheppard Skærved (violin) Beethoven Explored Vol 3 MSV 72005

== Sources ==
- Short bio by Betsy Schwarm
- (See final page.)
