= A basso porto =

Opera by Niccola Spinelli

- Opera by Niccola Spinelli
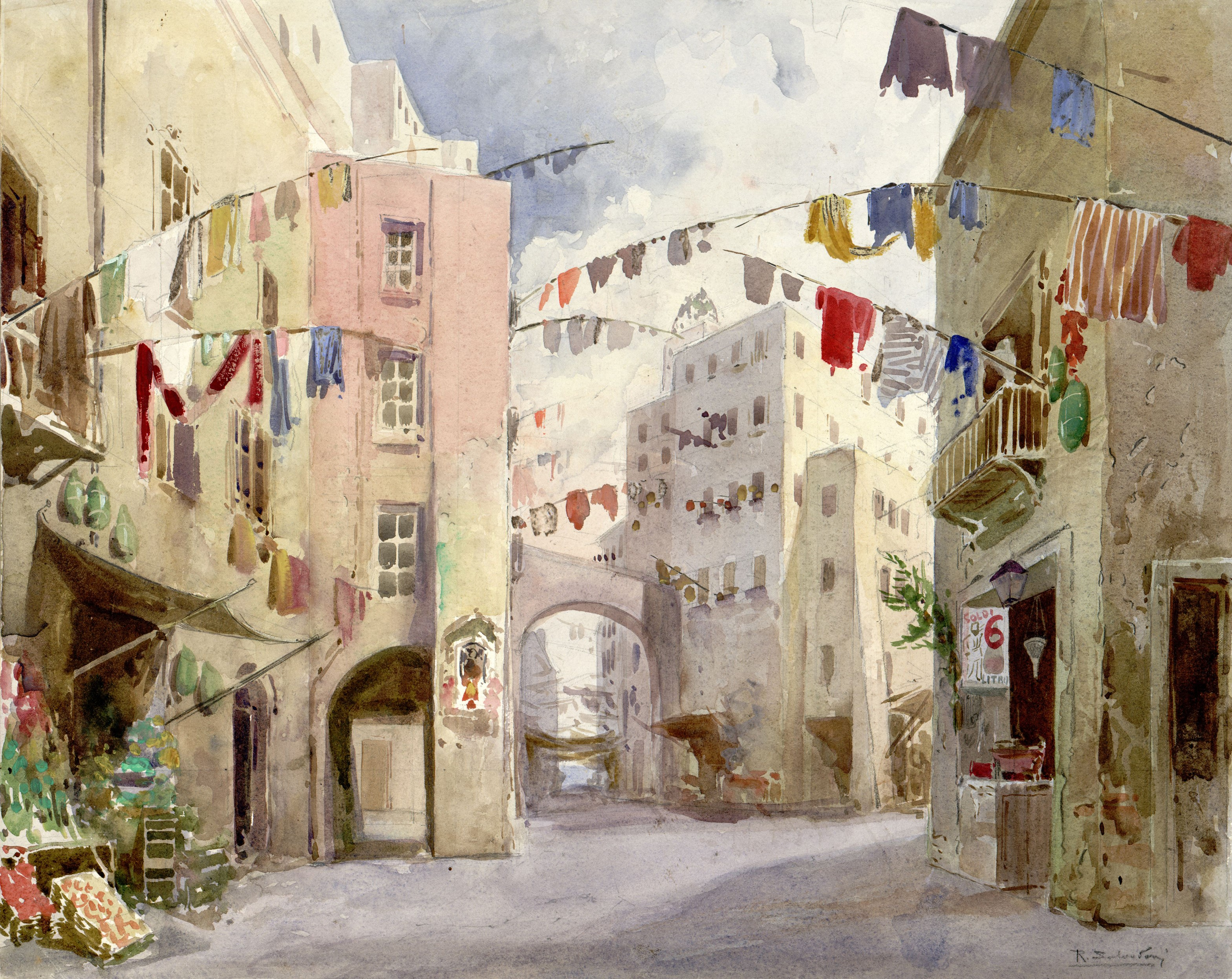
- Act I set design by Riccardo Salvadori for the première
- Librettist: Eugene Checchi
- Language: Italian
- Premiere: 18 April 1894; Cologne Opera

A basso porto (At the Lower Harbor) is an opera in three acts by composer Niccola Spinelli. The opera uses an Italian language libretto by Eugene Checchi which is based on Goffredo Cognetti's 1889 play O voto. The opera premiered to critical success at the Cologne Opera on April 18, 1894, sung in a German translation by Ludwig Hartmann and Otto Hess. The work is widely considered Spinelli's greatest composition, and the prelude to the opera's third act has been programmed by numerous orchestras for performances in concert.

== Performance history ==
A basso porto was first performed in England by the Carl Rosa Co. in March 1899 at Brighton, and by the Queen's Hall Orchestra on October 11, 1900, under Henry Wood. The opera focuses on the slums of Naples, where Spinelli used mandolins and guitars in several places in his orchestral score. The mandolinists were Florimond and Cesare Costers. The mandolins were an important part of the opera, accompanying the tenor song of the second act, and the finale of the third act. Spinelli composed an Intermezzo for mandolins and orchestra, as a prelude to the third and last act, a departure from the customary instrumentation. Philip J. Bone said that the audience reaction to the Intermezzo "was extraordinary." Bone, a music historian, added more detail about the use of mandolins by Spinelli, saying, "Spinelli makes good use of the mandolins, writing an elaborate cadenza in double stopping and rapid chromatic passages, which evidences a practical acquaintance with the instrument." He also said that the parts of the Intermezzo that were written for mandolins were the sections most striking feature of the Intermezzo, along with the melody written for cello.

The work was staged on Broadway by Henry W. Savage's Castle Square Opera Company in an English-language production entitled At the Lower Harbor in 1900. The Broadway production premiered at the American Theatre on January 22, 1900, and ran for a total of eight performances. The musical forces were led by conductor Romualdo Sapio and the production starred Selma Kronold as Maria, William Pruette as Ciccillo, Mary Carrington as Sesella, Harry Davies as Luigino, Herman Brand as Pichillo, and Frank H. Belcher as Pascale.

== Roles ==
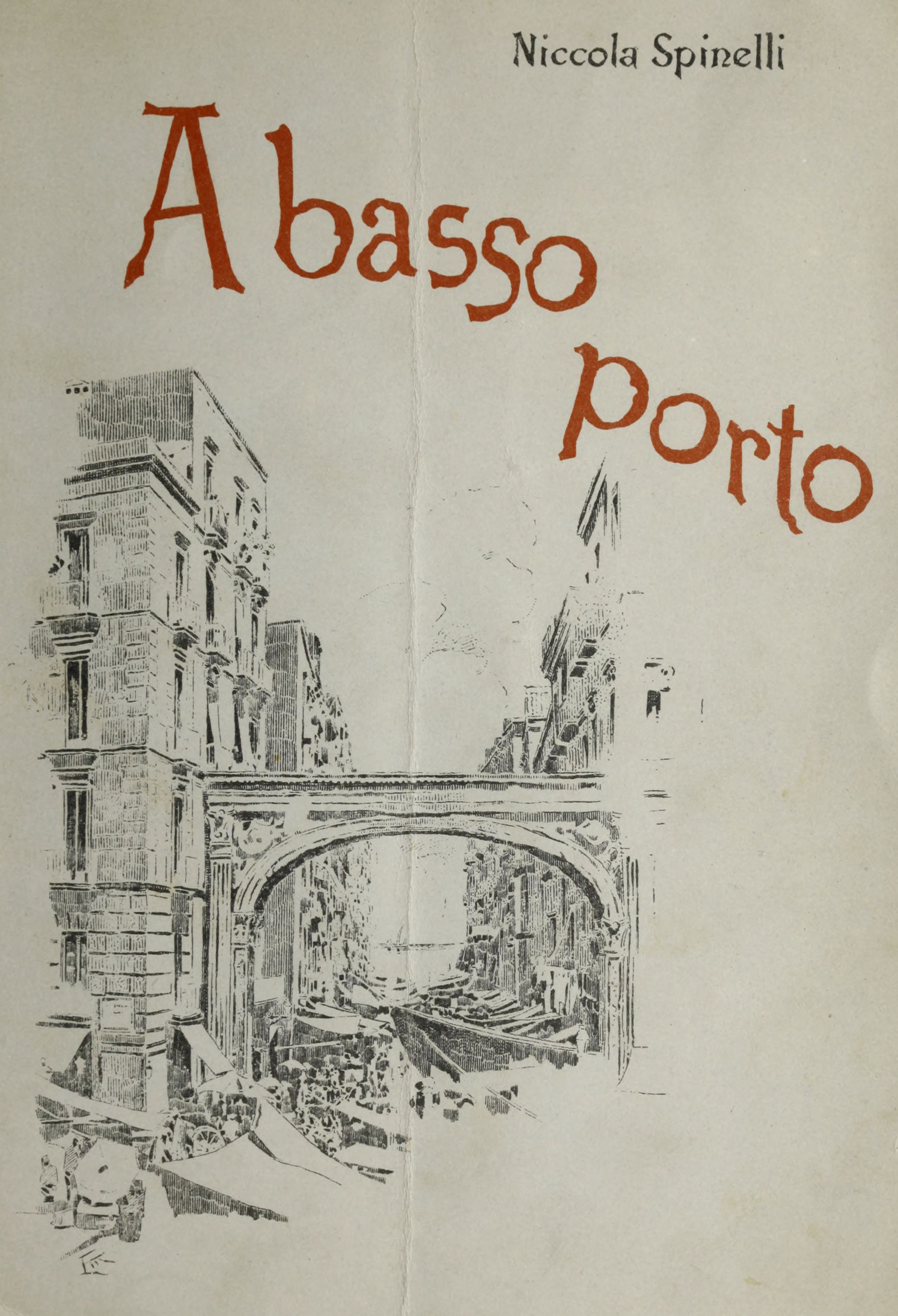
Cover to the 1895 printing of the opera A Basso Porto, music by Niccola Spinelli.

Role	Voice type	Premiere cast, 18 April 1894 (Conductor: Josef Grossmann)
Maria	soprano	Franziska Burrian-Jelinek
Sesella, Maria's daughter	soprano	Fanny Moran-Olden
Luigino, Maria's brother	tenor	Oreste Gennari
Pichillo	tenor	Oscar Braun
Ciccillo	baritone	Wilhelm Fricke
Pascale	bass	Luigi Broglio
