= Albert Dupuis =

Belgian composer

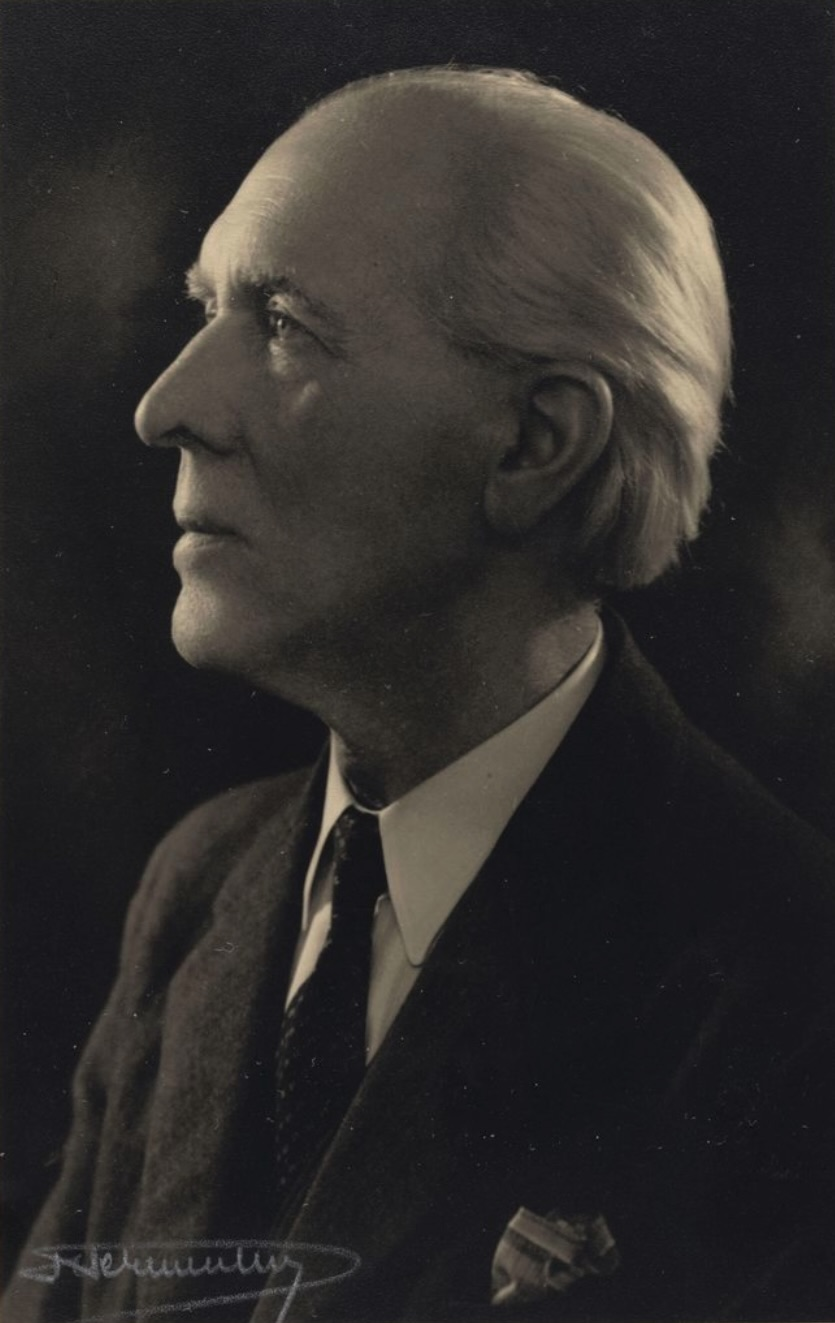

Background information
- Born: 1 March 1877; Verviers, Belgium
- Died: 19 September 1967 (aged 90) Brussels, Belgium
- Genres: Classical
- Occupation: Composer
- Website: www.albertdupuis.com

Albert Dupuis (1 March 1877 – 19 September 1967) was a Belgian composer.

== Biography ==
Albert Dupuis was born in Verviers on 1 March 1877. The son of a music teacher, Dupuis studied the finesses of the violin, the piano and the flute from the age of 8, at the conservatory in his hometown, Verviers, where Guillaume Lekeu, composer of classical music, and Henri Vieuxtemps, composer and violinist, had also taken residence. Orphaned at age 15, he worked as a tutor at the Grand Theatre of Verviers while pursuing his studies, including from Francis Duyzings for harmony. As he was a brilliant and precocious student, he composed his first comic opera already at the age of 18.

Noticed by the French composer and teacher Vincent d'Indy in 1897, Dupuis was invited to work with him at the Schola Cantorum in Paris. He was for a time the coach of the choir of Saint-Eustache, but in 1900 he returned to Verviers to marry. In 1903 he won the Prix de Rome Belgium (not to be confused with the French Prix de Rome) with his cantata La Chanson d'Halewyn and on 5 March his opera Jean-Michel premiered at La Monnaie, the Royal Theatre of the Mint in Brussels.

Appointed conductor of the Theatre of Ghent in 1905, he withdrew when the season was completed, to devote himself to composition. But when in 1907 the council of Verviers offered him the post of director at the conservatory, he accepted and held it until his retirement in 1947.

During his lifetime, his works met with some success in Brussels and in the major cities in Belgium (particularly in Flanders) and France. In particular his opera La Passion, played more than 150 times at La Monnaie and he directed it several times. He also enjoyed the esteem of his peers, as Eugène Ysaÿe, dedicated of several of his works and who made his works known in the United States.

=== Legacy ===
Two of Dupuis' daughters, Gislène (cello) and Irene (violin), were eminent concert musicians. A street is named after him in the village of Stembert.

== Characteristics of his works ==
He became a follower of the School of César Franck through his instructor d'Indy. Nevertheless, his style approaches much de style of Gabriel Fauré and his music can be styled as impressionistic. He was essentially an opera composer (having composed fifteen), and all his works are imbued with a lyrical feeling.

== Major works ==
- About twenty pieces for piano:

- Suite champêtre (éd. Cranz, Bruxelles)
  - Pièces paradoxales, 1923 (éd. Bayard-Nizet, Stavelot)
- Two string quartets;
- Two trios for strings, violoncello and piano
- Five pieces for strings and piano, among them:
  - Sonate pour violon et piano, 1922 (éd. Senart, Paris)
- Eleven pieces for alto and piano
- Four pieces for violoncello and orchestra, among them:
  - Concerto pour violoncelle (manuscrit)
  - Légende, 1909
- Six pieces for piano and orchestra, among them:
  - Concerto pour piano
- Nine pieces for violin and orchestra, among them:
  - Concerto pour violon
  - Fantaisie rhapsodique, 1906 (éd. Schott, Bruxelles)
- More than thirty orchestral works, among them:
  - two symphonies
  - four Symphonic poems
- More than thirty melodies, among them:
  - A collection of 12 melodies (éd. Schott, Bruxelles et éd. Katto, Bruxelles)
- Five cantatas, among them:
  - La Chanson d’Halewyn (The Song of Halewyn), 1903 (éd. Eschig, Paris)
- Five oratorios
- Eight ballets
- Fifteen works for voice and orchestra
- Fifteen operas, among them:
  - Jean-Michel, 1900 (éd. Breitkopf et Härtel, Leipzig)
  - Fidélaine, 1908-1909 (éd. Breitkopf et Härtel, Leipzig)
  - La Grande Bretèche, 1911-1912 (d’après Balzac) (éd. Eschig, Paris)
  - La Passion, 1912-1914 (éd. Chouden, Paris)

== The Albert Dupuis collection ==
After the death of Albert Dupuis, a collection was created by his descendants, who later donated it to the King Baudouin Foundation in order to ensure its preservation. In December 2022, the King Baudouin Foundation entrusted the collection to the Royal Library of Belgium, where it became part of the collections of the Music Division.

The Albert Dupuis collection consists mainly of printed and manuscript scores of the composer's works, manuscript librettos, press clippings, concert programs, photographs, and correspondence covering his entire career (letters from Eugène Ysaÿe, Vincent d'Indy, Edgar Tinel and Octave Maus), notes by Dupuis taken during d'Indy's course at the Schola Cantorum in 1897, as well as a few objects, including the composer's conducting stick.

== Bibliography ==
- Dor (Jacques), Albert Dupuis, Notices biographiques et critiques, Imprimerie Bénard, Liège, 1935.
- La Grande Bretêche d’Albert Dupuis, Gazette de Cologne, 5 avril 1913
- R. Michel, Un grand musicien Belge méconnu, Albert Dupuis, Éditeur Cons. de musique, Verviers, 1967.

== Selected works ==
Viola

- Aria for Viola and Piano or Orchestra
- Chanson affectueuse for Viola and Piano
- Chant d’adieu for Viola and Piano (1932)
- Chant du retour for Viola and Piano
- Chopin for Viola and Piano
- Evocation d’orient for Viola (or Violin) and Piano
- Grieg for Viola and Piano
- La jeune fille au rouet for Viola and Piano
- Méditation for Viola and Piano
- Mendelssohn for Viola and Piano (1933)
- Petite Variation for Viola and Piano
- Schumann for Viola and Piano
