= Christiaan Kriens =

American classical composer

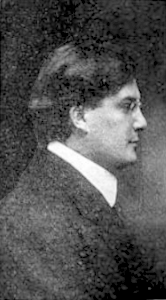
- In The Musical Observer, June 1920
- Born: Christiaan Pieter Wilhelm Kriens; April 29, 1881; Dresden, Germany
- Died: December 17, 1934 (aged 53); Hartford, Connecticut, US
- Education: Haagse Muziekschool
- Occupation(s): Composer, pianist, violinist, conductor

Christiaan Pieter Wilhelm Kriens (April 29, 1881 – December 17, 1934) was an American composer, pianist, violinist and conductor of Dutch parentage.

He was born in Germany while his father, clarinetist Christiaan Pieter Willem Kriens, was playing with the Sächsische Staatskapelle in Dresden during the 1880/1881 season. he came to the United States in 1906. He wrote a number of pieces for orchestra, including two symphonies (when he was very young); he also composed songs and some chamber music, including a string quartet.

He received his education from his father and at the Haagse Muziekschool. When he was fourteen he gave a concert with the orchestra led by his father, during which he was the violin soloist in the Violin Concerto by Ludwig van Beethoven, and the pianist the Piano Concerto No. 5 by the same composer and led his own second symphony as a conductor. He became solo violinist in the Haarlemse Orkest Vereeniging (predecessor of Noordhollands Philharmonisch Orkest) before joining orchestras in France and the United States. He ran an orchestra school in Carnegie Hall (Kriens Symphony Club) and a string quartet.

In November 1910, Musical America published an interview with Kriens with the headline: "No Wealth, No Friends, No Influence, Yet Optimistic".

He became musical director of WTIC, a radio station with choir and orchestra, in West Hartford, Connecticut. When he was fired, he killed himself at his home in Hartford on December 17, 1934.
