= Niccola Spinelli =

Italian opera composer

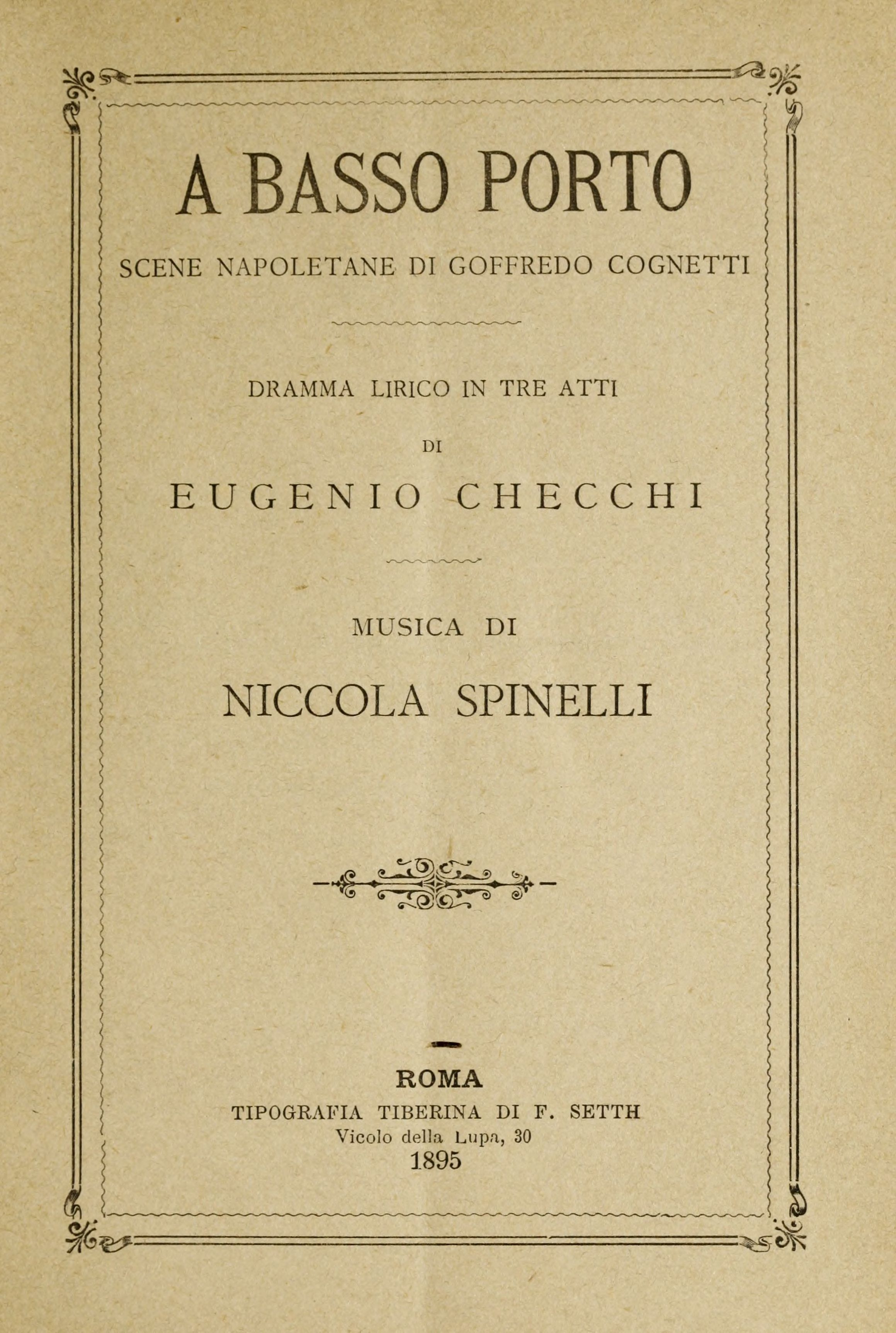
- Title page of the opera A basso porto, 1895
- Born: 29 July 1865; Turin, Italy
- Died: 17 October 1909 (aged 44); Rome, Italy
- Occupation: Composer

Niccola Spinelli (29 July 1865 – 17 October 1909) was an Italian composer of operas.

Born in Turin, the son of a jurist, he studied composition at the Naples Conservatory under Paolo Serrao. His opera Labilia won the second-place prize in an 1890 opera competition organized by Milanese music publisher Edoardo Sonzogno, and premiered in Rome on 9 May 1890; the first prize went to Pietro Mascagni for Cavalleria rusticana.

His most well-known work is A basso porto (At the Lower Harbor), which premiered in Cologne on 18 April 1894 to great popular acclaim. A basso porto was first performed in England by the Carl Rosa Co. in March 1899 at Brighton, and by the Queen's Hall Orchestra on 11 October 1900, under Henry Wood. The opera focuses on the slums of Naples, where Spinelli used mandolins and guitars in several places in his orchestral score. The mandolinists were Florimond and Cesare Costers. The mandolins were an important part of the opera, accompanying the tenor song of the second act, and the finale of the third act. More importantly, Spinelli composed an intermezzo for mandolins and orchestra, as a prelude to the third and last act, a departure from the customary instrumentation. Philip J. Bone said that the audience reaction to the intermezzo "was extraordinary". Bone, a music historian, added more detail about the use of mandolins by Spinelli, saying, "Spinelli makes good use of the mandolins, writing an elaborate cadenza in double stopping and rapid chromatic passages, which evidences a practical acquaintance with the instrument." He also said that the parts of the intermezzo that were written for mandolins were the sections most striking feature of the intermezzo, along with the melody written for cello.

Spinelli died in Rome, aged 44.
