= 2012 Queen Elisabeth Music Competition =

The 2012 Queen Elisabeth Music Competition is the competition's 50th edition, comprising its 17th Eugène Ysaÿe Violin Competition and its 19th Composition Competition.

The violin competition took place between 30 April and 26 May 2012 in Brussels' Centre for Fine Arts. Andrey Baranov won it to become the first Russian violinist to do so since the collapse of the Soviet Union, while Tatsuki Narita and Su-shin Hyun were awarded the silver and bronze medals.

== Violin competition ==
=== Jury ===
- (Belgium) Arie van Lysebeth (chairman)
- (France) Pierre Amoyal
- (France) Augustin Dumay
- (France) Patrice Fontanarosa
- (United Kingdom) Daniel Hope
- (Taiwan) Hu Nai-yuan
- (United States) Lewis Kaplan
- (South Korea) Kim Min
- (Belgium) Philippe Koch
- (Belgium) Shirly Laub
- (Romania) Mihaela Martin
- (Russia) Natalia Prischepenko
- (Russia) Tatiana Samouil
- (Japan) Akiko Suwanai
- (China) Vera Tsu Weiling

=== Results ===
Contestant	R1	SF	F
(Russia) Andrey Baranov			Gold medal
(Japan) Tatsuki Narita			Silver medal
(South Korea) Su-shin Hyun			Bronze medal
(United States) Esther Yoo			4th
(Taiwan) Yu-Chien Tseng			5th
(Belarus) Artem Shishkov			6th
(Albania) Ermir Abeshi			Lrt.
(Belgium) Marc Bouchkov			Lrt.
(Canada) Nikki Chooi			Lrt.
(South Korea) Dami Kim			Lrt.
(Czech Republic) Josef Špaček			Lrt.
(United States) Nancy Zhou			Lrt.
(South Korea) Ga-hyun Cho			
(South Korea) Jin-joo Cho			
(France) Kristi Gjezi			
(Finland) Petteri Iivonen			
(South Korea) Bomsori Kim			
(Kazakhstan) Erzhan Kulibaev			
(South Korea) Marisol Lee			
(Taiwan) Richard Lin			
(France) Maria Milstein			
(Russia) Lev Solodovnikov			
(Russia) Valentina Svyatlovskaya			
(Romania) Stefan Tarara			
(Germany) Lea Birringer			
(France) Radu Bitica			
(Netherlands) Birthe Blom			
(Latvia) Elina Buksha			
(France) Louise Chisson			
(United States) Stefani Collins			
(Belgium) Claire Dassesse			
(Romania) Cristian Fatu			
(Switzerland) Elena Graf			
(South Korea) Soo-jin Han			
(Argentina) Xavier Inchausti			
(South Korea) Yoojin Jang			
(Japan) Aiko Kamishikiryo			
(Armenia) Haik Kazazyan			
(South Korea) Fabiola Kim			
(South Korea) Jae-young Kim			
(South Korea) Jee-won Kim			
(South Korea) Soh-yon Kim			
(Japan) Yu Kurokawa			
(Australia) Harriet Langley			
(South Korea) Hyun-woong Lee			
(South Korea) Myung-eun Lee			
(Germany) Maria-Elisabeth Lott			
(Belgium) Jolente de Maeyer			
(Russia) Sergey Malov			
(Czech Republic) Matouš Michal			
(Czech Republic) Simon Michal			
(Canada) Boson Mo			
(Japan) Daichi Nakamura			
(Japan) Ami Oike			
(Bulgaria) Liya Petrova			
(Russia) Igor Pikayzen			
(Estonia) Mari Poll			
(Russia) Aylen Pritchin			
(Canada) Stanislav Pronin			
(Russia) Yury Revich			
(Canada) Michelle Ross			
(Belgium) Eugenia Ryabinina			
(Greece) Arsenis Selalmazidis			
(Ukraine) Oleksii Semenenko			
(United States) Emma Steele			
(Japan) Mai Suzuki			
(France) Julien Szulman			
(United States) Stephen Tavani			
(France) Gabriel Tchalik			
(United States) Suliman Tekalli			
(Ukraine) Diana Tishchenko			
(Norway) Christopher Tun Andersen			
(Dominica) Yuuki Wong			
(South Korea) Jung-yoon Yang			
(South Korea) Sulki Yu			
(Latvia) Laura Zariņa			
(China) Yuqing Zhang			

== Composition competition ==
The first prize in the composition competition was awarded to French composer Michel Petrossian for his concerto for piano and orchestra 'In the Wake of Ea'.
