= III Sendai International Music Competition =

The III Sendai International Music Competition took place in Sendai from May 18-June 24, 2007.

== Violin Competition ==
=== Palmares ===
	Winner
1st Prize	(Russia) Alena Baeva
2nd Prize	(United States) Erin Keefe
3rd Prize	(South Korea) A-Rah Shin
4th Prize	(Russia) Andrey Baranov
5th Prize	(Japan) Sayaka Chiba
6th Prize	(Japan) Haruka Nagao
Audience Prizes	(Japan) Haruka Nagao
	(Russia) Alena Baeva
	(United States) Erin Keefe

=== Jury ===
  - (Japan) Tomotada Soh (chairman)
  - (Japan) Kiyoshi Okayama (vice-chairman)
  - (France) Gérard Poulet (vice-chairman)
  - (Germany) Daniel Gaede
  - (Japan) Yuzuko Horigome
  - (United States) Lewis Kaplan
  - (South Korea) Nam-Yun Kim
  - (Poland) Konstanty Kulka
  - (Russia) Victor Pikayzen
  - (Norway) Arve Tellefsen
  - (China) Lina Yu

=== Competition results ===
==== Elimination round ====
May 20–22.

  - (South Korea) A-Rah Shin - 86.70
  - (Russia) Alena Baeva - 84.55
  - (United States) Erin Keefe - 81.91
  - (China) Zhijiong Wang - 81.40
  - (China) Shanshan Yao - 80.82
  - (Japan) Haruka Nagao - 80.40
  - (Japan) Aya Kiyonaga - 79.70
  - (Russia) Andrey Baranov - 78.73
  - (Japan) Sayaka Chiba - 78.40
  - (South Korea) Minjeong Suh - 78.40
  - (Japan) Aska Kawamata - 78.00
  - (United States) Hannah Choi - 77.91
  - (Japan) Momoko Arai
  - (Germany) Lea Birringer
  - (Japan) Sakura Chiba
  - (Russia) Aleksandra Fedotova
  - (Japan) Yusuke Hayashi
  - (Japan) Samika Honda
  - (Japan) Tadasuke Ijima
  - (France) Hayato Ishibashi
  - (United States) Jason Issokson
  - (Japan) Fuyu Iwaki
  - (Russia) Maxim Kosinov
  - (Ukraine) Yevgeniy Kostrytskyy
  - (Russia) Dmitry Lukin
  - (Poland) Maria Machowska
  - (Russia) Svetlana Makarova
  - (Russia) Sergey Malov
  - (Israel) Tomer Marcus
  - (Portugal) Pedro Meireles
  - (Japan) Tsuyoshi Moriya
  - (Israel) Kinneret Sieradzki
  - (Russia) Vladimir Soluianov
  - (Japan) Eri Takamura
  - (Romania) Eugen Tichindeleanu
  - (Spain) Gerardo Ubaghs
  - (China) Xu Yang
  - (Japan) Asami Yamada
  - (Japan) Masanobu Yoda
  - (Japan) Kosuke Yoshikawa

==== Semifinals ====
May 26–28.

  - (United States) Erin Keefe - 88.64
  - (Russia) Andrey Baranov - 87.91
  - (Russia) Alena Baeva - 83.09
  - (South Korea) Shin A-Rah - 82.80
  - (Japan) Haruka Nagao - 78.90
  - (Japan) Sayaka Chiba - 78.90
  - (China) Shanshan Yao - 78.73
  - (China) Zhijiong Wang - 77.80
  - (Japan) Aya Kiyonaga - 73.90
  - (United States) Hannah Choi - 73.55
  - (Japan) Aska Kawamata - 72.27
  - (South Korea) Minjeong Suh - 70.00

==== Finals ====
June 1–2

  - 1st Prize
  - (Russia) Alena Baeva - 6 votes
  - (United States) Erin Keefe - 2 votes
  - (Japan) Sayaka Chiba - 1 vote
  - 2nd Prize
  - (United States) Erin Keefe - 5 votes
  - (South Korea) Shin A-Rah - 2 votes
  - (Russia) Andrey Baranov - 1 vote
  - (Japan) Haruka Nagao - 1 vote
  - 3rd Prize
  - (South Korea) Shin A-Rah - 5 votes
  - (Russia) Andrey Baranov - 4 votes
  - 4th Prize
  - (Russia) Andrey Baranov - 4 votes
  - (Japan) Sayaka Chiba - 3 votes
  - (Japan) Haruka Nagao - 3 votes
  - 5th Prize
  - (Japan) Sayaka Chiba - 6 votes
  - (Japan) Haruka Nagao - 4 votes

== Piano Competition ==
=== Palmares ===
	Winner
1st Prize	(Japan) Yuya Tsuda
2nd Prize	(Taiwan) Yi-Chih Lu
3rd Prize	(Russia) Oxana Shevchenko
4th Prize	(Russia) Ilya Ovchinnikov
5th Prize	(Hong Kong) Ka-Ling Colleen Lee
6th Prize	(Russia) Vyacheslav Gryaznov
Audience Prizes	(Russia) Alexander Osminin
	(Russia) Oxana Shevchenko
	(Japan) Yuya Tsuda

=== Jury ===
- (Japan) Minoru Nojima (chairman)
- (Japan) Katsumi Ueda (vice-chairman)
- (Germany) Peter Rösel (vice-chairman)
- (Netherlands) Willem Brons
- (South Korea) Daejin Kim
- (Japan) Michie Koyama
- (France) Dominique Merlet
- (France) Cécile Ousset
- (Georgia (country)) (Russia) Elisso Virsaladze
- (Russia) (United States) Oxana Yablonskaya
- (China) Guangren Zhou

=== Competition results ===
==== Elimination round ====
June 10–12.

  - (Hong Kong) Ka-Ling Colleen Lee - 91.27
  - (Russia) Ilya Ovchinnikov - 87.82
  - (Japan) Yuya Tsuda - 87.64
  - (Taiwan) Yi-Chih Lu - 85.73
  - (Russia) Vyacheslav Gryaznov - 85.45
  - (Russia) Alexander Osminin - 85.20
  - (Taiwan) Brian Hsu - 85.09
  - (Japan) Yoshihiro Nagase - 81.64
  - (Georgia (country)) (Russia) Shorena Tsintsavadze - 81.55
  - (Russia) Oxana Shevchenko - 81.18
  - (Germany) Esther Birringer - 81.00
  - (United States) Megumi Shimanuki - 80.50
  - (Japan) Ainobu Ota - 80.30
  - (Italy) Angelo Arciglione
  - (Hungary) László Borbely
  - (China) Moye Chen
  - (Hungary) Árpád Dányi
  - (United States) Tanya Gabrielian
  - (China) Jing Gong
  - (France) Cyril Guillotin
  - (United States) Christopher Guzmán
  - (China) Duanduan Hao
  - (Japan) Shinnosuke Inugai
  - (Japan) Kazuo Irie
  - (Japan) Chie Kamino
  - (Japan) Jun Kaneko
  - (Russia) Alexander Karpeyev
  - (Japan) Takuro Maeda
  - (Japan) Maiko Mine
  - (Ukraine) Olga Monakh
  - (Japan) Koki Murata
  - (United States) Sandra Nam
  - (Japan) Takaya Sano
  - (Armenia) (United States) Nina Sarapyan
  - (United States) Anna Shakina
  - (China) Jia Shi
  - (Japan) Yuki Sunamura
  - (United States) Hsiang Tu

==== Semifinals ====
June 16–18.

  - (Russia) Oxana Shevchenko - 88.73
  - (Russia) Ilya Ovchinnikov - 86.64
  - (Japan) Yuya Tsuda - 86.09
  - (Russia) Vyacheslav Gryaznov - 84.73
  - (Taiwan) Yi-Chih Lu - 84.55
  - (Hong Kong) Ka-Ling Colleen Lee - 83.82
  - (Japan) Megumi Shimanuki - 79.90
  - (Germany) Esther Birringer - 79.64
  - (Taiwan) Brian Hsu - 79.09
  - (Japan) Yoshihiro Nagase - 78.18
  - (Japan) Ainobu Ota - 75.43
  - (Russia) Alexander Osminin - 73.30
  - (Georgia (country)) (Russia) Shorena Tsintsavadze - 00.00 (disqualified)

==== Finals ====
June 22–23

  - 1st Prize
  - (Japan) Yuya Tsuda - 8 votes
  - (Hong Kong) Ka-Ling Colleen Lee - 1 vote
  - (Russia) Ilya Ovchinnikov - 1 vote
  - (Russia) Oxana Shevchenko - 1 vote
  - 2nd Prize
  - (Taiwan) Yi-Chih Lu - 6 votes
  - (Russia) Oxana Shevchenko - 5 votes
  - 3rd Prize
  - (Russia) Oxana Shevchenko - 7 votes
  - (Hong Kong) Ka-Ling Colleen Lee - 2 votes
  - (Russia) Ilya Ovchinnikov - 2 votes
  - 4th Prize
  - (Russia) Ilya Ovchinnikov - 6 votes
  - (Hong Kong) Ka-Ling Colleen Lee - 5 votes
  - 5th Prize
  - (Hong Kong) Ka-Ling Colleen Lee - 8 votes
  - (Russia) Vyacheslav Gryaznov - 3 votes

== See also ==
- List of Sendai International Music Competition winners
