= Betsy Arakawa =

American musician and businesswoman (1959–2025)

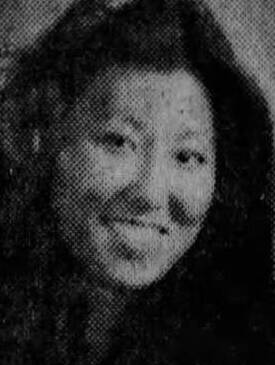
- Arakawa, c. 1981

Background information
- Born: Betsy Machiko Arakawa; December 15, 1959; Honolulu, Hawaii, U.S.
- Died: c. February 12, 2025 (aged 65) Santa Fe, New Mexico, U.S.
- Genres: Classical
- Instrument: Piano
- Spouse: Gene Hackman (m. 1991)

Betsy Machiko Arakawa Hackman (December 15, 1959 – c. February 12, 2025) was an American classical pianist and businesswoman. Born in Hawaii, she performed with the Honolulu Symphony Orchestra at the age of eleven and later worked for the television game show Card Sharks as a production assistant. She met Gene Hackman in the 1980s, marrying him in 1991 and assisting with his novels. In 2001, she co-founded a linens and home furnishings store in Santa Fe, New Mexico, where she and Hackman lived; the couple were also business partners in a local Asian restaurant.

Arakawa was found dead along with her husband, Gene Hackman, and one of their three dogs at their home in Santa Fe on February 26, 2025. This led to an investigation that showed that she died from hantavirus pulmonary syndrome around February 12, about a week before Hackman.

== Life and career ==
Betsy Machiko Arakawa was born on December 15, 1959, raised in Honolulu, Hawaii, and was of Japanese descent. An only child, she was raised by her mother, who was a businesswoman. She went to Kahala Elementary School and Punahou School. As a child, Arakawa studied piano with Ellen Masaki and performed at the Honolulu International Center Concert Hall at age eleven, where she performed the final movement of Haydn's Keyboard Concerto No. 4 with the Honolulu Symphony Orchestra. Arakawa studied social sciences and communication at the University of Southern California from 1981 to 1983. She later completed a master's degree in liberal arts at St. John's College in Santa Fe, New Mexico. During a summer break, Arakawa served as a cheerleader for the Los Angeles Aztecs, a professional soccer team, and worked for the television game show Card Sharks as a production assistant.

Arakawa met Hackman in the 1980s while working part-time at a Los Angeles fitness center when he had forgotten his membership card and she refused to let him in. In 1989, she performed at the Altenheim Geriatric Center in Forest Park, Illinois, which appeared as a nursing home in one of the films Hackman starred in, The Package. Arakawa and Hackman acquired a property on Old Sunset Trail, a residential area in the mountains of Santa Fe, New Mexico. There they worked with architects to convert a 1950s block building into a house that was "light and soaring", according to Nicole Briese in a People Magazine profile, drawing on a unique blend of local pueblo and colonial styles. Their home also had a separate studio building that had Arakawa's grand pianos on one side and Hackman's art studio on the other. The house was featured in Architectural Digest magazine in April 1990.

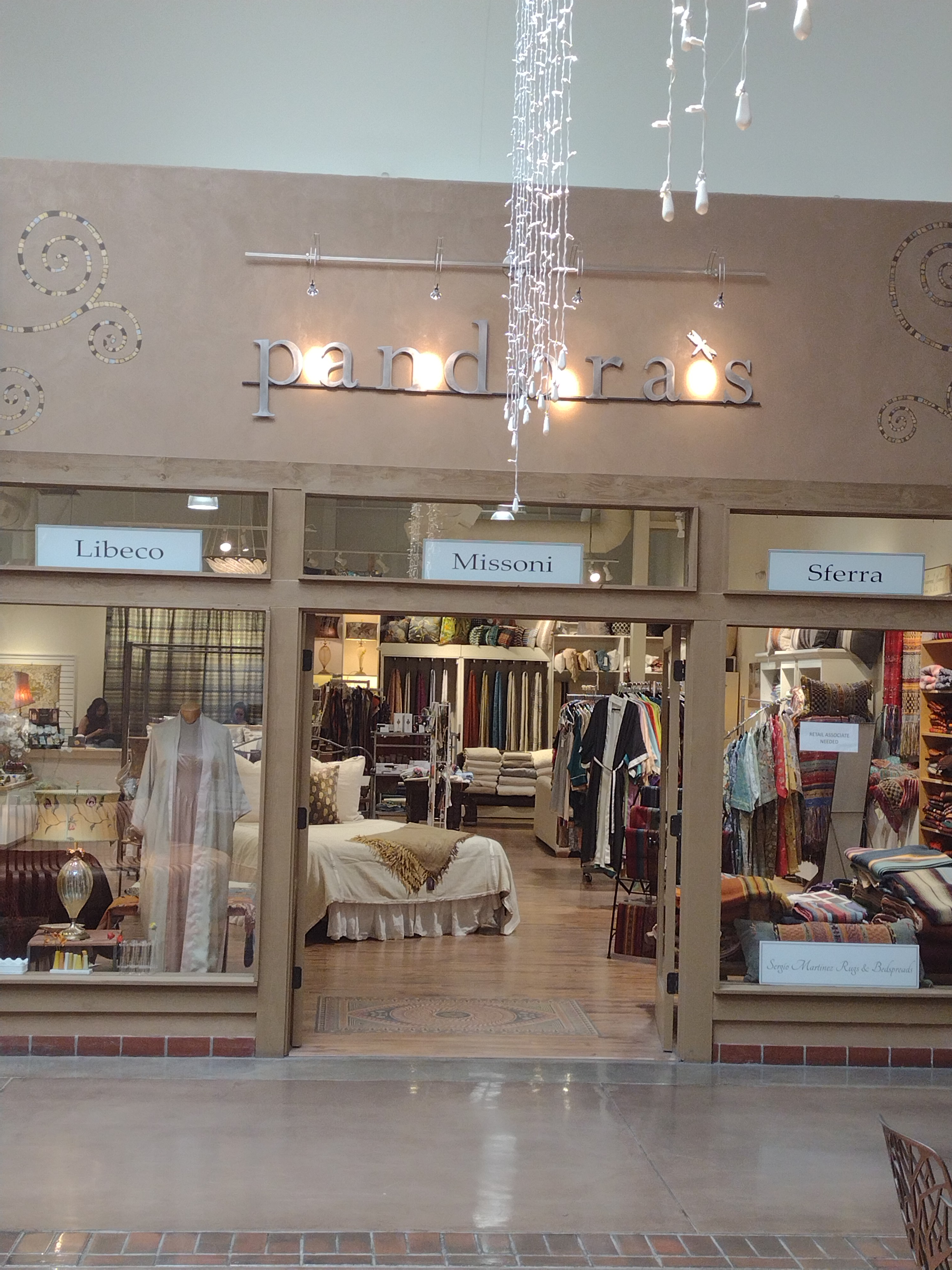
The entrance of Pandora's, Arakawa's linen store

After dating for seven years, the couple married on December 1, 1991, aged 31 and 61, after which Arakawa stopped performing in concert. In his later life, Hackman wrote and published three historical novels with anthropologist Daniel Lenihan; Arakawa assisted by typing Hackman's handwritten notes, editing, and providing feedback. In the acknowledgments of the 2004 novel, Justice for None, the co-authors thanked her for intervening when their disagreements became heated. In 2001, Arakawa and her close friend Barbara Lenihan co-founded a linens and home furnishings store in Santa Fe named Pandora's, which she ran until her death. Arakawa and Hackman were also business partners in a local Asian restaurant called Jinja, where she had helped with the menu.

In the later years of Hackman's life, Arakawa was his sole caregiver as his health worsened and he suffered from the effects of Alzheimer's disease. Their friend Tom Allin told The New York Times that she was "very protective" of her husband. Arakawa managed Hackman's social life, including games of golf and visits from friends, as he apparently did not use a mobile phone. Arakawa looked after his diet in light of his heart condition, including mixing soda water into his wine at a friend's 90th birthday party in 2020.

== Death ==
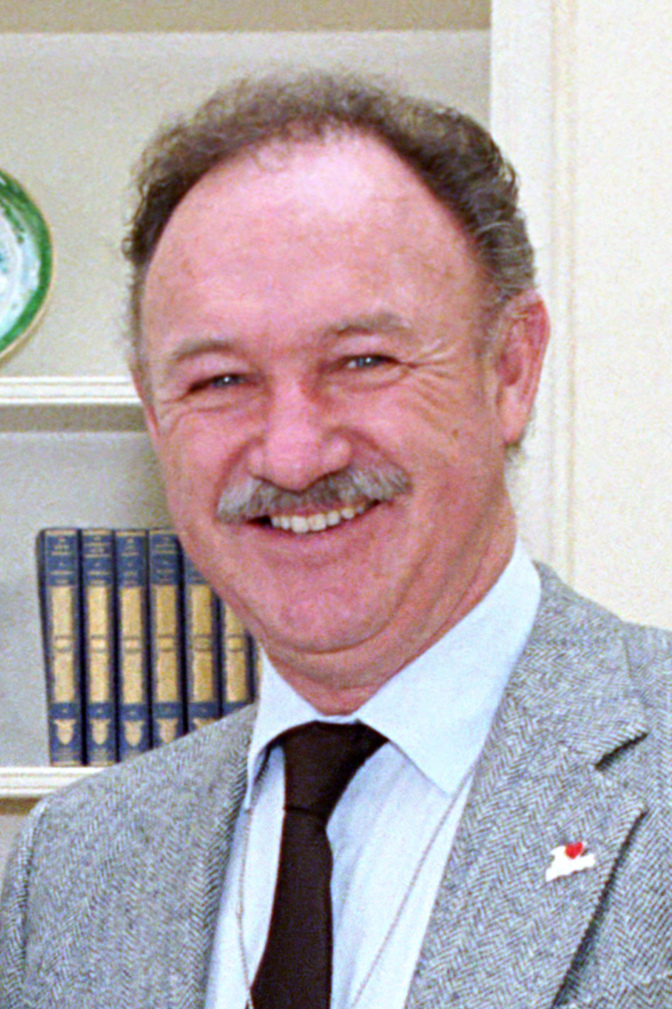
Arakawa married actor Gene Hackman in 1991.

Arakawa was last seen alive at a CVS Pharmacy on February 11, 2025, before she returned to her gated community at 5:15 pm. On February 12, 2025, Arakawa called a physician, who runs a private health clinic in Santa Fe, and made an appointment for that afternoon, but did not show up. Arakawa died in their home a short time later from hantavirus pulmonary syndrome, a rare disease passed from rodents. Two weeks later, maintenance workers found the Hackmans and one of their three dogs, named Zinna, dead in their home. In the ensuing investigation, their deaths were initially treated as suspicious. Arakawa's cause of death was announced at a press conference on March 7, 2025, by investigators, who also announced that she had died about a week before her husband, who died from heart disease. Investigators believe Hackman, who had advanced Alzheimer's disease, did not comprehend Arakawa's death and did not report it.

Yoshie Feaster, Arakawa's mother who was 91 years old at the time, stated that she experienced great emotional distress from the widespread media coverage and speculation surrounding her daughter's death. She requested in court that images and footage of the corpses of Arakawa, Hackman, and their dog be blocked from publication.
