= Hyun-soo =

- Hangul: 현수
- RR: Hyeonsu
- MR: Hyŏnsu

Hyun-soo, also spelled Hyun-su, is a Korean given name.

People with this name include:

Sportspeople

- Lee Hyun-soo (born 1968), South Korean fencer
- Kim Hyun-su (footballer, born February 1973) (born February 1973), South Korean football player
- Kim Hyun-soo (born March 1973), South Korean football player
- Viktor An (born Ahn Hyun-soo, 1985), South Korean-born Russian short track speed skater
- Kim Hyun-soo (baseball) (born 1988), South Korean baseball player
- Jang Hyun-soo (born 1991), South Korean football player
- Jang Hyun-soo (footballer, born 1993), South Korean football player
- Hwang Hyun-soo (born 1995), South Korean football player
- Tommy Edman (born Thomas Hyunsu Edman, 1995), American baseball player

Other

- Hyeon Soo Lim (born 1950s), South Korean-born Canadian Presbyterian pastor
- Lee Hyeon-su (writer) (born 1959), South Korean writer
- Yeo Hyun-soo (born 1982), South Korean actor
- Zia Hyunsu Shin (born 1987), South Korean violinist
- Shin Hyun-soo (born 1989), South Korean actor
- Kim Hyun-soo (actress) (born 2000), South Korean actress

Fictional characters with this name include:

- Hyeon-su, in 2006 South Korean film Cinderella
- Lee Hyun-soo, in 2012 South Korean television series Shut Up Flower Boy Band
- Park Hyun-soo, in 2013 South Korean television series Pots of Gold
- Cha Hyun-soo, in 2020 South Korean television series Sweet Home (TV series)
- Do Hyun-soo, in 2021 South Korea television series Flower of Evil

== See also ==
- List of Korean given names
