= Alexander Osminin =

Russian classical pianist (born 1981)

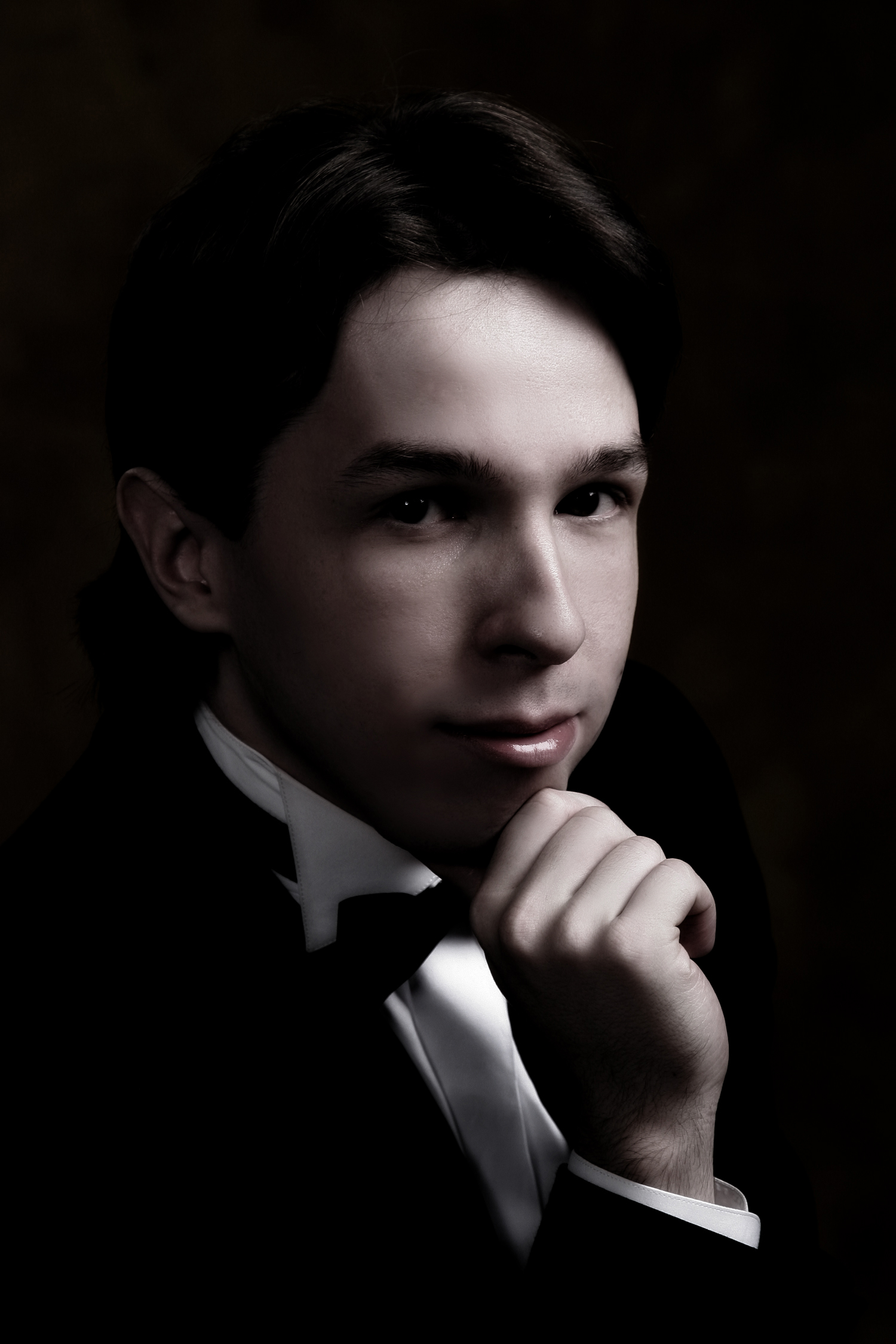

Background information
- Born: 19 November 1981 (age 44) (Russia) Moscow, USSR
- Genres: Classical
- Occupation: pianist
- Instrument: piano
- Website: Youtube channel

Alexander Petrovich Osminin (Russian: Александр Петрович Осминин; born November 19, 1981) is a Russian classical pianist who gives concerts throughout the world.

== Biography ==
Alexander Osminin was born in Moscow. He began studying music in 1988 and attended a music school, where his first teacher was I. V. Antypko. He completed his studies there in 1997.

From 1997 to 2000, Osminin studied at the Academic Music College. He later attended the Moscow Conservatory, studying under Eliso Virsaladze. He graduated in 2005 and continued his studies as a postgraduate student, completing the program in 2008.

== Repertoire ==
His repertoire ranges from the earliest keyboard masters to contemporary composers: from Domenico Scarlatti and J.S. Bach to Stravinsky and Hindemith.

Central to his repertoire are the works of Mozart, Beethoven, Chopin, Schubert, Schumann, Brahms, Liszt, Mussorgsky, Tchaikovsky, Prokofiev and Rachmaninoff.

== Recitals and activities ==
He gives concerts throughout the world: in 2009 a tour of nine Italy's cities, consisting of more than ten performances. Some of the places he also has performed are United States, Japan, France, Austria, Sweden, Norway, Germany, Switzerland, Portugal, Romania and many towns of Russia: Moscow, Saint-Petersburg, Krasnoyarsk, Perm, Tolyatti, Irkutsk, Arkhangelsk, Murmansk, just to name a few.

However, as Osminin once put it, "Out of all the foreign tours the most significant to me are my concerts at the Salle Cortot in Paris (2008, Recitals in Salle Cortot, Paris, France) and also a solo concert in one of the Gasteig Halls in Munich."

There have also been tours to the former countries of the Soviet Union – Ukraine, Georgia, Azerbaijan and Kazakhstan.

== Orchestras and chamber music ==
As a concerto soloist Osminin enjoys associations with many major orchestras. In 2005, 2006, 2007 he gave concerts in the Great Hall of the Moscow Conservatory with the New Russia Orchestra conducted by Yuri Bashmet.

Another important feature in his work is chamber music. Osminin often plays in different chamber ensembles, partnering with Natalia Gutman, Eliso Virsaladze, Alexander Buzlov, Andrey Baranov, Eugene Petrov, as well as many others.

He has been working with the viola player Fedor Belugin for many years. They have recorded a CD of compositions by Franck, Schumann and Brahms.

== Competitions ==
There are some of the international competitions that Alexander Osminin has won or been a prize-winner in:

- 2010, 1st prize, Sibiu, Romania. The Carl Filtsch Competition in Romania
- 2008, 1st prize, Katrineholm, Sweden. The 5th Swedish International Duo competition (together with F. Belugin)
- 2008, 1st prize, Pordenone, Italy. Luciano Gante International Piano Competitions
- 2008, 6th prize, Moscow, Russia. The Sviatoslav Richter International Piano Competition
- 2007, Audience Prize, Semi-finalist, Sendai City, Japan. 3rd Sendai International Piano Competition
- 2001, Semi-finalist, Tbilisi, Georgia. 2nd Tbilisi International Piano Competition, amongst others.

== Festivals ==
Besides competitions, Osminin has taken part in many international music festivals:

- Animato in Paris
- Julita Festival in Sweden
- Classical Music Festival in Porto (Portugal)
- S. Richter Music Festival in Tarusa, Kaluga region, Russia
- Dedication to Oleg Kagan Festival in Moscow
