= Chih-Yi Chen =

Taiwanese-American pianist

Chih-Yi Chen is a Taiwanese-American pianist, who as worked as a soloist, accompanist, music professor, and chamber musician.

== Education ==
Chen was born in Taiwan. She earned her bachelor's (1997), master's (1999), and doctorate (2013) in music from the Indiana University School of Music.

== Career ==
Her solo appearances take place throughout the United States, Europe, and Asia. Her collaborative experiences include performances with violinists Mark Kaplan, Ilya Kaler, Jaako Kuusisto, Robin Sharp, Barnabas Keleman, Richard Lin, violists Atar Arad, Yuval Gotlibovich, and cellist Csaba Onczay. She has also appeared under conductor Irwin Hoffman.

Her principal teachers include Lev Vlassenko and Luba Edlina-Dubinsky.

Chih-Yi Chen has taught at the Jacobs School of Music at Indiana University Bloomington since 2003. She has been part of the Chamber and Collaborative Music Department since its inception in 2016.
