= Sirena Huang =

American concert violinist (born 1994)

- Born: May 18, 1994 (age 32)
- Origin: United States
- Genre: Classical
- Occupation: Musician
- Instrument: Violin
- Years active: 2003–present

Sirena Huang (born May 18, 1994) is an American concert violinist. She has received numerous awards, including First Prize at the International Violin Competition of Indianapolis, First Prize at the Elmar Oliveira International Violin Competition, First Place at the International Tchaikovsky Competition for Young Musicians, and Third Place at the Singapore International Violin Competition and the Shanghai Isaac Stern International Violin Competition. She has performed with orchestras including the New York Philharmonic, Baltimore Symphony Orchestra, the Cleveland Orchestra, Singapore Symphony Orchestra, and the Shanghai Symphony Orchestra. Huang was appointed as the first Artist-in-Residence of the Hartford Symphony Orchestra in 2011.

== Biography ==
Huang started her violin lessons at the age of four with Linda Fiore at the Hartt School. Later, she also studied violin with Ian Pang at his home in Avon, Connecticut. She was also a scholarship student studying with Stephen Clapp and Sylvia Rosenberg at Juilliard School Pre-College division. In the summers of 2003 through 2007, Huang attended the Encore School for Strings and studied under David Cerone at the Cleveland Institute of Music. Huang went to The Loomis Chaffee School in Windsor, Connecticut for her high school education and was a member of the Class of 2012. She graduated from Juilliard School with a Bachelor of Music in 2016. There, she studied with Sylvia Rosenberg and Itzhak Perlman. She received her Artist Diploma at Yale University in 2019, where she studied with Hyo Kang.

Huang made her orchestra solo debut with the National Taiwan Symphony Orchestra at age nine. Three weeks later, she played with the Staatskapelle Weimar in Germany. Other orchestras with which she has played solo performances include New York Philharmonic, Cleveland Orchestra, Indianapolis Symphony Orchestra, Baltimore Symphony Orchestra, Shanghai Symphony Orchestra, Singapore Symphony Orchestra, Russian Symphony Orchestra, Hartford Symphony Orchestra, New Haven Symphony Orchestra, Lehigh Valley Chamber Orchestra, Greenwich Symphony Orchestra, Park Avenue Chamber Symphony Aspen Sinfonia, Long Island Philharmonic, Roanoke Orchestra, Bergen Philharmonic Orchestra in New Jersey, the Juilliard Pre-College Orchestra, Ensemble Blaeu Amsterdam, and Modus Chamber Ensemble in New York City.

She has performed at the Marlboro Music Festival, Ravinia’s Steans Music Institute, Aspen Music Festival, Newport Music Festival, and at the Eastern Music Festival. She has appeared regularly in the “Great Music for a Great City” series in New York City. Her concerts have been held at venues such as Berlin Philharmonie Hall, Carnegie Hall, Lincoln Center, Bushnell Center for the Performing Arts, Tilles Center, Kimmel Center, Severance Hall, Esplanade Concert Hall, National Concert Hall (Taiwan), among many others. In March 2005, she played her solo recital at Bushnell Center to benefit Fund for Access, a scholarship program for the Hartt School of Music. In 2006, she appeared on TED.

== Awards and recognition ==
Since 2003, Huang has been selected three times as one of ten "Exceptional Young Artists" worldwide at the “Starling-DeLay Symposium for Violin Study” at Juilliard School. Huang performed during the ceremony in which the annual Humanitarian Award was presented to President Sarkozy of France. Huang was also the highlight performer at the inaugural Wealth & Giving Forum gathering in October 2004 at the Greenbrier resort, an event attended by philanthropists Kenneth Behring and Vartan Gregorian, Elie Wiesel, and Fareed Zakaria. In June 2006, she performed before His Majesty King Abdullah II of Jordan and thirty other Nobel Prize Laureates—including Elie Wiesel—at the World Peace Conference held in Petra. In October 2007, under the invitation of former Czech Republic President Havel, she played in the Opening Ceremony of “Forum 2000 World Conference” in Prague.

In December 2003, she was First Prize winner in the junior division of the “Remember Enescu” International Violin Competition in Romania. At age 10, she was second place in the triennial International Louis Spohr Competition for Young Violinists held in Germany, and in addition was awarded the Special Prize of "Best Bach Interpretation". In the United States, she won The Juilliard School Pre-College Concerto Competition at age of nine as well as a Grand Prize of the New Haven Symphony Young Artist Competition in Connecticut. In September 2006, she received Third Prize in the Wieniawski International Competition for Young Violinists held in Lublin, Poland. In the summer of 2008, she won First Prize at the Aspen Music Festival Violin Competition.

In 2009, Huang was awarded the First Prize Gold Medal and title of Laureate of the International Tchaikovsky Competition for Young Musicians. In 2011 she received First Prize and the Audience Award at the 2011 Thomas & Evon Cooper International Competition. In the summer of 2011, she was also awarded the Bernard and Mania Hahnloser Prize for Violin at the Verbier Festival in Switzerland.

In 2015, she won third prize at the Singapore International Violin Competition. In 2016, she also won third prize at the Shanghai Isaac Stern International Violin Competition.

In February 2017, Sirena was awarded First Prize at the Inaugural Elmar Oliveira International Violin Competition. Subsequently, she won First Prize of the New York Concert Artist (NYCA) Worldwide Debut Audition in 2017 and received a Berlin Philharmonie Hall debut recital.

In 2022, Huang won the First Prize at the 11th International Violin Competition of Indianapolis. In addition to the gold medal, she was also awarded the special prizes for: the best performance of a Bach work, the best performance of a Mozart Sonata, the best performance of an encore work, the best performance of a Beethoven Sonata, the best performance of the newly commissioned work, the best performance of a sonata other than Beethoven, the best performance of a Kreisler work and the best performance of a major violin concerto.

== Praise ==
Huang has appeared and been interviewed in newspapers, on TV, and on radio programs including WQXR McGraw-Hill Young Artists Showcase, WNPR, Hartford Courant, Greenwich Time, Journal Inquirer, CNBC, WTNH, WTIC, WB20, and Beethoven Radio, and gave a performance on the “From the Top” radio program.

- The Hartford Courant reported, "Seldom have Hartford Symphony Orchestra concert-goers been so transfixed by a soloist as they were Thursday by 14-year-old Sirena Huang... Her musicality is solid, professional and mature. Huang played with effortless technical command and projected fresh ideas in concentrated but flowing gracefulness."
- The Baltimore Sun wrote: "Huang... [had] a remarkable amount of deeply expressive phrasing. Despite her youth, she sounded like someone who has lived quite a while with the score, long enough to feel confident putting her own stamp on it."
- In November 2007, the New York Times described her performance in a concert to honor Holocaust survivor Alice Herz-Sommer, as: "A Mendelssohn concerto exquisitely performed by a 13-year-old violinist, Sirena Huang, brought down the house."
- In February 2006, she was invited to be a guest speaker at the TED Conference, an annual gathering of over 1000 of the finest minds in technology, entertainment, and design of America. TED called Huang a player with "a musician’s soul that transcends her years."
