= Sean Kennard =

American classical pianist

- Born: October 3, 1984 (age 41); San Diego, California, U.S.
- Genres: Classical
- Occupation: Pianist
- Instrument: Piano
- Years active: fl. ca. 1995–present
- Website: www.seankennard.com

Sean Eric Kennard (born October 3, 1984) is an American classical pianist.

== Early years ==
Sean Kennard was born in San Diego, California to a Japanese mother and American father. He grew up in Hawaii and his family moved to Philadelphia when he began studying at the Curtis Institute of Music, at age 13.

Kennard began lessons at the Ellen Masaki School of Music on his tenth birthday, October 3, 1994 in Honolulu, Hawaii and began studies with Ellen Masaki on January 5, 1995. In the summer of that year he gave his first public solo performance in Honolulu. He performed in Carnegie Hall on May 18, 1996 as part of the Hawaii Music Awards, and travelled back to Honolulu the next day to place first in the final round of the International Chopin Competition of the Pacific. He performed recitals in Poland in 1997 at the Fryderyk Chopin Society of Warsaw and Żelazowa Wola (Chopin's birthplace). On October 3, 1997, the third anniversary of beginning piano studies, he performed a recital of Chopin's Études Op. 10 and 25 at the Academy of Arts in Honolulu.

== Education ==
Kennard received his bachelor of music degree from the Curtis Institute of Music in 2004. He began studies at Curtis with Eleanor Sokoloff in 1998, and was the first student from the state of Hawaii ever to be accepted to the institution. In his final year, he was awarded the piano department's Sergei Rachmaninoff Award, given to one graduating pianist each year. During his time at Curtis, he won 2nd prize at the Hilton Head International Piano Competition. Immediately after graduating, he competed in the Sendai International Music Competition and was the first American and contestant outside of Asia and Europe to win a prize in the competition. He went on from Curtis to study with Enrique Graf at the College of Charleston in their Artist Certificate program in Fall of 2004. In 2012 he graduated with a Master of Music from the Juilliard School, studying with Jerome Lowenthal and Robert McDonald, before entering the Professional Studies Diploma program at Mannes College later that year to study with Richard Goode. He was accepted into the Doctor of Musical Arts program at the Yale School of Music in the studio of Boris Berman in 2014, and completed the residential portion of the degree in the Spring of 2016.

== Concert appearances ==
After beginning studies with Graf, Kennard won various other prizes in piano competitions, including the National Chopin Competition, Iowa Piano Competition, and Dr. Luis Sigall Music Competition. He was one of four finalists from the 2005 National Chopin Competition featured in the documentary "Pianists," relating the story of the American pianists as they travelled to Poland to participate in the 2005 International Frederick Chopin Piano Competition. In 2009 he was one of two pianists named "Vendome Virtuosi" at the Vendome Prize in Lisbon. He was a Laureate of the 2013 Queen Elisabeth Competition in Brussels where he performed in the final round with the National Orchestra of Belgium conducted by Marin Alsop. When he was accepted into Yale's Doctor of Musical Arts program In 2014, he was the sole musician chosen to receive the Mustard Seed Foundation's Harvey Fellowship Award, a cash stipend given to exceptional Christian students in top tier graduate programs around the world.

Kennard has appeared as soloist with various orchestras around the world, including the Prague Radio Symphony Orchestra, Orchestre National de Belgique, Orchestre Royal de Chambre de Wallonie (Belgium), Orchestre Philharmonique du Maroc (Morocco), Yomiuri Nippon Symphony Orchestra (Japan), Sendai Philharmonic Orchestra (Japan), Osaka Symphony Orchestra (Japan), NHK Chamber Orchestra (Japan), Kyushu Symphony Orchestra (Japan), Yamagata Symphony Orchestra (Japan), Orchestra Sinfónica Nacional (Dominican Republic), Deutsches Kammerorchester (Frankfurt), Orquesta Sinfónica de Chile, Orquesta Filarmónica de Montevideo, Orquesta Filarmónica Regional (Chile), Sinfonia Perugina (Italy), Orquesta Sinfónica de la Universidad de Concepción (Chile), Orquesta Sinfónica de la Universidad de Concepción (Chile), Indianapolis Chamber Orchestra, Honolulu Symphony Orchestra, Sioux City Symphony Orchestra, Charleston Symphony Orchestra, Hilton Head Orchestra, New Amsterdam Symphony Orchestra, and Florida International University Orchestra.

He has appeared in recital and chamber music in such venues as Teatro Caio Melisso (Spoleto, Italy), Teatro Municipal (Vina del Mar, Chile), Yomiuri Otemachi Hall (Tokyo, Japan), Kennedy Center Terrace Theater (Washington D.C.), Seoul Arts Center (Seoul, Korea), Hong Kong City Hall (Hong Kong), Salle Cortot (Paris, France), Theatre Royal de la Monnaie (Brussels, Belgium), Palacio Nacional de Queluz (Lisbon, Portugal), Tokyo Opera City Recital Hall (Tokyo, Japan), Chopin Society (Warsaw, Poland), Alice Tully Hall (New York City, USA), International Piano Series (Charleston, SC), Katsushika Symphony Hills (Tokyo, Japan), Hilbert Circle Theatre (Indianapolis, IN), Gulbenkian Foundation (Lisbon, Portugal), Orvis Auditorium (Honolulu, HI), California MTA Convention (San Jose, CA), Minami-Azabu Centre Hall (Tokyo, Japan), Togouchi Fureai Center (Akiota, Japan), Kresge Recital Hall (Pittsburgh, PA), Rantokaku Art Museum (Kure, Japan), Cine Teatro Municipal (Treinta y Tres, Uruguay), Steinway Hall (New York City, USA), Munetsugu Hall (Nagoya, Japan), Palais des Beaux-Arts (Brussels, Belgium), Hawaii Theater (Honolulu, HI), Oto no Izumi Hall (Oita, Japan), Flagey Studio 4 (Brussels, Belgium), Yamaha Hall (Tokyo, Japan), Teatro del Lago (Frutillar, Chile), Civic Cultural Hall (Morioka, Japan), Alumni Concert Hall (Pittsburgh, PA), Gallery Core Hall (Takasaki, Japan), Academy of the Arts (Honolulu, HI), Mar-a-Lago (Palm Beach, FL), Perlman Music Program (Shelter Island, NY), Christ Church Cathedral (Indianapolis, IN), Takarayama Hall (Kagoshima, Japan), Teatro Larranaga (Paysandu, Uruguay), Tobata Civic Center (Kitakyushu, Japan), Sala dei Notari (Perugia, Italy), Sogo Hall (Saijo, Japan), Hotel del Lago (Punta del Este, Uruguay)( He is currently represented in Japan by Nippon Artists Management Inc.

== Teaching Positions ==
Beginning in the fall of 2017, Kennard holds the position of Associate Professor of Piano at Stetson University's School of Music.

== Recognition ==
Patrick Rucker of The Washington Post said of his performance of Beethoven's Sonata Op. 57 "Appassionata" that he played with "powerful and involved musicmaking" Ruth Bingham of the Honolulu Advertiser said of his last-minute substitution for Van Cliburn Competition silver medalist Joyce Yang, playing the Grieg concerto with the Honolulu Symphony, that he displayed "a special affinity for quietly lyrical passages"

== Awards ==
- 2003, Hilton Head International Piano Competition (USA), 2nd prize
- 2004, Sendai International Music Competition (Japan), 5th prize
- 2004, Curtis Institute of Music Sergei Rachmaninoff Award
- 2005, National Chopin Competition (USA), 3rd prize
- 2006, Iowa Piano Competition (USA), 2nd prize
- 2007, Dr. Luis Sigall International Music Competition, Vina del Mar (Chile), 1st prize and Best Performance of the Obligatory Work (member of World Federation of International Music Competitions)
- 2009, Vendome Prize (Portugal), Vendome Virtuoso Award
- 2013, Queen Elisabeth Competition (Belgium), Laureate
- 2014, Mustard Seed Foundation, Harvey Fellowship Award

== See also ==
- Sendai International Music Competition
- Curtis Institute of Music
- College of Charleston
