= Igor Ozim =

Slovenian classical violinist (1931–2024)

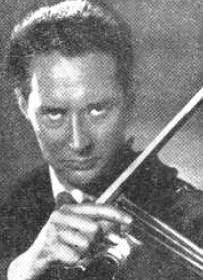
- Born: 9 May 1931; Ljubljana, Kingdom of Yugoslavia
- Died: 23 March 2024 (aged 92); Salzburg, Austria
- Occupation: Violinist

Igor Ozim (9 May 1931 – 23 March 2024) was a Slovenian classical violinist and pedagogue. He was based in Salzburg, Austria.

== Life and career ==
Igor Ozim was born in 1931 in Ljubljana. He came from a musical family: both parents played the piano and his brother the violin. At age 5, he started private lessons with Leon Pfeifer, a former student of Otakar Ševčík, at the Academy of Music, Ljubljana. He entered Pfeifer's class at the Academy when he was 8.

In 1949 he was awarded a British Council scholarship to study in the United Kingdom. He spent three months at the Royal College of Music learning the Elgar Violin Concerto in B minor under one of its greatest exponents, Albert Sammons, followed by two years study with Max Rostal.

In 1951 Ozim won the International Carl Flesch Violin Competition, making his Wigmore Hall debut recital shortly afterwards. His concerto debut was the Mendelssohn Violin Concerto in E minor, with the Liverpool Philharmonic Orchestra under Hugo Rignold.

In 1953 he won the ARD International Music Competition in Munich.

Ozim returned to his home country to play many concerts. He also toured widely through Europe, the Soviet Union, the United States, Australia, New Zealand and the Far East.

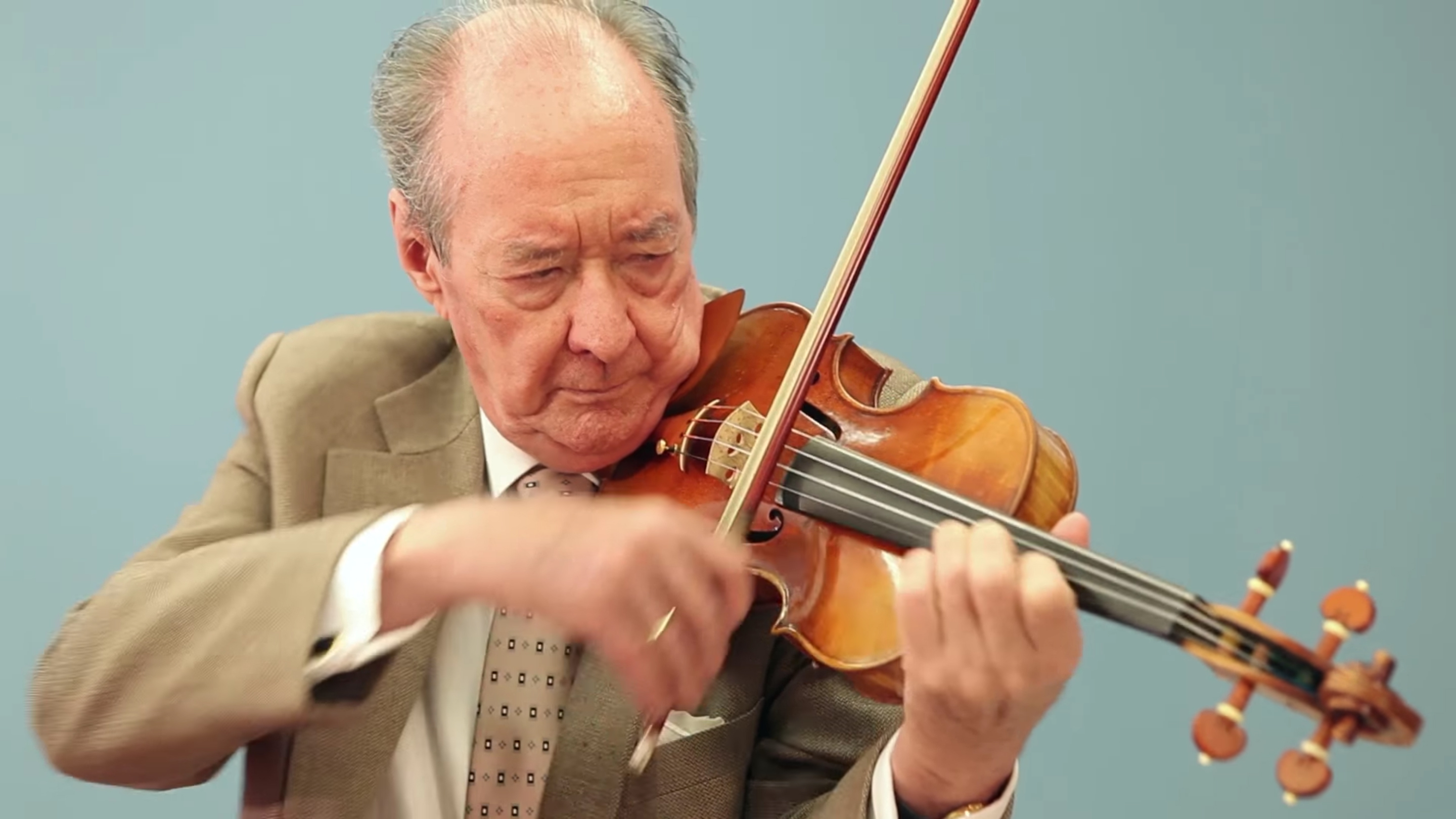
Ozim performing for G. Henle Verlag in 2013

He had a repertoire of around 60 violin concertos and many chamber music works. He gave many first performances and was the dedicatee of many works. The Berlin Philharmonic, the London Philharmonic Orchestra, the London Symphony Orchestra, the BBC Symphony Orchestra and the Warsaw Philharmonic Orchestra are some of the many orchestras he played with.

Ozim gave master classes in many countries, and was later based at the Mozarteum in Salzburg, Austria. He taught at the Musikhochschule in Cologne, Germany and the Hochschule der Künste in Bern, Switzerland. His students included Božena Angelova, Rachel Kolly d'Alba, Lea Birringer, Kurt Sassmannshaus, Peter Tanfield, Olivier Thouin, Patricia Kopatchinskaja, Richard Tognetti and Gwendolyn Masin, as well as current and past leaders of the Berlin Philharmonic, Bavarian Radio Symphony, Zürich Tonhalle Orchestra, Dresden Staatskapelle, Orchestra of the Royal Opera House and many others.

Ozim made a number of recordings, including contributing to integral recordings of the piano trios of Mozart and the chamber music of Schubert. He also recorded violin concertos by his countrymen Slavko Osterc, Lucijan Marija Škerjanc, Ivo Petrić, Janez Matičič and Uroš Krek.

Ozim appeared as jury member at noted violin competitions. These included the Isang Yun Competition 2004 and the International Violin Competition Henri Marteau 2008, 2011 and 2014.

Ozim produced editions of various works from the classical and contemporary violin repertoire, including the Mozart violin concertos.

Ozim died in Salzburg, Austria on 23 March 2024, at the age of 92.
