= Božena Angelova =

Slovenian violinist

Božena Angelova is a Slovenian violinist. She has recorded for the Slovenian Broadcasting Company and has performed as a soloist with the Slovenian Philharmonic Orchestra and the Carinthian symphony orchestra, amongst others.

== Biography ==
She began playing the violin aged seven, initially taught by her father. After finishing the local music school, she moved to Austria in order to study with Helfried Fister at the Conservatory of Music in Klagenfurt where she obtained her music degree with distinction. She continued her musical studies at the College of Music and Arts in Bern, Switzerland and at the University of Music Mozarteum in Salzburg with Igor Ozim, where she finished her masterstudies with distinction. To complement her university education, she attended many courses by renowned musicians, including Thomas Brandis, Tibor Varga, Evgenia Tchugaeva, Mintcho Mintchev, Rainer Schmidt, Siegmund Nissel, Emerson String Quartet, and Bruno Canino.

She won a prize at the international Johannes Brahms competition in Austria.
