= Shannon Lee (violinist) =

- Born: 1992 (age 32–33); Canada
- Genres: Classical
- Instrument: Violin

Shannon Lee (born 1992) is a Canadian-American violinist. She won fourth prize at the 2019 Queen Elisabeth Competition in Brussels, Belgium, top prize at the Sendai International Music Competition in Sendai, Japan, and second prize at the International Naumburg Competition.

== Biography ==
Born in Canada to engineer parents, Lee started the violin at the age of 4 in Plano, Texas. At age 8, she started studying with Jan Mark Sloman. Lee debuted at the age of 12 with the Dallas Symphony Orchestra, and two years later performed with Christof Perick and the Nuremberg Philharmonic. In 2013, she earned a bachelor's degree in computer science at Columbia University, where she also studied with David Nadien, former concertmaster of the New York Philharmonic. In 2016 Lee earned a Performance Diploma at the Curtis Institute of Music, where she studied with Ida Kavafian and Arnold Steinhardt. During her time in Philadelphia, she worked under the mentorship of Mary Javian as a Curtis ArtistYear Fellow, helping to support music programs for Cramp Elementary and high school students with help from the All City Orchestra chamber music programs. Lee is a founding member of the Bicycle String Trio. In 2018, she entered the Cleveland Institute of Music for a Master of Music degree, studying with Jan Sloman and Jaime Laredo.

Lee has performed with the Nashville Symphony, Las Vegas Philharmonic, Fresno Philharmonic, Belgian National Orchestra, Sendai Philharmonic Orchestra, Indianapolis Symphony Orchestra, Nuremberg Philharmonic, Dallas Symphony Orchestra, Colorado Music Festival Orchestra, Charlotte Symphony, Lewisville Lake Symphony, Arkansas Symphony, West Virginia Symphony, and Phoenix Symphony.

== Awards and appearances ==
- 2018: First prize winner, Artists Series Concerts of Sarasota National Competition for Strings
- 2018: Laureate, Best Performance of an Ysaÿe Sonata, International Violin Competition of Indianapolis at Indianapolis, Indiana
- 2018: Sixth prize winner, International Violin Competition of Indianapolis
- 2018: Second prize winner, International Naumburg Competition at New York City, New York
- 2019: Fourth prize winner, Queen Elisabeth Competition at Brussels, Belgium
- 2019: Laureate, Audience award, Sendai International Music Competition at Sendai, Japan
- 2019: Second prize winner (no first prize awarded), violin category, Sendai International Music Competition
- 2021: Finalist (one of six), 2020 Shanghai Isaac Stern International Violin Competition. Contestants were not ranked.

== Discography ==
- Introducing Shannon Lee. Music of Wieniawski, Kreisler, Debussy, Elgar, Scriabin, Brahms, Vitali, Engel, Chopin, Rimsky-Korsakov, Ernst, and Bazzini. With Pamela Mia Paul, piano. Telarc CD80695. (2008)
- Shannon Lee. The 7th Sendai International Music Competition. Bartók: Violin Concerto No. 2; Mozart: Violin Concerto No. 4 in D major, K. 218. With the Sendai Philharmonic Orchestra. Fontek FOCD9824. (2019)
