= Robert Chen =

Taiwanese violinist (born 1969)

- 陳慕融
- Born: 1969 (age 56–57); Taipei, Taiwan
- Occupation: Violinist
- Organization: Chicago Symphony Orchestra

Robert Chen (Chinese: 陳慕融; pinyin: Chén Mùróng) is a Taiwan-born violinist who is the Concertmaster of the Chicago Symphony Orchestra. He received Bachelor's and Master's of Music degrees from the Juilliard School, where he studied with Dorothy DeLay and Masao Kawasaki.

== Career ==
Born in Taipei, Taiwan in 1969, Chen began studying the violin at the early age of seven. He immigrated with his family three years later to Los Angeles where he studied with Robert Lipsett at the Colburn School. Chen advanced very quickly, debuting with the Los Angeles Philharmonic at the age of twelve and participating in the master classes by legendary violinist Jascha Heifetz. Today he is an active musician, working with a number of ensembles and other projects. He has a personally-edited version of the violin part for Johannes Brahms first symphony, available through the online publisher Ovation Press.

His activities as a soloist include performances with the Los Angeles Philharmonic, Swedish Radio Orchestra, Asia Philharmonic Orchestra, Moscow Philharmonic, New Japan Philharmonic, National Symphony Orchestra of Taiwan, Orchestra of the Komische Oper Berlin, NDR Orchestra of Hannover, and Bournemouth Symphony. In 2000 he made his Chicago Symphony Orchestra concerto debut with Maestro Daniel Barenboim. In 2003 he gave the Chicago Symphony orchestra premiere of the Elliott Carter Violin Concerto. Chen is a frequent guest at major music festivals including the Marlboro Music Festival, Aspen Music Festival, La Jolla Summerfest, and the Schloss-Moritzburg Festival in Dresden, where he has collaborated with Emanuel Ax and Richard Goode. He also has toured extensively with Musicians from Marlboro. As a chamber musician, Chen has collaborated with Daniel Barenboim, Itzhak Perlman, Pinchas Zukerman, and Yo Yo Ma, both at Orchestra Hall in Chicago and at Carnegie Hall in New York.

Chen won top prize at the 1994 International Joseph Joachim Violin Competition in Hanover, Germany and awards at the Taipei International Violin Competition (1988), National Young Musicians Foundation Debut Competition (1984), and Aspen Music Festival Concerto Competition (1986). He has recorded works by Tchaikovsky, including the famous violin concerto, with the Berlin Classics label. Chen received an award at the Coleman Chamber Ensemble Competition in 1985 and is a founding member of the Johannes Quartet.

== Personal life ==
Robert Chen lives with his wife, violinist Laura Park Chen, and is the father of two children, Beatrice Chen and Noah Chen. In 2020, the four of them formed the Chen String Quartet to continue making music during the COVID-19 pandemic.
