= Clara-Jumi Kang =

Korean and German violinist (born 1987)

- 클라라 주미 강
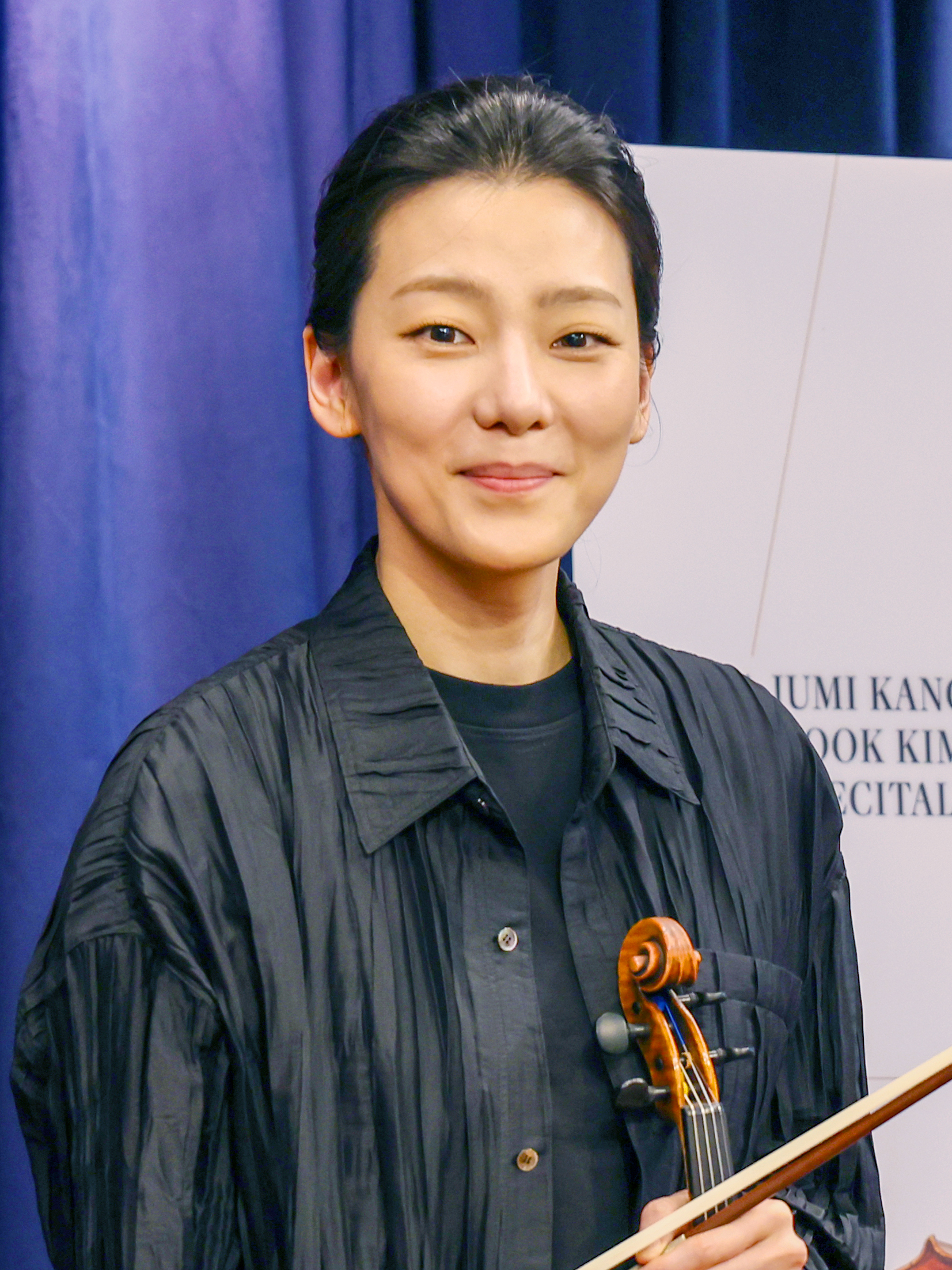
- Kang in 2026
- Born: 10 June 1987 (age 39); Mannheim, Germany
- Occupation: Classical violinist
- Website: clarajumikang.com

Clara-Jumi Kang (Korean: 클라라 주미 강; born 10 June 1987) is a South Korean and German classical violinist. She won the Indianapolis International Violin Competition in 2010 with five additional prizes. South Korean newspaper The Dong-A Ilbo listed her among South Korea's one hundred "most inspiring and influential people" in 2012.--> She was named the Kumho Musician of the Year in 2013.

== Early life and education ==
Kang's parents are both Korean opera singers: her father is bass Philip Kang, and her mother is soprano Han Min-hee. Kang started playing the violin aged three. A year later she became the youngest student ever to enter the Mannheim Musikhochschule, where she studied under Valery Gradov, who had also taught Frank Peter Zimmermann. When Kang was five she moved to Lübeck to study under Professor Zakhar Bron, and performed her first public concerto. German magazine Die Zeit featured six-year-old Kang on its cover, depicting her as a 'Wunderkind'. Aged seven she won a full scholarship to Juilliard, after the school's violin instructor Dorothy DeLay heard Kang's playing. Kang suffered a serious injury to her hand aged 11 and was not able to play for many years. By 16 Kang had taken her Bachelor and Master's degrees at the Korean National University of Arts under Nam-Yun Kim. While a student in Korea she placed highly in several international violin competitions. She later studied at the Munich Musikhochschule with Christoph Poppen from 2011 to 2013.

== Performing and recording career ==
Clara-Jumi Kang debuted with the Hamburg Symphony Orchestra aged five. She has placed highly or won many international violin competitions, including the prestigious International Violin Competition of Indianapolis in 2010.

Kang has performed with orchestras worldwide, including the Cologne Chamber Orchestra, Kremerata Baltica, Rotterdam Philharmonic Orchestra, Orchestre National de Belgique, The Orchestre de la Suisse Romande, New Jersey Symphony Orchestra, Indianapolis Symphony Orchestra, Santa Fe Symphony Orchestra, Mariinsky Theatre Orchestra, NHK Symphony Orchestra, Tokyo Metropolitan Symphony Orchestra, New Japan Philharmonic, Hong Kong Sinfonietta, NCPA Orchestra, Beijing, Macao Orchestra, Taipei Symphony Orchestra, Hamburg Symphony, Kiel Philharmonie, Nice Philharmonie, Atlanta Symphony Orchestra, Seoul Philharmonic Orchestra, KBS Symphony Orchestra, and the Korean Chamber Ensemble. She has worked with conductors including Valery Gergiev, Lionel Bringuier, Vladimir Fedoseyev, Andrey Boreyko, Christoph Poppen, Vladimir Spivakov, Yuri Temirkanov, Gidon Kremer, Gilbert Varga, Lü Jia, Myung-whun Chung, Heinz Holliger and Kazuki Yamada.

Kang recorded Beethoven's Triple Concerto in C Major, Op. 56 for Teldec when she was nine. She released her first solo album, Modern Solo, for Decca Records in 2011. In 2016 for her second album, Schumann Brahms Sonatas · Romances, she partnered with the pianist, Yeol Eum Son. Her recording of Beethoven's violin sonatas recording with the pianist Sunwook Kim for Accentus in 2020 was met with a positive critical reception.

== Awards ==
- 2007: Third Prize, International Tibor Varga Violin Competition
- 2009: First Prize, Seoul International Music Competition
- 2009: Second Prize, International Joseph Joachim Violin Competition, Hanover, Germany
- 2010: First Prize (and five special prizes), International Violin Competition of Indianapolis
- 2010: First Prize, Sendai International Music Competition
- 2012: Daewon Music Award
- 2014: Kumho Musician of the Year
- 2015: Fourth Prize, International Tchaikovsky Competition

== Discography ==
- 2011: "Modern Solo" (Decca Classics)
- 2016: "Schumann Brahms Sonatas · Romances" (Decca Classics).
- 2021: Beethoven Violin sonatas Clara-Jumi Kang, Sunwook Kim /Accentus Music
