= Zia Hyunsu Shin =

South Korean violinist (born 1987)

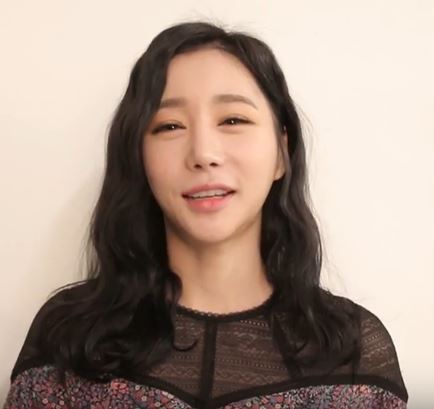
- Born: Shin Hyun-Soo; July 16, 1987 (age 39); Jeonju, South Korea
- Education: Korea National University of Arts
- Occupation: Violinist

Korean name
- Hangul: 신현수
- Hanja: 申鉉洙
- RR: Sin Hyeonsu
- MR: Sin Hyŏnsu
- Website: zia-hyunsu-shin.com

Zia Hyunsu Shin (born July 16, 1987) is a South Korean violinist.

Shin was born in Jeonju, and studies at the Korea National University of Arts. She plays a Guadagnini, which is on loan from the Kumho Asiana Foundation. She won the first great prize of Marguerite Long-Jacques Thibaud International Violin Competition in 2008. She made her professional debut in 2009, playing Mendelssohn Violin Concerto at the National Symphony Orchestra of Washington D.C under Ivan Fischer. She won the third prize in the finale of the 2012 Queen Elisabeth Music Competition. She was previously known just as Hyun-Soo Shin (her birth name, with the given name written first as in European practice), but in 2013 she added the name Zia because she found that people in other countries often mispronounced the name Hyun-Soo, or assumed she was a man because they did not know whether the name was masculine or feminine.

== Awards ==
- Second Prize, 2006 International Joseph Joachim Violin Competition, Hanover, Germany
