= Singapore International Violin Competition =

SIVC logo

The Singapore International Violin Competition (SIVC) is a triennial violin competition for violinists up to the age of 30. The contest is hosted by the Yong Siew Toh Conservatory of Music and has been held in Singapore since 2015. The competition promotes the continued growth and strength of classical music in the region, and showcases young violinists from around the world.

== Venues ==
- Esplanade – Theatres on the Bay
- Victoria Theatre and Concert Hall
- Yong Siew Toh Conservatory of Music Concert Hall

== Prizes ==
Prize	Amount
First prize	US$50,000
Second prize	US$25,000
Third prize	US$15,000
Fourth prize	US$6,000
Fifth prize	US$5,000
Sixth prize	US$4,000

=== Special Prizes ===
Prize	Amount
Goh Soon Tioe Violin and Piano Recital Prize	US$5,000
Audience Prize (by voting)	US$2,000
Kris Foundation Best Performer of Commissioned Work Prize	US$1,000
Best Performance of Bach	US$1,000
Best Performance of Ysaÿe	US$1,000

- Top 6 winners are eligible for a 3-year fine violin loan from the Rin Collection.

== Results ==
Year	1st Prize	2nd Prize	3rd Prize	4th Prize	5th Prize	6th Prize
2015	(Taiwan) Yu-Chien Tseng	(Taiwan) Richard Lin	(United States) Sirena Huang	(Moldova) Alexandra Conunova	(South Korea) Lim Hyun Jae	(France) Fedor Rudin
2018	(Russia) Sergei Dogadin	(Japan) Chisa Kitagawa	(Ukraine) Oleksandr Korniev	(United States) Laurel Gagnon	(Japan) Lisa Yasuda	(China) Xiaoxuan Shi
2022^{a}	(Ukraine) Dmytro Udovychenko	(Denmark) Anna Agafia Egholm	(Hong Kong) Angela Sin Ying Chan	(United States) Nathan Meltzer	(China) Tianyou Ma	(China) Yiying Jiang
2026	(Ukraine) Georgii Moroz	(Denmark) Michael Germer	(China) Zou Meng	(United States) Karisa Chiu	(South Korea) SongHa Choi	(China) Qingzhu Weng

^{a} The 2021 competition was postponed to December 2022 due to the COVID-19 pandemic.

== See also ==
- List of classical music competitions
