= Elmar Oliveira International Violin Competition =

The Elmar Oliveira International Violin Competition is a music competition for violinists aged 18-30. It is held every three years at Lynn University in Boca Raton, Florida. It was established in 2016 by the violinist Elmar Oliveira in collaboration with Lynn University with the goal of helping young violinists launch their performance careers.

== Winners ==
Year	Winner	Second Prize	Third Prize	Fourth Prize
2017	Sirena Huang	Alina Ming Kobialka	Hannah Tarley	
2020	Julian Rhee	Jung Min Choi	Igor Khukhua	
2023	Hina Khuong-Huu	Gabrielle Després	Laurel Gagnon	
2026	Hyun Jae Lim	Yiyang Hou	Sameer Agrawal	Julia Jones
