= Elmar Oliveira =

American violinist

Elmar Oliveira (born June 28, 1950) is an American violinist.

== Early life ==
The son of Portuguese immigrants, Elmar Oliveira was born in Naugatuck, Connecticut. Oliveira was nine when he began studying the violin with his brother John. At age 16 he appeared in a nationally-televised concert from Lincoln Center of child prodigy performers hosted by Leonard Bernstein, as part of Bernstein's Young People's Concerts series. He later studied with Ariana Bronne and Raphael Bronstein at the Hartt College of Music and the Manhattan School of Music. In 1978 he and Ilya Grubert tied for first prize at the Tchaikowsky Competition in Moscow.

== Career ==
He was a Grammy nominee for his 1990 CD of the Barber Concerto with Leonard Slatkin and the Saint Louis Symphony. His recorded works for Artek, Angel, Sony Masterworks, Vox, Delos, IMP, Naxos, Ondine, Élan, and Melodiya range widely from works by Bach and Vivaldi to contemporary composers. His best-selling 1997 recording of the Rautavaara Violin Concerto with the Helsinki Philharmonic (Ondine) won a Cannes Classical Award and has appeared on Gramophone’s "Editor’s Choice" and other best recordings lists around the world.

In 1981, he was a soloist with the Naumburg Orchestral Concerts, in the Naumburg Bandshell, Central Park, in the summer series.

Oliveira is a Distinguished Artist in Residence at the Lynn University Conservatory of Music in Boca Raton, Florida. In 2016, Oliveira established the Elmar Oliveira International Violin Competition in collaboration with Lynn University.

== Violins ==
Elmar Oliveira performs on an instrument known as the "Stretton", made ca. 1729-30 by Giuseppe Guarneri del Gesu, and on several other violins by outstanding contemporary makers, including Joseph Curtin, Michael Koeberling and John Young. Before purchasing the Stretton in 1994, Oliveira owned and performed with the 1697 Molitor Stradivarius, which he purchased in 1989.

== Awards and honors ==
Oliveira has received honorary doctorates from Manhattan School of Music and Binghamton University. He received the Order of Santiago, Portugal’s highest civilian honor. He has served on the juries of some of the most prestigious violin competitions, including the Montreal, Indianapolis, Naumburg, and Vianna da Motta.

He remains the only American violinist to win the Gold Medal at Moscow’s Tchaikovsky International Competition, which he did in 1978. He is also the first violinist to receive the coveted Avery Fisher Prize in 1983, in addition to capturing First Prizes at the Naumburg International Competition and the G.B. Dealey Competition.
