= Aeolian Chamber Players =

The Aeolian Chamber Players is an American musical ensemble that is dedicated to the performance of chamber music. Founded in 1961 by violinist Lewis Kaplan, the group has been the resident ensemble at Bowdoin College in Brunswick, Maine since 1964. The ensemble is particularly known for performing new works and has produced several commercial recordings. The ensemble's recording of George Crumb's Night of the Four Moons for Columbia Records was nominated for a Grammy Award for Best Classical Album. Approximately 150 works, many by noted composers, were written for the Aeolians including Luciano Berio"O King", George Crumb "Eleven Echoes of Autumn, 1965" and "Dream Sequence", Ralph Shapey "Discourse for Four Instruments" and "Discourse 2", Mario Davidovsky "Junctures", Milton Babbitt "Four Play". Several notable musicians have been members of the ensemble during its history, including pianists Walter Ponce and Gilbert Kalish, flutists Erich Graf and Thomas Nyfenger, cellists Jerry Grossman and Ronald Thomas, and clarinetist Thomas Hill, among others. The ensemble held extended residencies at Sarah Lawrence College and C.W.Post College. The Aeolians recorded for BBC and Swiss Radio and by invitation participated in the NEA's pilot project in chamber music.

== Sources ==
- New York Times, November 16, 1988
