= Bomsori Kim =

South Korean violinist (born 1989)

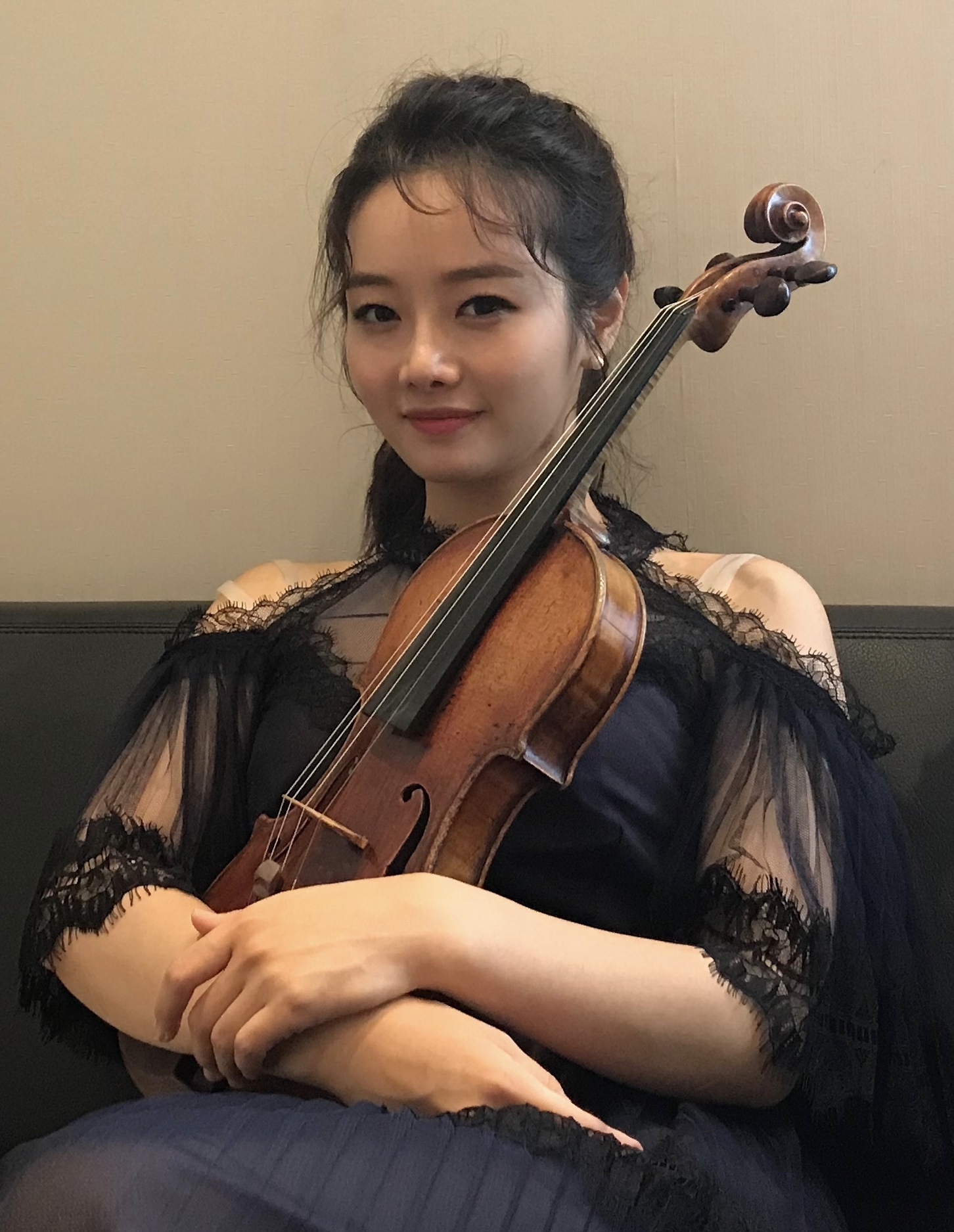
- Kim in 2018

Background information
- Born: December 13, 1989 (age 36); Daegu, South Korea
- Occupation: Classical violinist
- Labels: Warner Classics, Deutsche Grammophon
- Website: www.bomsorikim.com

Korean name
- Hangul: 김봄소리
- RR: Gim Bomsori
- MR: Kim Pomsori

Bomsori Kim (Korean: 김봄소리; born December 13, 1989) is a South Korean classical violinist. She performs internationally as a recitalist and as a soloist with orchestras.

As a violinist, Kim has won prizes at ten international violin competitions: the Tchaikovsky, Queen Elisabeth, ARD, Sibelius, Montreal, Sendai, Wieniawski, Joachim, China (Qingdao), and Schoenfeld.

In February 2021, Kim signed an exclusive agreement with Deutsche Grammophon. She plays the 1725 Guarneri del Gesù violin "ex-Moller", on loan through the Samsung Foundation of Culture and the Stradivari Society. She previously played on the 1774 J.B. Guadagnini Turin, on loan to her from Kumho Asiana Cultural Foundation.

== Early life and education ==
Bomsori Kim was born in Daegu, South Korea, on December 13, 1989. She first started playing the violin at the age of five. She moved to Seoul to attend Yewon Arts School.

Kim earned a Bachelor's degree at Seoul National University, studied with Young Uck Kim, and obtained a Master's degree and Artist Diploma at The Juilliard School under Sylvia Rosenberg and Ronald Copes as a full-scholarship recipient.

== Musical career ==
Méditation from Thaïs
The Méditation from Thaïs, performed by Bomsori Kim and Pallavi Mahidhara

As a soloist, she has appeared at numerous venues worldwide, such as Carnegie Hall, Lincoln Center David Geffen Hall, and Alice Tully Hall in New York, Musikverein Golden Hall in Vienna, Tchaikovsky Hall in Moscow, Philharmonia Hall in St. Petersburg, Slovak Radio Concert Hall in Bratislava, Finlandia Hall in Helsinki, Herkulessaal and Prinzregententheater in Munich, Berlin Philharmonic Hall and Konzerthaus in Berlin, Warsaw Philharmonic Hall in Warsaw, NOSPR Hall in Katowice, Rudolfinum and Smetana Hall in Prague, Tonhalle in Zürich, Opera City Hall and Suntory Hall in Tokyo, and Seoul Arts Center Concert Hall.

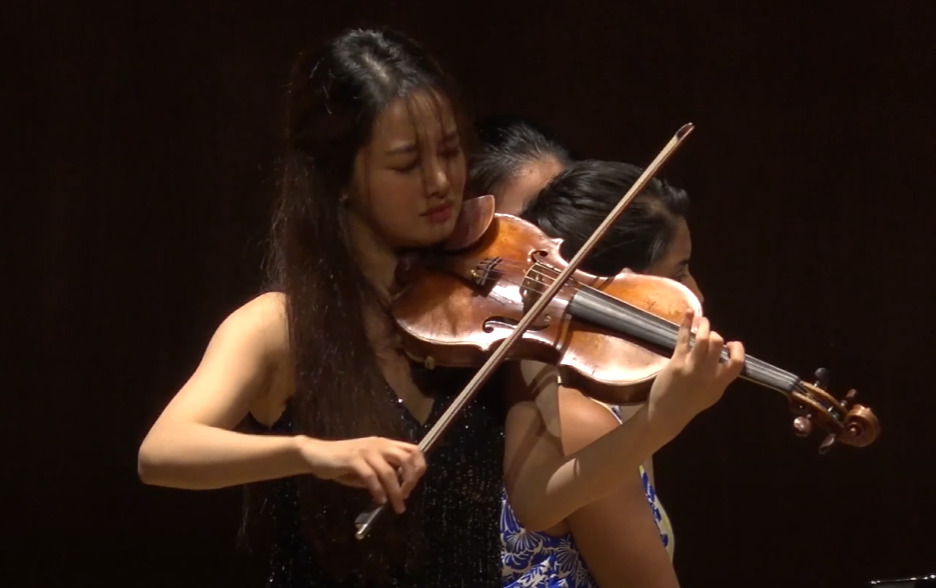
Kim performing in 2018

Kim has performed with numerous orchestras, such as the New York Philharmonic, Symphonieorchester des Bayerischen Rundfunks, San Francisco Symphony, Montreal Symphony Orchestra, National Orchestra of Belgium, Zurich Chamber Orchestra, Warsaw National Philharmonic Orchestra, NDR Radiophilharmonie, Finnish Radio Symphony Orchestra, Helsinki Philharmonic Orchestra, Camerata Salzburg, Munich Chamber Orchestra, Royal Philharmonic Orchestra, Los Angeles Philharmonic, Rotterdam Philharmonic Orchestra, Gürzenich Orchestra Cologne, Lucerne Symphony Orchestra, Prague Symphony Orchestra, Hungarian National Philharmonic, Moscow Symphony Orchestra, NFM Wrocław Philharmonic, Poznań Philharmonic, Hong Kong Philharmonic Orchestra, Singapore Symphony Orchestra, Seoul Philharmonic Orchestra, Sofia Philharmonic Orchestra and KBS Symphony Orchestra among others.

Kim has worked with conductors including Jaap van Zweden, Fabio Luisi, Vasily Petrenko, Karina Canellakis, Paavo Järvi, Giancarlo Guerrero, Jacek Kaspszyk, Hannu Lintu, Pietari Inkinen, John Storgårds, Nayden Todorov, Osmo Vänskä, Juraj Valčuha, Andrew Manze, Anu Tali, Andrey Boreyko, Ion Marin, Michał Nesterowicz, Antoni Wit, Christian Arming and Lahav Shani.

Her 2024–2025 engagements also included concerts with orchestras and presenters in Europe, North America and Asia, including appearances connected with the Royal Philharmonic Orchestra, the NFM Wrocław Philharmonic, the Luxembourg Philharmonic Orchestra, the Prague Symphony Orchestra, the Swedish Chamber Orchestra, the Taipei Symphony Orchestra, the KBS Symphony Orchestra and the Orquesta Sinfónica de Galicia.

Kim has appeared at numerous festivals, such as the Lucerne Festival, Rheingau Musik Festival, Heidelberger Frühling, Gstaad Festival, Dvořák Festival at the Rudolfinum in Prague, the Schleswig-Holstein Musik Festival, the Ravinia Festival, the Verbier Festival, the Marlboro Music Festival and the Moritzburg Festival. In 2019, she was artist-soloist-in-residence at the Poznań Philharmonic and artist-in-residence at Iserlohn Musik Festival in Germany.

== Discography ==
In 2017, Warner Classics released Kim's debut album Wieniawski/Shostakovich with maestro Jacek Kaspszyk and the Warsaw Philharmonic Orchestra, featuring Wieniawski's Violin Concerto No. 2 and Shostakovich's Violin Concerto No. 1. The BBC Music Magazine praised her playing as with "centred tone and a strong rhythmic thrust", and The Strad magazine wrote "I can't remember when I last enjoyed this concerto so much." In 2018, the album was nominated for the Fryderyk Music Award in the category Album of the Year – Orchestral Music.

In 2019, Deutsche Grammophon released her second album Fauré, Debussy, Szymanowski, Chopin with pianist Rafał Blechacz. Gramophone Magazine described her playing as "direct and ardent, with mahogany-hued lower registers contrasting with sweetly ringing, singing upper ones". In 2020, she won her first Fryderyk Music Award for the Best Polish Album Abroad.

In 2021, Kim released her debut solo album on Deutsche Grammophon, Violin on Stage, with conductor Giancarlo Guerrero and NFM Wroclaw Philharmonic Orchestra.

In 2023, Deutsche Grammophon released a recording of Carl Nielsen's Violin Concerto, Op. 33, with the Danish National Symphony Orchestra conducted by Fabio Luisi, coupled with Nielsen's Symphony No. 4, The Inextinguishable. The recording received the 2024 Opus Klassik award for concerto recording of the year in the category "violin". In 2025, she released Bruch & Korngold with the NFM Wrocław Philharmonic under Giancarlo Guerrero, featuring Max Bruch's Violin Concerto No. 1 and Erich Wolfgang Korngold's Violin Concerto.

== Awards and recognitions ==
- 2010 – Sendai International Music Competition – Fourth Prize, Audience Prize
- 2010 – International Jean Sibelius Violin Competition – Laureate
- 2011 – China International Violin Competition (Qingdao) – First Prize, Classical Music Prize, "Lin Yaoji" Prize for Outstanding Artist
- 2012 – International Joseph Joachim Violin Competition – Fifth Prize
- 2013 – ARD International Music Competition Munich – Top Prize, Special Prize for the Commissioned Piece
- 2013 – Sendai International Music Competition – Fifth Prize
- 2015 – Queen Elisabeth Competition – Laureate
- 2015 – International Tchaikovsky Competition – Fifth Prize
- 2016 – Montreal International Musical Competition – Second Prize, Radio Canada People's Choice Prize
- 2016 – Schoenfeld International String Competition – Second Prize
- 2016 – Henryk Wieniawski Violin Competition – Second Prize, Critic's Prize, nine additional Special Prizes
- 2018 – Today's Young Artist Award held by Korean Ministry of Culture, Sports, and Tourism
- 2018 – The Album of the Year Orchestral Music (nominated) – Fryderyk Music Award
- 2018 – Forbes Korea 30 under 30
- 2019 – Young Artist Award held by Korean Music Association
- 2020 – G.rium Artist Award held by SK Gas
- 2020 – The Best Polish Album Abroad – Fryderyk Music Award
- 2024 – Opus Klassik: Concerto Recording of the Year, Violin, for Nielsen's Violin Concerto with the Danish National Symphony Orchestra conducted by Fabio Luisi
