= Ellen Masaki =

American music teacher and pianist (1928–2009)

Ellen Masaki

Ellen Masaki (née Kimura, 1928–2009) was an American music teacher and pianist. During her sixty-year career, she taught nearly 3,000 children in Hawaii, including concert pianists Sean Kennard and Lisa Nakamichi. She also ran the Ellen Masaki School of Music, which had an estimated 45,000 students over fifty years.

Masaki was recognized by the Music Teachers National Association as Teacher of the Year in 2000. She was the first recipient of the award. Composer Tobias Picker was commissioned by the Honolulu Symphony to write his Piano Concerto No. 3: Kilauea, which he dedicated to Masaki, and which she premiered in 1988.
