= Lea Birringer =

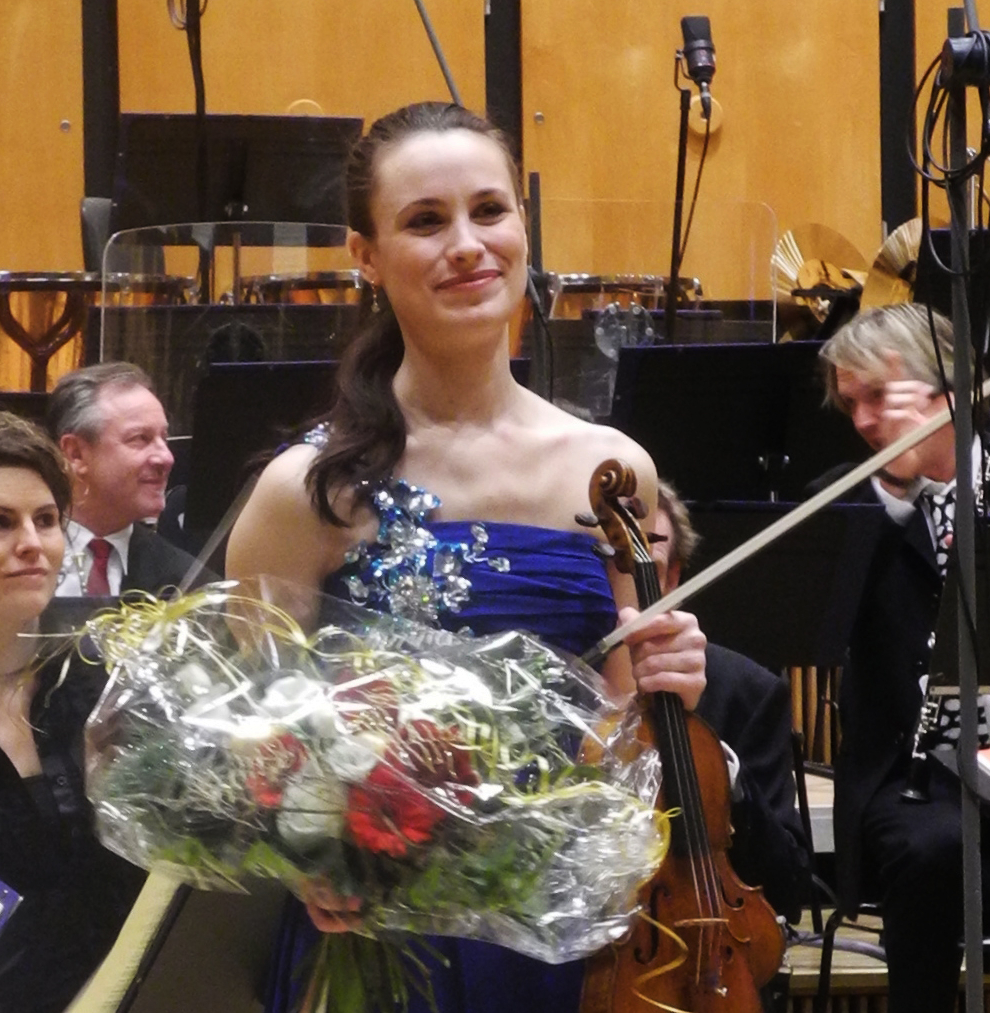

Background information
- Born: 23 November 1986 (age 38)
- Origin: Germany
- Genres: Classical music
- Instrument: Violin
- Labels: Rubicon Classics
- Website: www.leabirringer.com

Lea Birringer (born 23 November 1986) is a German classical violinist and professor at the University of Music Würzburg.

== Life and career ==
Lea Birringer's international career began at the age of 14 with her solo debut at the Berliner Philharmonie. Since then, she has been invited to international festivals, like the Salzburg Festival, MDR Musiksommer, Davos Festival, Crescendo Winter Music Festival in Florida, Festspiele Mecklenburg-Vorpommern the festival LuganoMusica or the Festival Internacional de Música Alfredo De Saint Malo in Panama. Other highlights of recent years include, among others, performances at Laeiszhalle Hamburg, Louvre Paris, Musikverein Vienna, Gasteig Munich, Konzerthaus Berlin and Teatro del Maggio Musicale Fiorentino in Florence. She has been able to demonstrate her versatility and broad repertoire, which also includes contemporary pieces as well as lesser-known works, due to her collaboration with renowned orchestras such as the Berliner Symphoniker, Orchestra Sinfonica di Roma, Polska Filharmonia Bałtycka, Deutsche Radio Philharmonie, Münchner Symphoniker, Jena Philharmonie, Robert Schumann Philharmonie, Südwestdeutsche Philharmonie Konstanz, among others.

Lea Birringer is prizewinner at the international violin competitions Kloster Schöntal, Premio Rodolfo Lipizer, Louis Spohr and Abram Yampolski. In 2008 she won the International Johannes Brahms Competition. In addition, she has been a long-time scholarship holder of the German Music Foundation. For those extraordinary accomplishments, she was honored by her hometown Saarbrücken with the Cultural Award.

An enthusiastic chamber musician, Lea Birringer collaborated with artists like Pavel Vernikov, Paul Rivinius, Atar Arad, Barbara Bonney, Eszter Haffner, Wen-Sinn Yang and Igor Levit. In 2011 Lea Birringer had a big chamber music breakthrough in collaboration with her sister and permanent Duo partner Esther (Piano). The siblings caused a furor by winning two prestigious international chamber music competitions consecutively, Premio Vittorio Gui and Concorso Internazionale di Musica da Camera Città di Pinerolo. Since then they have received numerous invitations from chamber music festivals and concert series, and have impressed audiences with their "style and full-blooded commitment."

Lea Birringer's solo album Di tanti palpiti (2019), which has received critical acclaim and radio play, has also earned her a Supersonic Award as well as nominations at the 2020 International Classical Music Awards and the Preis der deutschen Schallplattenkritik.

Lea Birringer started playing the violin at the age of three. She studied at the University Mozarteum in Salzburg under Igor Ozim, followed by Pavel Vernikov at the Conservatory in Vienna. She graduated both universities with honors. From 2012 to 2013 Lea was teaching as assistant of Pavel Vernikov at the Haute École de Musique de Lausanne, Site de Sion. At present, she is guest teacher at the Accademia d’Archi Arrigoni in Italy. She has been a lecturer at the University of Music Franz Liszt Weimar since May 2022. In 2020, when the usual concert schedule had to be largely suspended due to the COVID-19 pandemic, Lea Birringer contributed to Deutschlandfunk Kultur's "Geisterkonzertreihe" (Ghost Concert Series) with a highly acclaimed solo recital. with works by Johann Sebastian Bach, Ernst-Lothar von Knorr and Lera Auerbach, among others, she spanned the spectrum from the baroque to the modern.

== Discography ==
- 2014: Szymanovski, Hindemith, Respighi: Works for violin & piano, Published by Avi-Service for music
- 2015: Federigo Fiorillo: Violin Concerto, Sinfonia Concertante, with Accademia d'Archi Arrigoni, Published by Brilliant Classics
- 2018: Lifelines - Grieg, Liszt, Franck: Violin Sonatas, Published by Rubicon Classics
- 2019: Di Tanti Palpiti with compositions by Henryk Wieniawski, Pablo de Sarasate, Camille Saint-Saëns, Maurice Ravel, Dmitri Shostakovich, Niccolò Paganini, Mario Castelnuovo-Tedesco, Franz Waxman and Antonín Dvořák, Published by Rubicon Classics
- 2021: Transformation with compositions by Johann Sebastian Bach, Eugène Ysaÿe, Lera Auerbach, Ernst-Lothar von Knorr and Max Reger Published by Rubicon Classics
- 2022: Mendelssohn and Sinding: Violin Concertos. Published by Rubicon Classics
- 2025: Sibelius: Violin Concerto, Järnefelt: Berceuse, Szymanowski: Violin Concerto No.2, Op. 61 Published by Rubicon Classics
