= Richard Lin =

Taiwanese violinist

- 林品任
- Born: July 6, 1991 (age 34); Phoenix, Arizona
- Education: Curtis Institute of Music; Juilliard School
- Occupation: Classical violinist

Richard Lin (Chinese: 林品任) (born 6 July 1991 at United States) is a Taiwanese American violinist. He won competitions in Poland, United States, Singapore, Japan, and Taiwan. In 2013 he won the first prize in the Sendai International Music Competition. In 2015 he was the third prize laureate in the 9th International Joseph Joachim Violin Competition in Hanover, Germany. In 2016 he was the fifth prize laureate in 15th Henryk Wieniawski Violin Competition. In 2018 he won First Prize in 10th International Violin Competition of Indianapolis.

== Life and career ==
Born in the United States and raised in Taichung, Taiwan, Richard Lin began his violin studies at the age of 4. In Taiwan, he studied with Gregory Lee. Since 2008 he has studied at the Curtis Institute of Music, under professor Aaron Rosand. Since 2013 he has studied at Juilliard School, under professors Lewis Kaplan. In 2011 he took the second place in 6th Michael Hill International Violin Competition in New Zealand. In 2013 he won the first prize in 5th Sendai International Music Competition. In 2015 he was the second prize laureate in Singapore International Violin Competition, and the third prize laureate in 9th Joseph Joachim International Violin Competition Hannover. He has appeared as a soloist with Sendai Philharmonic Orchestra, Auckland Philharmonic Orchestra, Oklahoma City Philharmonic, National Symphony Orchestra (Taiwan), National Taiwan Symphony Orchestra, Taipei Symphony Orchestra, Royal Chamber Orchestra of Wallonia, Yokohama Sinfonietta, Macau String Association Orchestra, and Academy of Taiwan Strings. He has also given many solo recitals in Japan, Taiwan, and the United States. He currently resides in New York City.

== Awards ==
- 2011: Second Prize in the 6th Michael Hill International Violin Competition in New Zealand
- 2013: First Prize and Audience Prize in the 5th Sendai International Music Competition
- 2015: Second Prize, Goh Soon Tioe Violin and Piano Recital Prize and Audience Prize in the 1st Singapore International Violin Competition
- 2015: Third Prize and JJV Community Award, 9th International Joseph Joachim Violin Competition, Hanover, Germany
- 2016: Fifth Prize in the 1st Shanghai Isaac Stern International Violin Competition
- 2016: Fifth Prize in the 15th Henryk Wieniawski Violin Competition
- 2018: First Prize in the 10th International Violin Competition of Indianapolis

== Recordings ==
- Beethoven, Bartok, Brahms – Richard Lin and Sendai Philharmonic Orchestra (FONTEC: FOCD-9612)
- Brahms: Violin Sonatas (FONTEC: FOCD-9653)

== See also ==
- List of Taiwanese Americans
