= Ernst-Lothar von Knorr =

German composer, music educator and civil servant

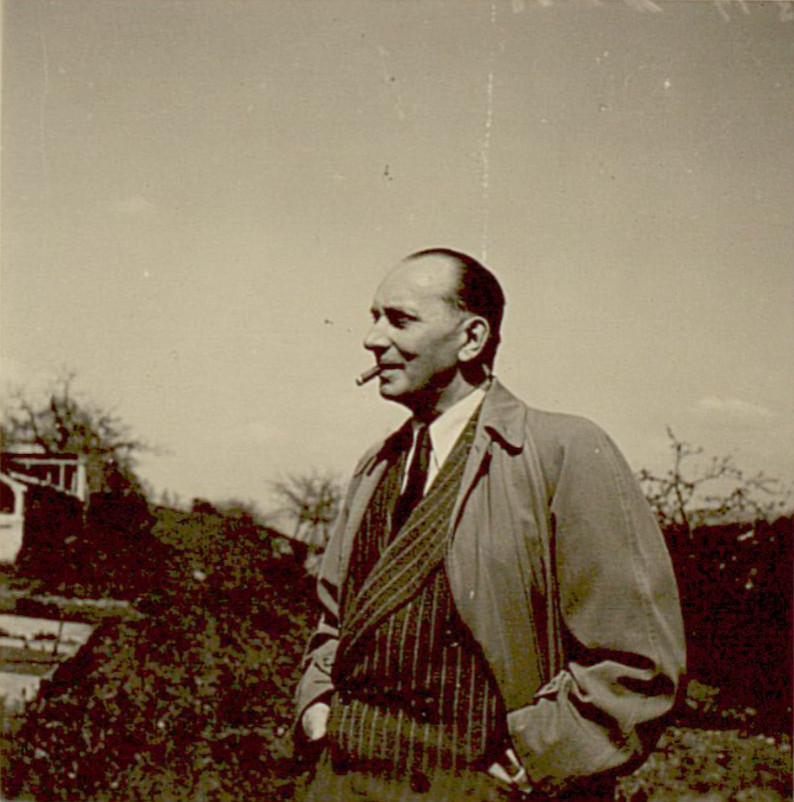
Ernst-Lothar von Knorr

Ernst-Lothar von Knorr (2 January 1896 – 30 October 1973) was a German composer, music educator and civil servant.

== The years until 1933 ==
Born in Eitorf, Knorr grew up in Bonn. His parents were the pharmacist Dr. chem. Karl Ferdinand von Knorr and Eugenie Sophie Merten. From 1902 he had his first violin lessons. In 1907 he was admitted to the Cologne Conservatory. After graduating from high school, conservatory examination and military service, he became a violin teacher at the Heidelberg Music Academy in 1919, and in 1920 he founded the Heidelberg Chamber Orchestra Association with P. Gies. On 6 October 1923 he married in Gummersbach Elise Siebel, a granddaughter of Lebrecht Steinmüller, the co-founder of the paper mill L&C Steinmüller. In the same year he became Concert master with the orchestra of the Diaghilev Ballet in Munich, in 1924 followed the establishment and direction of the Volks- und Jugendmusikschule-Süd in Berlin. In 1925 and 1928 his son Friedrich-Carl and his daughter Ellen were born. A third child (Angelika, *1944) died shortly after birth.

== Professional career during the Third Reich ==
In 1937 von Knorr became a teacher at the Staatliche Hochschule für Musik in Berlin, where he received a professorship in 1939. From 1937 to the 31st century. From 1937 until August 31, 1941 he was additionally music adviser of the Oberkommando des Heeres and was promoted to Captain, then to Major of the Wehrmacht. Towards the end of his term of office as music adviser of the OKH, in 1941, together with the General and later Resistance fighter of the 20 July plot, he compiled with Eduard Wagner a list of various music creators, which was signed by Adolf Hitler and meant a Unabkömmlichstellung (UK) und Zurückstellung of 360 musicians. Knorr also appointed some musicians as teachers at the army music schools, exempting them from active military service.

After his term of office as music consultant of the OKH, he was appointed on 31 August 1941, against the resistance of Herbert Gerigk and the Amt Rosenberg deputy director of the Hochschule für Musik und Darstellende Kunst Frankfurt am Main and the military music school in Frankfurt. In 1942 he joined the NSDAP (member number: 8.995.057).

== The years since 1945 ==
As late as 1944 von Knorr began building up the Staatliche Hochschule für Musik Trossingen, where he was also director. In 1945 he was removed from his post as a senior civil servant, but in 1948 he received a certificate stating that he had only been "slightly [Nazi] burdened" and was able to continue his work. However, the university was constantly threatened with closure; von Knorr therefore soon applied for other positions. In 1952 he became director of the Hochschule für Musik, Theater und Medien Hannover. From 1955 he was also military music advisor to Theodor Blank, the first Minister of Defence of the Federal Republic of Germany,

In 1956, his wife Elise died after a long illness. Two years later, von Knorr married the Swedish music student Britt-Gun Lidin. After his retirement in 1961, von Knorr took over the direction of the University of Music and Theatre in his home town of Heidelberg until 1969.

In 1961 Knorr received the Grand Order of Merit of the Federal Republic of Germany.

== Legacy ==
In 2014, Knorr's written estate was transferred to the Badische Landesbibliothek as a gift. It contains documents of various kinds, including compositions, extensive correspondence, manuscripts, photographs, etc., from the period from 1944 until his death in 1973 at the age of 77. Earlier documents do not exist, since Knorr's apartment at the time was destroyed in a bombing raid on Frankfurt in 1944, and his documents, including the manuscripts of his compositions up to that time, were almost completely destroyed.

== Literature ==
- Jasmin Hambsch: „Einleitung“, in dies.: Nachlass Ernst-Lothar von Knorr – Findbuch. Karlsruhe 2018, online
- Ernst-Lothar von Knorr: Lebenserinnerungen. Erlebtes musikalisches Geschehen in Deutschland. from the estate published by the Ernst-Lothar von Knorr-Stiftung, with an introduction by Thomas Schipperges. P. J. Tonger Musikverlag, Köln-Rodenkirchen 1996, ISBN 3-920950-25-9.
- Ernst Lothar von Knorr, Munzinger in Internationales Biographisches Archiv. 45/1960, 31 October 1960
