= International Joseph Joachim Violin Competition =

German violin competition

The International Joseph Joachim Violin Competition, Hanover (also: International Violin Competition Hanover or Joseph Joachim International Violin Competition Hanover) is one of the best-endowed awards worldwide. It is held in Hanover, triennially, for a total of 12 young violinists. The competition is run before an international jury and is dedicated to the violinist Joseph Joachim, who also worked in Hanover. The aim of the competition, organized by the Lower Saxony Foundation, is to support artists on their way to an international career, to promote classical music traditions, education and practice, and to promote the Lower Saxony state capital as a metropolis of music. Partners of the competition are the Hanover University of Music, Drama and Media (HMTMH), the Hanover State Opera, the North German Broadcasting Corporation (NDR) with its NDR Radiophilharmonie, the radio NDR Kultur, the Fritz Behrens Foundation, Warner Classics, G. Henle Verlag and several companies. The competition is a member of the World Federation of International Music Competitions in Geneva.

== History ==
On the initiative of the musician Krzysztof Węgrzyn, and launched in 1991 by the Lower Saxony Foundation, the Hanover International Violin Competition was organized for the first time in the same year. The head of the Foundation's programme department organized the competition, while Węgrzyn, concertmaster of the Lower Saxony State Orchestra, and also a professor at the HMTMH, took on the artistic direction.

== Procedure ==
Each competition programme lasts around two weeks. Competitors and their companions can be accepted and looked after by various host families in and around Hanover free of charge. There is an accompanying programme with extensive outreach under the categories:

- Visiting Lower Saxony as a regional concert,
- Visiting the classroom for performances in schools,
- the Expert Forum Auditorium
- the Master Course Musical Collegium,

-with the aim that the performance of the competition participants should be carried as “far into the country as possible and enable access to classical music to a broad audience".

Previously, in five rounds, 35 selected musicians demonstrate their virtuosity and expressiveness to the international jury of at least ten people, chaired by Krzysztof Wegrzyn, aiming to earn the title of „Preisträger des Internationalen Joseph Joachim Violinwettbewerbs, Hannover“ ("Prize Winner of the Joseph Joachim International Violin Competition, Hanover"). In 2021 the competition format changed somewhat, for example, the upper age limit was raised to 32.

== Prizes ==
A total of 140,000 euros will be awarded in the form of prize money to twelve outstanding participants. The competition prizes include grants and debut concerts. Prize money of 50,000, 30,000 and 20,000 euros will be awarded for the first three places in the violin competition, as well as numerous other considerable cash prizes for the semi-finalists. The first prize winner is given the opportunity to produce a CD with the Naxos company, as well as “debut recitals and concerts with orchestras and ensembles of international standing”.

Since 2009, the award winners have been given a golden statuette depicting a figure playing the violin, created by the German artist Sebastian Peetz.

The Fritz Behrens Foundation temporarily loans the winners of the competition a violin that was made by Giovanni Battista Guadagnini in Parma around 1765.

In 2012, first prize was awarded twice for the first time and second place was not awarded. That year the 3rd prize winner also received the 5,000 Euro Critics' Prize and the Audience Prize.

== Award winners ==
Winners of the International Joseph Joachim Violin Competition
Year	1st prize	2nd prize	3rd prize
1991	(Germany) Antje Weithaas	(United States) Catherine Cho	(Poland) Bartlomiej Niziol
1994	(Taiwan) Robert Chen	(Russia) Anton Barachovsky	(Germany) Latica Honda-Rosenberg
1997	(Japan) Michiko Kamiya	(Italy) Francesco Manara	(China) Bin Huang
2000	(China) Frank Huang	(Ukraine) Andrey Bielow	(Germany) Arabella Steinbacher
2003	(Serbia and Montenegro) (France) Nemanja Radulovic	(Japan) Saeka Matsuyama	(China) Ning Feng
2006	(Germany) Suyoen Kim	(South Korea) Hyun-Su Shin	(Japan) Kana Sugimura
2009	(Japan) Fumiaki Miura	(Germany) Clara-Jumi Kang	(South Korea) Yura Lee
2012	(South Korea) Dami Kim (Moldova) Alexandra Conunova-Dumortier (tie)	Not awarded	(Germany) Tobias Feldmann
2015	(Russia) Sergei Dogadin	(Japan) Shion Minami	(United States) Richard Lin
2018	(Canada) Timothy Chooi	(Ukraine) Dmytro Udovychenko	(France) Cosima Soulez Larivière

Year	Joseph Joachim Award (1st Prize)	Laureates (Finalists)	Reference
2021	(United States) Maria Ioudenitch	(Spain) Javier Comesaña (Germany) Chiara Sannicandro (Japan) Minami Yoshida	
2024	(Hong Kong) Angela Sin Ying Chan (Canada) Jacques Forestier (tie)	(South Korea) Kyumin Park	

== Literature ==
- Hugo Thielen: Internationaler Violin-Wettbewerb Hannover. (International Violin Competition Hanover) In: Klaus Mlynek, Waldemar R. Röhrbein (Hrsg.) u. a.: Stadtlexikon Hannover. Von den Anfängen bis in die Gegenwart. (City Lexicon Hanover. From the beginning to the present) Schlütersche, Hannover 2009, ISBN 978-3-89993-662-9, S. 318.
- Stefan Arndt: Internationaler Violinwettwerb / Violinwettbewerb kürt gleich zwei Sieger (International violin competition / violin competition selects two winners), 12 October 2012, accessed 2 February 2021
