= Vyacheslav Gryaznov =

Russian classical pianist and arranger

- Born: 15 January 1982 (age 44); Yuzhno-Sakhalinsk, USSR
- Occupations: Pianist and arranger
- Musical career
- Genres: Classical music
- Instruments: Piano
- Labels: Melodiya, Firma
- Website: gryaznoff.com

Vyacheslav Gryaznov (Russian: Вячеслав Грязнов; born 15 January 1982) is a Russian classical pianist and arranger. His diverse repertoire ranges from Baroque figures such as Domenico Scarlatti to Russian composers and more recent music. He is particularly well known for his many piano transcriptions of older masterworks.

== Life and career ==
Vyacheslav Gryaznov was born on 15 January 1982 in Yuzhno-Sakhalinsk, on Sakhalin island, then a part of the Russian SFSR in the Soviet Union. Gryaznov was musically talented from an early age; his parents moved to Moscow for his music education.

In 2006, he studied at the Moscow Conservatory under Yuri Slesarev and post-graduate studies in 2009. Since 2008, he has held the position of teaching assistant in the Piano Department of the Moscow Conservatory. Beginning with the 2008/2009 concert season, V. Gryaznov has belonged to the Moscow Philharmonic Society which represents him in Russia. Since 2012, he has worked as a visiting professor of piano at Kurashiki Sakuyo University of Science and Arts in Japan. In 2014 Vyacheslav signed a contract with Schott Music, the leading publisher for classical and contemporary music.

As a soloist, Gryaznov has given numerous recitals throughout Russia, Ukraine, Georgia, Asia, and Europe, and has performed concertos with the Russian Philharmonic Orchestra in Tchaikovsky Concert Hall, Moscow; performed and conducted Mozart’s Concerto K. 449 in Vladimir at a concert of the “Stars of the XXI century” series; and the Wissembourg Symphony Orchestra. His performance repertoire includes works that span the entire piano literature, from Domenico Scarlatti, Monteverdi, Bach or Mozart to modern composers such as Ravel, Gershwin or Ginastera.

== Recordings ==
In addition to extensive recordings of live performances, Vyacheslav Gryaznoff recorded the CD “To Rachmaninov and his beloved Ivanovka,” a collection of his own transcriptions and works by Rachmaninov; and Alexander Tchaikovsky’s Sonata No. 2 on the Firma Melodiya label. Gryaznov recorded his own piano transcriptions of Russian masterworks by Rachmaninov, Borodin, Prokofiev, Glinka and Tchaikovsky in a studio album released in 2018 under the label Steinway & Sons. In 2021, he released the CD "Western Piano Transcriptions" under the label Master Performers including piano arrangements of famous works by Mahler, Grieg, Debussy or Ravel.

== Awards and prizes ==
- Rubinstein International Competition in Moscow (1997, 1st Prize)
- The First Russian President Award (1997)
- To the memory of Rachmaninov” Competition in Italy (1998, 1st Prize)
- Grant by V. Spivakov Foundation (1999–2003)
- Competition of Young Performers in Denmark (2001, Grand Prix)
- XXI Century Art» Competition in Ukraine (2001, Grand Prix)
- Tbilisi Competition (Georgia, 2001, «Audience Favourite» Prize)
- Grant by Russian Performing Art Foundation (2002)
- Yamaha Scholarship (2002)
- Grant by M. Rostropovich Foundation (H.Neuhaus award, 2002–2003)
- Sendai International Music Competition, Japan (2007, 6th Prize)
- Rachmaninov Competition in Moscow (2008, 2nd Prize)
- Honored Citizen of Bryansk (2011)
- New York Concert Artists & Associates Worldwide Debut Audition winner, Piano category (2016)
