= Sendai International Music Competition =

International violin and piano competition in Japan

- Sendai International Music Competition logo
- Awarded for: Exceptional piano and violin performance
- Country: Japan
- Presented by: Sendai International Music Competition
- First award: 2001
- Website: https://simc.jp/en/ (in English)

The Sendai International Music Competition is a triennial violin and piano music competition held in Sendai, Japan, presented in association with the Sendai International Music Competition Organizing Committee, City of Sendai and the Sendai Cultural Foundation. In the competition there is no overall winner, rather there are six winners each from the violin and piano categories, with the first-placed winners receiving the highest prize. Although the competition is international, most award-winners have been from either Europe or Asia. The first award-winner from outside those continents was American Sean Kennard, who finished fifth in the 2004 competition's piano category.

== History ==
The Sendai International Music Competition is held every three years. at the Sendai City Youth Cultural Centre in Japan. It has the stated purpose of "contributing to the development of world musical culture and the promotion of international cultural exchange through the discovery of young talented musicians". It was established in 2001 to commemorate Sendai City's 400th anniversary, and has been a member of the World Federation of International Music Competitions (WFIMC) since 2005. Five competitions have been held, the most recent being in 2013, with the next scheduled to take place on 21 May to 26 June 2016.

== Format ==
The competition consists of four stages: a pre-selection round, followed by a preliminary round, and then the semi-final and the final rounds in which all pieces are performed with an orchestra. The competition is split into two categories: violin and piano. The number of contestants who progress from the preliminary round to the semi-finals cannot exceed 12 and the contestants passing through to the final cannot exceed six. In the preliminary, semi-final, and final stages of the competition the performances are chosen from a predetermined repertoire; the contestants must choose a different piece for each round. The judging panel decides the placing of the prizewinners from first through sixth. The prize money is as follows:

Place	Cash prize	Additional prizes
First	¥3,000,000 (~25,000 USD)	Diploma and Gold Medal
Second	¥2,000,000 (~17,000 USD)	Diploma and Silver Medal
Third	¥1,000,000 (~8,500 USD)	Diploma and Bronze Medal
Fourth	¥800,000 (~6,750 USD)	Diploma
Fifth	¥700,000 (~6,000 USD)	Diploma
Sixth	¥600,000 (~5,000 USD)	Diploma

== Winners ==
The first competition was held in 2001. Chinese Mengla Huang and Bulgarian Svetlin Roussev topped the violin category and the Italian Giuseppe Andaloro took first prize in the piano section. In the second tournament in 2004, Japanese Saeka Matsuyama won the violin part in the final and Xiaotang Tan from China came in first place in the piano category. In the 2007 finals, which contained five Russian contestants, the violin section was topped by Russian Alena Baeva while in the piano category the Japanese Yuya Tsuda came first. The 2010 violin competition was won by the German/South Korean Clara-Jumi Kang, while Vadym Kholodenko of Ukraine won the piano competition. As of 2013 there have been five competitions.

=== 2001 ===
Category	Place	Winner	Country
Violin	First	Mengla Huang	China
Violin	First	Svetlin Roussev	Bulgaria
Violin	Third	Mi Sa Yang	South Korea
Violin	Fourth	Yukiko Ishibashi	Japan
Violin	Fifth	Rintaro Omiya	South Korea
Violin	Sixth	Kei Shirai	Japan
Piano	First	Giuseppe Andaloro	Italy
Piano	Second	Jin Sang Lee	South Korea
Piano	Third	Wang Yuja	China
Piano	Fourth	Daria Rabotkina	Russia
Piano	Fifth	Roberto Plano	Italy
Piano	Fifth	Amir Tebenikhin	Kazakhstan

=== 2004 ===
Category	Place	Prize winners	Country
Violin	First	Saeka Matsuyama	Japan
Violin	Second	Maksim Brylinskiy	Ukraine
Violin	Third	Dan Zhu	China
Violin	Fourth	Andreas Janke	Japan
Violin	Fifth	Valya Dervenska	Bulgaria
Violin	Sixth	Yuki Manuela Janke	Japan
Piano	First	Xiaotang Tan	China
Piano	Second	Masataka Takada	Japan
Piano	Third	Michael Namirovsky	Israel
Piano	Fourth	Elizaveta Dmitrieva	Russia
Piano	Fifth	Sean Kennard	USA
Piano	Sixth	Florence Boissolle	France

=== 2007 ===
Category	Place	Prize winners	Country
Violin	First	Alena Baeva	Russia
Violin	Second	Erin Keefe	USA
Violin	Third	A-Rah Shin	South Korea
Violin	Fourth	Andrey Baranov	Russia
Violin	Fifth	Sayaka Chiba	Japan
Violin	Sixth	Haurka Nagao	Japan
Piano	First	Yuya Tsuda	Japan
Piano	Second	Yi-Chih Lu	Taiwan
Piano	Third	Oxana Shevchenko	Russia
Piano	Fourth	Ilya Ovchinnikov	Russia
Piano	Fifth	Ka-Ling Colleen Lee	Hong Kong
Piano	Sixth	Vyacheslav Gryaznov	Russia

=== 2010 ===
Category	Place	Prize winners	Country
Violin	First	Clara-Jumi Kang	Germany/South Korea
Violin	Second	Andrey Baranov	Russia
Violin	Third	Nagao Haruka	Japan
Violin	Fourth	Kim Bomsori	South Korea
Violin	Fifth	Kim Dami	South Korea
Violin	Sixth	Giora Schmidt	USA
Piano	First	Vadym Kholodenko	Ukraine
Piano	Second	Maria Masycheva	Russia
Piano	Third	Marianna Prjevalskaya	Spain
Piano	Fourth	Sato Hiroo	Japan
Piano	Fifth	Moon Zheeyoung	South Korea
Piano	Sixth	Kwan Yi	USA

=== 2013 ===
Category	Place	Prize winners	Country
Violin	First	Richard Lin	Taiwan
Violin	Second	Narita Tatsuki	Japan
Violin	Third	Tomii Chieri	Japan
Violin	Fourth	Anna Savkina	Russia
Violin	Fifth	Bomsori Kim	South Korea
Violin	Sixth	Suliman Tekalli	USA
Piano	First	Sunwoo Yekwon	South Korea
Piano	Second	Suh Hyung-Min	South Korea
Piano	Third	Artem Yasynskyy	Ukraine
Piano	Fourth	Sun-A Park	USA
Piano	Fifth	Katada Airi	Japan
Piano	Sixth	Hong Jihwan	South Korea

=== 2016 ===
Category	Place	Prize winners	Country
Violin	First	Jang Yoojin	South Korea
Violin	Second	Stephen Kim	USA
Violin	Third	Aoki Naoka	Japan
Violin	Fourth	Anna Savkina	Russia
Violin	Fifth	Meruert Karmenova	Kazakhstan
Violin	Sixth	Okamoto Seiji	Japan
Piano	First	Kim Hyun Jung	South Korea
Piano	Second	Evan Wong	Taiwan
Piano	Third	Kitabata Yoshito	Japan
Piano	Fourth	Bruce Xiaoyu Liu	Canada
Piano	Fifth	Shin Changyong	South Korea
Piano	Sixth	Sakamoto Aya	Japan

=== 2019 ===
Category	Place	Prize winners	Country
Violin
Violin	First	No Award	
Violin	Second	Shannon Lee	USA
Violin	Third	Tomotaki Mayu	Japan
Violin	Fourth	Kitada Chihiro	Japan
Violin	Fifth	Elias David Moncado	Germany
Violin	Sixth	Arai Rio	Japan
Violin	Sixth	Ko Donghwi	South Korea
Piano	First	Choi Hyounglok	South Korea
Piano	Second	Baron Fenwick	USA
Piano	Third	Daria Parkhomenko	Russia
Piano	Fourth	Sato Motohiro	Japan
Piano	Fifth	Hirama Kyoshiro	Japan
Piano	Sixth	Kim Junhyung	South Korea

=== 2022 ===
Category	Place	Prize winners	Country
Violin
Violin	First	Nakano Lina	Japan
Violin	Second	Dennis Gasanov	Russia
Violin	Second	Ma Tianyou	China
Violin	Third	No Award	
Violin	Fourth	Hong Seonglan	South Korea
Violin	Fifth	Kitsuwa Miyu	Japan
Violin	Sixth	Nakamura Yukino	Japan
Piano	First	Jiaqing Luo	China
Piano	Second	Jonas Aumiller	Germany
Piano	Third	Ota Shion	Japan
Piano	Fourth	Jeonghwan Kim	Germany
Piano	Fifth	Kim Song Hueon	South Korea
Piano	Sixth	George Harliono	United Kingdom

=== 2025 ===
Category	Place	Prize winners	Country
Violin
Violin	First	No Award	
Violin	Second	Boha Moon	South Korea
Violin	Third	Aozhe Zhang	China
Violin	Fourth	Jinzhu Li	China
Violin	Fifth	Seohyeon Park	South Korea
Violin	Sixth	Haram Kim	South Korea
Violin	Sixth	Hairui Lei	China
Piano	First	Elizaveta Ukrainskaia	Russia
Piano	Second	Aleksandr Kliuchko	Russia
Piano	Third	Amano Kaoru	Japan
Piano	Fourth	Julian Gast	Germany
Piano	Fifth	Shimata Riito	Japan
Piano	Sixth	Jan Nikovich	Croatia
