= Maria-Elisabeth Lott =

German violinist (born 1987)

- Born: June 2, 1987 (age 39)
- Origin: Germany
- Occupation: Violinist

Maria-Elisabeth Lott (born 2 June 1987) is a German violinist.

Lott was born in 1987 in Schramberg, Baden-Württemberg. At the age of three, she began playing the violin. In 1998, Lott was selected as the first musician to play the restored violin Wolfgang Amadeus Mozart played as a child. Lott has been awarded numerous music awards and is internationally recognized as one of the best young German violinists. She currently plays to audiences worldwide with renowned orchestras such as the Dallas Symphony Orchestra, the Residentie Orchestra, the Istanbul State Symphony Orchestra, the Bergen Philharmonic Orchestra, the Royal Scottish National Orchestra and the Malaysian Philharmonic Orchestra.
