= Lee Hyun-su =

South Korean writer

- Hangul: 이현수
- Hanja: 李賢洙
- RR: I Hyeonsu
- MR: I Hyŏnsu

Lee Hyun-su (Korean: 이현수; born 1959) is a South Korean writer. She is the recipient of the Hahn Moo-Sook Literary Prize and the Mu-young Literary Prize.

== Early life and education ==
Lee was born in Yeongdong, Chungcheongbuk-do in 1959. She graduated from Yeungnam University in textile studies.

== Literary career ==
Lee began her literary career when her short story The Sign of Disaster Came From The Finger (그 재난의 조짐은 손가락에서부터 시작되었다) won the 1991 Chungcheong Ilbo New Writer's Award. Later, she won the 1997 Munhakdongne Winter Literary Contest with her short story Between Dry Days (마른 날들 사이에) and began to commit to writing full-time. She published story collections Taro (토란), and The Rose Tree Cupboard (장미나무 식기장), as well as novels New Tales of Gisaeng (신기생뎐), The Woman From the House on the Road (길갓집 여자), and 4 Days (나흘).

== Writing ==
In her commentary for winning the Munhakdongne Winter Literary Contest in 1997, Lee voiced her thoughts on the definition of a novel.

To me, a novel is like a cheating husband. An unkind husband who chases young women, while casting me out, only giving me his arm when old and frail. When I was a newly wed, I tried to turn that cheating husband’s heart around, doing things I’ve never done like putting make up on, and trying to awkwardly flirt, but it was all for nothing. As a deserted wife, I couldn’t even try to run away. On nights when he wasn’t there, I ground my teeth, vowing to get back at him when old, as I washed the bedsheets. And in old age, he comes to me and gives me his arm, as if he is being generous. A petty husband who instead of warmly hugging me, dares me to cut him down. It’s not really an exaggeration, and I wonder what draws me to that husband.

Lee's thoughts on fiction that spoke of a cheating husband was a conservative stance that was both alien, and a challenge. Her work New Tales of Gisaeng, which narrates the lives of gisaengs in Gunsan and 4 Days, which chases after the hidden history of the No Gun Ri Massacre, can be seen as her literary self-confirmations.

Critic Jang Eunsu, in describing the characters of New Tales of Gisaeng described Lee's fiction: “The high achievements of Lee Hyun-su’s fiction are at times hidden by the ‘tastes of her sentences’. The author's focused interest due to her unwillingness to leave out even the smallest detail of the lives of her characters, actually becomes an obstacle in entering that character's life and its vivid reality. Our pitiful minds that must adapt to the fast pace and rhythm of civilization, are surprised and startled by the excitement of the sentence that rises within our body like a somewhat familiar monster. (abridged...) As a traditional artist of language, Lee Hyun-su ties fantastic descriptions and rich dialogue, and tenaciously tells the life journey of the people of the Buyonggak. The gisaeng house culture, now being helplessly forgotten within the tides of modernization, is depicted in a rich miniature. And she carefully records the life of the gisaeng, who has “learned the feeling of pain before even coming of age.” As Jang Eunsu states, Lee Hyun-su is our generation's “traditional artist of language."

== Works ==
=== Short story collections ===
- Toran (토란; Taro), Munidang, 2003.
- Jangminamu sikgijang (장미나무 식기장; The Rose Tree Cupboard), Munhakdongne, 2009.

=== Novels ===
- Gilgatjip yeoja (길갓집 여자; The Woman From the House on the Road), Iroom, 2000.
- Singisaengdyeon (신기생뎐; New Tales of Gisaeng), Munhakdongne, 2005.
- Naheul (나흘; 4 Days), Munhakdongne, 2013.

=== Works in translation ===
- Au lotus d'or : Histoires de courtisanes (French)
- СКАЗАНИЕ О НОВЪIХ КИСЭН (Russian)
- Die letzte Gisaeng: Roman (German)

== Awards ==
- 15th Hahn Moo-Sook Literary Prize (2010)
- 2nd The Violet People's Literature Award (2007)
- Mu-young Literary Prize (2003)
- 2nd Kim Yujung Literature Prize (1996)
