= Lewis Kaplan =

- Born: November 10, 1933 (age 92); Passaic, New Jersey
- Genres: Classical, Bach, Baroque
- Occupations: pedagogue, violinist, conductor
- Instrument: Violin
- Years active: 1951–present
- Website: lewiskaplan.net

Lewis Kaplan (born November 10, 1933) is an American violinist, and pedagogue. He is a senior professor in violin and chamber music at the Juilliard School and has been on the faculty at Mannes School of Music since 1987, both located in New York City.

== Early life ==
He was born in Passaic, New Jersey.

A graduate of The Juilliard School–where he earned both bachelor's and master's degrees in violin studies studying under Ivan Galamian (1901-1981), one of the greatest violin pedagogues of the 20th Century, and conducting under Jean Morel–Kaplan began teaching at the prestigious conservatory in 1964 and is presently a senior professor in violin and chamber music.

== Career ==
=== Teaching ===
In 2016, Kaplan co-founded and was named Artistic Director of the Portland Bach Festival in Portland, Maine.

Kaplan is a founder of the Aeolian Chamber Players and a co-founder of the Bowdoin International Music Festival. He has served on the juries of numerous international competitions, including the Queen Elisabeth Competition in Brussels, Fritz Kreisler (Vienna), Mozart International (Salzburg), Japan International (Tokyo), Sendai, Joachim (Hanover), Naumburg and Concert Artists Guild (New York) and Henryk Szeryng International (Monaco).

Kaplan is a visiting professor at the Royal College of Music in London and an honorary professor at the Xi'an Conservatory of Music in China. He has presented master classes at most of the well-known conservatories and schools worldwide, including the Mozarteum Summer Academy in Salzburg, Austria where he taught for 20 years.

Kaplan's chamber and violin students have included Yo-Yo Ma, Emanuel Ax, Pinchas Zukerman, Kyung-Wha Chung.

=== Performing ===
Kaplan has made numerous television appearances and has premiered more than 100 works, both as a soloist and with the Aeolian Chamber Players, by most of the well-known composers worldwide. He has recorded for Columbia/CBS Masterworks (Sony), CRI, Folkways and Odyssey Records.

Kaplan has appeared as violin soloist and as a conductor in Europe, Asia, and North America. He has performed as well with Michael Rabin, Jaime Laredo, Szymon Goldberg, Ruggiero Ricci, pianists Yefim Bronfman, Richard Goode, Rudolf Firkusny, Murray Perahia, Horacio Gutierrez and many others.

== Personal life ==
He resides on the Upper West Side in New York City with his wife, Adria.

== Sources ==
- Official site.
- Sendai International Music Competition 2007
- Bowdoin International Music Festival
- Mannes College The New School for Music in New York City
