= Shanghai Isaac Stern International Violin Competition =

Biennial music competition in China

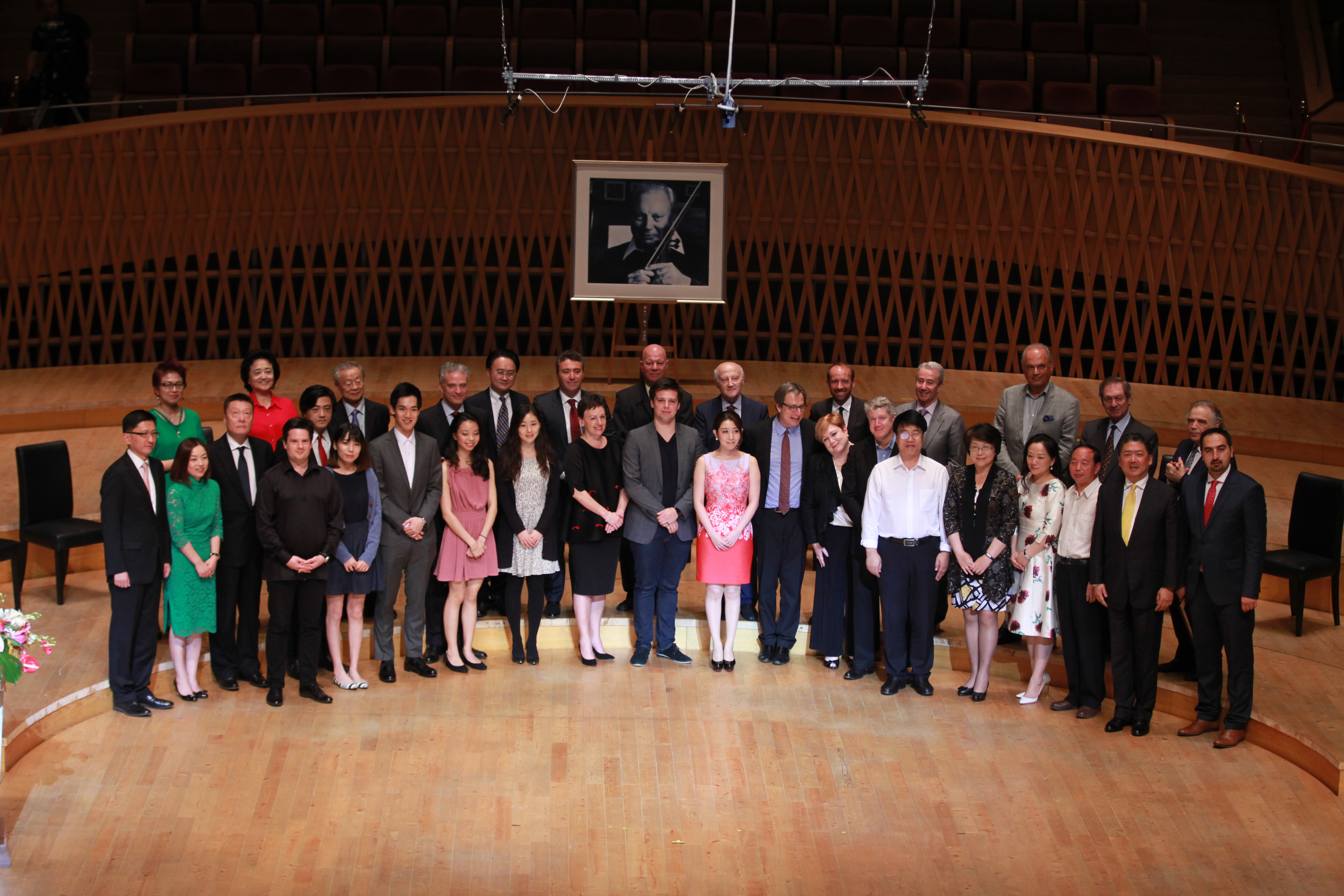
2016 Shanghai Isaac Stern International Violin Competition Awards Ceremony

The Shanghai Isaac Stern International Violin Competition (SISIVC) is a biennial violin competition in commemoration of violinist Isaac Stern, which takes place in Shanghai, China. The inaugural competition took place August–September 2016 offering $100,000 as the first place prize, the largest single cash prize ever in an international violin competition.

== History ==
In honor of Isaac Stern and his significant contribution to classical music in China, Maestro Long Yu led the path to establish the competition working closely with Isaac Stern's family. Stern's influence began with a historic trip in 1979 after the Chinese Cultural Revolution and just after China's long period of isolation from the rest of the world. His visit to China included both performances across the country and masterclasses with Chinese students at China's Central Conservatory of Music and the Shanghai Conservatory of Music where he imparted lasting musical advice. Yu, just a teenager at the time, was among those in the audience and among the many influenced by Stern's musicianship and knowledge. The Academy Award-winning film, From Mao to Mozart documents Stern's trip. Although Stern expressed distaste in competitions during his lifetime, the Stern family, including his sons Michael and David, worked with Yu to develop a structure including chamber music and Chinese music, which were important to Isaac Stern, in order to establish a competition he would be happy with.

The Shanghai Symphony Orchestra hosts the competition with Maestro Yu as president. The organization committee includes David Stern. The competition offers the highest single cash prize for any international violin competition, $100,000. In an effort to ensure transparency, the competition took an unprecedented step in publishing the scores and comments of eliminated participants as well as winners.

== 2016 inaugural competition ==
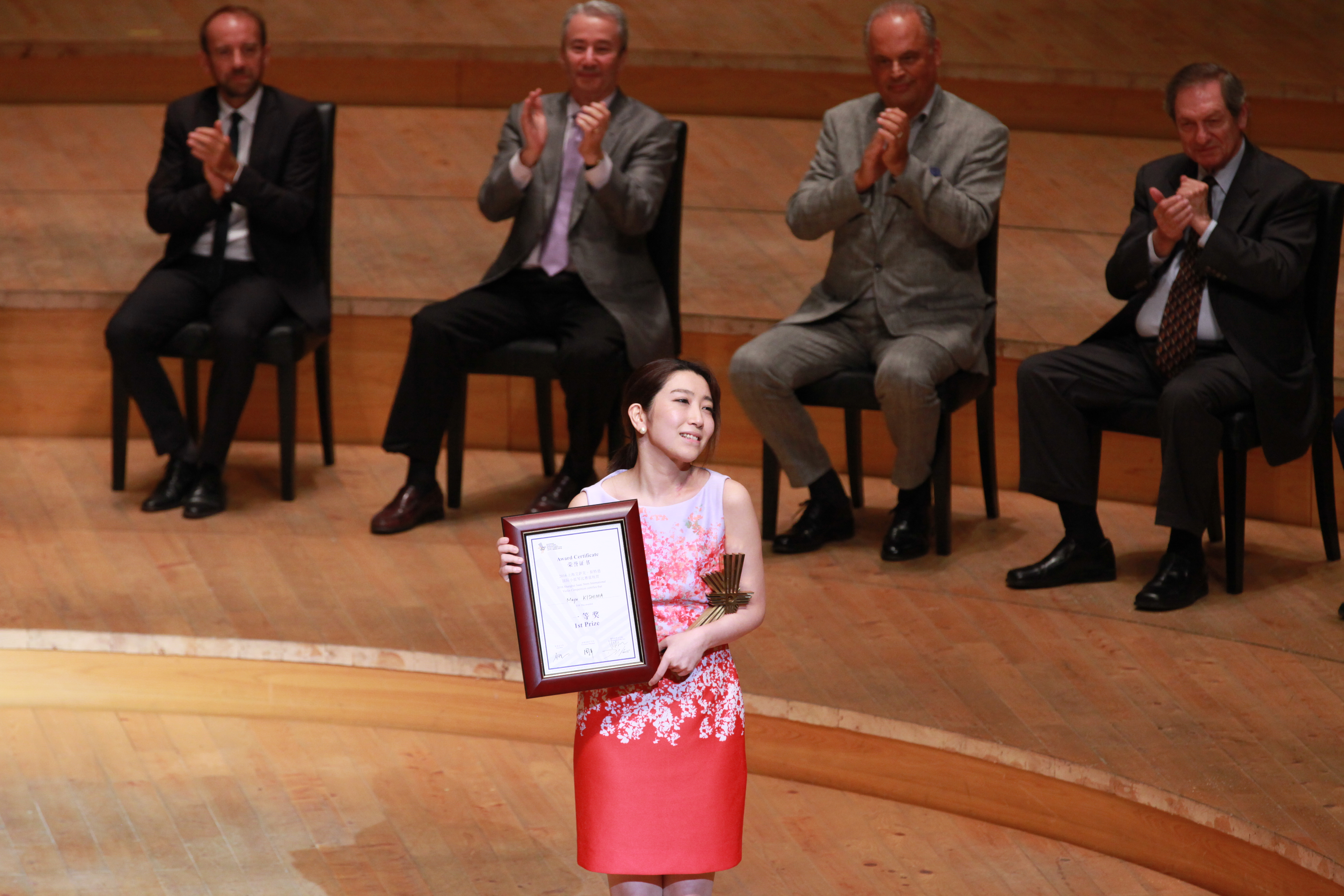
Violinist Mayu Kishima after winning first place at the inaugural Shanghai Isaac Stern International Violin Competition

The inaugural SISIVC took place in Shanghai Symphony Hall over the course of 25 sessions from August 14 to September 2, 2016. Co-chairs of the 13-member jury were David Stern and Vera Tsu Weiling and jury members included violin virtuoso Maxim Vengerov, Augustin Dumay, well-known pedagogue Zakhar Bron, and Boris Kuschnir among others. The final round which included concertos played with the Shanghai Symphony Orchestra, was conducted by Michael Stern. In keeping with Isaac Stern's values, all contestants were required to play a Chinese work, the iconic Butterfly Lovers' Violin Concerto. Only 24 competitors were invited to the competition from the 140 applications the competition received. The semi-finals of the competition was broadcast live internationally through LeTV Music while SMG broadcast the finals with on-site live commentary.

The first place prize was $100,000 in addition to performance contracts with several international orchestra, second place prize was $50,000, third place prize was $25,000, and fourth, fifth, and sixth prizes were $5,000 each. In addition, $10,000 was awarded for the best performance of the Chinese work and two Isaac Stern Human Spirit Awards were awarded for $10,000 each. The Isaac Stern Award is awarded to "an individual who is deemed to have made an outstanding contribution to our understanding of humanity through the medium of music." In 2016, one award was presented to Negin Khpalwak, an Afghan woman conductor who directs an orchestra for women in Afghanistan. The other award was presented to Wu Taoxiang and Du Zhengquan, who founded a middle-school ensemble in China called the Einstein Orchestra.

== 2018 competition ==
The second competition took place from August 8 to September 1, 2018. The required Chinese work for the competition was a co-commission by Shanghai Symphony Orchestra, Beijing Music Festival, Melbourne Symphony Orchestra, Orchestre national du Capitole de Toulouse, and New Jersey Symphony Orchestra, a violin concerto entitled La Joie de la Souffrance by Chinese composer Qigang Chen.

The $100,000 first prize was awarded to Nancy Zhou of the United States.

== 2020 competition ==
The third competition was set to take place from August 4 to 25, 2020. However, due to the COVID-19 pandemic, it was postponed to August 10 to 29, 2021. Despite the rescheduled dates, it retained "2020" in its name in commemoration of Isaac Stern's 100th birthday in 2020. The final round had tentatively been scheduled to take place live in Shanghai in August 2022, but in July 2022 the competition organizers announced that because of difficulties with international travel, the finals would be canceled and would be replaced with an online concert in August in which all six contestants would perform their final-round repertoire. The committee declared that the six finalists, Rino Yoshimoto of Japan; Thomas Lefort of France; Ruifeng Lin of China; Felicitas Schiffner of Germany; Angela Sin Ying Chan of Hong Kong, China; and Shannon Lee of the United States, would receive equal scholarship awards of $20,000.

== Winners ==
Year	1st place	2nd place	3rd place	4th place	5th place	6th Place	Best Chinese Work
2016	Mayu Kishima (Japan)	Sergei Dogadin (Russia)	Sirena Huang (United States)	Stefan Tarara (Germany)	Richard Lin (United States)	Ming Liu (China)	Ji Won Song (South Korea)
2018	Nancy Zhou (United States)	Olga Šroubková (Czech Republic)	Diana Tishchenko (Ukraine)	Jiayi Chen (China)	Chang Yuan Ting (Canada)	Yun Tang (China)	Olga Šroubková (Czech Republic)

2020: See section "2020 competition" above.

Year	Isaac Stern Human Spirit Award
2016	Negin Khpalwak (Afghanistan) and Taixiang Wu, Zhengquan Du (China)
2018	Kayhan Kalhor (Iran) and Xiaoshuijing Miao Farmers Choir (China)
