= Nancy Zhou =

Classical violinist (born 1993)

- Traditional Chinese: 周穎
- Simplified Chinese: 周颖
Transcriptions
Standard Mandarin
- Hanyu Pinyin: Zhōu Yǐng

Nancy Zhou (born January 5, 1993) is a Chinese-American classical violinist. She has performed as a soloist in recital and with orchestras throughout the world. Zhou has been a prizewinner in several major competitions, including first prizes in the 2018 Shanghai Isaac Stern International Violin Competition and the 2018 International Music Competition Harbin.

== Early life and musical training ==
Zhou was born in San Antonio, Texas. From her mother's side, she is of Bouyei descent, one of the 55 ethnic minorities in China. Zhou's mother was a member of a folk-dance group in Guiyang, China. Zhou began violin study at age four with her father, Long Zhou, who continued to be her teacher throughout her youth. She graduated from the Keystone School in San Antonio.

Zhou studied with Miriam Fried at the New England Conservatory and also took lessons from Paul Kantor and David Nadien. She graduated from Harvard University in 2017.

Zhou also acknowledges the mentorship of violinists Anne-Sophie Mutter and Weigang Li, as well as of Augustin Dumay, with whom she studied at the Queen Elisabeth Music Chapel in Waterloo, Belgium, where she earned an Artist Diploma and later held the title of Associate Artist.

== Competitions ==
Zhou received recognition at numerous competitions, including several top prizes:

- 2003 Kingsville (Texas) International Violin Competition, Director's Prize
- 2004 Pearl Amster Competition (Austin, Texas), Winner
- 2006 Pearl Amster Competition, Winner
- 2006 International Henryk Wieniawski Violin Competition (Poznań, Poland), Stage 2 (quarterfinalist)
- 2007 San Antonio Symphony Competition, Grand Prize
- 2009 Johansen International Competition, 1st prize and prize for best performance of commissioned work
- 2009 China International Violin Competition, 1st prize
- 2010 International Jean Sibelius Violin Competition (Helsinki, Finland), finalist and recipient of the Rastor special award for the best performance of Kaija Saariaho's Tocar
- 2011 International Tchaikovsky Competition, semifinalist
- 2012 Queen Elisabeth Competition, Laureate
- 2014 International Violin Competition of Indianapolis, semifinalist and winner of the top prize for Best Performance of Paganini Caprices
- 2015 International Joseph Joachim Violin Competition, Hannover, semifinalist
- 2015 International Jean Sibelius Violin Competition, finalist
- 2017 Isang Yun Competition, 2nd prize
- 2018 International Music Competition Harbin, 1st prize ($50,000)
- 2018 Shanghai Isaac Stern International Violin Competition, 1st prize ($100,000)

== Performing and teaching career ==
Zhou has performed as a soloist with the China National Symphony Orchestra, Hong Kong Philharmonic Orchestra, China Philharmonic Orchestra, Shanghai Symphony Orchestra, Saint Petersburg Philharmonic Orchestra, Munich Symphony Orchestra, Guangzhou Symphony Orchestra, Hanover State Symphony Orchestra, National Orchestra of Belgium, Hangzhou Philharmonic Orchestra, Armenian State Symphony Orchestra, Helsinki Philharmonic Orchestra, Finnish Radio Symphony Orchestra, Sichuan Symphony Orchestra, New Jersey Symphony, San Diego Symphony, San Antonio Symphony, Kansas City Symphony, Royal Stockholm Philharmonic Orchestra, Puerto Rico Symphony Orchestra, San Antonio Philharmonic, Orchestre Royal de Chambre de Wallonie, Guiyang Symphony Orchestra, Austin Symphony Orchestra, Jakarta Simfonia, La Jolla Symphony, Inner Mongolia Art Theater Symphony Orchestra, Orchestra da Camera di Perugia, Orchestra del Teatro Goldoni di Livorno (it), Tongyeong Festival Orchestra, Baden-Baden Philharmonic, New York Classical Players, Queens Symphony Orchestra, Oulu Symphony, Kalisz Philharmonic Symphony Orchestra, Central Ostrobothnian Chamber Orchestra, Kuopio Symphony Orchestra, Tapiola Sinfonietta, Kunming Nie'Er Symphony Orchestra, Tutan Festival Orchestra, and several other orchestras, and has performed recitals in the United States, Germany, Switzerland, Austria, China, Taiwan, Russia, Finland, Poland, Germany, South Korea, Armenia, Mexico, Spain, Portugal, Canada, and Belgium. She has collaborated with conductors Zhang Jiemin, Michael Stern, Christopher Seaman, Xian Zhang, Sakari Oramo, Jean-Jacques Kantorow, Sebastian Lang-Lessing, Ken-David Masur, Anna-Maria Helsing (sv), Atso Almila, Jurjen Hempel (nl), John Storgårds, Junping Qian, Hu Yongyan, Jaap van Zweden, Adam Klocek, Jaime Laredo, Peter Oundjian, Garrett Keast, Sergey Smbatyan, Gábor Hontvári (de), Eun Sun Kim, Christoph Poppen, Muhai Tang, Dongmin Kim, Lio Kuokman, Jeffrey Kahane, Sameer Patel, Kevin Field, Huang Yi, Yang Yang, Peter Bay, Rebecca Tong, François López-Ferrer, and Hannu Lintu.

From 2008 to 2018, she was sponsored by the Anne-Sophie Mutter Foundation, frequently collaborating with the German violinist on tours in Europe, Asia, and the U.S. and receiving scholarships generously endowed by the foundation.

From 2023 to 2026, Zhou was professor of violin on the faculty of the San Francisco Conservatory of Music, serving concurrently as artist in residence and concertmaster for the Santa Cruz Symphony. In September 2026, she began serving as professor of violin at the Tianjin Juilliard School in Tianjin, China.

== Discography ==
- Bach: Concerto for 2 Violins, Strings and Basso continuo, soloist for 3rd movement with Anne-Sophie Mutter. Anne-Sophie Mutter: The Club Album: Live from Yellow Lounge (2015). Deutsche Grammophon 479 5023. (Zhou performs as a member of Mutter's Virtuosi for other selections on the album.)
- STORIES (re)TRACED (2025 [recorded in 2024]). Works for solo violin by Ysaÿe, Bartók, Bach, and Kreisler. Orchid Classics ORC100379.
- Unsuk Chin: Gran Cadenza for Two Violins, with Anne-Sophie Mutter. East Meets West (2026). Alpha Classics ALPHA1244.
