= Negin Khpalwak =

Afghani female conductor (born 1997)

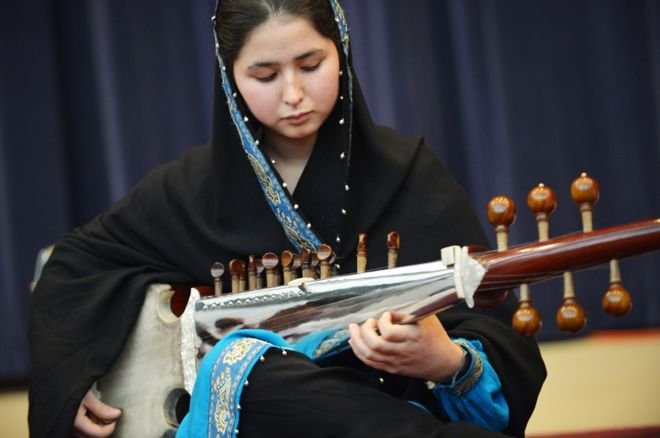
- Negin Khpalwak (2016)

Background information
- Born: 1997 (age 28–29); Kunar Province, Afghanistan

Negin Khpalwak (born in 1997 in Kunar, Afghanistan) is a female conductor leading the Zohra - the first all-female orchestra in Afghanistan from Afghanistan National Institute for Music. In February 2017, the orchestra played at the World Economic Forum in Davos, Switzerland.

== Early life ==
Born in Kunar, a province in northeastern Afghanistan, the young girl Negin Khpalwak showed strong passion for music. However, during the Taliban rule in Afghanistan, playing music was totally banned. Even later when the rule collapsed, many Muslims are conservative towards music, especially women playing music.

Being a girl in a Pashtun family, she could never share her passion with her family. Her first steps with music were in secret until she finally revealed it to her father. Not like other members in her family, he was supportive.

Negin was sent to an orphanage called the Afghan Child Education and Care Organization (AFCECO) in Kabul where she could get an education when she was nine. At the age of 13, she was selected for the Afghanistan National Institute for Music founded by the musicologist - Ahmad Naser Sarmast. The Institute has been running since 2010 with 141 students including 41 girls. Half of the students are street kids or orphans.

== Career ==
Negin lead an Afghan women's orchestra named Zohra, which is supposed to be the first all-female orchestra in the country. It was a part of the Afghanistan National Institute for Music (ANIM) and performed both Western and Afghan musical instruments.

In February, 2017, they performed for the first time outside Afghanistan at the World Economic Forum in Davos, Switzerland before their tour in Switzerland and Germany.

Dealing with threats, pressure and intimidation from her family members and people from her hometown when going public to perform music, Negin overcame and became Afghanistan's first female conductor. In an interview in Women and Girls of News Deeply, she emphasized that she hoped to further study music overseas and return to Afghanistan to create new orchestras.

Those plans were interrupted by the Taliban takeover of the government of Afghanistan. Khpalwak now lives in exile.
