= Polar Music Prize =

International music award

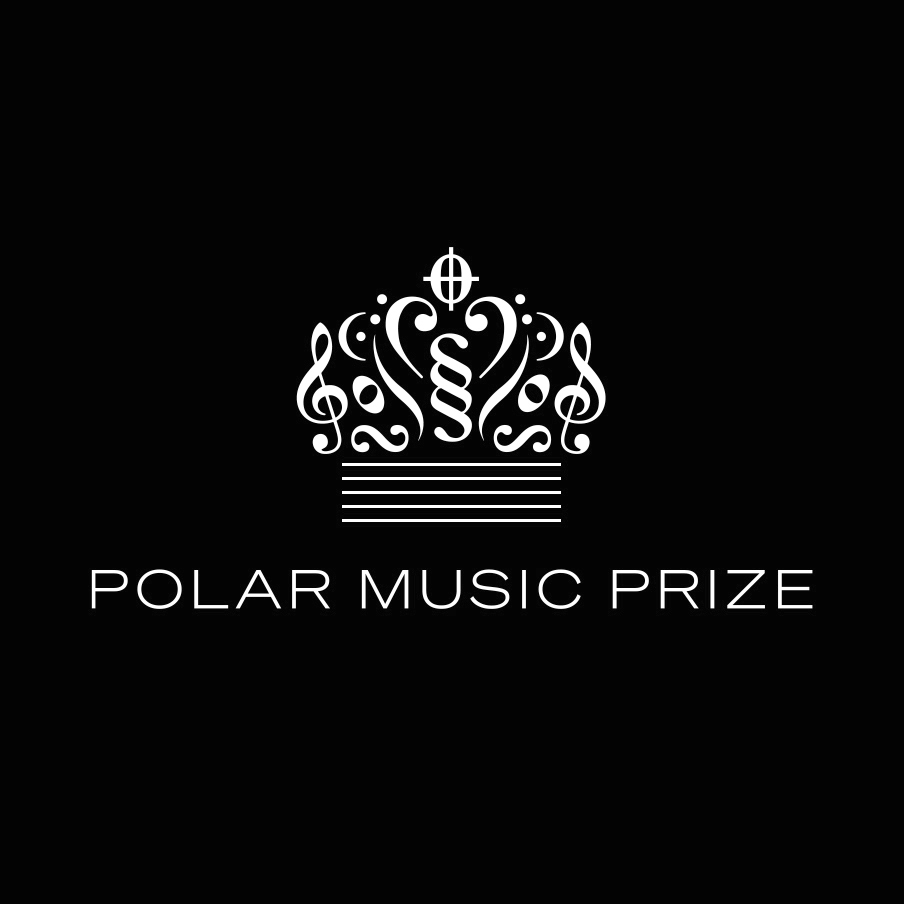
- Awarded for: International recognition of excellence in music
- Country: Sweden
- Presented by: Stig Anderson Music Award Foundation
- Reward: 1 million Swedish krona
- First award: 1992
- Website: polarmusicprize.org

The Polar Music Prize is a Swedish international award founded in 1989 by Stig Anderson, best known as the manager of the Swedish band ABBA, with a donation to the Royal Swedish Academy of Music. The award is annually given to one contemporary musician and one classical musician. Exceptions were made in 2001, when it was awarded to three musicians (one composer, one contemporary musician and one inventor), and 2003, when both prizes were awarded to the same person. Without any restrictions of nationality, the prize is to be "awarded for significant achievements in music and/or musical activity, or for achievements which are found to be of great potential importance for music or musical activity, and it shall be referable to all fields within or closely connected with music". The prize has been called the "Nobel Prize of Music" in Sweden.

The awards were first presented in 1992. The recipients were Sir Paul McCartney and the three Baltic States: Estonia, Latvia, and Lithuania. Each of these four Laureates were awarded 1 million kr (approximately US$120,000 at 2016 rates, US$106,000 in 2019, US$94,000 in 2024) presented by HM King Carl XVI Gustaf of Sweden at a ceremony at Stockholm Concert Hall in June every year. The Polar Music Prize is regarded as Sweden's foremost musical honour. The prize is overseen by the Stig Anderson Music Award Foundation, which includes members of Anderson's family and representatives of SKAP – the Swedish Society of Songwriters, Composers and Authors and the Swedish Performing Rights Society. A committee of musicians, other experienced members of the music industry, and members of Anderson's family selects the prize recipients from nominations submitted by representatives of several international music industry organizations, such as the European Composer and Songwriter Alliance. The prize amount is raised from revenue from the donation, while sponsors fund the ceremony. In June 2018, it was reported by Swedish public service radio that the Polar Prize organization had sustained large financial losses for several years.

== Laureates ==
Polar Music prize laureates
Year	Recipient	Nationality	Reason	Ref
1992	Paul McCartney	United Kingdom	"...for his creativity and imagination as a composer and artist which has revitalised popular music worldwide over the last 30 years."	
1992	Baltic states	the Baltic states (Estonia, Latvia, Lithuania)	"...to support their national music culture, as a nucleus for the formation of performing rights societies in international co-operation."	
1993	Dizzy Gillespie	United States	"...Closely familiar with the origins and roots of jazz, and perceiving its fertile development out of a variety of musical cultures, Dizzy Gillespie came on the scene, almost half a century ago, as a revolutionary innovator."	
1993	Witold Lutosławski	Poland	"...one of the pioneers of contemporary European art music."	
1994	Quincy Jones	United States	"...a boundary-transcending musical magician"	
1994	Nikolaus Harnoncourt	Austria	"...ranks today as a pioneer of the revival of interest, ... But he is also an independent ground-breaker who is constantly discovering new dimensions of the classics."	
1995	Elton John	United Kingdom	"...a central figure in the popular music crucible of the 70s and 80s and, eventually, an eccentric mega-star with a big output of successful hits with a worldwide response from a broadbased public."	
1995	Mstislav Rostropovich	Russia	"...for a unique artistic achievement distinguished by originality, independence, fluency and vigour of interpretation and instrumental mastery."	
1996	Joni Mitchell	Canada	"...In a long career of prolific and many-sided artistry, she has combined the roles of composer, lyric writer, vocal artist and musician with an impressive array of 'first instruments'."	
1996	Pierre Boulez	France	"...His profound musicality, clear intelligence and unusual farsightedness have enabled him to act in a wider field than the great majority. Thus he has occupied the forefront as composer, interpreter/conductor and eminent theorist, and he has made unique contributions as a debater and source of ideas."	
1997	Bruce Springsteen	United States	"...for an outstanding career as singer and stage performer."	
1997	Eric Ericson	Sweden	"...for pioneering achievements as a conductor, teacher, artistic originator and inspirer in Swedish and international choral music."	
1998	Ray Charles	United States	"...one of the leading figures of soul music and an important stylistic innovator with an unusual diversity of musical roots ... a man whose presence, ever since the 1950s, has been perceptible behind generations of innumerable pop musicians and singers."	
1998	Ravi Shankar	India	"...for nearly six decades of achievement as a brilliant performer and explorer of his country's art music and at the same time a leading representative and communicator to western civilisation of the musical traditions of the Orient."	
1999	Stevie Wonder	United States	"...for a unique career as a singer, composer and stage artist."	
1999	Iannis Xenakis	Greece	"...for a long succession of forceful works, charged with sensitivity, commitment and passion, ... exercising within its various fields an influence which cannot be readily overstated."	
2000	Bob Dylan	United States	"...his achievements encompass almost four decades of constantly changing modes of creativity, always innovative, but always based on American musical traditions and roots."	
2000	Isaac Stern	United States	"...for a unique and consummate artistry distinguished by a personal musicianship without compare for over half a century, for his pioneering achievement on behalf of young people the world over, for his patient and energetic commitment to preserving and developing places where music is played, and for his uncompromising attitude concerning the humanistic power of music."	
2001	Burt Bacharach	United States	"...Bacharach has been a principal player on the international music scene since his debut in the late 1950s, producing a host of timeless classics stemming from his infallible feeling for powerful, memorable and unmistakably personal melodies and for brilliantly designed harmony."	
2001	Robert Moog	United States	"...for his design of the MiniMoog, the first compact, easy-to-use synthesizer, which paved the way to the realm of electronic sounds that has revolutionised all genres of music during the past half-century."	
2001	Karlheinz Stockhausen	Germany	"...for a career as a composer that has been characterized by impeccable integrity and never-ceasing creativity, and for having stood at the forefront of musical development for fifty years."	
2002	Miriam Makeba	South Africa	"...Miriam Makeba embodied the concept of world music long before the term even existed on the musical map. In the 1960s, her expressive voice drew attention to the musical riches of the African continent."	
2002	Sofia Gubaidulina	Russia	"...whose intensely expressive and deeply personal musical idiom has the ability to speak to an ever-growing audience of listeners all over the world."	
2003	Keith Jarrett	United States	"...for his outstanding musical contributions in fields as diverse as classical interpretation and jazz improvisation."	
2004	B.B. King	United States	"...for his significant contributions to the blues."	
2004	György Ligeti	Hungary	"...for stretching the boundaries of the musically conceivable, from mind-expanding sounds to new astounding processes, in a thoroughly personal style that embodies both inquisitiveness and imagination."	
2005	Gilberto Gil	Brazil	"...for his unflinching creative engagement in bringing to the world the heart and soul of the rich music of Brazil."	
2005	Dietrich Fischer-Dieskau	Germany	"...for his unique artistry in every area of classical singing and for his unparalleled achievements as a penetrating and innovative interpreter of art songs in the German language."	
2006	Led Zeppelin	United Kingdom	"...one of the great pioneers of rock."	
2006	Valery Gergiev	Russia	"...for the way his unique, electrifying musical skills have deepened and renewed our relationship with the grand tradition; and for how he has managed to develop and amplify the importance of artistic music in these modern, changing times."	
2007	Sonny Rollins	United States	"...Sonny Rollins has elevated the unaccompanied solo to the highest artistic level – all characterised by a distinctive and powerful sound, irresistible swing and an individual musical sense of humour."	
2007	Steve Reich	United States	"...The award recognises his unique ability to use repeats, canon technique and minimal variation of patterns to develop an entire universe of evocative music, endowed with immediate tonal beauty."	
2008	Pink Floyd	United Kingdom	"...for their monumental contribution over the decades to the fusion of art and music in the development of popular culture."	
2008	Renée Fleming	United States	"...in recognition of her sublime unparalleled voice and unique stylistic versatility. [People] have been dazzled by the beauty of her soft and natural voice."	
2009	Peter Gabriel	United Kingdom	"...for his ground-breaking, outward-looking and boundary-busting artistry."	
2009	José Antonio Abreu & El Sistema	Venezuela	"... Abreu created the music network El Sistema, which has given hundreds of thousands the tools to leave poverty. José Antonio Abreu's successful creation has promoted traditional values, like respect, fellowship and humanity."	
2010	Björk	Iceland	"...With her deeply personal music and lyrics, her precise arrangements and her unique voice, Björk has already made an indelible mark on pop music and modern culture at large [...]."	
2010	Ennio Morricone	Italy	"...Ennio Morricone's congenial compositions and arrangements lift our existence to another plane, making the mundane feel like dramatic scenes in full Cinemascope."	
2011	Kronos Quartet	United States	"...For almost 40 years, the Kronos Quartet has been revolutionising the potential of the string quartet genre when it comes to both style and content."	
2011	Patti Smith	United States	"...Patti Smith has demonstrated how much rock'n'roll there is in poetry and how much poetry there is in rock'n'roll."	
2012	Paul Simon	United States	"...Nobody else is more deserving of the epithet of "world-class songwriter." For five decades, Paul Simon has built bridges not only over troubled waters but over entire oceans by (re)joining the world's continents with his music."	
2012	Yo-Yo Ma	United States	"...Yo-Yo Ma has dedicated his virtuosity and his heart to journeys of musical exploration and discovery around the world."	
2013	Youssou N'Dour	Senegal	"...Youssou N'Dour is maintaining the griot tradition and has shown that it can also be changed into a narrative about the entire world. ... His voice encompasses an entire continent's history and future, blood and love, dreams and power."	
2013	Kaija Saariaho	Finland	"...Kaija Saariaho combines acoustic instruments with electronics and computers. She has written chamber music, orchestral works and operas. Kaija Saariaho is a modern maestro who opens up our ears and causes their anvils and stirrups to fall in love."	
2014	Chuck Berry	United States	"...Chuck Berry was the rock'n'roll pioneer who turned the electric guitar into the main instrument of rock music."	
2014	Peter Sellars	United States	"...Peter Sellars shows us that classical music is not about dusty sheet music and metronomic precision, but that classical music, with its violent power and complexity, has fundamentally always been and will continue to be a way of reflecting and depicting the world."	
2015	Emmylou Harris	United States	"The music of Emmylou Harris contains the history and topography of the entire American continent."	
2015	Evelyn Glennie	United Kingdom	"Evelyn Glennie shows us that the body is a resonance chamber and that we live in a universe of sound."	
2016	Max Martin	Sweden	"In the last 20 years, no composer in the world has written melodies as sustainable or as widespread as those of Max Martin"	
2016	Cecilia Bartoli	Italy	"Cecilia Bartoli adds new chapters to the history of music, builds bridges between centuries and deepens our understanding of Europe's cultural heritage"	
2017	Sting	United Kingdom	"As a composer, Sting has combined classic pop with virtuoso musicianship and an openness to all genres and sounds from around the world."	
2017	Wayne Shorter	United States	"[...]he has written a number of the most enduring compositions in the history of jazz. Without the musical explorations of Wayne Shorter, modern music would not have drilled so deep."	
2018	Afghanistan National Institute of Music and Ahmad Sarmast	Afghanistan	"...in recognition of how this inspirational organisation has used the power of music to transform young people's lives."	
2018	Metallica	United States	"Not since Wagner's emotional turmoil and Tchaikovsky's cannons has anyone created music that is so physical and furious, and yet still so accessible."	
2019	Grandmaster Flash	United States	"Grandmaster Flash is a scientist and a virtuoso who has demonstrated that turntables and mixing consoles can be musical instruments. His adventures at the turntables – "the Adventures of the Wheels of Steel" – changed the course of popular music."	
2019	Anne-Sophie Mutter	Germany	"With her Stradivarius under her chin, Anne-Sophie Mutter is not just one passionate and risk-taking musician – she is also a storyteller. As she herself said, "Music is only touching when it tells a story". With her passionate commitment to justice, Mutter demonstrates the power and key role of music in the world."	
2019	Playing for Change	United States	"...a global project with 15 music schools and programs around the world that have impacted the lives of over 15,000 children and their surrounding communities. The Playing For Change Foundation shows how music can be used to inspire, build bridges between people, create positive change, and conditions for peace."	
2020	Anna Netrebko	Russia, Austria	"With her magnificent voice and glowing charisma, she is a larger-than-life singer who keeps the classics alive, sells out every performance and also catches the attention of audiences new to opera; Anna Netrebko opens doors. She was the first classical musician to be included in Time Magazine's 'The Top 100 Most Influential People'."	
2020	Diane Warren	United States	"Her pop songs embody the rare combination of being catchy and yet complex enough to be heard hundreds of times, and still resonate with the listener. Diane Warren is the founder of Realsongs, the most successful female-owned music publisher in the world. As a singer, to be given a Diane Warren song, is a gift."	
2021	Cancelled due to the COVID-19 pandemic			
2022	Iggy Pop	United States	"With his era-defining group The Stooges, Iggy Pop created furious rock music by blending together blues and free jazz influences with the roar of the Michigan automotive industry. With his courage, initiative and raw power, Iggy Pop paved the way for punk and post-punk. Groups like the Sex Pistols, Ramones, Blondie, Siouxsie and the Banshees, Joy Division and Nick Cave all followed in his footsteps. As a solo artist, Iggy Pop has never slowed down, and has instead pushed this art form forwards for half a century. Iggy Pop is 'the chairman of the bored' who portrays alienation in poetic language. A wholly unique artist who personifies and embodies what rock music is about."	
2022	Ensemble intercontemporain	France	"Ensemble intercontemporain is the Stradivarius of modern music and has inspired the greatest composers of our time to create new masterpieces since the 1970s. Thanks to its openness to new technology and collaborating with other art forms, this groundbreaking ensemble has been enormously important for pushing progress. Ensemble intercontemporain, under the guidance of music director Matthias Pintscher, is made up of 31 soloists and has a repertoire that now includes over 3,000 modern pieces. Thanks to its focus on creativity, innovation and high quality, as well as focusing on engaging with young musicians, the ensemble has helped to advance the entire world of music."	
2023	Chris Blackwell	United Kingdom	"As a record producer and genuine music lover, Chris Blackwell has been one of the key figures in the development of popular music for half a century"	
2023	Angélique Kidjo	Benin	"A unique and unstoppable artist and songwriter. Angélique Kidjo speaks and sings in five languages: Fon, French, Yorùbá, Goun and English"	
2023	Arvo Pärt	Estonia	"Composer Arvo Pärt has likened his music to white light. It is in the encounter with the prism of the listener's soul that all colors become visible. Anyone who has heard his laconic, reduced compositions will understand this perfectly."	
2024	Nile Rodgers	United States	"Dance music has been played for thousands of years. However, there are few in history, if any, who have composed dance music as sophisticated and subtly arranged as Nile Rodgers. It is fitting that his group was named Chic: elegance is part of his musical hallmark. As a composer, producer and guitarist, Nile Rodgers turned disco and funk into an art form. His chop chord style of guitar playing, which he calls chucking, creates a hypnotic swing that has kept millions grooving on the dance floor. The songs created by Nile Rodgers for Chic, Sister Sledge, Diana Ross, David Bowie, Madonna, Daft Punk and many others are so well-crafted that they will outlive us all."	
2024	Esa-Pekka Salonen	Finland	"His breakthrough came in 1983 when he conducted Mahler's Symphony No. 3. As a composer, Esa-Pekka shares many similarities with Gustav Mahler. They have been equally prominent both as conductors and composers, and characterised by the same artistic curiosity. On stage and in the studio, Esa-Pekka Salonen embraces technological innovations, not simply for the sake of experimentation, but as a way to help people discover great music in the constantly changing world of media. Esa-Pekka Salonen is a master of tone in soul and heart. With his resolute baton, he not only guides symphony orchestras but points the way for all classical music."	
2025	Barbara Hannigan	Canada	"Her exceptional musicality and courage make her one of the world's foremost interpreters of contemporary classical music. She has worked with and earned the praise of former Polar Prize Laureates such as Pierre Boulez, György Ligeti and Esa-Pekka Salonen, as well as an array of the world's most eminent directors, conductors, orchestras, composers and choreographers. Always prepared to push the boundaries, she has a unique talent for broadening the listener's horizons with the music she chooses to program, perform and record. While Barbara Hannigan built her career as a magnetic soprano, her intense musicianship and charisma eventually led to invitations to try her hand at orchestral conducting. Since then, she has become an acclaimed maestro who is admired for combining old and new music in her unique concert programs. Whenever she conducts and sings at the same time, it is an experience no one forgets. It's little wonder that the name at the top of the wish list of so many composers, is Barbara Hannigan."	
2025	Herbie Hancock	United States	"The title of his autobiography Possibilities is fitting for a musician who has always focused on musical development and finding new ways of moving forward. While growing up Herbie Hancock was influenced by Mozart as much as Oscar Peterson. At college he studied both electrical engineering and musical composition. As a musician, he united these worlds by making the leap to electric piano and synthesizers. As a composer, he has written timeless standards such as Watermelon Man and Cantaloupe Island, and for decades has worked closely with Polar Music Prize Laureates Joni Mitchell and Wayne Shorter. As a musician, he has influenced the development of R&B, funk and hip-hop with visionary albums such as Head Hunters and the MTV hit Rockit. Herbie Hancock is a jazz scientist."	
2025	Queen	United Kingdom	"With the foundation in hard rock, Queen have developed a distinctive and instantly recognizable sound that no one else can emulate. Furious energy and muscular playing are combined with intricate virtuoso harmony singing from drummer Roger Taylor, guitarist Brian May and, of course, singer Freddie Mercury, one of the most charismatic front figures in the history of music. What helped to make Queen a unique band in music history was four equally strong songwriters, including bassist John Deacon, who all wrote their own number one hits, and constantly spurred each other on to take artistic risks. Half a century after they made their recordings, Queen's songs are still heard everywhere and appeal to new generations of listeners."	

== Gallery ==
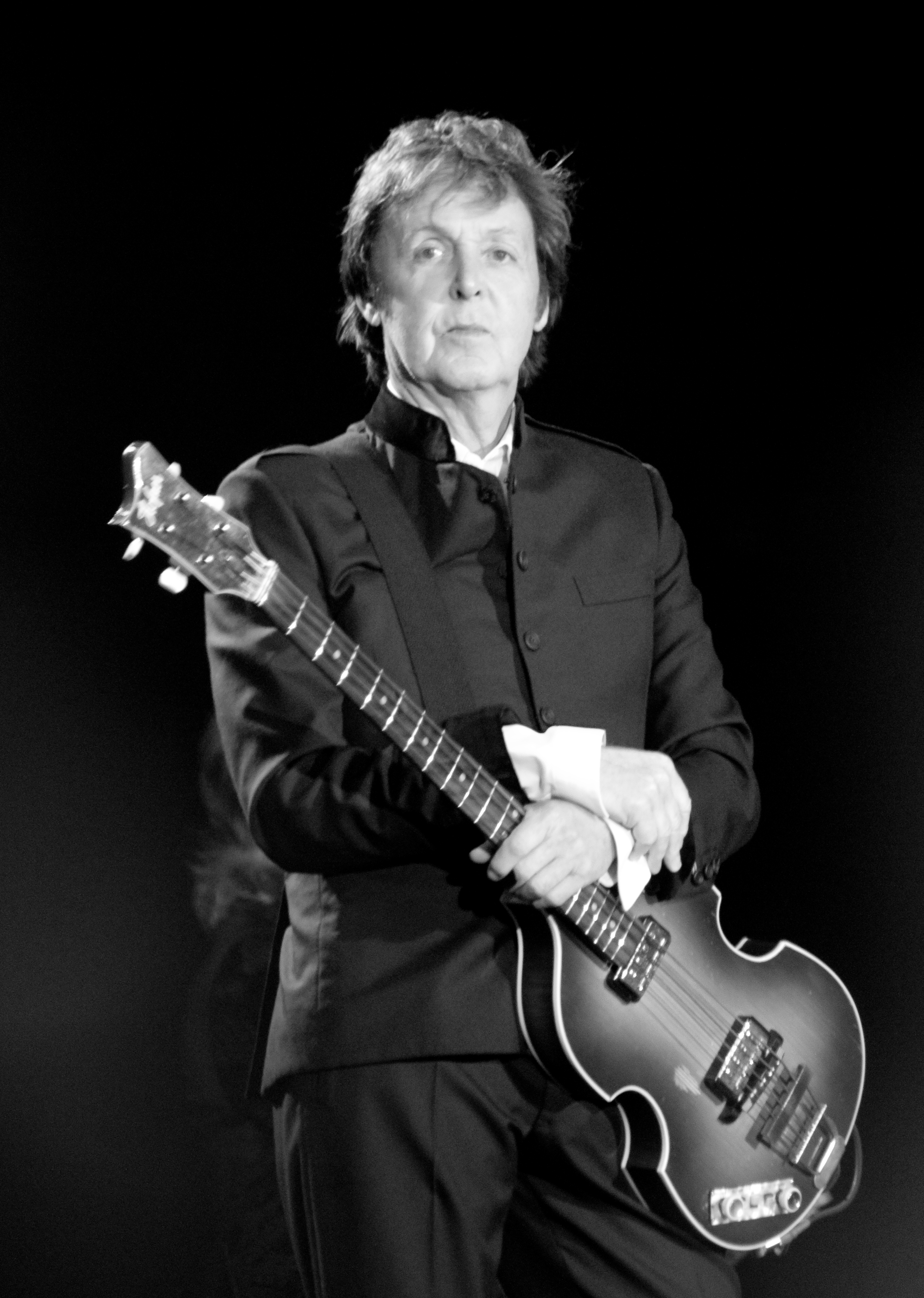
Paul McCartney was the first winner in 1992 and one of two people (the other being Chuck Berry) who didn't receive the award in person.

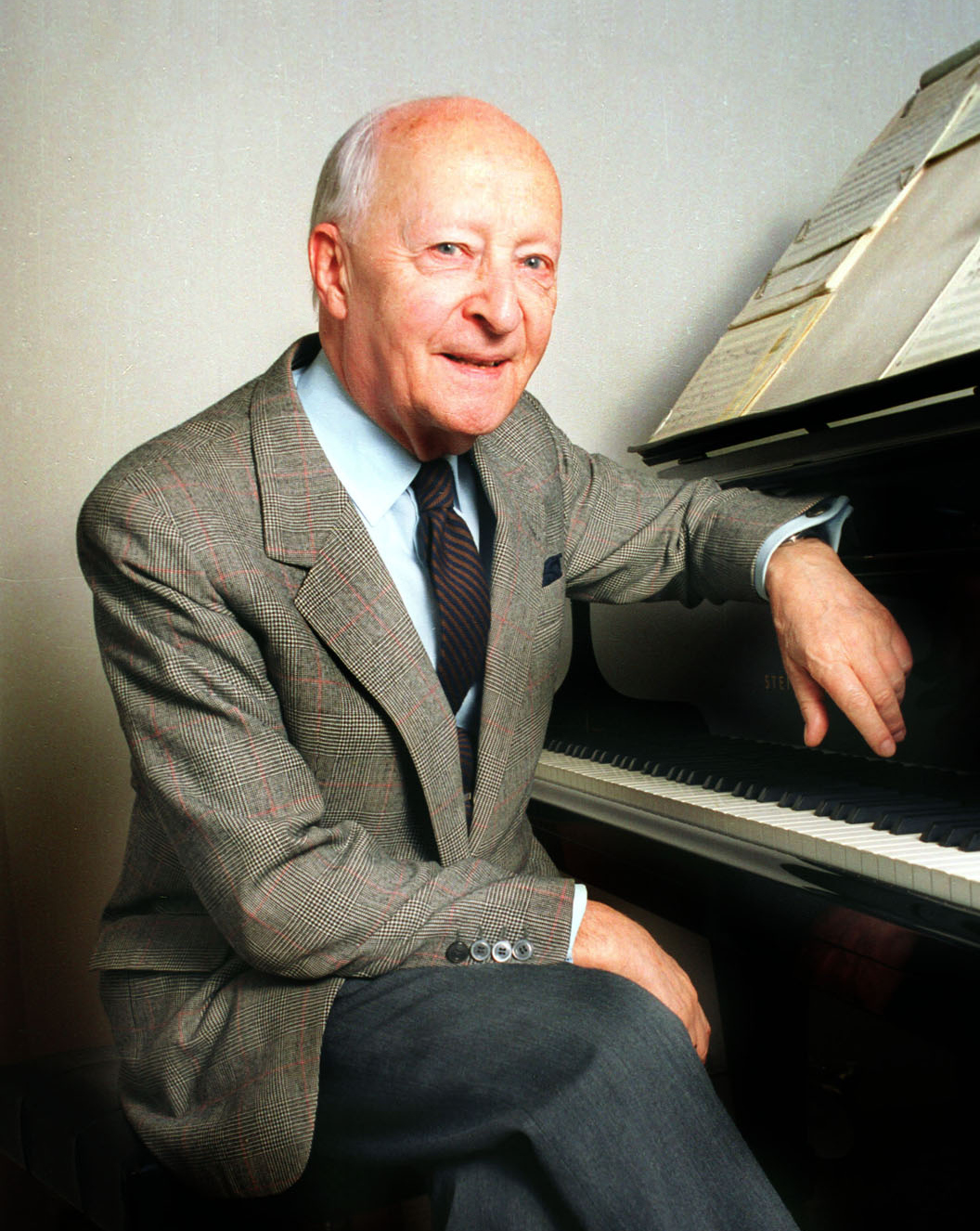
Witold Lutosławski was the first classical musician to win the award in 1993.

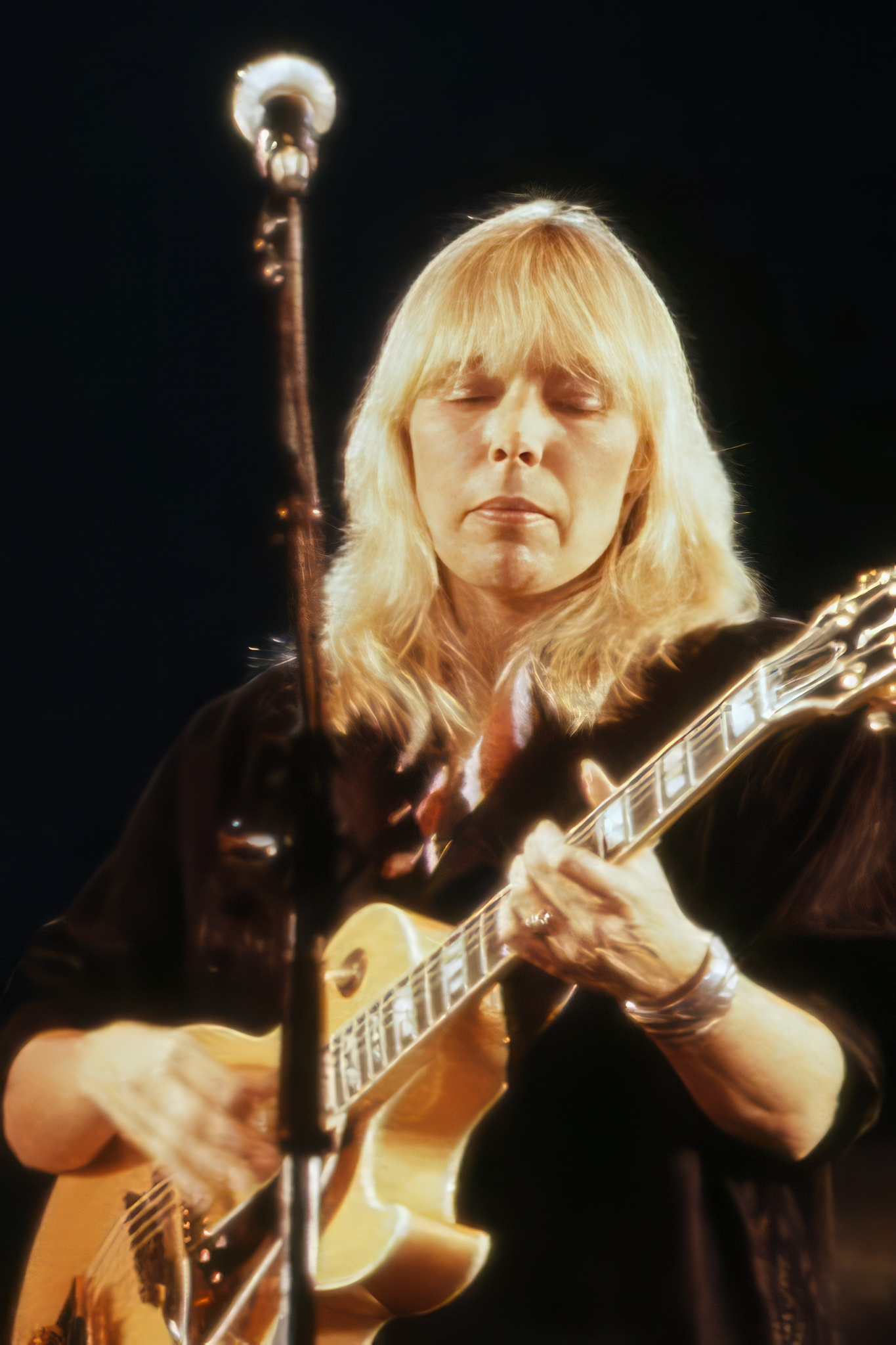
Joni Mitchell was the first female award recipient in 1996.

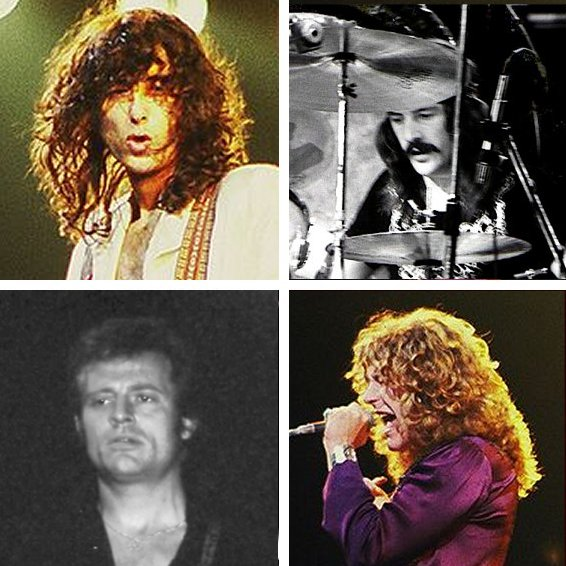
The English band Led Zeppelin became the first musical group to win the award in 2006.

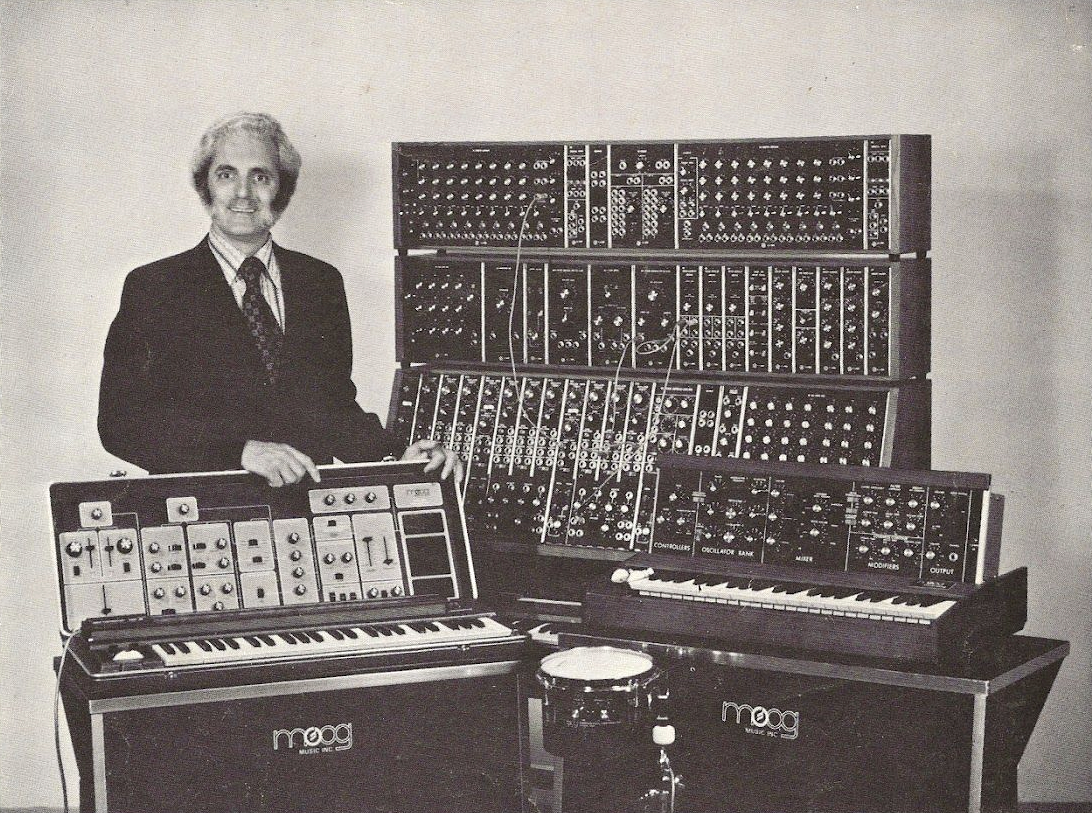
Robert Moog became the first inventor to win the award for the synthesizer MiniMoog in 2001.

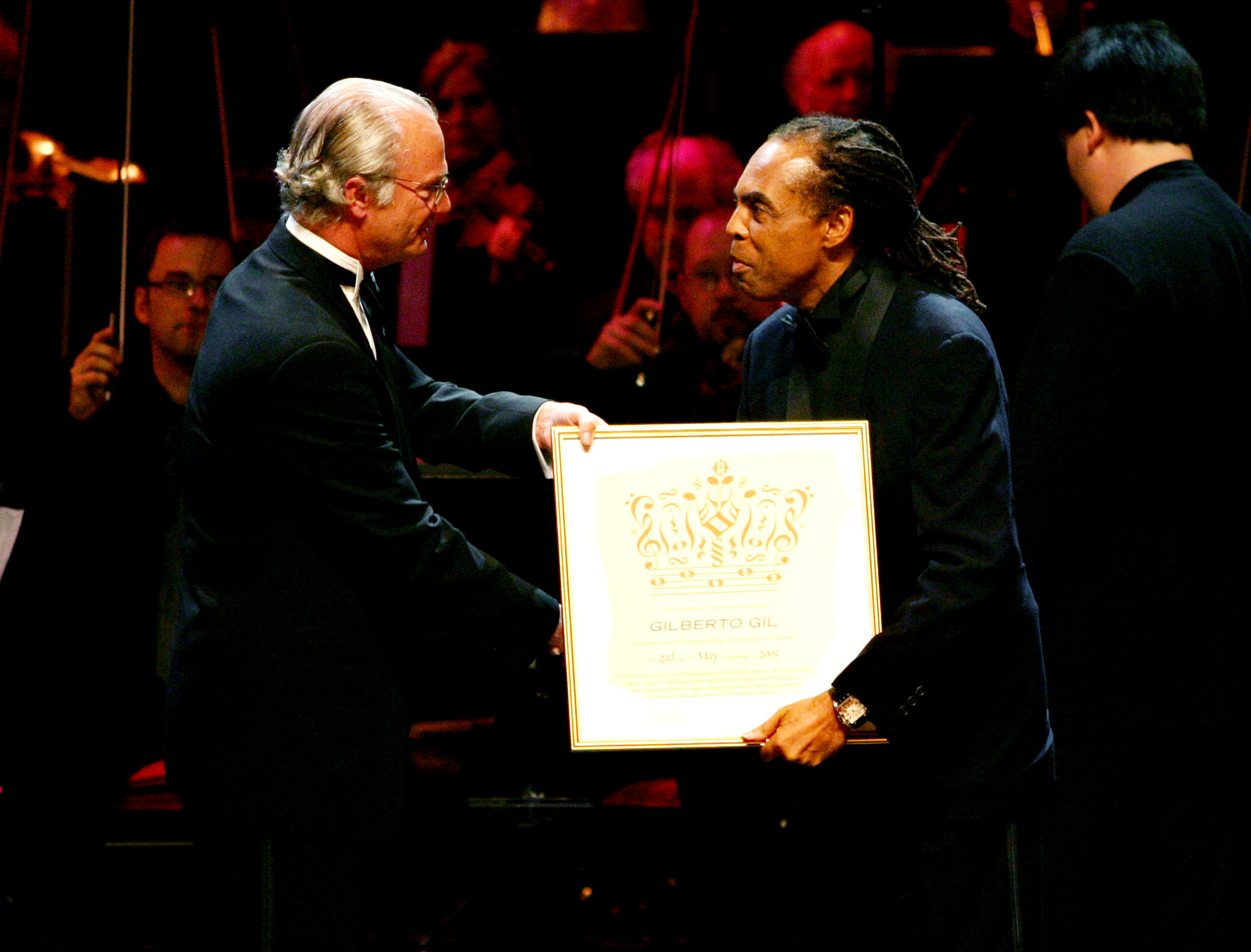
Gilberto Gil – the winner in the contemporary category in 2005, receives the prize from King Carl XVI Gustaf of Sweden

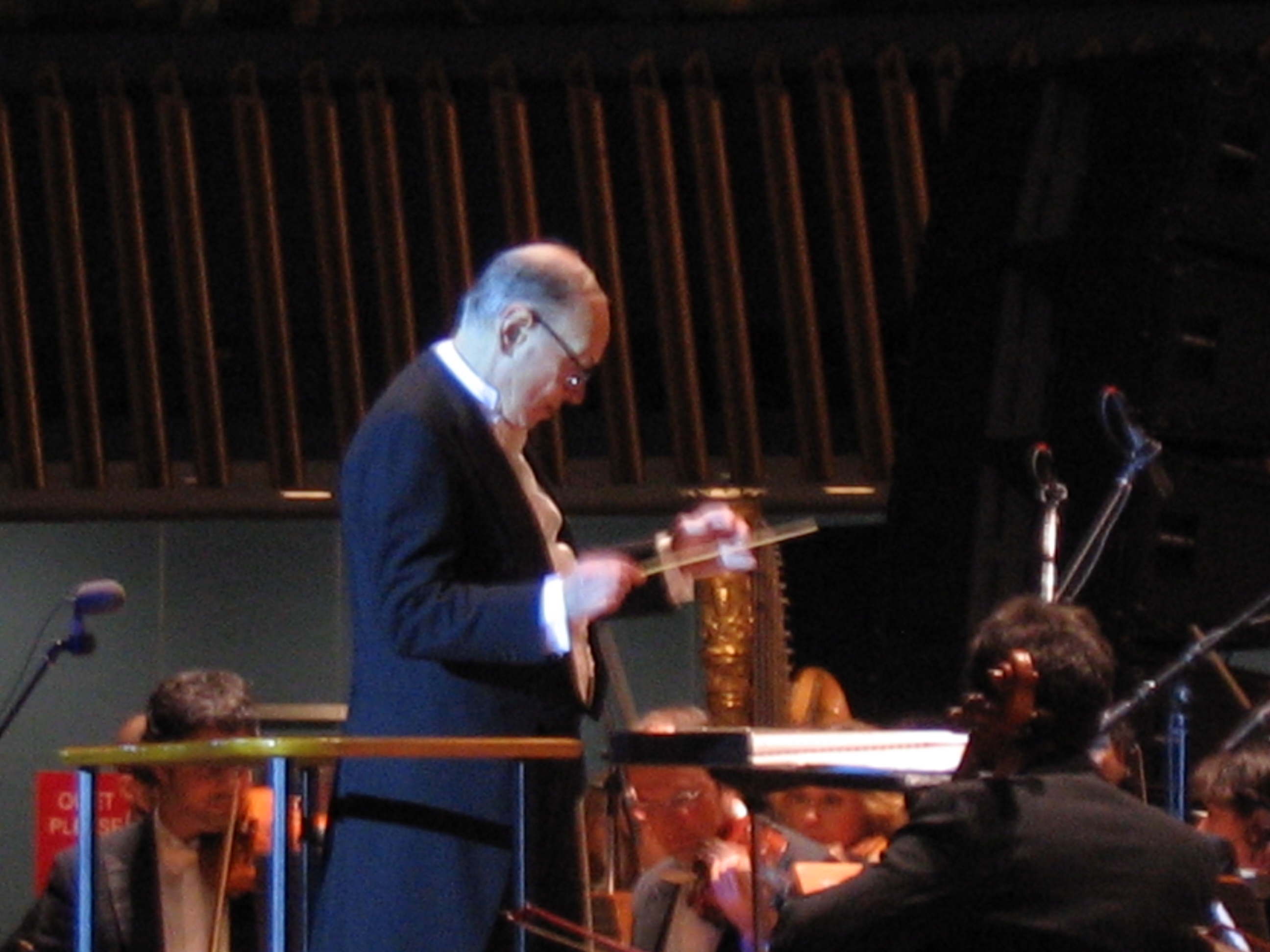
Ennio Morricone – the only film composer who has won the award, 2010

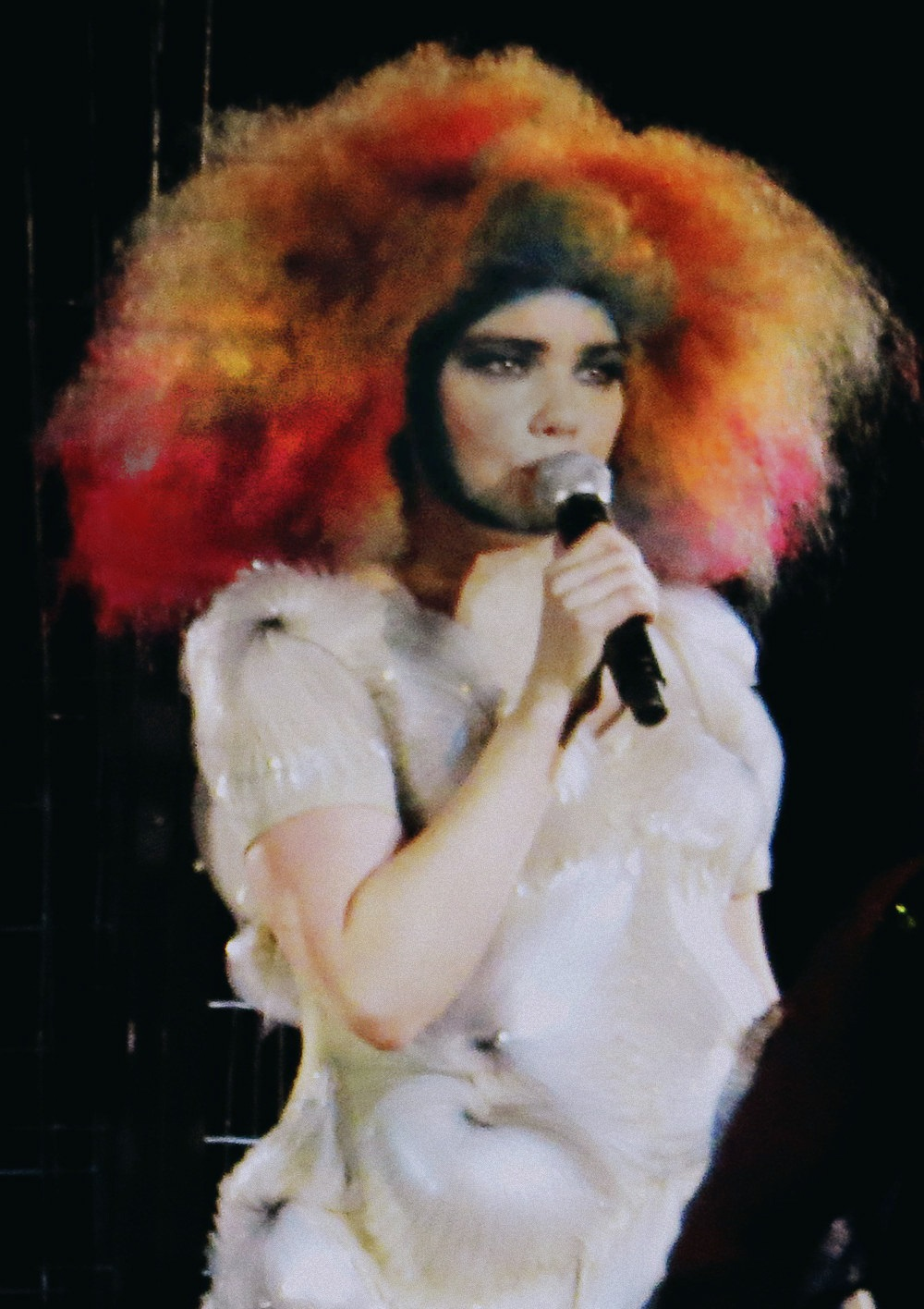
Björk – the winner in the contemporary category in 2010

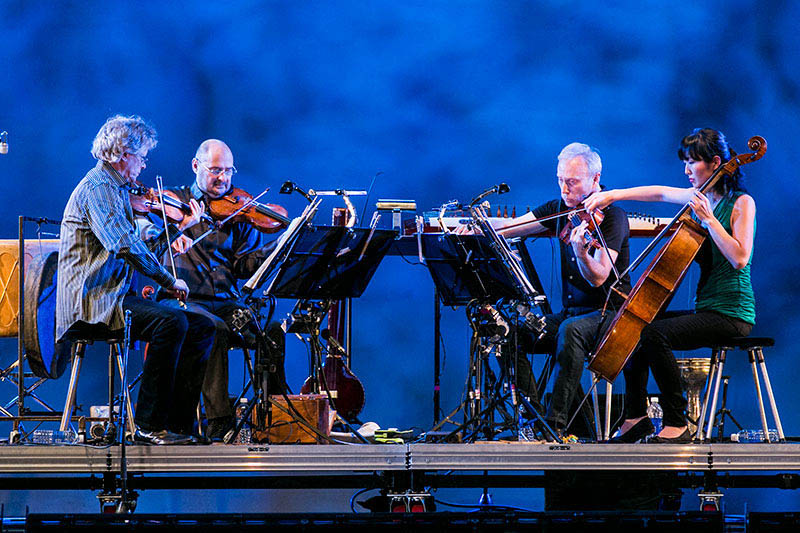
Kronos Quartet – winners in the classical category in 2011

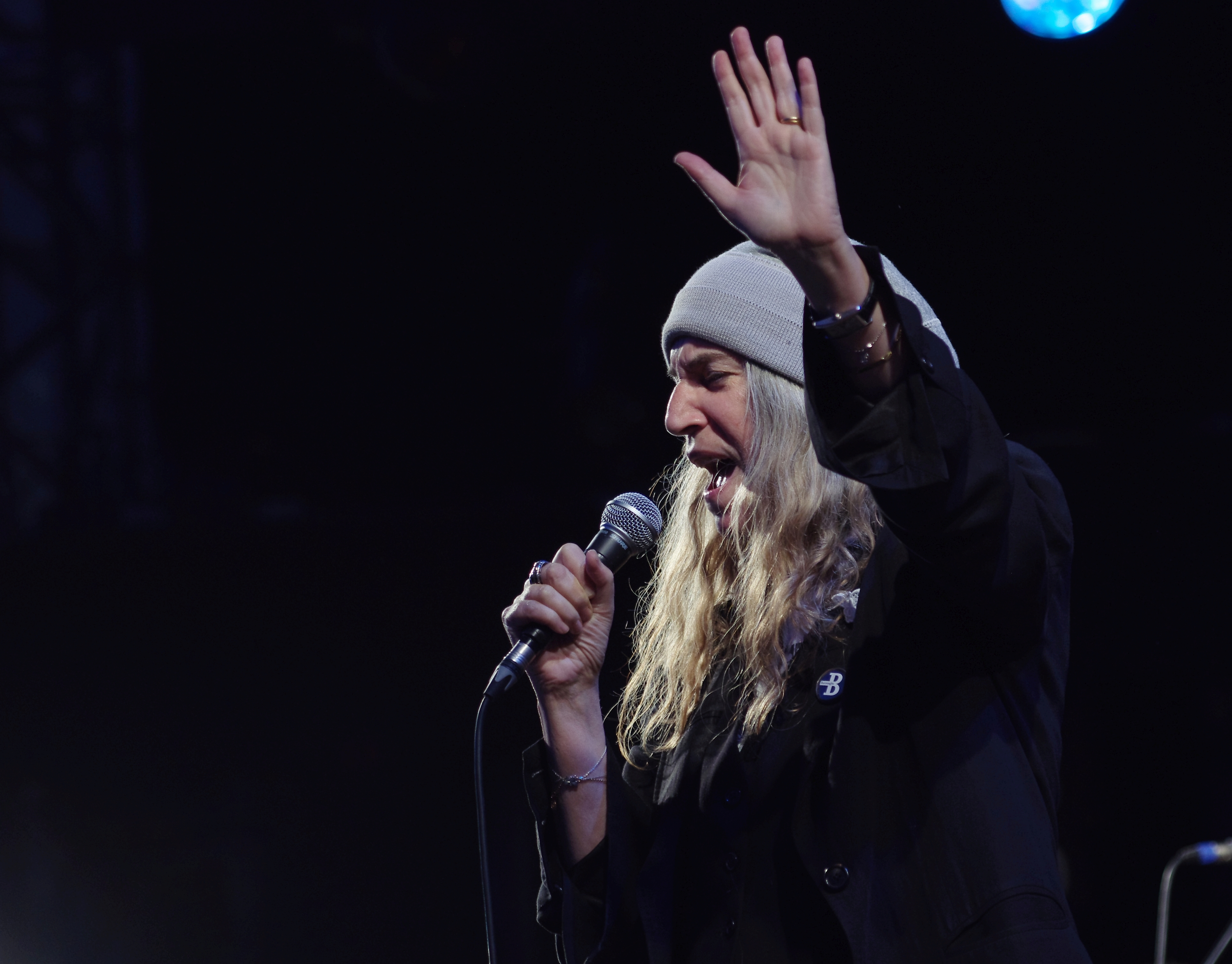
Patti Smith – the winner in the contemporary category in 2011

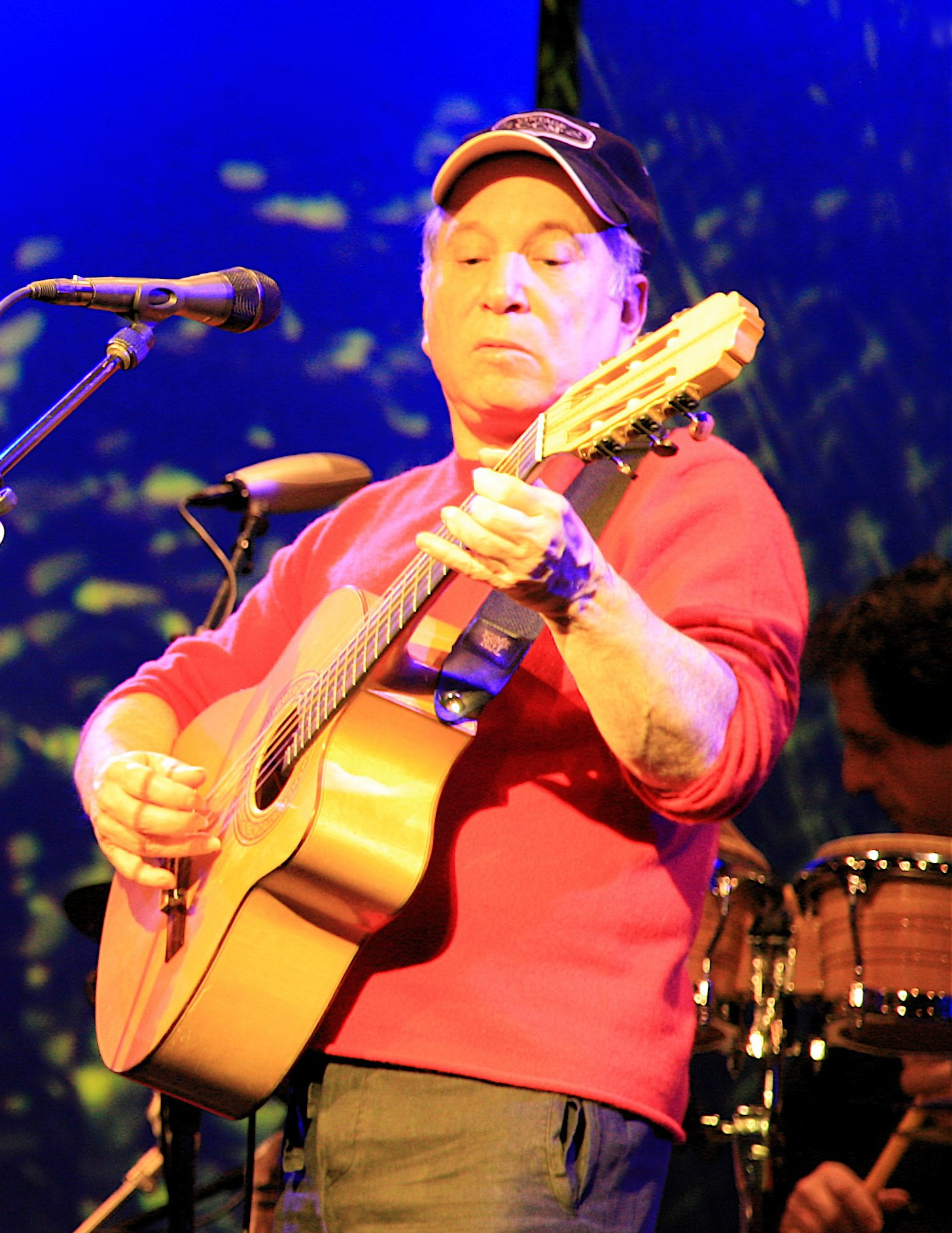
Paul Simon – the winner in the contemporary category in 2012

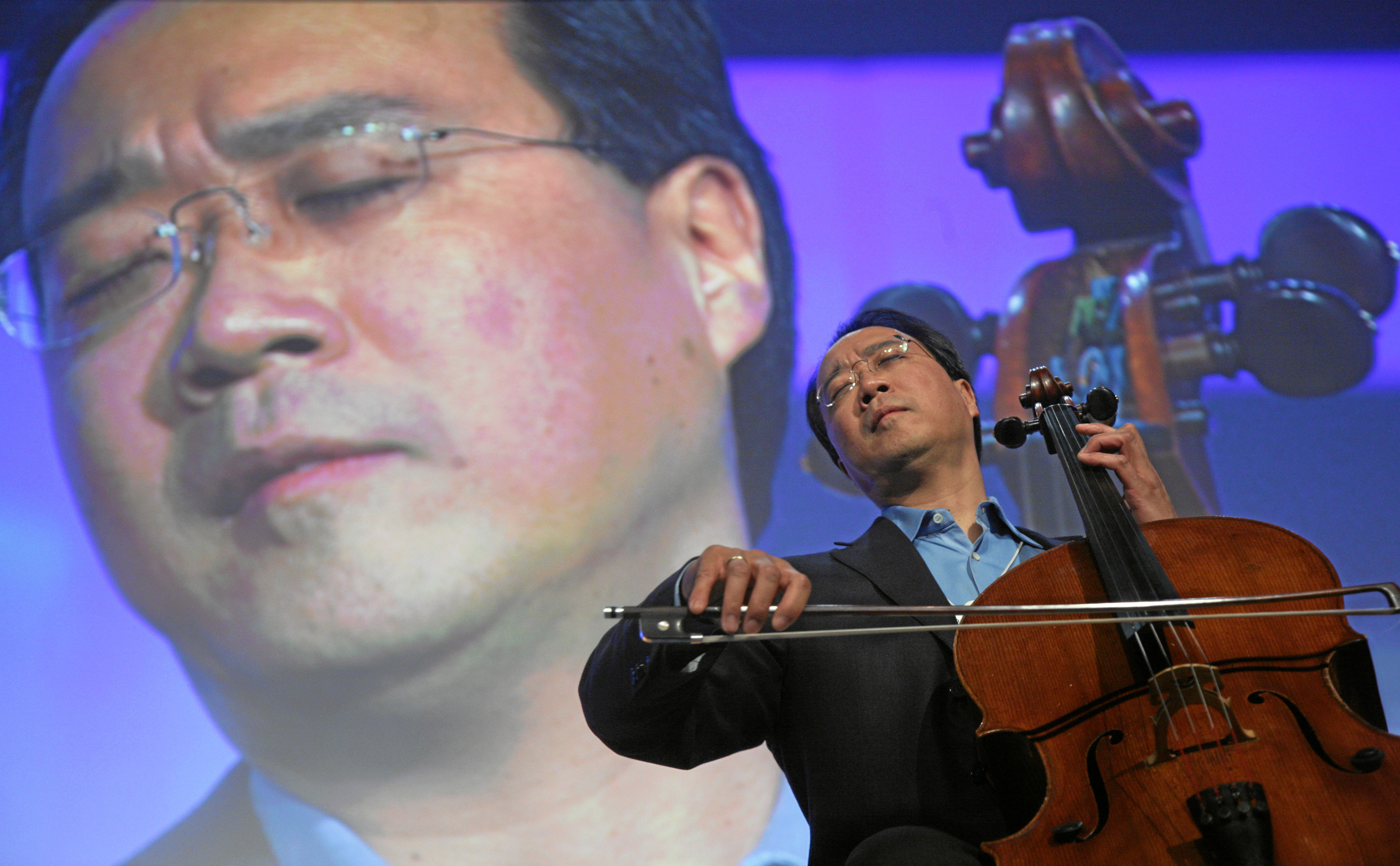
Yo-Yo Ma – the winner in the classical category in 2012
