= 2010 International Jean Sibelius Violin Competition =

The Tenth International Jean Sibelius Violin Competition took place in Helsinki from November 21 to 2 December 2010. It was won by Russian violinist Nikita Borisoglebsky, while Petteri Iivonen and Esther Yoo earned the 2nd and 3rd prizes.

== Jurors ==
- (Finland) Jukka-Pekka Saraste (chairman)
- (South Korea) Ik-Hwan Bae
- (France) Olivier Charlier
- (Italy) Ana Chumachenco
- (Finland) Jaakko Kuusisto
- (South Korea) Sung-ju Lee
- (Russia) Igor Oistrakh
- (Norway) Arve Tellefsen
- (Finland) Jari Valo

== Results ==
Contestant	R1	SF	F
(Latvia) Kristine Balanas			
(Russia) Andrey Baranov			
(France) Jérôme Benhaim			
(Russia) Nikita Borisoglebsky			Gold medal
(Germany) Sebastian Casleanu			
(Taiwan) Yu-ting Chen			
(Canada) Ewald Cheung			
(South Korea) Jinjoo Cho			
(Russia) Sergey Dogadin			
(Japan) Yuichiro Fukuda			
(United States) Emilie-Anne Gendron			
(Russia) Liana Gourdjia			
(Australia) Danny Gu			
(South Korea) Soojin Han			
(Norway) Miriam Helms Ålien			
(Finland) Petteri Iivonen			Silver medal
(Slovakia) Dalibor Karvay			
(United States) Eunice Keem			
(South Korea) Bomsori Kim			
(South Korea) Hye-jin Kim			
(South Korea) Jee-won Kim			
(United States) Stephen Kim			
(South Korea) Young-ok Kim			
(Japan) Yu Kurokawa			
(South Korea) Hyuk-joo Kwun			
(France) Anne-Sophie Le Rol			
(Russia) Chingiz Osmanov			
(South Korea) Ji-yoon Park			
(China) Jing Qiao			
(United States) Brendan Shea			
(Finland) Sini Simonen			
(Denmark) Philippe Skow			
(United States) Emma Steele			
(United States) Elly Suh			
(Japan) Eimi Wakui			
(United States) Esther Yoo			Bronze medal
(Latvia) Laura Zariņa			
(United States) Nancy Zhou			
