= Lucia Kašová =

Slovak documentary filmmaker (born 1983)

- Born: 16 October 1983 (age 42); Bratislava, Czechoslovakia
- Education: Academy of Performing Arts in Bratislava; National Film and Television School; Valencia Polytechnic University
- Occupations: Documentary filmmaker, director, screenwriter
- Years active: 2010s–present

Lucia Kašová (born 16 October 1983) is a Slovak documentary filmmaker, director and screenwriter. Her work focuses on questions of freedom, equality, social issues and character-driven stories. Her most notable films include The Sailor (2021), her feature-length documentary debut, and Orchestra from the Land of Silence (2020), a documentary about Afghanistan's all-female Zohra Orchestra. Both films were screened at international film festivals and received international recognition.

== Early life and education ==
Kašová was born in Bratislava, Czechoslovakia, on 16 October 1983. She studied documentary directing at the Academy of Performing Arts in Bratislava (VŠMU) in Slovakia. She has also studied at the National Film and Television School in the United Kingdom and at Technical University of Valencia in Spain. She has participated in documentary development and training programmes including Doc.Incubator, MFI Script 4 Film and East Doc Forum.

== Career ==
Kašová's early work included short documentary and experimental films. Her 2018 film Concrete Times is a documentary city essay about Bratislava and the changing landscape along the Danube. The film was selected for international film festivals and received several awards.

Her short documentary Orchestra from the Land of Silence (2020) focuses on an all-female Zohra Orchestra in Afghanistan and the experiences of young women studying music in Kabul. The film was screened at numerous international festivals and received international recognition.

Kašová has also worked on television documentary projects, including the series Ex-Prime Ministers, where she interviewed Robert Fico, who was a former prime minister at the time and later returned to the office. She has collaborated with the Slovak music festival Pohoda on documentary projects.

== The Sailor ==
Kašová's feature-length documentary debut, The Sailor, was released in 2021. She directed the film and wrote its story and screenplay. The film follows Paul Johnson, an elderly sailor living on his boat in the Caribbean, as he reflects on freedom, ageing and his unconventional way of life.

The Sailor had its world premiere at the Hot Docs Canadian International Documentary Festival in Toronto in 2021, where it was presented in the World Showcase programme.

The film won the Grand Prize for Best Feature Documentary at the 2021 Flickers' Rhode Island International Film Festival.

== Later work ==
Kašová is one of three directors of the documentary Wasteland Chronicles (Zóny nikoho), together with Viera Čákanyová and Barbora Sliepková. She is also credited as a co-author of the story and screenplay. The film examines environmental contamination and ecological damage at several locations in Slovakia.

Kašová is the director and screenwriter of World of Walls, an international creative documentary set against a near-future backdrop of extreme social inequality and climate crisis. The project was presented at international documentary industry forums and won the Pitch the Doc Prize at East Doc Platform in 2023.

== Filmography ==
Year	Title	Role
2017	Mama. Gabriel. Television	Director, writer
2017	43 Years of Bratislava Metro	Director, writer
2018	Concrete Times	Director, writer
2019	Ex-Prime Ministers: Robert Fico	Director
2020	Orchestra from the Land of Silence	Director
2021	The Sailor	Director, writer
2023	Power	Cast
2026	Wasteland Chronicles (Zóny nikoho)	Director, story, screenplay
2027	World of Walls	Director, screenwriter

The filmography is primarily based on the Slovak Film Institute (SFÚ), ČSFD, IDF and IMDB with additional sources used to verify individual works and credits.
