= Ahmad Naser Sarmast =

- Born: Afghanistan
- Citizenship: Australian
- Education: Monash University; Moscow State Conservatory
- Occupation: Ethnomusicologist
- Parent: Ustad Salim Sarmast
- Awards: International Music Council Musical Rights Award; Radio Azadi Person of the Year (2013); David Chow Humanitarian Award; Government of Afghanistan Education Award
- Website: www.afghanistannationalinstituteofmusic.org/founder

Ahmad Naser Sarmast is an Afghan-Australian ethnomusicologist. He is the founder and director of the Afghanistan National Institute of Music.

== Early life and education ==
Ahmad Sarmast's father, Ustad Salim Sarmast, was a famous musician, composer and conductor in Afghanistan, and the young Sarmast grew up exposed to a wide variety of musical influences.

Sarmast graduated from an Afghan music school in 1981. He later left Afghanistan in the 1990s due to the Afghan civil war. Sarmast earned a master's degree in musicology in 1993 from Moscow State Conservatory. He was given asylum in Australia in 1994. In 2005, Sarmast became the first Afghan to earn a Ph.D. in music, earning his Ph.D. from Monash University.

== Founding the Afghan National Institute of Music ==
Sarmast returned to Afghanistan to help revive music in his native country after the defeat of the Taliban. Under the invitation of the Afghan Ministry of Education, Sarmast returned with a plan to restore Afghan music traditions that had been suppressed under years of Taliban rule. In 2006, Sarmast had outlined his proposal in the Revival of Afghan Music (ROAM), wanting to open a dedicated music school with a curriculum combining both Afghan and Western music. Sarmast returned to Afghanistan in 2008. He formally opened the Afghanistan National Institute of Music (ANIM) in Kabul on June 20, 2010.

Ahmad Sarmast originally planned to offer music education exclusively to underprivileged children, orphans and street kids. The Afghan Ministry of Education wanted him to open the school to talented students, so in the end an agreement was reached for a fifty-fifty split. The underprivileged children at ANIM receive a stipend of $30 per month to allow them to focus on school.

Sarmast also placed great importance on offering a co-educational learning environment, a rare situation in Afghanistan, listing that as his greatest achievement at the school.

In 2013, ANIM's Afghan Youth Orchestra toured the United States, including performances at Carnegie Hall and the Kennedy Center. In 2015, the first Afghan female conductor, Negin Khpolwak, held her first concert with an all-female ensemble.

== Victim of Taliban attack ==
Sarmast was injured in a suicide attack by the Taliban on the Centre d'Enseignement Français en Afghanistan on Dec 11, 2014. Following the attack, the Taliban released a statement accusing Sarmast of corrupting the youth of Afghanistan.

Immediately after the attack, Sarmast lost consciousness and lost hearing in both ears, as both of his eardrums were perforated, resulting in him becoming completely deaf. He was rushed to a hospital in Kabul for emergency surgery. Later, he returned to Australia, where surgeons removed eleven pieces of shrapnel from the back of his head, restoring partial hearing to one of his ears. Sarmast stills has PTSD as a result of the attack.

== Further information ==
Sarmast spends time annotating Afghan music in Western notation to help record a mostly oral Afghan music tradition. He also hopes to rearrange Afghan music in the Western Classical tradition.

Sarmast has plans to build a concert hall and girl's dormitory at the current institute. Sarmast is also hoping to build music schools in other cities in Afghanistan, primarily Mazar-i-Sharif, Jalalabad and Herat. He also dreams of eventually setting up a Symphony Orchestra of Afghanistan.

Sarmast was the subject of a 2012 documentary, Dr. Sarmast’s Music School, directed by Polly Watkins and Beth Frey.

In 2018, Sarmast and the Afghan National Institute of Music were awarded the Polar Music Prize.

The 2018 Polar Music Prize is awarded to the Afghanistan National Institute of Music (ANIM) and Dr Ahmad Sarmast, its visionary founder and director, in recognition of how this inspirational organization has used the power of music to transform young people’s lives.

== Works ==
- A Survey of the History of Music in Afghanistan: Special Reference to Art Music from c. 1000 A.D. VDM Verlag. 2009. ISBN 978-3639131505.

== Bibliography ==
- "Dr Sarmast's Music School". Al Jazeera. 17 January 2013.
- "Music making comeback in Afghanistan". Arab News. 27 January 2013.
- "Ahmad Sarmast, the man who revived music in Afghanistan". China Central Television. June 2, 2015. Archived from the original on September 19, 2015.
- Bezhan, Frud (August 9, 2015). "The Day Afghan Music Didn't Die". Radio Free Europe.
- Coren, Anna (September 21, 2012). "Music school strikes chord with Afghan street kids". CNN.
- Crouch, Graham (January 17, 2013). "Afghan Music Students Take Their Show on the Road". World Bank.
- Gallagher, Kimball. "Dr. Ahmad Sarmast on the Afghanistan National Institute of Music". Notes on the Road. Archived from the original on 23 December 2015.
- Khalil, Shaimaa (November 10, 2015). "Afghanistan's first female conductor". BBC.
- Nakano, Wataru (June 15, 2012). "After the Taliban: Afghanistan reclaiming its musical heritage". Asahi Shimbun. Archived from the original on 28 August 2015.
- Rasmussen, Sune Engel (May 25, 2015). "He was the saviour of Afghan music. Then a Taliban bomb took his hearing". The Guardian.
- Ross, Alex (March 4, 2013). "Border Crossings East meets West at Carnegie Hall". The New Yorker.
- Rubin, Alissa J.; Wakin, Daniel J. (Feb 1, 2013). "How Do You Get to Carnegie Hall? Start in Kabul". The New York Times.
- Ryan, Rosanna (August 7, 2015). "Emma Ayres on her new adventure: teaching music in Afghanistan". Australian Broadcasting Corporation.
- Scherer, Barrymore Laurence (Feb 11, 2013). "Making Music Against the Odds". The Wall Street Journal.
