= Afghanistan National Institute of Music =

School in Kabul, Afghanistan

- Kabul, Afghanistan (until 2021); Braga, Portugal (since 2021)

Information
- Established: 20 June 2010; 16 years ago
- Director: Dr. Ahmad Naser Sarmast
- Website: http://www.anim-music.org/

The Afghanistan National Institute of Music (ANIM) is an exiled school of music that was formerly operated in Kabul, Afghanistan until the recapturing of Kabul by the Taliban and is currently based in Braga, Portugal. It was founded in 2010 by the Afghan-Australian ethnomusicologist Dr. Ahmad Naser Sarmast, and offers a curriculum combining the tuition of both Afghan and Western music. ANIM is a co-educational institute.

Per an agreement between Sarmast and the Afghan Ministry of Education, the school accommodates both exceptionally talented students and underprivileged children.

== History ==
In 2006, Dr. Ahmad Naser Sarmast, then a Research Fellow at the Monash School of Music and Asia Institute, of Australia's Monash University, returned to Afghanistan to assess the situation after many years of living in exile. A second trip was made in 2007 to discuss the implementation of the pilot project with the Afghan authorities and more precisely, the rebuilding of music education through establishing a dedicated music school for disadvantaged Afghan children. In April 2008, after two years of negotiations with Afghan authorities, Sarmast went again to Afghanistan to lead and implement the establishment of the Afghanistan National Institute of Music (ANIM).

In 2013, ANIM's Afghan Youth Orchestra toured the United States, including performances at Carnegie Hall and the Kennedy Center.

In 2014, a suicide bomb attack at a student concert killed an audience member and the bomber, and injured many more, including Sarmast himself, who lost some of his hearing.

In 2015, the first Afghan female conductor, 17-year-old Negin Khpalwak, held her first concert with an all-female ensemble. As of 2018, a third of the 250 students are female and the proportion is growing; in 2019, Sarmast took the all-female Zohra Orchestra on a European tour.

In 2018, the Afghanistan National Institute of Music and Sarmast were awarded the Polar Music Prize.

After the Taliban's recapture of Kabul on 15 August 2021, everything was destroyed, including all the school's instruments, and ANIM's administrators and students relocated to Braga, Portugal.
