= The Sailor (2021 film) =

2021 Slovak documentary film directed by Lucia Kašová

- Directed by: Lucia Kašová
- Written by: Lucia Kašová
- Produced by: Nazarij Kľujev
- Cinematography: Martin Jurči
- Edited by: Roman Kelemen
- Music by: Martin Turčan
- Release date: 2021
- Running time: 78 minutes
- Country: Slovakia
- Language: English

The Sailor is a 2021 Slovak documentary film directed by Lucia Kašová. The film follows Paul Johnson, an elderly sailor living aboard his boat near Carriacou in Grenada the Caribbean, as he confronts old age, isolation and the end of his life at sea.

The film had its world premiere in the World Showcase section of the Hot Docs Canadian International Documentary Festival in 2021. It subsequently screened at more than 30 international film festivals in Europe, North America and Africa.

At the 2021 Flickers' Rhode Island International Film Festival, The Sailor received the Grand Prize for Best Feature Documentary.

== Plot ==
The film follows Paul Johnson, an approximately 80-year-old sailor who lives aboard his boat, Cherub, near the island of Carriacou in the southern Caribbean. Johnson spent most of his life at sea and did not settle permanently on land. By the time of the film, both Johnson and his boat are no longer fit to sail.

Johnson reflects on his life and mortality while continuing to live aboard his boat. The film observes his daily life, including his attempts to maintain the vessel and his interactions with people on the island. A hurricane warning forms part of the film's setting as Johnson's physical limitations and the deteriorating condition of his boat become increasingly apparent.

The documentary explores the relationship between freedom and selfishness and considers the consequences of a life devoted to independence. Kašová described the film as being less about sailing itself than about the relationship between freedom and selfishness and what remains at the end of such a journey.

== Production ==
=== Development ===
The Sailor was directed and written by Lucia Kašová and produced by Nazarij Kľujev for the Slovak production company TOXPRO. Martin Jurči served as cinematographer, Roman Kelemen as editor and Martin Turčan composed the music.

Kašová originally became interested in people living outside conventional social and national structures on Caribbean islands. After meeting Paul Johnson on Carriacou, she changed the focus of the project from a broader portrait of sailors to an individual portrait of Johnson.

The project was presented at several international film-industry forums, including Beldocs in Serbia, DocsBarcelona in Spain, Meeting Point Vilnius in Lithuania and the Marché du Film in Cannes, France. At the 10th Meeting Point Vilnius in 2019, the project received the Post Production Award, providing post-production assistance services towards completion of the film, while producer Nazarij Kľujev received an invitation to participate in the Marché du Film Industry Workshop in Cannes.

=== Filming ===
The film was shot over two months on Carriacou in Grenada. Filming took place directly before hurricane season, which became an element of the film's setting.

Kašová uses an observational approach, filming Johnson at close range and incorporating archive material and images of the island. Cinematographer Martin Jurči's camera remains closely focused on Johnson and his surroundings.

== Release ==
The Sailor had its world premiere at the 2021 Hot Docs Canadian International Documentary Festival in Toronto, in the World Showcase section.

The film was released theatrically in Slovakia in July 2021, with Film Expanded handling domestic distribution.

The film was subsequently screened at international festivals. The director's filmography lists more than 30 festival appearances in America, Europe and Africa. Festival listings include the Bergamo Film Meeting in Italy, the Ismailia International Film Festival in Egypt and Days of European Cinema in Prague.

The film was also screened in Grenada, where it was filmed. A Caribbean screening and review were reported by Caribbean Compass in October 2021.

== Reception ==
Cineuropa's review described The Sailor as Kašová's first feature-length documentary and praised its portrait of a man who had lived according to his own principles but had become increasingly isolated in old age.

The review noted that the film concentrates on Johnson rather than treating the Caribbean setting as a conventional travel-film subject. It also highlighted the contrast between Johnson's former life at sea and his increasingly restricted existence on his boat.

Caribbean Compass published a review of the documentary in October 2021, describing it as an award-winning documentary about Johnson and reporting on its Hot Docs premiere and Rhode Island International Film Festival award.

== Awards, nominations and screenings ==
Award	Date of ceremony	Category	Result
Flickers' Rhode Island International Film Festival	2021	Grand Prize for Best Feature Documentary	Won
30th Slovak Film Critics Awards	2022	Best Slovak Feature Documentary Film	Won
Ismailia International Film Festival	2022	FIPRESCI Special Mention	Won
Meeting Point – Vilnius	2019	Post-Production Award (Note: Awarded to the project during development, providing €3,500 in post-production services.)	Won

=== Festival screenings ===
Festival	Year	Location	Note
Hot Docs Canadian International Documentary Festival	2021	Toronto, Canada	World premiere
Flickers' Rhode Island International Film Festival	2021	Providence, United States	U.S. premiere, also Grand Prize for Best Feature Documentary[
Art Film Fest	2021	Košice, Slovakia	Slovak premiere
International Film Festival Cinematik	2021	Piešťany, Slovakia	Official selection
IndieCork	2021	Cork, Ireland	Irish premiere
Jihlava International Documentary Film Festival	2021	Jihlava, Czech Republic	Czech premiere
1261 Film Festival	2021	Grenada	Caribbean premiere
Nordics Adventure Film Festival	2021	Denmark	Danish premiere
London International Documentary Festival	2022	London, United Kingdom	UK premiere
Bergamo Film Meeting	2022	Bergamo, Italy	Italian premiere
Ismailia International Film Festival	2022	Ismailia, Egypt	African premiere; FIPRESCI Special Mention
Days of European Cinema	2022	Prague, Czech Republic	Official selection
