= Vera Tsu Weiling =

Chinese violinist (born 1960)

- Also known as: Vera Tsu, Vera Tsu Wei Ling, Vera Tsu Wei-ling
- Born: 1960 (age 65–66); Shanghai
- Instrument: Violin
- Formerly of: The China Trio

Vera Tsu Weiling (born 1960) is a Chinese professional violinist and Professor and Master tutor of the Central Conservatory in Beijing and Shanghai Conservatory. She is featured in the Academy Award winning documentary From Mao to Mozart: Isaac Stern in China, directed by Murray Lerner. Tsu Weiling serves as co-chairman of the Shanghai Isaac Stern International Violin Competition and vice-president of the China Violin Society.

== Early life ==
Tsu Weiling was born in the city of Shanghai, China, and began playing the violin at the age of 3 under the guidance of her father. Both her parents were amateur musicians; her father played the violin whilst working as an electrical engineer, and her mother played the piano whilst working as a nurse. Tsu Weiling was first denied violin lessons by her father due to her young age of 3. Upon protest from Tsu Weiling, her father made a deal that if she could hold her body and arms in the correct violin playing position during the time it took for him to run errands, he would teach her to play. Unfortunately, he forgot the deal, and she was left standing for hours such that upon his return, Tsu Weiling's face had "turned green" resorting to her being given a small one-eighth violin. She would continue to learn from her father for another 13 years.

=== Cultural Revolution ===
The Cultural Revolution, which began during Tsu Weiling's childhood, restricted all permitted music to eight Peking operas approved by Jiang Qing, the wife of Mao Zedong. Since the classical music that Tsu Weiling was taught was banned, she was forced to hide her violin practices, often in basements. She describes this period of her life and the fear of prosecution:

"We had a basement, actually, a very small room, and I practiced very secretively. You had to draw the curtain and play in a dark room, using a mute. You could not let people see you practice, because they called it 'unhealthy music.' We had seven or eight 'red songs' from Peking Opera, and they were all that was played. That was the only kind of music that people were allowed to hear."

Tsu Weiling also relied on music scores smuggled in from visiting Soviet Union musicians, which were then hand copied using pencil and passed to her, often with wrong notes or rhythms due to the copying process. Among the banned scores they were able to copy were etudes by Schradieck, Sevcik, Kreutzer, and Dancla. However, since concertos were so rare to find, Tsu Weiling had not even heard of Mendelssohn's Concerto until it was secretly copied. She comments that "...this is how we learned, with no recordings, nothing. No model we could learn from. It was very difficult situation during the Cultural Revolution." Around Tsu Weiling's sophomore year in high school, circa 1976, The Gang of Four, who had controlled the cultural and educational systems in China by enforcing the ideals of the Cultural Revolution, collapsed. This allowed her to audition for the Central Conservatory of Music after schools and universities were re-opened to college students, following a ban spanning ten years being lifted.

== Career ==
Tsu Weiling began her studies at the Central Conservatory in Beijing in 1977 as part of the first generation of college students post-Cultural Revolution. During her second year of college in 1979, Tsu Weiling performed in front of violin master Isaac Stern when he visited China. She was subsequently featured in the documentary From Mao to Mozart: Isaac Stern in China, directed by Murray Lerner, which details Stern's visit and his experiences being the first American musician to collaborate with the Chinese orchestra. She can be seen playing an excerpt from Caprice after a study in the form of a waltz by Saint-Saens, arranged by Ysaÿe. The documentary won an Academy Award for Best Documentary Feature in 1981. Tsu Weiling describes meeting Stern as "revolutionary. Like a tornado", and upon hearing him play, she comments, "it was like being in the desert for so long, and then all of a sudden – water! A fountain!". The meeting inspired her to pursue studies abroad. During filming, Tsu Weiling met violinist and conductor Yehudi Menuhin who sponsored her to study in Switzerland.

In 1980 Tsu Weiling travelled to America where she first studied at the Peabody Conservatory with Daniel Heifetz. She then enrolled in the Juilliard School of Music to be mentored by Dorothy DeLay, where she remained for three years until she transferred to the Manhatton School of Music to study with Raphael Bronstein. In 1981 she won first place at the Manoque International Young Artist Competition, and would soon after win the Waldo Mayo Talent Award and the Artists International Competition.

In 1984 Tsu Weiling had her debut recital at Carnegie Hall, and in 1988 she performed at Avery Fisher Hall with the New York Symphony Orchestra, becoming the first violinist from mainland China to perform as a soloist at both venues. Between 1993 and 2000, Tsu Weiling held the position of First Associate Concertmaster of the Hong Kong Philharmonic Orchestra where her husband, maestro Long Yu, was guest conductor. Tsu Weiling holds two professorships; one from the Central Conservatory in Beijing in November 2000, and the other awarded by The Shanghai Conservatory in September 2014.

In 2009 Tsu Weiling created the China Trio with pianist Sheng Yuan and cellist Zhu Yibing. One of the main reasons for forming the trio is to provide the Chinese public an opportunity to listen to chamber music, which has a more intimate experience than orchestral concerts due to the much smaller number of players performing, in this case, three. To explain a lack of chamber music presence in China, Tsu Weiling cites pressures for soloists to focus on their solo careers rather than divert time towards small group performances, "I founded The China Trio with two like-minded musicians to fill a vacancy for professional chamber music in China". The China Trio performed at the Shanghai Music in the Summer Air Festival in 2016.

In 2016, Tsu Weiling and her husband, conductor Long Yu, honoured Isaac Stern by launching The Shanghai Isaac Stern International Violin Competition; the first ever international competition in her hometown. Tsu Weiling served as a judge for this competition. In an interview, she expressed the cultural and political significance of Shanghai hosting such a violinist competition:

"Before, I couldn't even dream of all these people in my own city, and also being a judge in an international-level competition," she said. "We were so isolated in China: no music, no recordings, no live performance, no idea what real music is. And now, we have our own competition, bringing so many great musicians together in this city. This changes things tremendously."

She is married to a conductor, Long Yu and they have one daughter.

=== Teaching style ===
Tsu Weiling teaches violin at the Central Conservatory in Beijing, the Shanghai Conservatory, as well as a masterclass in Mozart's violin sonata no. 27 in G-major, K379 at the iClassical Academy. The masterclass entails analysis of the composition by Tsu Weiling to provide detailed notes on bow distribution, stylistic pauses between notes to underline the sound, and attention to the conversational flow between piano and violin.

In an interview with The Strad, Tsu Weiling describes her approach to performing as a soloist among an orchestra, stating that one should learn the entire score as well as the solo part so they can perform with confidence, "the more prepared you are, the more room you have to adjust." She also states that being afraid of playing wrong notes or forgetting parts hinders soloists, causing them to "play like machines" by not making eye contact with the conductor and orchestra.

"A performance should be a conversation between the soloist, the conductor and the orchestra; at the same time you have to communicate with the audience. Music should connect, no matter what, through slow notes, long notes, melodic passages, fast passages – even when you have an eight-bar rest while the orchestra plays."

Among Tsu Weiling's pupils are Renchao Yu (2018 Zarin Mehta Fellow), Angela Chan, and Strauss Shi.

Tsu Weiling is vocal about the need to continuously improve and credits the opportunities she was given for her achievements, "For me, the most disturbing problem at present is not the technical difficulties, but the most basic skills that we gain learning violin at the very beginning...It's more like a feeling and hard to explain but I enjoy, above anything else, the moment when I can extend a beautiful note and let it breathe. I am lucky to have so many great opportunities – and I took them...I will play my violin as long as I can."

== Jury positions ==
Tsu Weiling regularly serves as a jury member on a number of notable violin competitions which can provide prize winners with funds and in some cases, loans of valuable instruments such as Stradivarius violins. She credits the opportunity of judging these competitions for improving her own teaching style and solo performances.

List of jury positions:

- Sion Valais International Violin Competition (Switzerland), 2005
- The Queen Elisabeth Competition (Brussels, Belgium), 2009, 2012
- The First International Violin Competition Buenos Aires (Argentina), 2010
- The 11th Pablo Sarasate International Violin Competition (Spain), 2011
- The 3rd Munetsugu Angel Violin Competition, (Japan), 2011
- Henryk Wieniawski Violin Competition 2011, 2016
- The Menuhin Competition, 2012
- The Alice and Eleonore Schoenfeld International String Competition, 2014
- The XV International Tchaikovsky Violin Competition Moscow (Russia), 2015.
- The Shanghai Isaac Stern International Violin Competition (China), 2016, 2018
- Elmar Oliveria International Violin Competition, 2017
- The Isangyun Competition presented by the Tongyeong International Music Foundation, 2017
- The First International Viktor Tretyakov Violin Competition 2018

== List of notable performances ==
- Premiere of Tan Dun's Out of Peking Opera and Symphony No. 3 The Great Wall, conducted by David Eaton. Soloist with the New York Symphony Orchestra, at Avery Fisher Hall, in 1988
- Solo recital in the national gala for society of members of the Légion d'honneur at the Theatre des Champs-Élysées in Paris 1993, performing Sonate in E-flat Major by Strauss, Melodie and Scherzo by Tchaikovski, and Polonaise brillante by Wieniawski. Chen Jiang on piano accompaniment.
- Soloist with Berlin Radio Symphony Orchestra during their in Berlin and China tour in October 1998
- Beijing Music Festival where Tsu Weiling performed with Issac Stern, 1999.
- At the Shanghai Oriental Arts Center, performing the Beethoven Violin Concerto with conductor Krzysztof Penderecki, 2005
- Opening ceremony of the Women's Forum for the Economy & Society, 2007
- During the 11th Beijing Music Festival in 2008, Tsu Weiling performed Bernstein's Serenade, which was also broadcast in Times Square, New York City
- As part of the opening of the Shanghai Spring International Music Festival, Tsu Weiling played Tan Dun's violin concerto Out of Peking Opera with Shanghai Symphony Orchestra, 30 years after its first performance in at Avery Fisher Hall

== Discography ==
Title	Album details	Release details
Chen/He: Butterfly Lovers Violin Concerto (The) / A Ke: Violin Concerto	Soloist with Shanghai Philharmonic Orchestra; Composer(s): A. Kejian, Gang Chen, Zhanhao He; Conductor(s): Cao Peng	Released: 1994; Label: Marco Polo; Formats: CD
Korngold/Goldmark: Violin Concertos	Soloist with Razumovsky Symphony Orchestra; Composer(s): Karl Goldmark, Erich Wolfgang Korngold; Conductor(s): Long Yu	Released: 1996; Label: Marco Polo; Formats: CD
Hall of Fame	Compilation	Released: 1996; Label: Marco Polo; Formats: CD
Korngold/Goldmark: Violin Concertos	Soloist with Razumovsky Symphony Orchestra; Composer(s): Karl Goldmark, Erich Wolfgang Korngold; Conductor(s): Long Yu	Released: 1997; Label: Naxos; Formats: CD
Dreaming of My Motherland-Vera Tsui	Soloist with Shanghai Philharmonic Orchestra; Composer(s): Gang Chen, Zhi Huan, Guang Ren, Xiang-lin Zhou, Xiaogu Zhu; Conductor(s): Cao Peng	Released: 1998; Label: Marco Polo; Formats: CD
Discover the Classics, vol.3: The Concerto	Compilation	Released: 1999; Label: Naxos Educational; Formats: CD
Marco Polo Sampler	Compilation	Released: 2000; Label: Marco Polo; Formats: CD
