= Mayu Kishima =

Japanese violinist (born 1986)

Mayu Kishima 木嶋真優
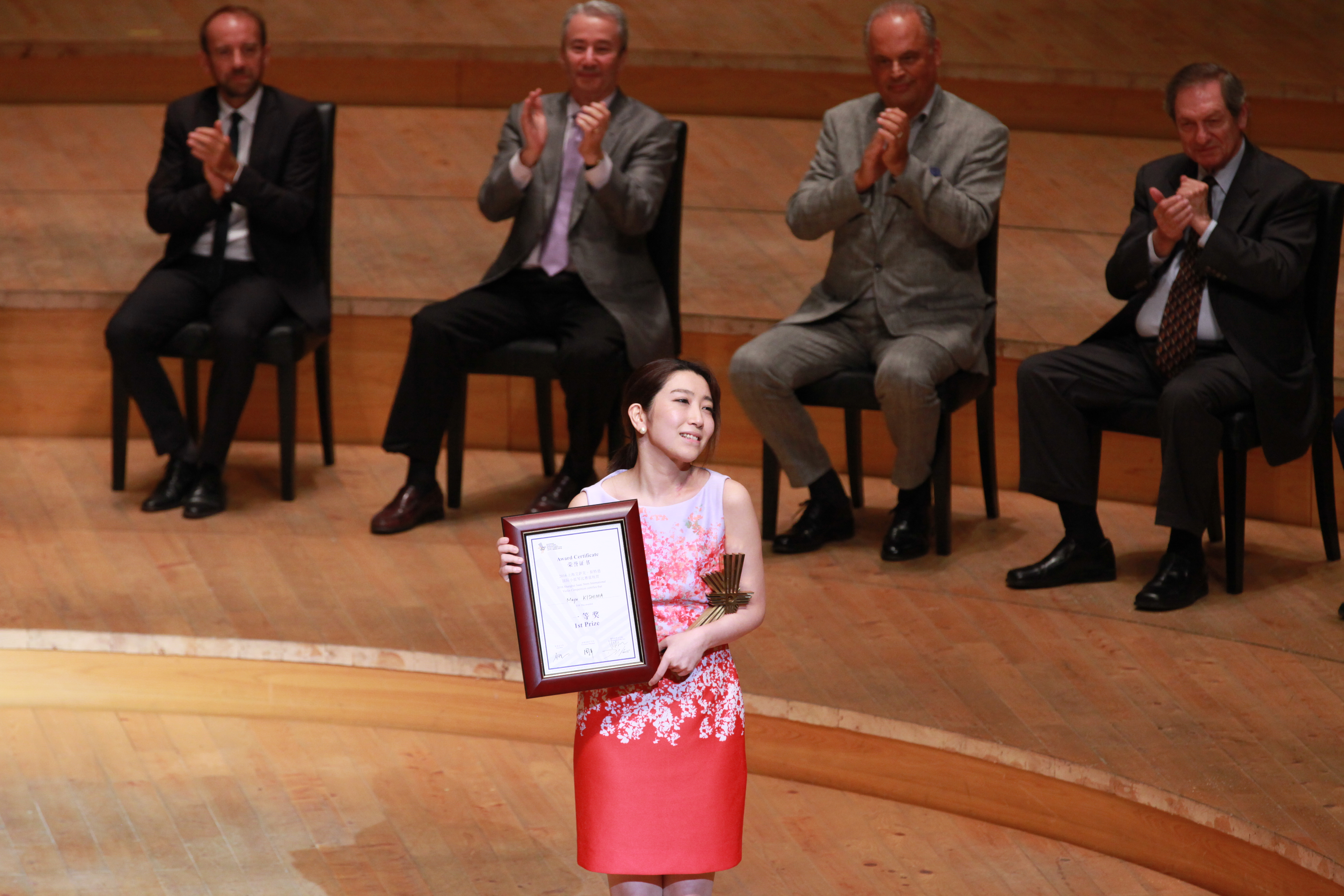
- Kishima after winning first place at the inaugural Shanghai Isaac Stern International Violin Competition, 2016

Background information
- Born: December 13, 1986 (age 39); Kobe, Japan
- Genres: Classical
- Occupation: Violinist
- Instrument: Violin
- Website: 2005 archive of official website

Mayu Kishima (Japanese: 木嶋真優, romanized: Kishima Mayū) (born December 13, 1986) is a Japanese violinist. She is affiliated with Miyazawa Company and Watanabe Entertainment. She has won many major awards, beginning when she was a young child, and she began winning international awards in her teens.

== Early life ==
Kishima was born in Kobe, Hyōgo Prefecture, on December 13, 1986. She began studying the violin at the age of three and a half under the guidance of Izumi Hayashi. Kishima knew when she was very little she would become a violinist. Even before entering school, she won the gold medal at a children's competition in Kyoto for three consecutive years: 1990, 1991, 1992. At the age of seven, she participated in Midori Goto's lecture concert, and at the age of nine, in 1996, she participated in Isaac Stern's lecture concert at the Miyazaki International Chamber Music Festival. Stern's rule was each participant could only attend one year, but he made an exception for Kishima and let her attend three years in a row. This meeting would play a pivotal role in her future.

At the age of nine, she made her orchestral debut performing the first movement of Mendelssohn58's Violin Concerto with the Cojima Musica Collegia conducted by Hideo Kojima. In 1998, she won first place in the elementary school division of the 52nd All-Japan Student Music Competition in Osaka. She studied under Toshiya Eto, Machie Oguri, Kazuyo Togami, and Masao Kawasaki. As a child, her violin heroes were Anne-Sophie Mutter and Maxim Vengerov.

She attended Kobayashi Sacred Heart Girls' Elementary School and then went on to the same junior high school. In her second year of junior high school, she transferred to Takarazuka Municipal Junior High School.

== Youth career ==
In 1997, she attended the Aspen Music Festival and School in the United States, where she studied under Dorothy DeLay.

In 1999, she won the top prize (second place, no first place winner) at the Japan Classical Music Competition National Finals, and she performed at the 25th regular concert of the Izmir Symphony Orchestra in İzmir, Turkey. The following year, she performed at Carnegie Hall and other venues.

In 2001, she won the top prize (second place, no first place winner) in the junior division of the Henryk Wieniawski Violin Competition.

Between 1999 and 2002, she attended seminars in Yokohama with Zakhar Bron. In 2002, she received an international scholarship from the Japanese Ministry of Culture. Since then, she has lived in Germany, studying violin under Professor Zakhar Bron at the Cologne University of Music.

== Adult career ==
Bron was so impressed with Kishima that he introduced her to Mstislav Rostropovich, who said of her "the world's best young violinist". As a result, she toured the US and Europe with Rostropovich throughout 2005. The concerts were well-received in European and American newspapers. The German newspaper Frankfurter Allgemeine Zeitung commented, "Just as Karajan brought Anne-Sophie Mutter and Maazel brought Hilary Hahn to global attention, Rostropovich brought Kijima Mayu to the world." She has frequently performed with renowned violist Yuri Bashmet, and has been recognized by violin virtuoso Ivry Gitlis, performing at the Martha Argerich Music Festival in Lugano, Switzerland, and with the NHK Symphony Orchestra, among others. Conductor Seiji Ozawa has also attracted attention by inviting Kishima to join the Saito Kinen Orchestra and the Mito Chamber Orchestra, both of which he leads.

In the spring of 2012, she graduated from the Cologne University of Music with honors, and in the autumn of 2015, she graduated from that same school's Performing Arts Graduate School with highest honors and earned a German national performer qualification.

She has played with two Antonio Stradivari violins: the 1699 "Walner", specially loaned from the Munetsugu Collection by the NPO Yellow Angel, as well as the "ex-Petri" 1700 violin, loaned by Dr. Ryuji Ueno.

In 2006, she performed in Europe with the Japan Philharmonic Orchestra conducted by Kenichiro Kobayashi, and she also accompanied the Prague Symphony Orchestra on their tour of Japan. In June 2003, she was selected by Vladimir Ashkenazy to perform as the soloist for Tzigane in the recording of Ravel's Orchestral Works with the NHK Symphony Orchestra conducted by Ashkenazy. In 2009 she was a laureate in the Queen Elisabeth Competition 2009 (for violin) in Brussels. After studying abroad at the University of Cologne, she began to perform frequently throughout Europe, and she also gave concerts as a chamber musician. In October 2011, she won first prize at the Cologne International Violin Competition and the Dave Garrett award.

In 2015, Kishima decided to stop entering competitions after participating in the International Tchaikovsky Competition, as she felt she did not do well in them because of mental blocks she developed. A performing tour in Japan after the Tchaikovsky Competition helped boost her confidence, and she decided to do one more competition. In 2016, she won first prize of $100,000 (USD) at the 1st Shanghai Isaac Stern International Violin Competition.

On March 6, 2024, to commemorate the extension of the Hokuriku Shinkansen, IOWN APN held a remote music concert connecting Kanazawa and Tokyo, a distance of approximately 1,000 km, the longest in the world.

=== Recordings ===
Kishima has released two solo albums: Chaconne in 2008 and Rise in 2012, which was her second CD. On August 7, 2024, she released another album Dear. Her collaboration with the younger jazz pianist Takeshi Obayashi marked a new beginning. In an interview, she said, "I extracted the melodies that came from within me, filtered my feelings of love, and created them together with Obayashi."

== Personal life ==
In 2019, she married a company executive. She announced the marriage on the February 26, 2020, broadcast of the program "Kon'ya Kurabete Mita" (Nippon Television).

== Significant awards ==
- 2001 – Top Prize (Junior Division) at the 8th Henryk Wieniawski Violin Competition (Note: Also reported as occurring in 2000)
- 2001 – Kobe Matsukata Hall Music Prize, in Kobe, Japan
- 2003 – First Prize Patrus International Violin Competition
- 2004 – First Prize Novosibirsk
- 2016 – First Prize Shanghai Isaac Stern International Violin Competition
