= Afghan Youth Orchestra =

Exiled youth orchestra

The Afghan Youth Orchestra is an exiled youth orchestra that was formerly based in Afghanistan. It was founded by the Afghanistan National Institute of Music under the Ministry of Education. In 2013, the orchestra travelled to Carnegie Hall to perform for an American audience with the aim of spreading peace. After the Taliban takeover in 2021, the Afghan Youth Orchestra and its parent institute is relocated to Portugal.

== See also ==
- List of youth orchestras
