= From Mao to Mozart: Isaac Stern in China =

- DVD cover art for 2001 release
- Directed by: Murray Lerner
- Produced by: Walter Scheuer
- Starring: Isaac Stern; David Golub
- Cinematography: David Bridges; Nick Knowland
- Edited by: Tom Haneke
- Production companies: Hopewell Foundation; Harmony Film
- Distributed by: United Artists Classics
- Release date: 1979
- Running time: 84 minutes
- Countries: United States; China
- Languages: English; Mandarin; Wu
- Box office: $1,205,934

From Mao to Mozart: Isaac Stern in China is a 1979 documentary film about Western culture breaking into China produced and directed by Murray Lerner. It portrays the famous violinist and music teacher Isaac Stern as the first American musician to collaborate with the China Central Symphony Society (now China National Symphony Orchestra).

== Contents ==
The film documented Stern's rehearsals and performances of violin concertos by Wolfgang Amadeus Mozart and Johannes Brahms. Stern is featured with the famous Chinese conductor Li Delun, who also acted as his guide and translator on his trip. The film also included footage of Stern's visit to the Central Conservatory of Music and the Shanghai Conservatory of Music where he lectured to the Chinese music students on violin playing and the art of musical expression. Most of those musicians were playing mechanically, especially the String section, prior to the human improvements, concerning the qualities of the orchestras. One conductor was imprisoned in a closet for playing works by Ludwig van Beethoven, during the Cultural Revolution of the 1960s, when Western music was prohibited under the rule of Mao Zedong. Among many others talented players, young cellist Jian Wang (at the time only ten years old) is featured briefly. Jian Wang has gone on to international stardom. Another performer, violinist Vera Tsu Weiling, was featured playing Caprice after a study in the form of a waltz by Saint-Saens, arranged by Ysaÿe.

== Reception ==
The film won the Academy Award for Best Documentary Feature in 1981. It was also screened out of competition at the 1981 Cannes Film Festival.

== Preservation ==
The Academy Film Archive preserved Mao to Mozart in 2000.
