= Zohra Orchestra =

All-female orchestra in Afghanistan

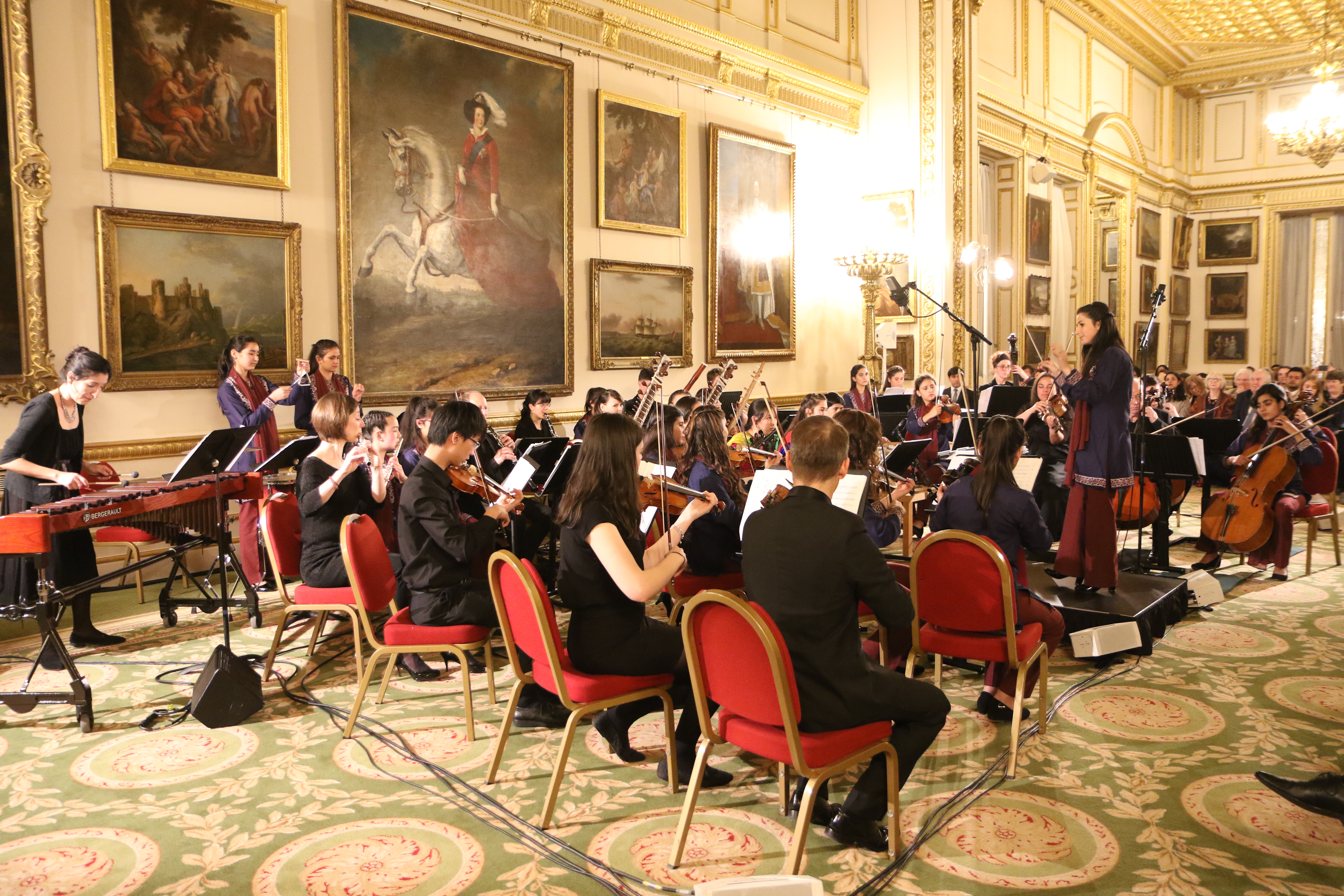
The orchestra performing in a joint concert with the Orchestra of St John's at Lancaster House, London, in 2019

The Zohra Orchestra, also known as the Afghan Women's Orchestra and Ensemble Zohra, is Afghanistan's first all-female orchestra, named after the music goddess in Persian writings. Founded in 2015, it has been in exile since the 2021 seizure of Kabul by the Taliban.

== History ==
The Zohra Orchestra was formed in 2015 in Kabul by the Afghanistan National Institute of Music and its founder Dr Ahmad Sarmast. The institute was formed in 2008 with the goal of bringing a musical education to young Afghans in the wake of liberation from the Taliban, under whom women's rights in Afghanistan were severely curtailed.

It is Afghanistan's first all-female orchestra, named after the music goddess in Persian writings, and also known as the Afghan Women's Orchestra and Ensemble Zohra.

=== Tours ===
The Zohra Orchestra has completed several high-profile tours since 2017. They have performed at the World Economic Forum and toured the United Kingdom in 2019, visiting the British Museum in London and the University of Oxford. In 2019, the orchestra's participation in the Pohoda Festival in Slovakia was the subject of the documentary Orchestra from the Land of Silence, directed by Slovak filmmaker Lucia Kašová. The film followed members of the orchestra during their preparations and journey to Europe.

In celebration of the 100th anniversary of Afghan independence in 2019, the Zohra Orchestra visited Australia on tour. On 12 and 14 October 2019, the orchestra performed concerts in Sydney and Melbourne. The first was held at Monash University, and the second at Sydney Opera House with over 1,500 guests in attendance. The event was co-organised by the Embassy of the Islamic Republic of Afghanistan and the Australian Government to concurrently celebrate 50 years of official diplomatic relations between the two countries.

=== 2021 Taliban takeover of Afghanistan ===
After the 2021 seizure of Kabul by the Taliban, the school building of the Afghanistan National Institute of Music (the orchestra's parent organization) was turned into a base by the Haqqani network guerrilla group. Many instruments were destroyed on the orders of the Taliban, which forbids instrumental and non-religious singing. Some women and girls from the orchestra were able to leave Afghanistan thanks to the Qatari government, but most have been unable to leave. In October 2021, members of the orchestra reassembled in Doha, Qatar, along with about 100 students and teachers of the Afghanistan National Institute of Music who were planning to relocate to Portugal.

== Musical styles ==
The orchestra performs traditional Afghan music, as well as Western classical music.

== Awards and recognition ==
Zohra has received numerous awards, including the Queen Soraya Award and the Freemuse Award in 2017, and the Montluc Resistance Liberté Award in 2018.
