= Garrett Keast =

American conductor (born 1971)

Garrett Keast (born 6 December 1971 in Houston) is an American conductor of symphony orchestra, opera, and ballet and founder of the Berlin Academy of American Music (BAAM).

== Biography ==
Keast began his career as associate conductor of the New York City Opera, resident conductor at the Queens Symphony Orchestra, and assistant conductor at the Dallas Opera, where he was awarded the Bruno Walter Foundation Career Development Grant. In 2006 & 08, he conducted the Naumburg Orchestral Concerts, in the Naumburg Bandshell, Central Park, in the summer series. Later, he began his European career as an assistant with conducting duties to the general music director at the Deutsche Oper Berlin, assistant and guest conductor at the Opéra National de Paris, and musical assistant to Christoph Eschenbach at the Wiener Staatsoper.

Based in Europe, Keast has conducted at the Elbphilharmonie in Hamburg, Concertgebouw in Amsterdam, the Centre for Fine Arts (BOZAR) in Brussels, Hamburg Staatsoper, Aspen Music Festival, Theater an der Wien, and Festspielhaus Baden-Baden.

Throughout his career, Keast has conducted performances with orchestras including the Wiener Tonkünstler-Orchester, Deutsches Symphonie-Orchester Berlin, SWR Symphonieorchester, NDR Elbphilharmonie Orchestra, MDR-Sinfonieorchester, Philharmonisches Staatsorchester Hamburg, Konzerthausorchester Berlin, Orchestre National du Capitole de Toulouse, Orchestre Philharmonique de Strasbourg, Royal Danish Orchestra, City of Prague Philharmonic Orchestra, Rundfunk-Sinfonieorchester Berlin, Philharmonisches Staatsorchester Hamburg, Staatsphilharmonie Rheinland-Pfalz, Atlanta Symphony Orchestra, New Jersey Symphony, Oregon Symphony, Fort Worth Symphony Orchestra, Los Angeles Opera Orchestra, Borusan Istanbul Philharmonic Orchestra, SWR Symphonieorchester, Aarhus Symphony Orchestra, Aalborg Symphony Orchestra, and Odense Symphony Orchestra.

In addition to orchestral works, Keast has conducted numerous opera and ballet performances worldwide. Productions include: Faust and Swan Lake with Opéra National de Paris, Prokofiev's Romeo et Juliette at the Opera National Capitole de Toulouse, Don Quixote with the Royal Swedish Ballet, Die Zauberflöte with Deutsche Oper Berlin, Sylvia and Jekyll & Hyde with Finnish National Opera & Ballet, La Bohème at the Aspen Music Festival, Der Fliegender Holländer at Theater Erfurt, Rigoletto at Theater Bremen, Carmen at Opera San Antonio, and Bluthaus at Oper Bonn.

== Berlin Academy of American Music ==
In 2021, Keast founded the chamber orchestra Berlin Academy of American Music (BAAM) for orchestra works with a strong connection to North America. An album called Transatlantic was recorded at Teldex Studio in Berlin and published by Onyx in London in October 2021. It contains works of Aaron Copland, Avner Dorman, Igor Stravinsky, Craig Urquhart and Toru Takemitsu. Soloists were Stathis Karapanos und Chen Reiss. Reviews were published in Fanfare Magazine, Das Orchester and the BBC Music Magazine amongst others.
