= Oxana Shevchenko =

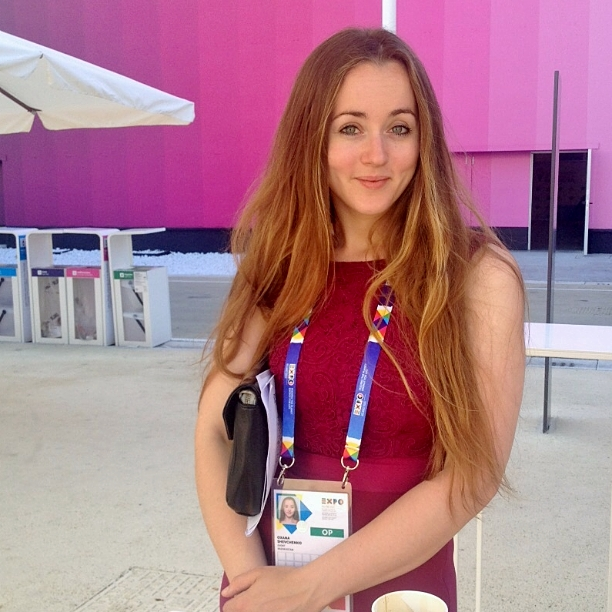
- Oxana Shevchenko as part of the Kazakh delegation at EXPO

Background information
- Born: May 30, 1987 (age 37); Almaty, Soviet Kazakhstan
- Genres: Classical
- Occupation: Pianist
- Years active: 1996–present
- Labels: Delphian Records, Claves
- Website: www.oxanashevchenko.com

Oxana Shevchenko (born May 30, 1987, Almaty) is a Kazakh classical pianist and the 2010 winner of the Scottish International Piano Competition. She has performed with various orchestras and has been active as a soloist, chamber musician, and collaborative pianist.

== Early life and education ==
Shevchenko studied at the Republican Special Music School for Gifted Children in Almaty under Valentina Tartyshnaya. She later attended the Moscow Conservatory Music College, where she studied with Tatiana Rakova, before earning a degree from the Moscow Conservatory under Elena Kuznetsova

She continued her studies at the Royal College of Music in London with Dmitri Alexeev, supported by the Queen Elizabeth Scholarship Trust. She later pursued further training at the Haute École de Musique de Lausanne with Jean-François Antonioli and at the Accademia Nazionale di Santa Cecilia in Rome under Benedetto Lupo .

== Career ==
Shevchenko made her solo debut at the age of 9 with the State Symphony Orchestra of Kazakhstan. Over the years, she has collaborated with renowned orchestras, including the BBC Scottish Symphony Orchestra, Sydney Symphony Orchestra, Orchestre de Chambre de Lausanne, NorrlandsOperan, and the Arena di Verona Orchestra. She has performed under conductors such as Vladimir Ashkenazy , Rumon Gamba, Yoel Levi, Ronald Corp, and Martyn Brabbins .

She has performed in venues such as the Royal Festival Hall, Wigmore Hall, Auditorium Parco della Musica, Saint Petersburg Philharmonic, Sydney Opera House, Doge's Palace, Genoa , Teatro Filarmonico, Konzerthaus Berlin, Palau de la Música de València, and the Atatürk Cultural Center. Shevchenko has also participated in major festivals, including the Lucerne Festival, Sion Festival , Istanbul Festival, and the Newbury Spring Festival .

Her recordings and interviews have been broadcast by major radio and television channels such as BBC Radio 3 , Radio Orpheus, Rai 3, Schweizer Radio und Fernsehen , and TVR Cultural.

=== Chamber music ===
As a chamber musician, Shevchenko has collaborated with renowned ensembles and musicians, including the Kopelman Quartet, Brodsky Quartet, Christoph Croisé, Narek Hakhnazaryan , and Andrei Baranov.

== Recordings ==
- Debut Album (2011), Delphian Records
  - Featuring works by Shostakovich, Mozart, Liszt, and Ravel.
- Stravinsky: Complete Works for Solo Piano (2017), Delphian Records
- Aloÿse Fornerod Portrait with HEMU Symphony Orchestra and Emmanuel Siffert, Claves Records
- Visions (2015) with Christoph Croisé, QUARTZ
- Joachim Raff: Complete Works for Cello and Piano (2022) with Christoph Croisé; Avie Records
- Voyage Exotique (2023) with Christoph Croisé; Avie Records
- 1883 (2023) with Christoph Croisé; Avie Records

== Awards and honours ==
List of Awards
Year	Award	Country	Category	Result	Ref
2005	International Balys Dvarionas Competition	Lithuania		Won	
2007	Sendai International Music Competition	Japan	Best Performance of the XX Century Concerto	Third	
2009	Ferruccio Busoni International Piano Competition	Italy	International Music Critics' Prize	Fourth	
2009	Ferruccio Busoni International Piano Competition	Italy	Best Performance of Busoni's Work	Won	
2009	Shanghai International Piano Competition	China		Third	
2010	Scottish International Piano Competition	United Kingdom		Won	
2010	Tchaikovsky International Competition	Russia	Best Collaborative Pianist	Won	
2015	International Piano Competition Franz Liszt	Italy		Won	
2016	Salieri-Zinetti International Competition	Italy		Won	
2016	Sydney International Piano Competition	Australia	Chamber Music	Fifth	
2017	Orbetello International Piano Competition	Italy		Won	
2019	Khachaturian International Competition	Armenia		Second	
2020	International Piano Competition Luciano Luciani	Italy		Won	
2021	Isidor Bajić Piano Memorial	Serbia		Won	
2022	Verona International Piano Competition	Italy		Won	
