= Alexandra Dariescu =

- Born: 16 August 1985 (age 40); Iași, Romania
- Occupation: Pianist
- Instrument: Piano
- Website: Official site

Alexandra Ioana Dariescu (born 16 August 1985) is a Romanian British classical concert pianist, educator, mentor and producer. She is best known for her multimedia project The Nutcracker and I and her focus on promoting the works of female composers.

== Early life and education ==
Dariescu was born in 1985 in Iași, Romania, and began studying the piano at the age of 7 with Cornelia Apostol and Mihaela Constantin. Her concerto debut was at the age of 9 with the Moldova Philharmonic Orchestra.

At the age of 17, Dariescu won the Constantin Silvestri scholarship which led her to move to the UK to study at Pocklington School. In 2004, she was awarded the Associated Board of the Royal Schools of Music (ABRSM) scholarship for her undergraduate studies at the Royal Northern College of Music. Dariescu made her UK debut at the Bridgewater Hall in 2006, where she performed Mozart Piano Concerto No. 15 with André de Ridder and the RNCM Chamber Orchestra live on BBC Radio 3. She studied under Mark Ray, Nelson Goerner, Alexander Melnikov and Dina Parakhina, graduating in 2008 with 1st class Hons and the Gold Medal. Dariescu has been an RNCM's Honorary Associate Artist since 2016 and their Associated Member since 2020.

In 2008, Dariescu won the Young Concert Artist Trust competition (YCAT). In the same year, Dariescu started her Masters at the Guildhall School of Music and Drama with Ronan O’Hora and became the first pianist on the YCAT/ Royal Philharmonic Society Philip Langridge Mentoring Scheme, mentored by Dame Imogen Cooper. While at the GSMD, Dariescu won the Guildhall Wigmore Prize and graduated with Distinction and a Fellowship. She went back to study at the GSMD in 2016 for a one year course in Creative Entrepreneurship.

Since 2012, Dariescu attended the Verbier Festival Academy several times, studying with Dmitri Bashkirov, Menahem Pressler, Gábor Takács-Nagy and was awarded the Verbier Festival CUBS Award. Dariescu studied with Dominique Merlet at the Academy de Villecroze, Philippe Cassard at the Tibor Varga Academy in Sion, Sir András Schiff in New York, London and Gstaad and Boris Berman at the Holland Music Sessions.

Dariescu has played with orchestras including the BBC Symphony Orchestra, the London Philharmonic Orchestra, the Royal Liverpool Philharmonic, the European Union Youth Orchestra, the Moscow Philharmonic Orchestra, the Orchestre Symphonique de Québec and the Sichuan Symphony Orchestra.

== Professional career ==
=== Performances and repertoire ===
2012 Carnegie Hall recital debut.

2013 First female Romanian pianist to perform at the Royal Albert Hall with Beethoven's Piano Concerto No. 5 and the Royal Philharmonic Orchestra. Debut with the Royal Liverpool Philharmonic Orchestra and Vasily Petrenko with Shostakovich's Piano Concerto No. 2.

2015 Debut at the Concertgebouw, followed by debut in Poland with the Szczecin Philharmonic Orchestra and Ewa Strusinska.

2016 Japan debut at the Musashino Hall. Debut with the Stavanger Symphony Orchestra and John Storgårds in Norway, performing the Norwegian premiere of Alberto Ginastera's Concierto Argentino.

2017 Debut at the Musikverein performing Dinu Lipatti’s Concertino and Grieg's Piano Concerto with the Transylvania State Philharmonic Orchestra and Gabriel Bebeselea. The same year, debuts with the London Philharmonic Orchestra at the Royal Festival Hall (Rachmaninov's Piano Concerto No. 2); National Radio Orchestra of Romania and Cristian Măcelaru; Zuger Sinfonietta and Daniel Huppert (Mozart's Piano Concerto No. 27) and Tampere Philharmonic Orchestra and Michael Francis (Rachmaninov's Rhapsody on a Theme of Paganini). December 2017, premiere of own production of The Nutcracker and I for piano, ballerina and digital animations.

2018 USA, Canada and China tour: Debuts with the Utah Symphony Orchestra and Kazuki Yamada (Grieg's Piano Concerto), Kitchener-Waterloo Symphony and Marzena Diakun (Tchaikovsky's Piano Concerto No.1) and Sichuan Symphony Orchestra under Darrell Ang (Tchaikovsky's No. 1). The same year, first performance with Romanian soprano Angela Gheorghiu at the Vienna State Opera.

2019 Debuts with the BBC Symphony Orchestra and James Gaffigan (Nadia Boulanger’s Fantaisie at the Barbican Hall, broadcast live on BBC Radio 3); Orchestre National de France and Ion Marin (Ravel's Piano Concerto in G major); UK tour with the Moscow Philharmonic and Yuri Simonov (Rachmaninov's No. 2 and Tchaikovsky's No. 1); Tonkünstler Orchestra and Ruth Reinhardt (Ferdinand Ries' Piano Concerto No. 3). The Nutcracker and I performances at the Verbier Festival.

2020 Before the pandemic, debuts with the Sydney Symphony Orchestra and Jun Märkl (Ravel's G major); Melbourne Symphony Orchestra and Alexander Shelley (Grieg's Piano Concerto); Auckland Philharmonia Orchestra and Giordano Bellicampi (Tchaikovsky's No. 1); Berlin State Opera recital with Angela Gheorghiu. Norwegian Nadia Boulanger premiere with the Oslo Philharmonic and Fabien Gabel. Premiere of The Nutcracker - Reimagined with the Royal Liverpool Philharmonic, a new production for piano, narrator, brass and dancers.

=== The Nutcracker and I by Alexandra Dariescu for piano, ballerina & digital animation ===
The Nutcracker and I is a multimedia performance for piano solo with dance and digital animation which Dariescu created and produced out of her "responsibility as a young artist to reach out to as many people as possible and to build bridges for those new to classical music". The Nutcracker and I premiered at Barbican’s Milton Court in December 2017 and went on tour across Europe, Australia, China, the Emirates and the US with more than 75 performances in venues such as the Vienna Konzerthaus, Laeiszhalle Hamburg, Philharmonie Luxembourg, Auditorium Lyon, Verbier Festival, Konserthuset Gothenburg, King’s Place London, Melbourne Recital Hall, Sydney City Recital Hall, Royal Liverpool Philharmonic, Shanghai Grand Theatre, Dubai Opera House and Las Vegas Summerlin Library. The Nutcracker and I reached more than 70,000 people worldwide through the live performances and the 2018 released audio book of the same name, narrated by former BBC Blue Peter presenter and BAFTA winner, Lindsey Russell. In 2019, The Nutcracker and I was shortlisted for the German Opus Klassik Awards in the youth development category, alongside nine nominees including projects by Daniel Barenboim, Lang Lang and Anne-Sophie Mutter.

== Mentoring and teaching ==
Dariescu is a mentor and teacher, having given masterclasses and lessons in the UK, Switzerland, Germany, Romania, Japan, China, South Africa and Canada

She regularly speaks at conferences and sits on juries and panels:

2021: Awarded with the Order “Cultural Merit” in the rank of Knight from the President of Romania, Klaus Iohannis

2021: Trinity Laban Conservatoire of Music & Dance: Jury member Alfred Kitchin Competition and Concerto Competition

2021: Royal Over-Seas League: Jury member Annual Music Competition

2020—present: Beyond Borders (sessions on leadership, collaboration and orchestras’ relevance to society, through the eyes of a conductor)

2019: University of Liverpool: Speaker - Women in Music

2018—present: Friends of Europe - Young European Leader, Arts and Culture (Working Group Member)

2018: Classical:NEXT Conference in Rotterdam (Netherlands): Speaker

2018: GSMD's Reflective Conservatoire Conference: Speaker Artists as citizens - Role of musicians in today’s world and how to incorporate multimedia in performances

2018: Received the “Officer of the Romanian Crown” from the Romanian Royal Family

2017: Music in Lyddington: Patron

2017: Royal Northern College of Music: Jury member Concerto Competition Finals

2016: Transylvania Festival: Director of Music and Board Member

2016: Young Concert Artists Trust: Speaker - Building networks in classical music

2016—present: Royal Northern College of Music: Honorary Associate Artist

2014—present: Margareta of Romania Royal Foundation: Foundation Ambassador

== Discography ==
2024 Grieg and Clara Schumann Piano Concertos. Alexandra Dariescu, Philarmonia Orchestra & Tianyi Lu. https://classical.music.apple.com/au/album/1751268500?i=1751268502&l=en-AU

2019 Plaisir d'Amour. Angela Gheorghiu & Alexandra Dariescu. Decca Classics

2019 Complete Preludes, Vol. 3 Boulanger, Fauré & Messiaen. Champs Hill Records

2018 The Nutcracker and I, by Alexandra Dariescu audiobook. Signum Classics

2016 Emily Howard Mesmerism for piano & orchestra / Royal Liverpool Philharmonic Orchestra. NMC Records

2016 Tchaikovsky Piano Concerto No. 1 / Nutcracker Suite with Royal Philharmonic Orchestra. Signum Classics

2015 Complete Preludes, Vol. 2 Shostakovich & Szymanowski. Champs Hill Records

2013 Complete Preludes, Vol. 1 Chopin & Dutilleux. Champs Hill Records

2012 Chopin, Schumann and Liszt. Champs Hill Records

== External Link ==
- Interview with Alexandra Dariescu, 2020 (german)
