= Christoph Croisé =

French-German-Swiss cellist and composer

Christoph Raphael Friedwart Croisé (born 3 December 1993 in Filderstadt/Germany but raised in Niederlenz/Switzerland) is a French-German-Swiss cellist and composer.

== Life and career ==
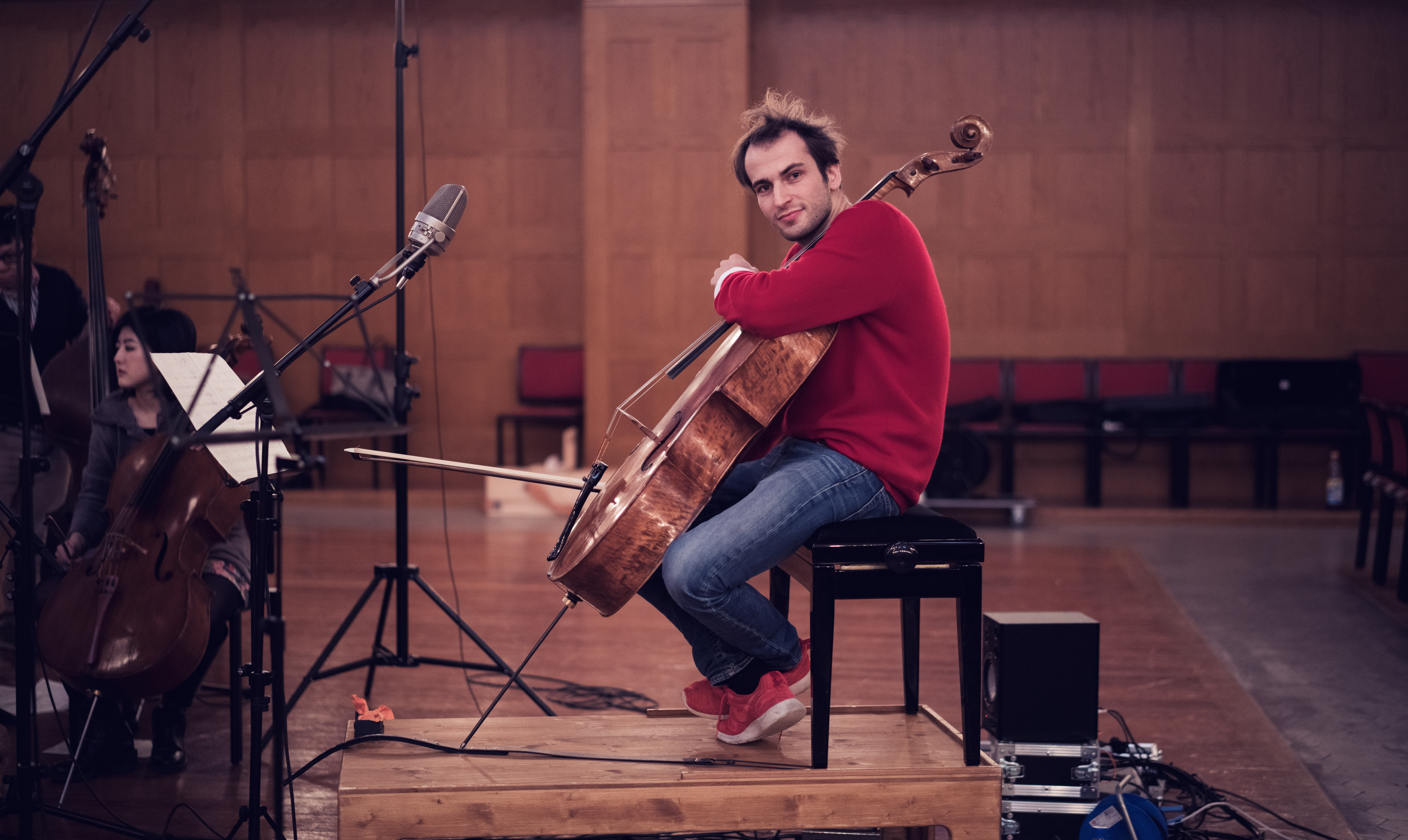
Christoph Croisé during a CD recording, Church Oberstrass, Zurich/Switzerland, November 2017

Christoph Croisé had his first Cello lessons at the age of seven with Katharina Kühne. At the age of 14, he was taught and guided by Alexander Neustroev, a Solo-Cellist at Zurich's Tonhalle and started to attend various master classes. At 20 years old he moved to Berlin to study with Wolfgang-Emanuel Schmidt at Berlin University of Arts. He has since benefitted from the advice of Steven Isserlis, Michael Sanderling, David Geringas, Walter Grimmer, and Frans Helmerson.

At the age of 17, Christoph made his debut at Carnegie Hall in New York City after having won the IBLA Foundation Grand Prize, which included a concert tour through the United States.

His debut album with Oxana Shevchenko was released in May 2015 on Quartz Classics. His second album "Summer Night", including Othmar Schoeck's cello concerto, was released in February 2018 on GENUIN classics. His third album (Haydn, Vivaldi Cello Concertos) was released in March 2019 on AVIE Records and won the Supersonic Award from the Pizzicato Magazine and the „Clef D’Or“ for the best concerto album of 2019 from the ResMusica Magazine. His fourth CD "The Russian Album" was released on November 1, 2019, on AVIE Records.

== Performances ==
As a soloist, he has appeared under the batons of conductors including M. Sanderling, M. Venzago, D. Boyd, L. Gendre, K. Griffiths, D. Reiland, A. Guliyev, A. Ardal, M. Dones and D. Botinis, with various orchestras including the Musikkollegium Winterthur, the St. Petersburg Symphony Orchestra, the Bern Symphony Orchestra, the State Symphony Orchestra Baku/Azerbaijan, the Camerata Zurich, the Munich Radio Orchestra, the Camerata Switzerland, the Southwest German Philharmonic Orchestra of Constance, the State Symphony Orchestra, St. Petersburg, the Collegium Musicum Basel, the Orchestre symphonique de Mulhouse, the Radio Symphony Orchestra, Tirana, the Sinfonietta de Lausanne, the Sichuan Symphony Orchestra, the Saint Petersburg Academic Symphony Orchestra, the Bavarian Philharmonic Chamber Orchestra, the Izmir State Symphony Orchestra, the Orquesta Sinfonica de Michoacan, the Harbin Symphony Orchestra and the Philharmonic Orchestra Budejovice.

Christoph Croisé has been invited to perform at festivals including the Festival "Musical Olympus" in St. Petersburg, New York, and Baku, the Lucerne Festival, the Davos Festival "Young Artists in Concert", the Menuhin Festival Gstaad, the Salzkammergut Festwochen Gmunden, the Radio France Festival Montpellier, the Schwarzwald Music Festival, the Festival de Sully, the Belfast International Arts Festival, the Emilia-Romagna Festival and the Festival de Musique de Wissembourg. As a chamber musician, he has performed with Dmitri Sitkovetsky, Mayuko Kamio, Isabelle van Keulen, Andrey Baranov, Sergey Ostrovsky, Kirill Troussov, Alexander Zemtsov, Vladimir Mendelssohn, Marie Chilemme, Christoffer Sundqvist, Anna Fedorova, Bartłomiej Nizioł, Oliver Schnyder, Oxana Shevchenko, Nikita Mndoyants, Lorenzo Soulès, and Alexander Panfilov.

Several of his concerts have been broadcast live on radio and television by the Bavarian Radio, the Norddeutsche Rundfunk, the WQXR, the BBC 3, the SRF, the RTS, the RSI, the WMFT and others.

== Instrument ==
Christoph Croisé plays on a rare Italian master cello, crafted in 1680.

== Awards ==
- 2009: 1st Prize International Competition "Petar Konjovic", Belgrade
- 2010: 1st Prize International Competition "IBLA Grand Prize", Sicily, Italy
- 2015: 1st Prize International Johannes Brahms Competition, cello section
- 2015: Stipendiary at the Migros Kulturprozent Competition
- 2016: 3rd Prize International Competition "Debut at the Berlin Philharmonic Hall"
- 2016: 1st Prize International Manhattan Music Competition
- 2016: 1st Prize Schoenfeld International String Competition, Harbin, China.
- 2016: 3rd Prize International Carlos Prieto Competition, Morelia, Mexico
- 2016: 1st Prize Salieri-Zinetti Competition, Verona, Italy.
- 2016: Stipendiary at the Migros Kulturprozent Competition and included in the Concert Agency of the Migros Kulturprozent
- 2017: Golden Medal "First Berliner International Music Competition"
- 2017: Swiss Ambassadors Award
- 2018: First Grand Prize "2nd Berliner International Music Competition"
- 2018: "Prix Jeune Soliste des Médias Francophones Publics 2019"
