= Interpreti Veneziani =

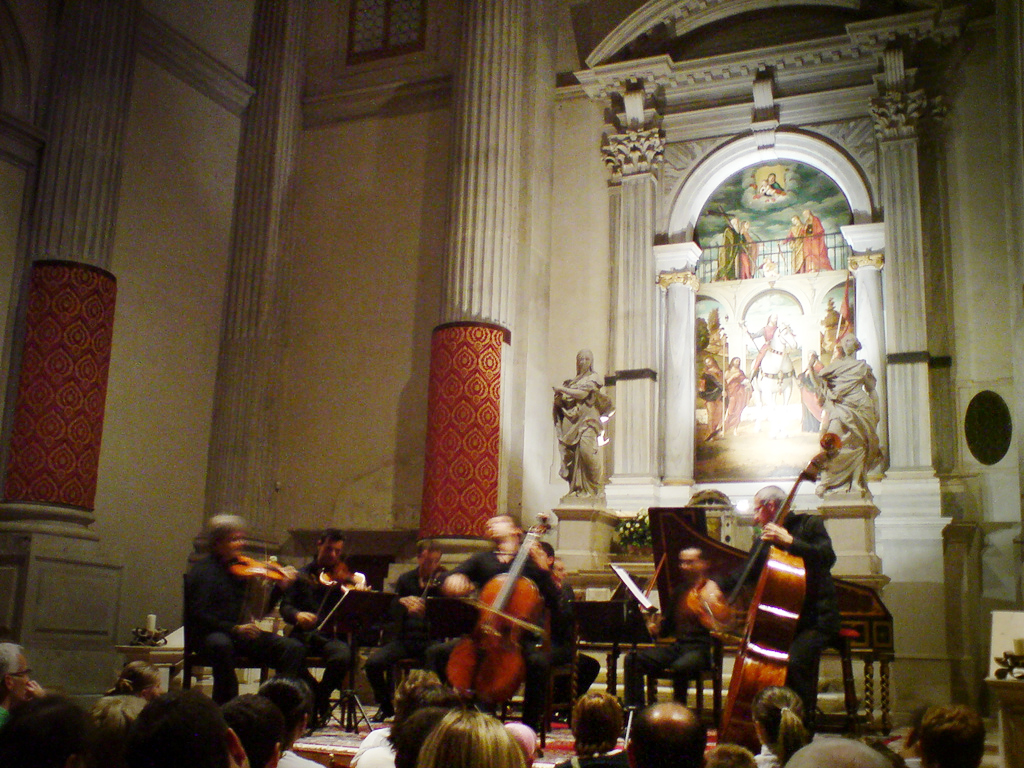
Concert by the musical ensemble Interpreti Veneziani at San Vidal in Venice.

Interpreti Veneziani is a Venice-based musical ensemble that performs Vivaldi, Bach, and other Baroque composers. The group was founded in 1987 and now plays in concerts and music festivals throughout the world.

== History and concerts ==
Interpreti Veneziani often play nightly concerts in the San Vidal Church in Venice, for which they are well known. The group performs 200–350 concerts each year, and are seen by 60,000 patrons each year in San Vidal.

Interpreti Veneziani has played in Melbourne Australia, Bayreuth Germany, at the Stockholm Royal Palace, in the Kirov theatre in St. Petersburg Russia, Canada, and has toured throughout Japan, the United States and South America.

As of 2011, the group had made 18 recordings. Their repertoire includes Baroque, Classical and Modern music, though they specialize in Baroque music and Vivaldi's music in particular.

== Museum of Music ==
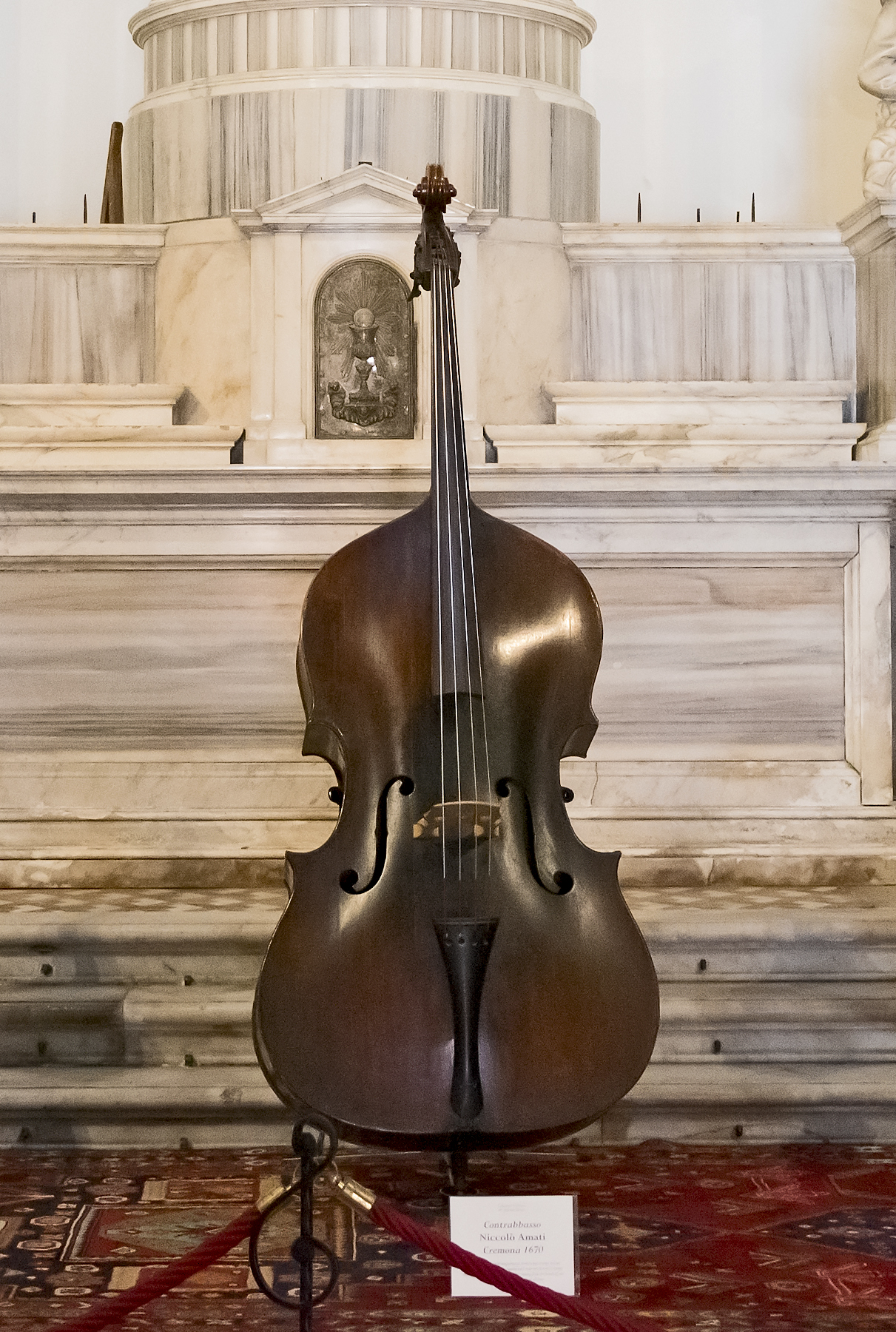
Bass by Niccolò Amati, made in 1670, and housed at the Museum of Music in San Maurizio, Venice.

Interpreti Veneziani founded the Italian Museo della Musica (Museum of Music) in the Venice Church of San Maurizio, dedicated to 500 years of Italian violin making.

== Reception ==
The group is described by Rick Steves to be "considered the best group" in Venice; their performances have been described as "youthful" and "exuberant."

== See also ==
- Antonio Vivaldi
