= San Maurizio, Venice =

Church in Venice, Italy

San Maurizio
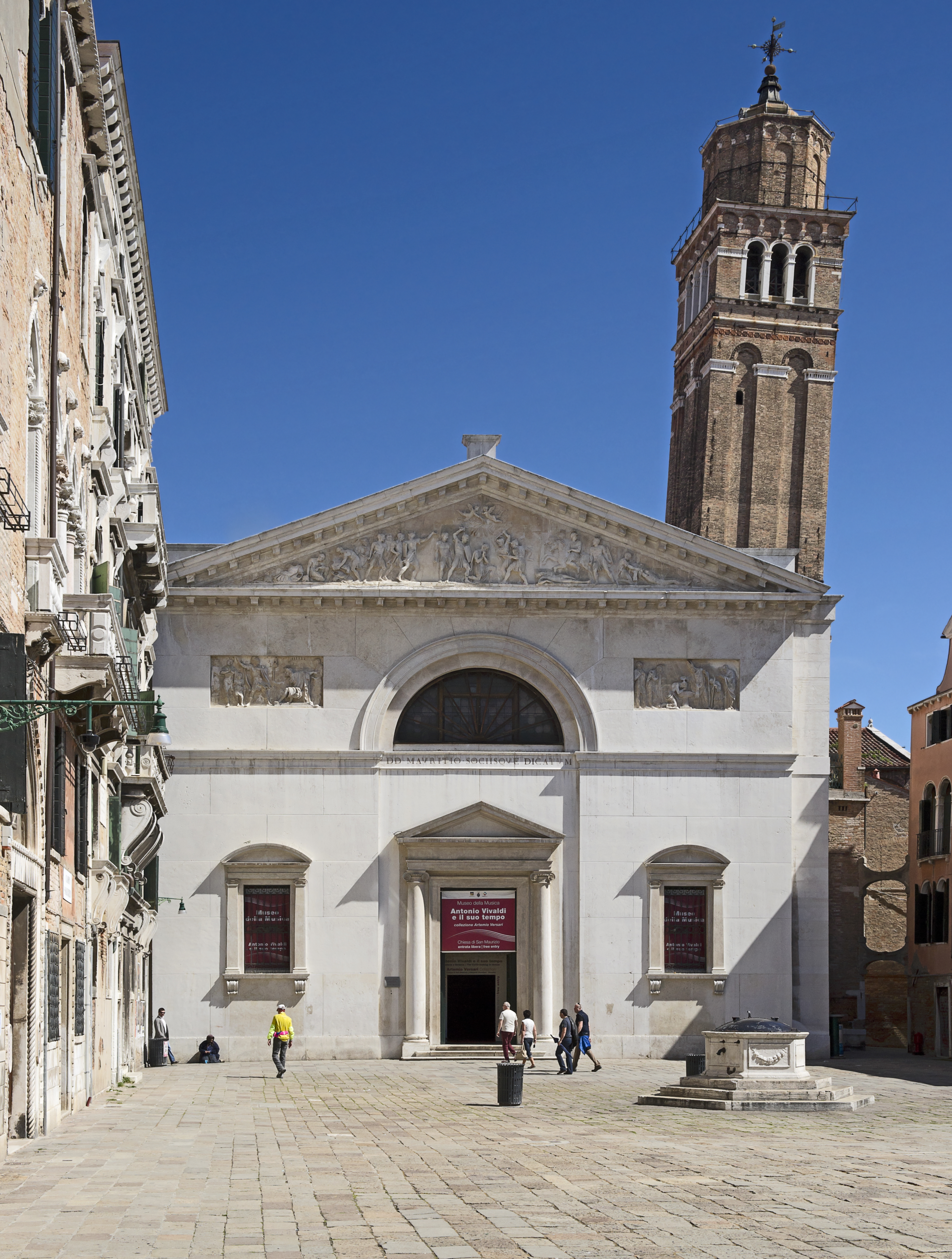

- Location within Venice Location within Italy

Religion
- Affiliation: Roman Catholic
- Province: Venice

Location
- Location: Venice, Italy
- Interactive map of San Maurizio
- Coordinates: 45°25′59″N 12°19′54″E

San Maurizio is a Neoclassical-style, deconsecrated church located in the campo San Maurizio in the sestiere of San Marco of the city of Venice, Italy. It now is a Museum focusing on the music of Baroque Venice.

A church was present at the site before the first reconstruction in the 16th century. A further reconstruction took place in 1806 by the La Fenice's architect Giannantonio Selva. It once housed a studio of a young Antonio Canova. Near the church was built the scuola degli Albanesi. The present structure is mainly a design of the Neoclassic architect Giovanni Antonio Selva.

The church now houses the Museo della Musica, museum of baroque instruments, composers, and music of Venice. It features period instruments, and documents, including exhibits on Antonio Vivaldi, but also documents on Amati, Giovanni Battista Guadagnini, and Francesco and Matteo Goffriller. Entrance, as of 2020, is free.

== Exterior ==
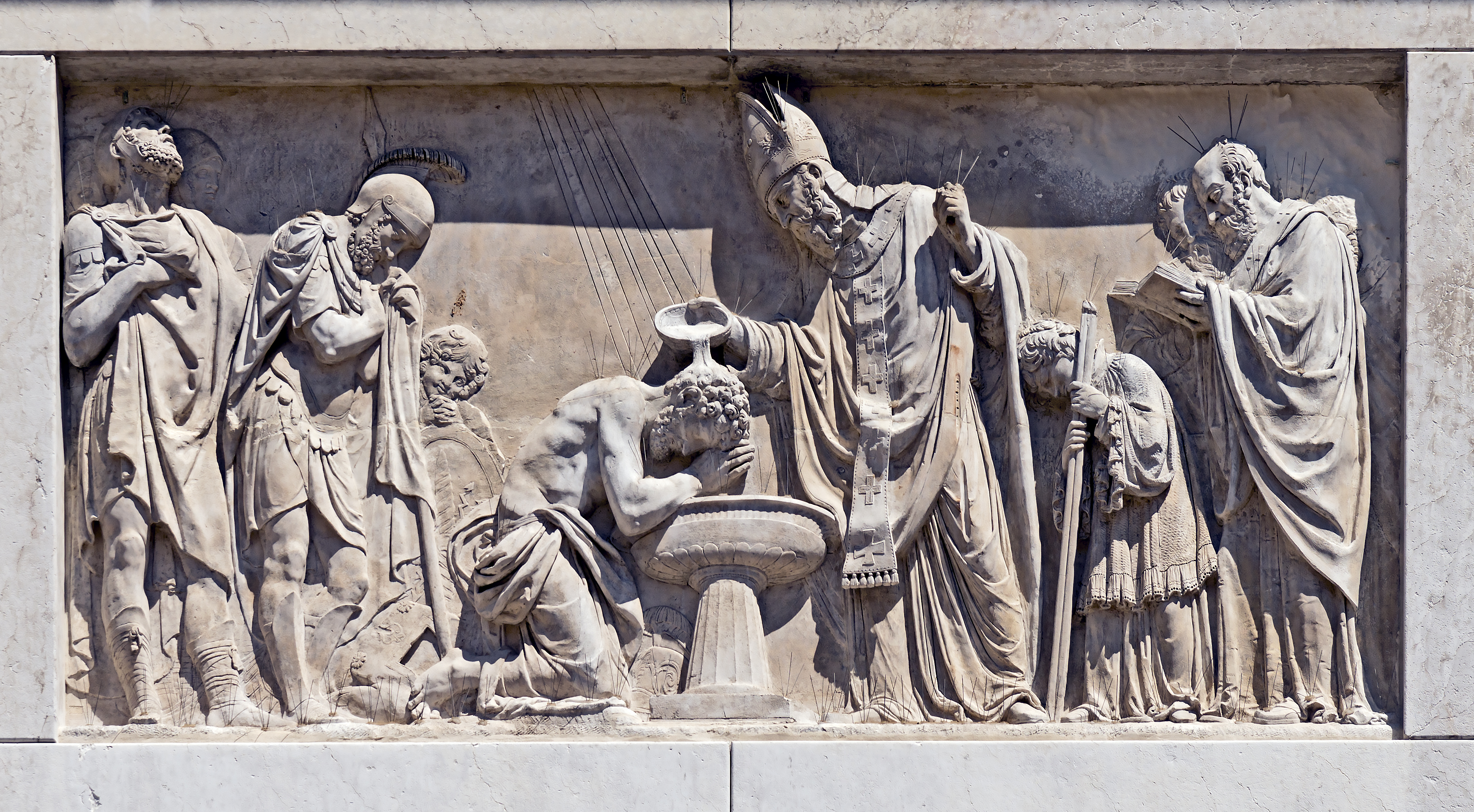
Bas-relief on the facade right, by Bartolomeo Ferrari.

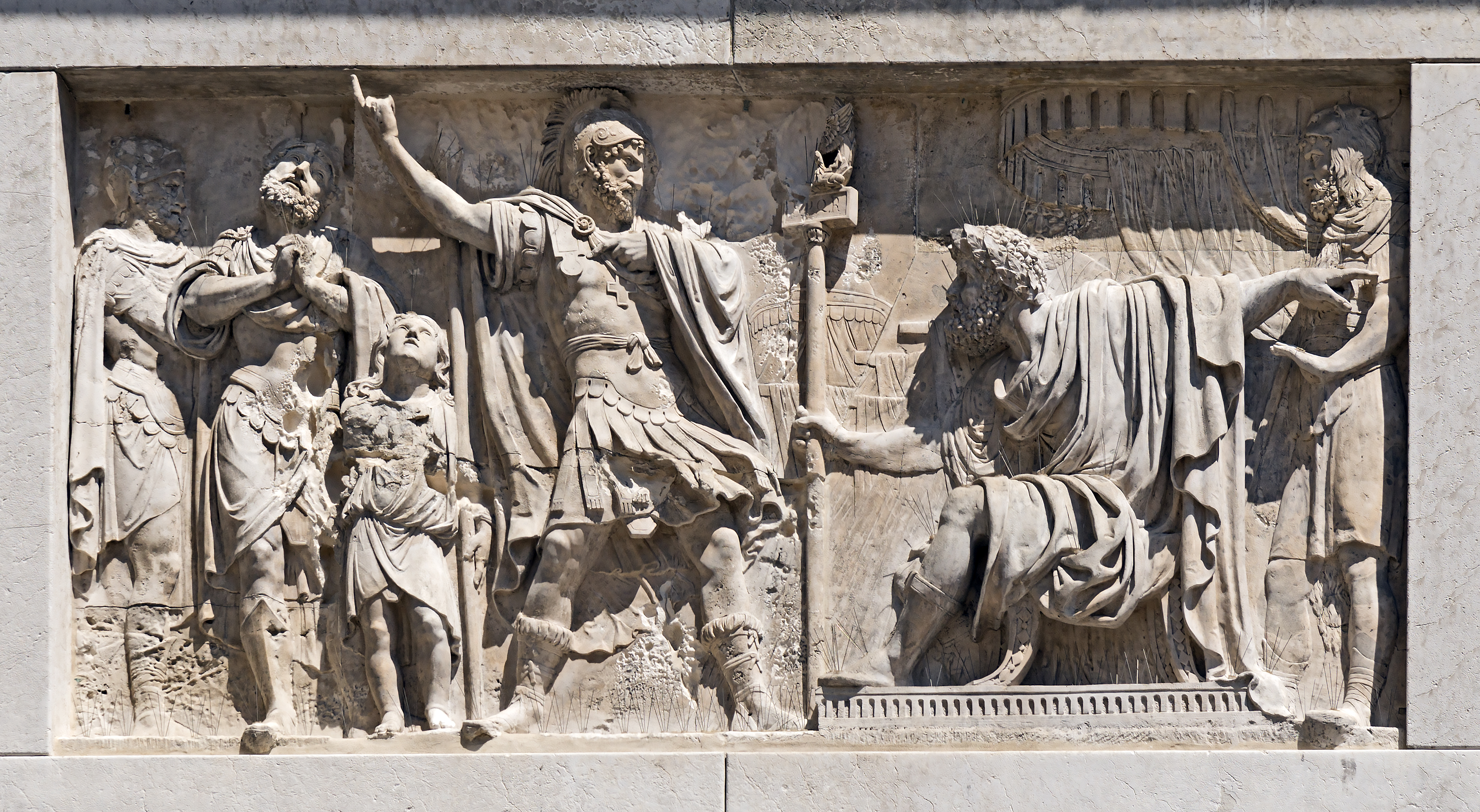
Bas-relief on the facade left, by Bartolomeo Ferrari.

== Interior ==
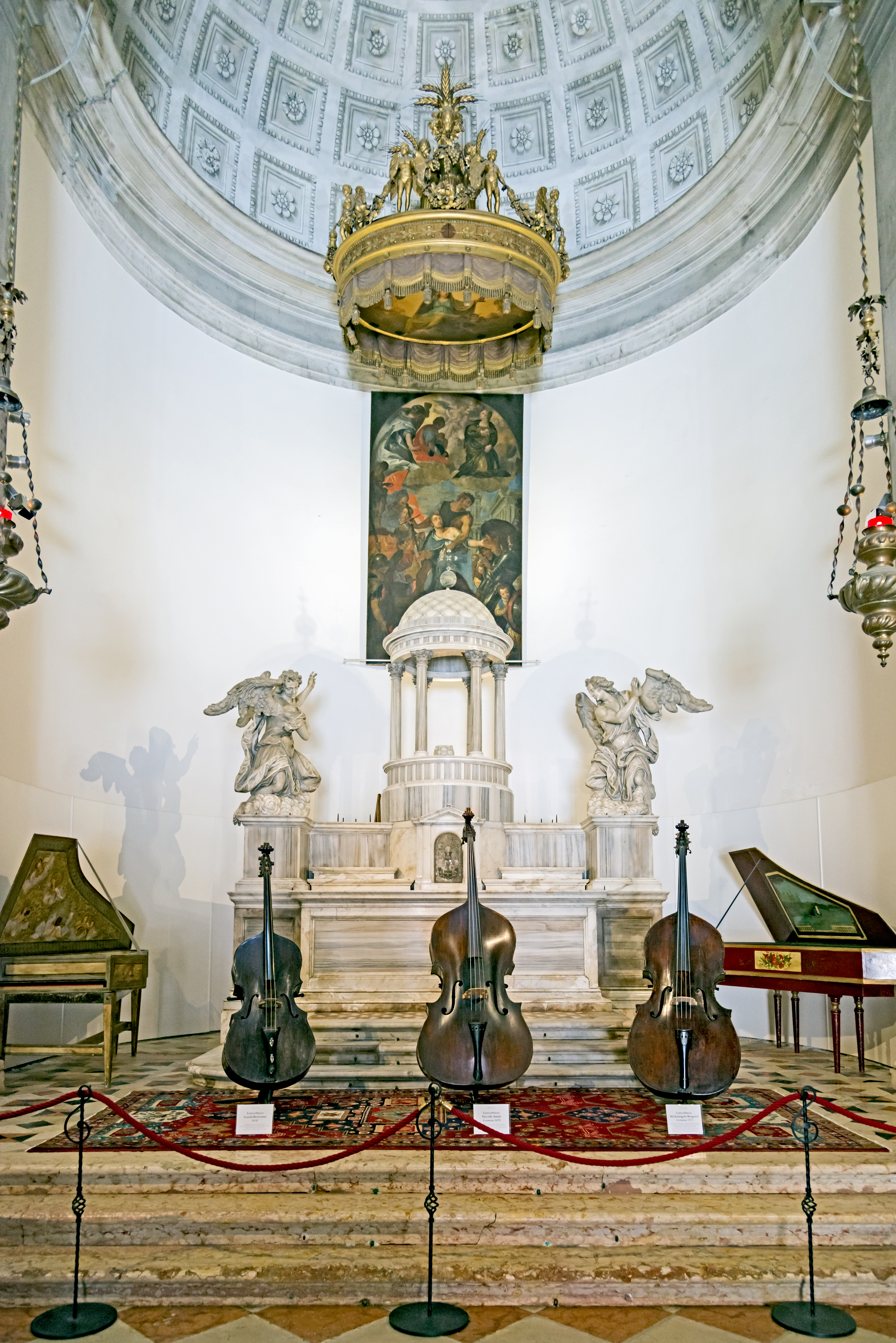
High altar

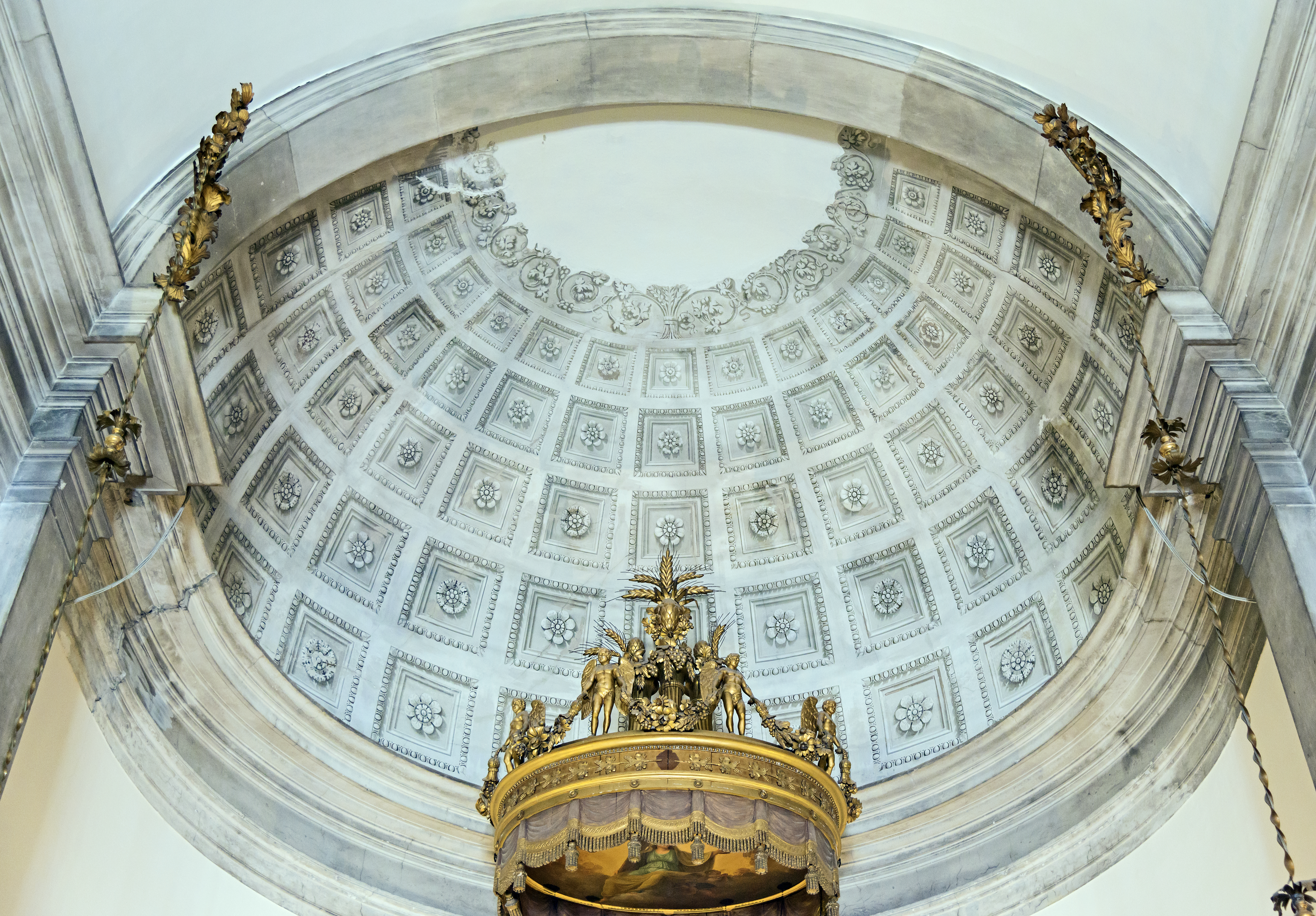
The ceiling of the vault of the choir.

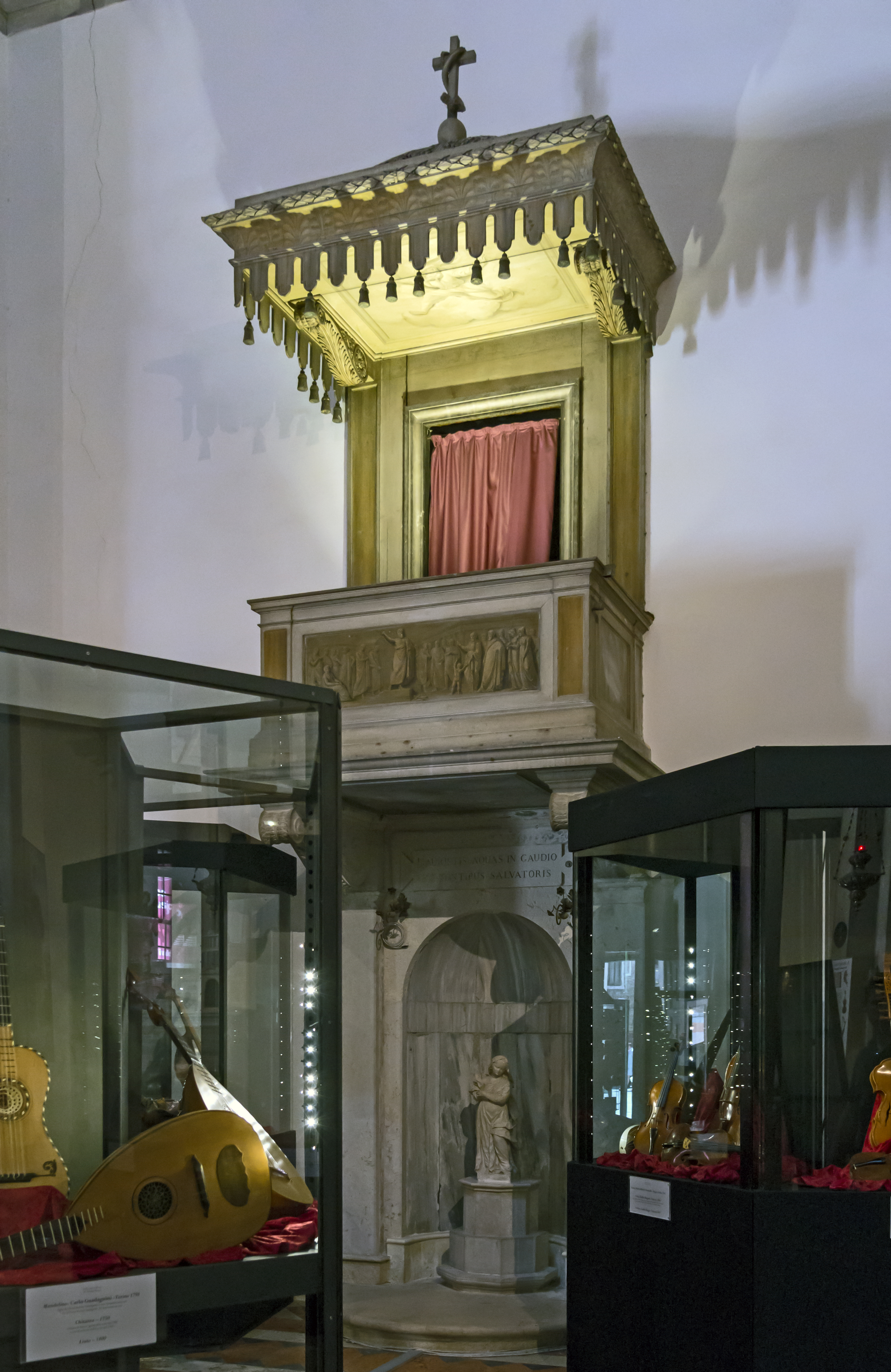
Pulpit

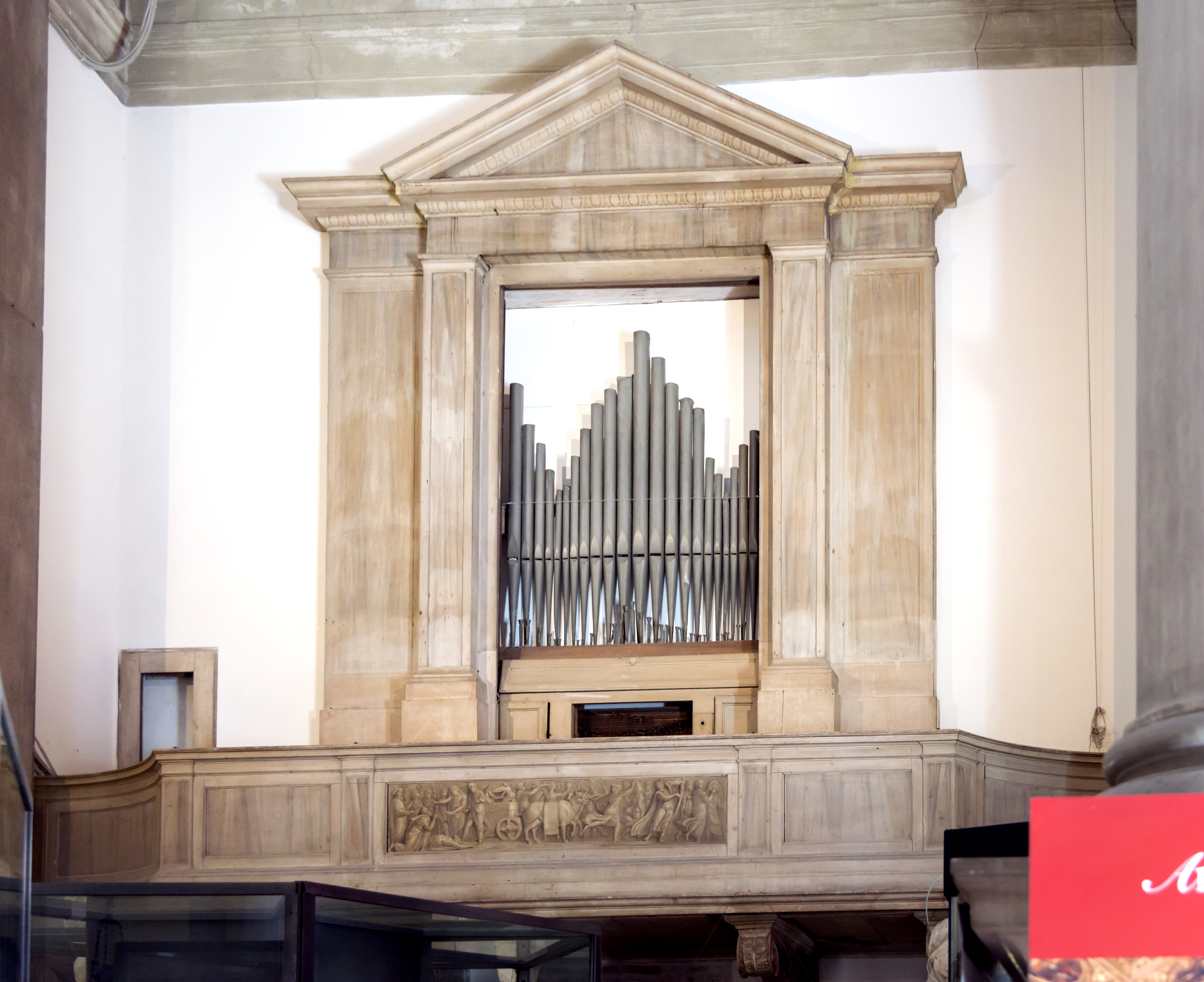
Organo

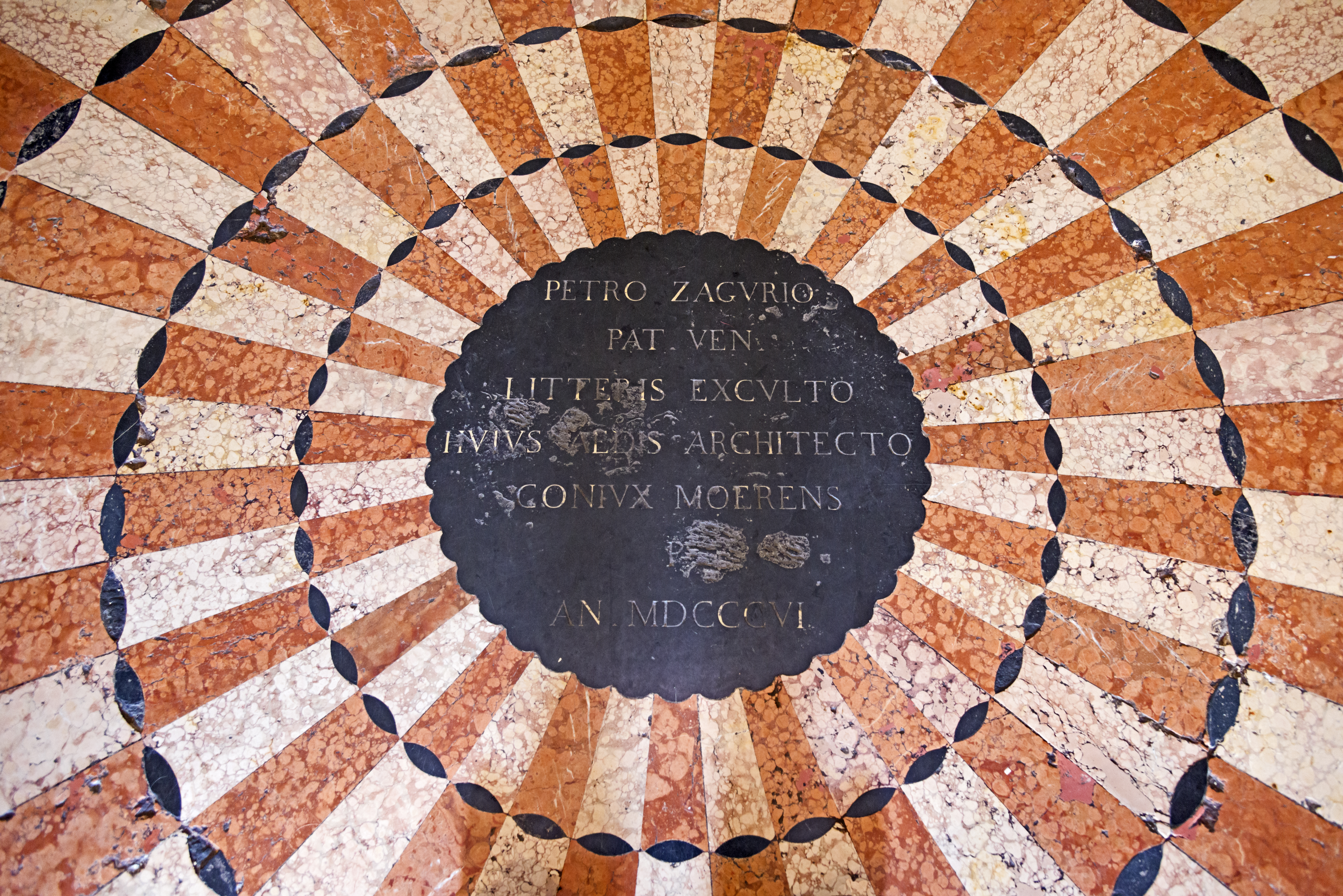
Tomb of "Pietro Antonio Zaguri" in the center of the nave.

=== Museo della Musica ===
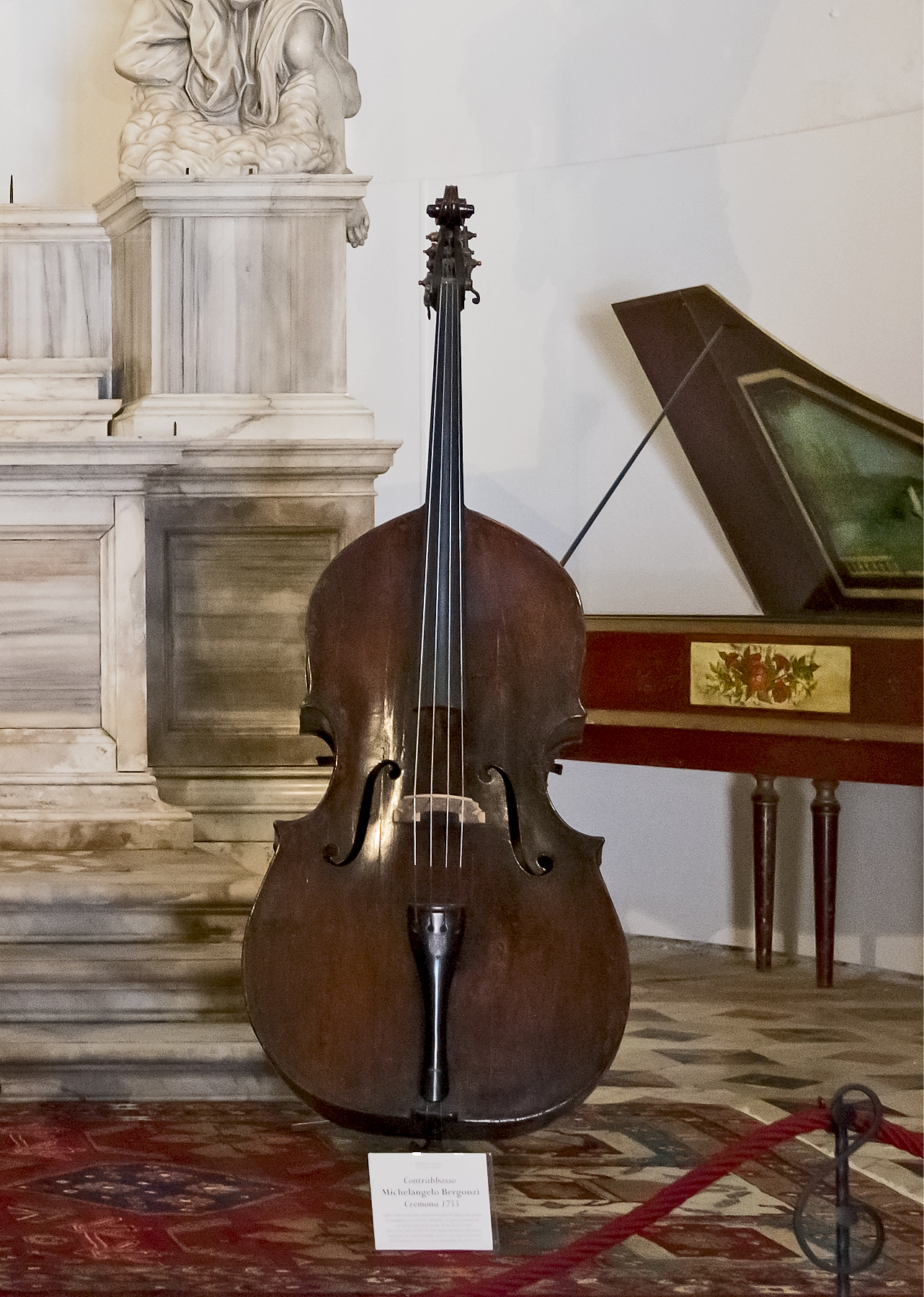
Bass by Carlo Bergonzi

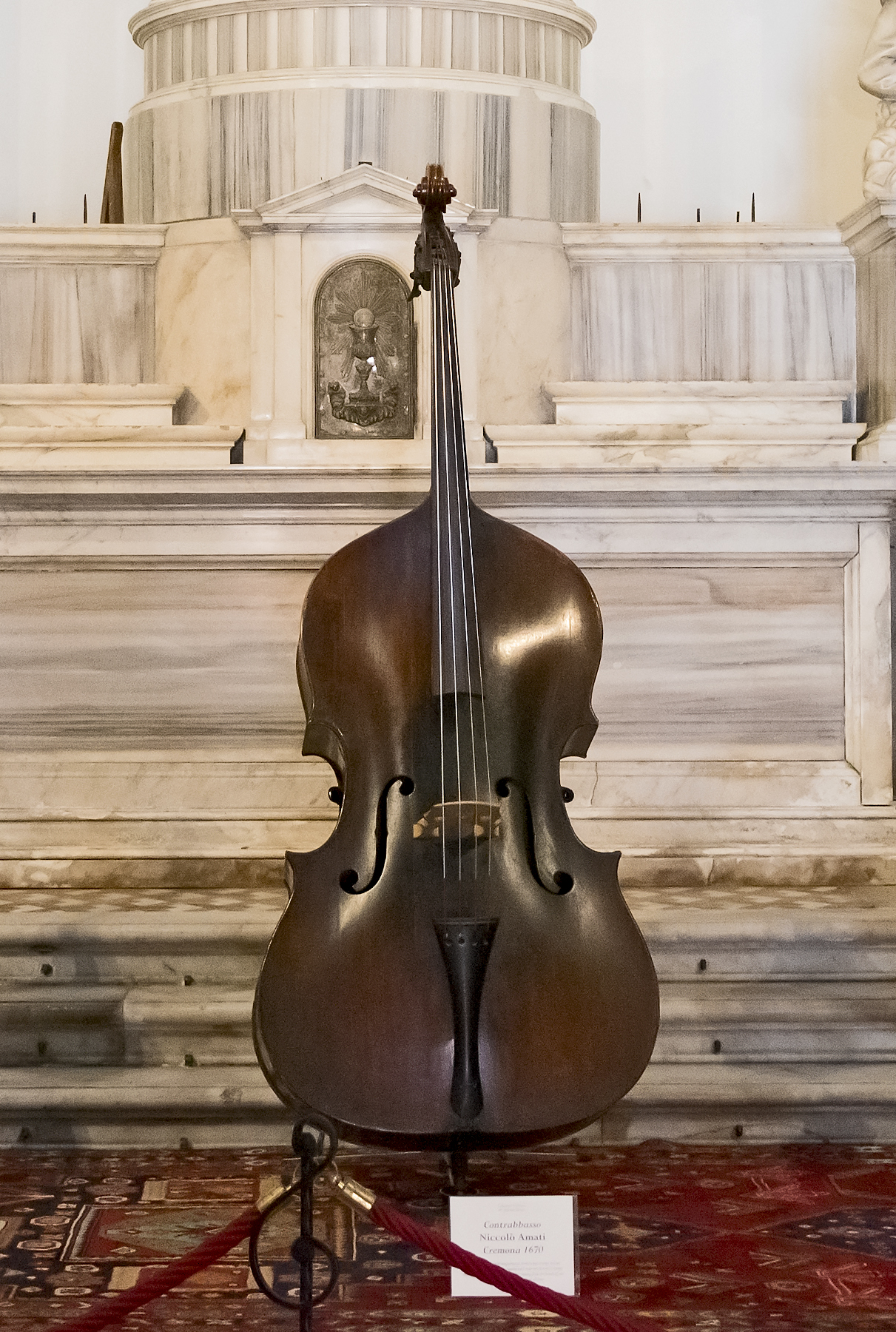
Bass by Niccolò Amati

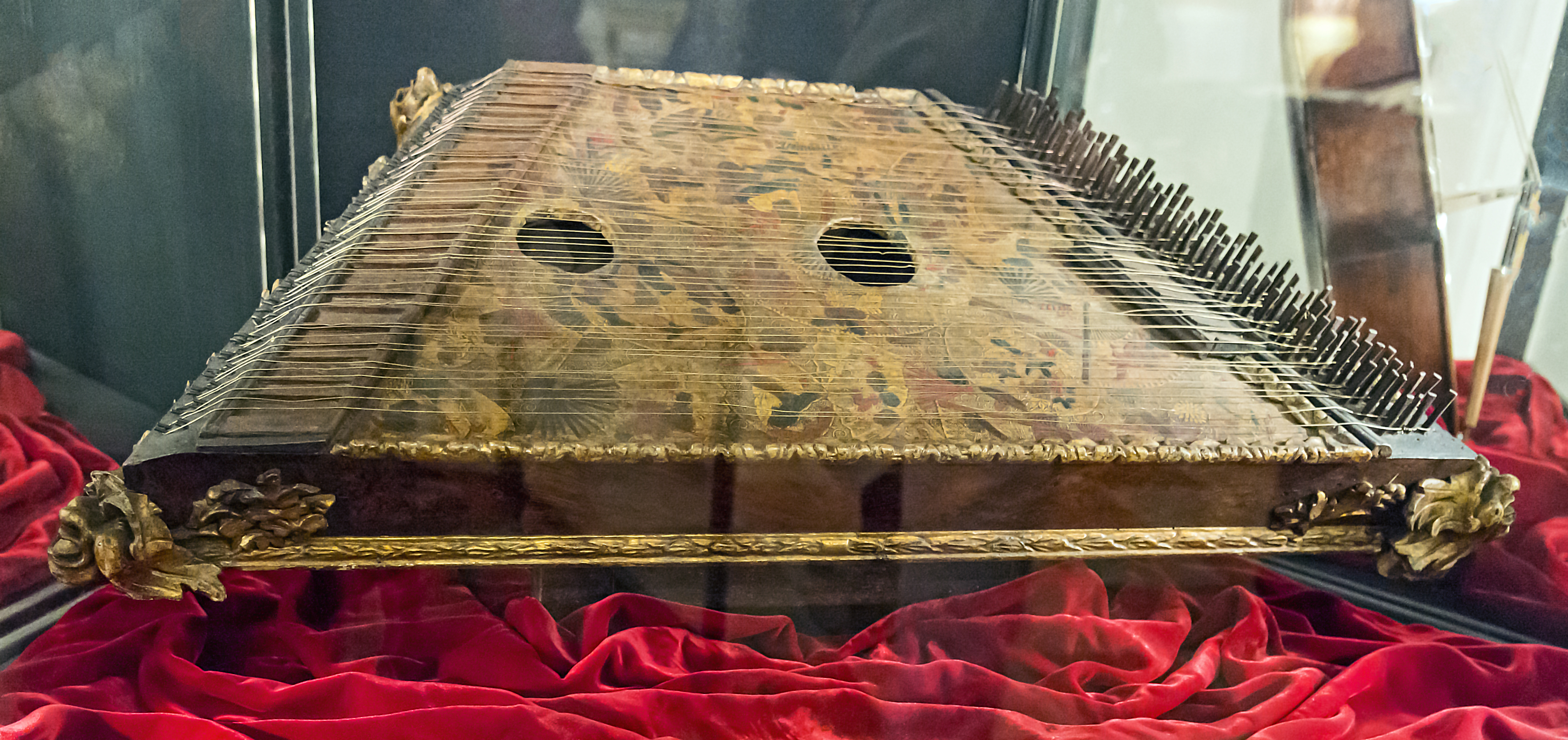
Psaltery Venetian School 1700

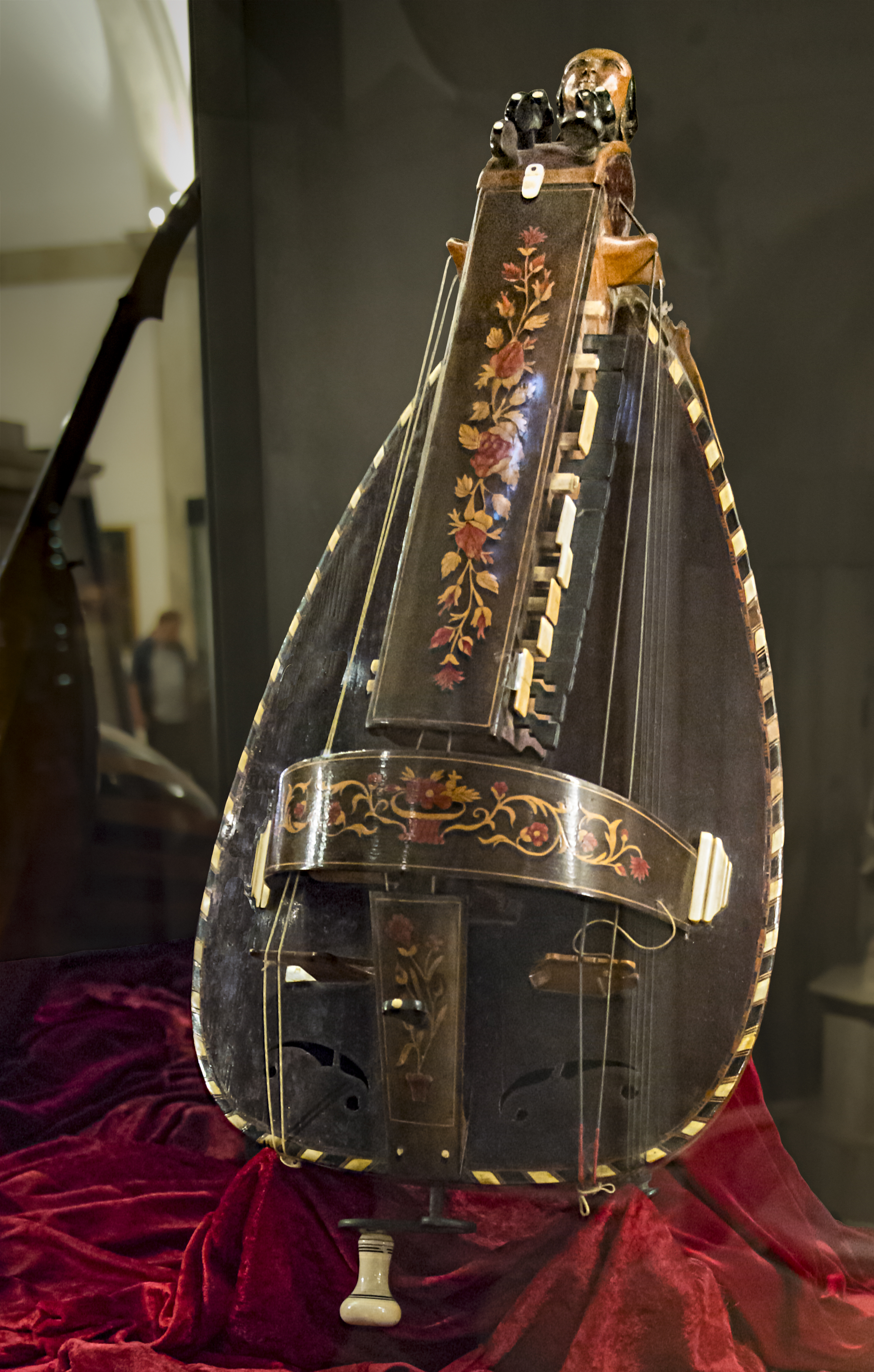
Hurdy-gurdy French school 1850

== See also ==
- List of music museums
