= Scottish International Piano Competition =

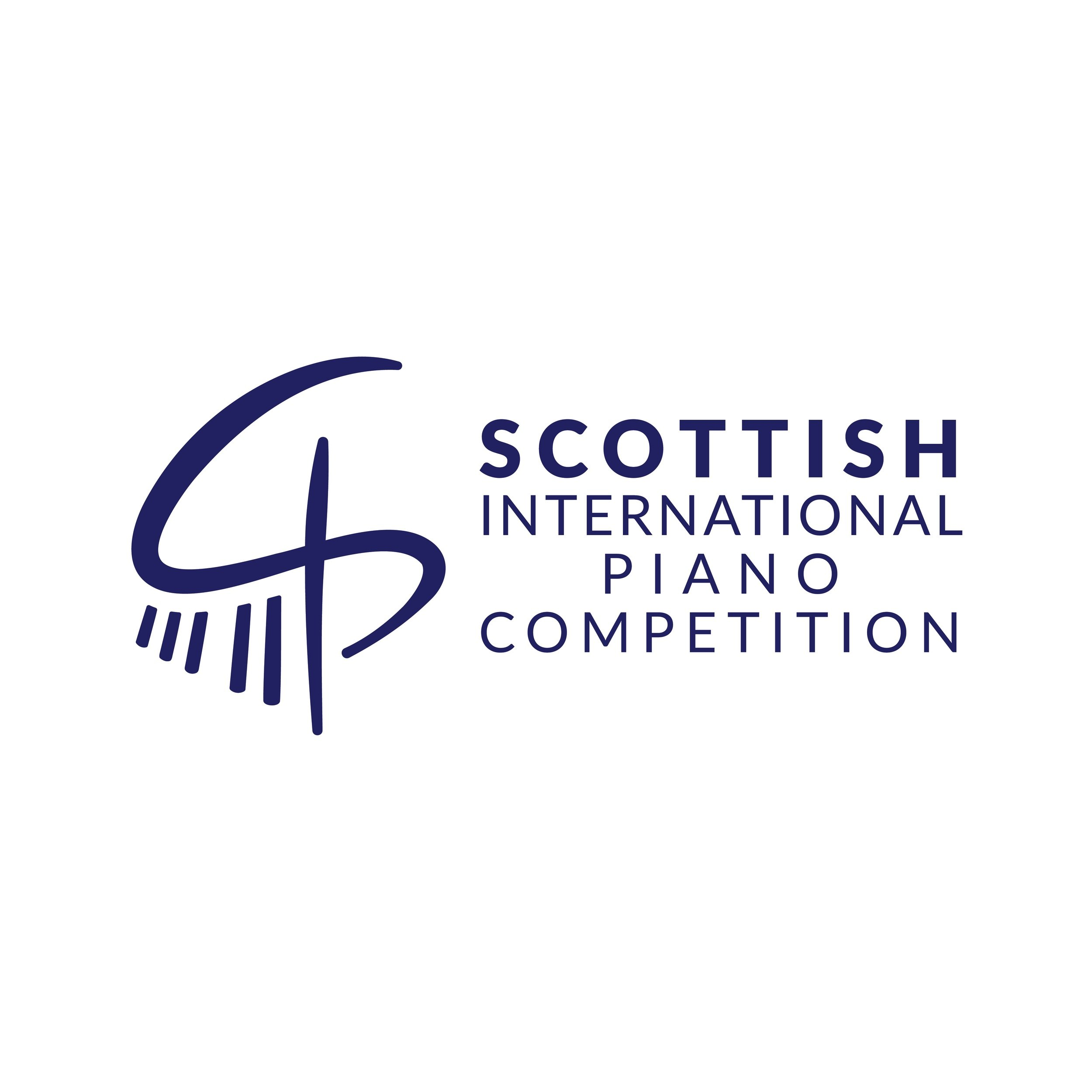
- Formation: 1986; 40 years ago
- Type: Registered charity
- CEO: Edward Cohen
- Chair of the Board: Liz Cameron
- Artistic Director: Aaron Shorr
- Website: www.scotpianocomp.com

The Scottish International Piano Competition is a classical piano competition established in 1986, and taking place every three years in Glasgow, UK. The competition is open to pianists of any nationality aged between 18 and 30. Winners are awarded a £15,000 prize on top of the prestigious title. Previous winners include Sergei Babayan (1992), Alexander Kobrin (1998), Chenyin Li (2001), Tanya Gabrielian (2004) and Oxana Shevchenko (2010). Further editions of the competition were held in 2014, when the first prize was awarded to Jonathan Fournel, and 2017, when the winner was Can Çakmur.

Steven Osborne became the Patron of the Competition in 2024.

== 2023 competition ==
After being cancelled in 2020 due to the COVID-19 pandemic, the competition resumed in September 2023, following a slightly different format: influenced by the online shift of many activities during the pandemic, and to reduce the competition's carbon footprint, all 216 entrants first had to submit a 40-minute videoed programme, 30 of whom were then selected to take part in the competition in Glasgow.

Preliminary stages recitals were held in the Royal Conservatoire of Scotland, while the final, for which the last three participants had to play a concerto with the Royal Scottish National Orchestra, took place in the Glasgow Royal Concert Hall.

Jonathan Mamora was awarded 1st Prize and the Prize for the Best Performance of the Compulsory Work (David A T Önaç's Five Études), while Yilei Hao and Yonggi Woo took home a joint 2nd Prize.
