= Li Chenyin =

Chinese pianist

Chenyin Li (born 1977) is a Chinese pianist.

== Life and work ==
Chenyin Li studied at the Beijing Conservatory with Bigang Chen, Zhong Hui, and Hui-li Li.

As a child, she won national and international piano competitions, performed in concerts, and made radio recordings. From 1995 to 1998, she studied with Tamás Vesmás at the University of Auckland in New Zealand. During this time, she won the New Zealand National Piano Competition and the Young Musician of the Year Competition and performed with the New Zealand Symphony Orchestra on radio and television.

From 1998, she studied at the Guildhall School of Music and Drama in London with Joan Havill, where she earned her concert diploma. She won numerous European piano competitions, including the Scottish International Piano Competition in 2001. Following her debut concert in 2002 at the Royal Festival Hall, she has performed in France, Italy, Germany, Spain, the Netherlands, Japan, and the USA, among other countries.

She is a Distinguished Professor at the University of the Chinese Academy of Sciences (UCAS). In October 2025 she was a judge at the Wales International Piano Festival.
