= International Johannes Brahms Competition =

The International Johannes Brahms Competition ("Brahms Competition") is an international competition for the performers of piano, violin, viola, cello, chamber music, and singers.

In each category, competitors are obliged to perform works composed by Brahms, either in the preliminary or final round.

== History ==
The competition has taken place annually since 1993. The event is held in Pörtschach am Wörthersee, Austria, where Johannes Brahms occasionally stayed during the summer.

No competition was held in 2022, due to the Covid pandemic. In 2025, management of the Brahms Competition passed from Waltraud Arnold and her team to the direction of Dr. Johannes Kropfitsch; that year, no competition was held.

== Prize winners ==
Year	Competition	1st prize	2nd prize	3rd prize	Ref
2001	Violin	Ganna Stepanenko (Ukraine)	Ge Song (China)	Georgi Jaschwili (Georgia)	2001; winners for 2001-2005 and 2006-2010 are given at the official website
2001	Viola	Yoko Kanamaru (Japan); Alexander Zemtsov (Russia)		Mihoko Kusama (Japan)	2001; winners for 2001-2005 and 2006-2010 are given at the official website
2001	Cello	Gabriel Faur (Romania)	Christian Hick (Germany)	Katarzyna Gorska (Poland)	2001; winners for 2001-2005 and 2006-2010 are given at the official website
2001	Piano	Mariko Onishi (Japan)	Jeanne You (South Korea)	Olga Sevidova (Russia)	2001; winners for 2001-2005 and 2006-2010 are given at the official website
2001	Voice	Daniel Sans (Germany)	René Perler (Switzerland)	Nozomi Mineshima (Japan)	2001; winners for 2001-2005 and 2006-2010 are given at the official website
2001	Chamber music	Schwarzrock/Kipp/Troe (Germany)	"Dali Piano Quartet" A. Mozgiel, R. Kwiatkowski, L. Lisowski, W. Jasman (Poland)	Yoshizawa/Hedenborg (Japan/Austria)	2001; winners for 2001-2005 and 2006-2010 are given at the official website
2010	Piano	Nao Yuki (Japan)	Osman Ozgur Unaldi (Turkey)	Natalia Rehling (Poland)	Winners for 2011-2015 are listed at the competition website
2010	Chamber music	Pescatori Trio	GuRu Duo	Piano Quartett "Anno Domini"	Winners for 2011-2015 are listed at the competition website
2010	Violin	Thomas Reif (Germany)	Lukas Stepp (Germany)	Martin Funda (Germany)	Winners for 2011-2015 are listed at the competition website
2010	Viola	Hwa Yoon Lee (South Korea); Lydia Rinecker (Germany)		Wenting Kang (China)	Winners for 2011-2015 are listed at the competition website
2010	Cello	Yuki Ito (Japan)	Elizaveta Sushchenko (Russia)	Alexey Zhilin (Russia)	Winners for 2011-2015 are listed at the competition website
2010	Voice	Erwin Belakowitsch (Austria)	Astrid Kessler (Austria)	Martin Hensel (Germany); Veronika Groiss (Belarus)	Winners for 2011-2015 are listed at the competition website
2015	Piano	Maya Ando (Japan)	Uikyung Jung (South Korea)	Katharina Treutler (Germany)	
2015	Chamber music	Project N.&A.: Alisa Kupriyova (piano); Nikita Budnetsky (violin)	Duo Baltinati: Lura Johnson (piano); Ilya Finkelshteyn (cello)	Duo Sonoro: Valeriia Shulga (piano); Andrii Pavlov (violin)	
2015	Violin	Cosima Soulez Lariviere (Netherlands, France)	Matouš Pěruška (Czech Republic)	Daichi Nakamura (Japan)	
2015	Viola	Not awarded	Mingyue Yu (China)	Matthias Schnorbusch (Germany)	
2015	Cello	Christoph Croisé (France, Germany, Switzerland)	Yoosin Park (South Korea)	Kacper Nowak (Poland)	
2016	Chamber music	Duo Yui-Park	Görög Sisters piano duo	Duo Schäffer-Palojtay	
2016	Violin	Paul Kropfitsch (Austria)	Soohyun Park (Austria)	Benjamin Herzl (Austria)	
2016	Viola	Gueli Kim (South Korea)	Tobias Reifland (Germany)	Nikita Gerkusov (Russia)	
2016	Cello	Marcel Johannes Kits (Estonia)	Dóra Kokas (Humgary)	Jérémy Garbarg (France)	
2016	Voice	Daniel Foki (Hungary)	Claire Elizabeth Craig (UK)	Emma Sventelius (Sweden)	
2017	Piano	Adela Liculescu (Romania)	Mayu Kotari (Japan)	Yow-Ting Hsieh (Taiwan)	
2017	Violin	Daichi Nakamura (Japan)	Belle Ting (Canada)	Eunche Kim (South Korea)	
2017	Cello	Ariel Barnes (Canada)	Erica Piccotti (Italy)	Jordan Costard (France)	
2017	Viola	Eunbin Lee (South Korea)	Ziyu Shen (China)	Sào Soulez Larivière (France)	
2017	Voice	Alexander Grassauer (Austria)	Diogo Mendes (Portugal)	Daniel Ochoa (Germany)	
2018	Piano	Mamikon Nakhapetov	Hiroyuki Kawashiri	Maximilian Kromer	
2018	Violin	Eva Zavaro	Maine Nishiyama	Julia Turnovsky	
2018	Cello	Luca Giovannini; Alexey Zhilin		Sul Yoon	
2018	Chamber music	Duo Maestro, Andrey Baranenko, Alexey Zhilin	Arcon Trio, Julius Asal, David Marquard, Janis Marquard	Atalante Quartett, Elisabeth Eber, Thomas Koslowsky, Julia Maria Kürner, Lisa Kürner	
2019	Violin	Simon Wiener	Tikhon Lukyanenko	Hwapyung Yoo	
2019	Chamber music	Trio Legend, Agnieszka Zahaczewska-Książek, Krzysztof Katana und Monika Krasicka	Piano duo Tarvide/ Bumbiss, Roksana Tarvide und Kaspars Bumbišs	Trio Aralia, Théodore Lambert, Ida Derbesse und Magali Mouterde	
2019	Piano	Misako Mihara	Shiho Ojima	Fuko Ishii	
2019	Voice	Fabian Langguth	Aiko Sakurai	Sinhu Kim	
2019	Best voice accompanist	Haruka Izawa			
2020	Violin	Adam Koch Christensen (Denmark)	Chiara Sannicandro (Germany)	Jiaqi Lu (China)	
2020	Viola	Takehiro Konoe (Japan)	Momoko Aritomi (Japan)	Emiko Yuasa (Japan)	
2020	Cello	Ettore Pagano (Italy)	Jaromir Kostka (Germany)	Jeongheon Nam (South Korea)	
2020	Voice	Misaki Morino (Japan)	Sofia Pavone (Germany)	Hongyu Chen (China)	
2020	Best voice accompanist	Yuto Kiguchi (Japan)			
2021	Voice	ex aequo: Yibao Chen (China, piano accompaniment: Mariko Sakonju, Japan) and Ann-Kathrin Niemczyk (Germany)		Corina Koller (Austria, piano accompaniment: Lukas Dorfegger, Austria)	
2021	Viola	Kyungsik Shin (South Korea)	Sarah Strohm (Schwitzerland)	Yunji Jang (South Korea)	
2021	Cello	Jan Sekaci (Romania)	Carlos Vidal Ballester (Spain)	Grace Sohn (Canada)	
2021	Chamber music	Trio Bohémo – Vojtek Jan, Pĕruška Matouš, Vocetková Kristina (all Czech Republic)	Duo Minerva – Obuchi Mayuko, Mitsui Shizuka (both Japan)	Akhtamar Quartet - Alecian Coline, Stasyk Ondine, Pio Jennifer, Simon Cyril (France/Belgium)	
2021	Best voice accompanist	Joseph Alejandro Avile Guerrero (Venezuela)			
2022	-	Competition not held			-
2023	Violin	Jana Jakovljevic	Emrik Revermann	Yue-Xin Pei	
2023	Cello	Yo Kitamura	Arne Zeller	Theresa Laun	
2023	Piano	Uram Kim	Tetiana Donets	Kohei Taruya	
2024	Violin	Stefan Aprodu (Romania)	Ryota Higashi (Japan)	Eduard Steude (Austria)	
2024	Viola	Hiroki Kasai (Japan)	Zeyang Kan (China)	Otoha Tabata (Japan)	
2024	Piano	Timur Mustakimov (USA)	Elia Cecino (Italy)	Hiroshi Katsurahara (Japan)	
2024	Chamber music	Duo Droom-Kunst (Junnosuke Kikuno and Michiko Yoshimura, Japan)	Duo Suono (Sato Hiroki and Eimi Wakui, Japan)	Accio piano trio (Christina Scheicher, Anne Sophie Keckeis, and Clemens Böck, Austria)	
2025	-	Competition not held			-
2026	Art song duos	Korbinian SCHLAG / Milan BEGOVIC	Ferdinand KRUMBÜGEL / Sofi SIMEONIDIS	Caroline GELINAS / Anson NG	

== See also ==
- List of classical music competitions § String instruments
