= Ophélie Gaillard =

French cellist

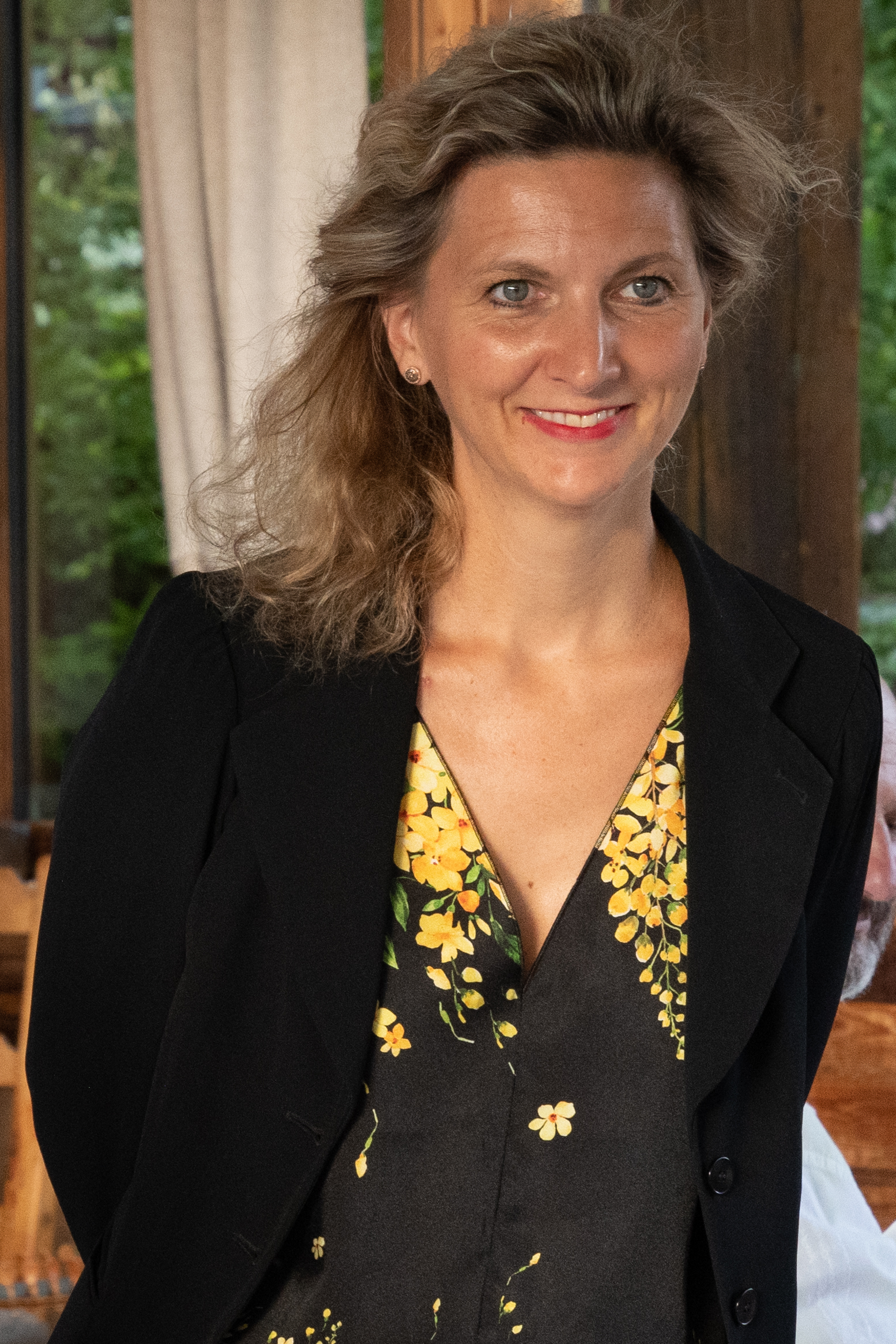
- Born: June 13, 1974 (age 51); Paris, France
- Occupation: Classical cellist

Ophélie Gaillard (born 13 June 1974) is a French cellist.

== Early life ==
Gaillard was born in Paris. While studying at the Conservatoire de Paris, she obtained three first prizes in music: one in chamber music in the class of Maurice Bourgue, one in cello in the class of Philippe Muller, and one in baroque cello in the class of Christophe Coin. A recipient of a Certificate of Aptitude in cello pedagogy and a license in musicology from the Sorbonne, Gaillard has been teaching since 2000.

In 1998, she won third prize in the International Johann Sebastian Bach Competition, and was voted "Revelation: Solo Instrumentalist of the Year" at the Victoires de la musique classique in 2003. She is a recitalist and champion of the solo cello repertoire, from the Bach suites to contemporary music.

== Career ==
Her recordings from the Ambroisie label of the solo Bach cello suites, Britten's cello suites, and his cello sonata with pianist Vanessa Wagner were noticed by music critics internationally.

=== Collaborations ===
Since 2004, she has worked with accordionist Pascal Contet. She also collaborates with dancers, in particular Daniel Larrieu and Sidi Larbi Cherkaoui.

In 2005, Ophélie Gaillard founded Pulcinella, a chamber ensemble dedicated to playing Baroque music on period instruments.

=== Instruments ===
Ophélie Gaillard plays a rare cello made by Francesco Goffriller in 1737. The cello was stolen in a knifepoint robbery in Paris on 15 February 2018. Gaillard appealled for help on Facebook, and the instrument was anonymously returned two days later.
