= Hu Kun =

Chinese violinist and conductor (born 1963)

- 胡坤
- Born: 1963
- Occupations: Violinist; conductor
- Years active: 1970s–present
- Employer: Royal Academy of Music
- Musical career
- Labels: EMI; Nimbus; ASV; China
- Website: www.hukun.net

Hu Kun (Chinese: 胡坤; born 1963) is a Chinese violinist and conductor.

== Biography ==
Hu Kun was born in China just before the Cultural Revolution and started playing violin and piano at age of six with his parents. He moved to Beijing in the 1970s to be the soloist of the China Central Radio Symphony Orchestra, and in 1980, he won fifth prize in the Sibelius International Violin Competition, being the first Chinese citizen to win a prize at a major international violin competition. In 1984, he graduated from the Central Conservatory of Music in Beijing. He has also won prizes in the 1985 Queen Elisabeth Violin Competition, Francescatti Violin Competition, Lipizer Violin Competition, Palm Beach Violin Competition, and Menuhin Violin Competition.

Hu Kun has been a soloist with the Royal Philharmonic Orchestra, Philharmonia Orchestra, Orchestre de Paris, Berlin Radio Symphony Orchestra, MDR Symphony Orchestra, BBC Welsh Symphony Orchestra, BBC Scottish Symphony Orchestra, Halle Orchestra, RTÉ Concert Orchestra, Bavarian Radio Symphony Orchestra, Tonhalle Orchester Zürich, Monte-Carlo Philharmonic Orchestra, Swedish Radio Symphony Orchestra, Iceland Symphony Orchestra, National Orchestra of Belgium and the China National Symphony Orchestra, conducted by such masters as Tadaaki Otaka and Yehudi Menuhin. He has performed in many major concert venues and been broadcast by the BBC, Classic FM, Rundfunk Berlin-Brandenburg, New York Classic FM, and NHK. In 2002 he gave the premiere of Tan Dun’s violin concerto with the Dresden Philharmonic and was featured in a documentary film, produced by Phoenix CNE Europe. Kun has recorded for EMI, Nimbus Records (exclusive), ASV, and China Records.

Kun studied conducting with Colin Davis and started this portion of his career by making a last minute substitution in 1985. He has been invited to conduct the China National Broadcasting Symphony Orchestra, Sichuan Symphony Orchestra, London Schubert Players, Emerald Ensemble Bristol, Xiamen Philharmonic Orchestra. He is also a professor of violin at the Royal Academy of Music in London.
