= Matteo Goffriller =

Venetian luthier (1659 - 1742)

Matteo Goffriller (1659–1742) was a Venetian luthier, particularly noted for the quality of his cellos. He was active between 1685–1735 and was the founder of the "Venetian School" of luthiers, during a time when Venice was one of the most important centers of musical activity in the world.

== Biography ==
Although it is known that Goffriller was born in Brixen, little else is known of him prior to 1685 in Venice. Goffriller arrived in Venice in 1685 to work for luthier Martin Kaiser (Caiser). In 1685 he married Martin Kaiser's daughter Maddalena Maria Kaiser (Caiser), at the Madonna delle Grazie in Venice; they had twelve children (five boys and seven girls) in 26 years. Francesco Goffriller, long thought to be his brother, is now known to have been his son.

He was the founder of the "Venetian School" of luthiers, when Venice was one of the most important centers of musical activity in the world, and is believed to have taught luthiers Domenico Montagnana and Francesco Gobetti in addition to his son Francesco. After arriving in Venice, he is noted for being the city's sole violin and cello maker for some 25 years, between 1685 and 1710.

He died in Venice in 1742.

== Mistaken identities ==
Goffriller's cellos had been erroneously attributed in the past to the Guarneri family, Carlo Bergonzi or even Antonio Stradivari and were virtually unknown until the 1920s, when they began to be discovered. The 1733 Goffriller cello once owned by Pablo Casals was originally attributed to Bergonzi. His earliest authenticated instrument is a viola da gamba dated 1689.

== Goffriller labels ==
The standard label for a Goffriller instrument, whether genuine or forged, uses the Latin inscription Mattheus Goffriller Fece in Venezia Anno [date], identifying maker, city (Venice) and year made; the date is either printed or handwritten. But he actually labeled only a small percentage of the instruments in order to avoid paying Venetian taxes.

Mattheus Goffriller feciebat Venetus, anno 1735

Mattio Gofrilleri in Venetia al' Insigna di Cremona. 1695

Mattio Goffriler Fece in Venezia. Anno 1709

Mattio Goffriller Fece in Venetia. 1721

Matteo Goffriller fecit Venetijis anno 17--

== Legacy ==
Pablo Casals's Goffriller 1733 cello was his main concert instrument for most of his professional life. He acquired it in 1913 and played it until his death in 1973. Since 2000, winners of the International Pablo Casals Cello Competition in Kronberg, Germany may use it for two years. Terence Weil played another Goffriller which had been used by Casals before the one he played between 1913 and 1973.

Other notable musicians who have used Goffriller instruments include:

- Anner Bylsma
- Gautier Capucon
- Amit Peled
- Zuill Bailey
- Colin Carr
- Charles Castleman
- Marc Coppey
- Christoph Croisé
- Aaron Boyd
- Robert deMaine
- Andres Diaz
- Jules Eskin (Principal Cellist of BSO 1964-2016)
- Emanuel Feuermann
- László Fenyö
- Raya Garbousova
- Alban Gerhardt
- Natalia Gutman
- Sol Gabetta
- Matt Haimovitz
- Milt Hinton
- Sheku Kanneh-Mason
- Édouard Lalo
- Trey Lee
- Matthew Lipman
- Wilhelm Melcher
- Jonathan Miller (cellist)
- Daniel Mueller-Schott
- Lorne Munroe
- Susie Napper
- Arkady Orlovsky
- Johann Sebastian Paetsch
- Nicolo Paganini
- Ettore Pagano
- Leslie Parnas
- Carlo Alfredo Piatti
- Jacqueline du Pré
- Jennifer Pike
- Leonard Rose
- Albert Sammons
- Mischa Schneider
- Joseph Schuster
- Harvey Shapiro
- George Sopkin
- Janos Starker
- Paul Watkins
- Peter Wiley

== Goffriller instruments ==
=== Violins ===
Sobriquet	Year	Provenance	Notes
Goffriller violin	1695		currently played by Andrej Power
Sammons	1696	Kenneth Sillito	currently played by Beth Hafter
Goffriller violin	1700	ex-Stopak	currently played by Aaron Boyd
Goffriller violin	1700		played by Alexander Yudkovsky since 2008
Goffriller violin	ca. 1700	Stradivari Society	played by Michala Høj
ex-Sivori; ex-Lalo	1700		
Goffriller violin	1700		played on by Jorja Fleezanis
Goffriller violin	1700		played on by Fanny Clamagirand
Goffriller violin	1702		played by Jaakko Kuusis
Goffriller violin	1708		played by Jennifer Pike
Goffriller violin	ca. 1720	Alan Parmenter	purchased in 2008 by an anonymous benefactor
Goffriller violin	1720	played- by Yuri Torchinsky	
Goffriller violin	1722		stolen from violinist Charmian Gadd in 1999, subsequently recovered
Goffriller Violin	1723		played by Amanda Favier since 1996
Goffriller Violin	1730	the Counts of Colloredo Castle, Friuli	

=== Violas ===
Sobriquet	Year	Provenance	Notes
Goffriller viola	1727	ex-Walter Trampler	measures 41 cm; currently played by Richard O'Neill
Goffriller viola	1700	Rachel Barton Pine Foundation instrument loan	currently played by Emad Zolfaghari

=== Cellos ===
Sobriquet	Year	Provenance	Notes
Goffriller cello	1689	Mischa Maisky	currently played by Sevak Avanesyan
Goffriller cello	1690	previously Sabatier, Axelrod, The New Jersey Symphony Orchestra	labeled: Nicolas Amatus, previously played by Maria Kliegel
Goffriller cello	ca. 1700	Antonio Meneses	
Goffriller cello	1693	ex-Leonard Rose; ex-Alfredo Piatti	on loan to Leonard Elschenbroich
Goffriller cello	1693	labeled "Carlo Bergonzi"	currently played by Bruno Philippe
Goffriller cello	1693	Previously owned and played by Mischa Schneider of the Budapest String Quartet	features a carved Rosette on the top, under the fingerboard; currently played by Zuill Bailey
Goffriller cello	1695	played by Anner Bylsma	
Count Marcello	1697	Nicholas Anderson; Count Girolamo Marcello; Aldo Pais of Venice; Irving Klein	
Rosette	1698	Leslie Parnas	features a carved rosette decoration
Goffriller cello	1698	played by Andres Diaz	
Goffriller cello	1698		exhibited at the Landesmuseum Joanneum, Graz, Austria
D'Archambeau	ca. 1700	Iwan D'Archambeau	played by Jonathan Miller of the Gramercy Trio, Boston Artists Ensemble, and formerly Boston Symphony Orchestra
Goffriller cello	1700	Ex-Amadeus Quartet	played by Christian-Pierre La Marca
Goffriller cello	1701		played by Gautier Capuçon
Garbousova	1703	Karl Fruh; Raya Garbousova (1930–1951)	
Comte de Gabriac	1703		currently played by Trey Lee
The Star	1705	Janos Starker (1965)	
ex-Warburg	1706		played by François Kieffer (Modigliani Quartet)
Goffriller cello	1707	Previously Hershel Gorodetzky (now Gordon), The Philadelphia Orchestra & Stringart Quartet.	played by Eric Kim
Goffriller cello	1708	Istituto della Pietà, Venice	
Goffriller cello	1710		played by Matt Haimovitz
Goffriller cello	1710		played by Anthony Ross, principal cello, Minnesota Orchestra
Goffriller cello	1710		played by Richard Hirschl, cellist, Chicago Symphony Orchestra
Goffriller cello	1710		played by Xavier Phillips, French cellist
Goffriller cello	1710		played by Alban Gerhardt, German cellist
Goffriller cello	1711		played by Marc Coppey
Goffriller cello	1712		Played by Christoph Croisé
Goffriller cello	1715	Samsung Foundation of Culture	played by Sara Sant'Ambrogio
Goffriller cello	1715	Stradivari Society	
Goffriller cello	1717		Played by Marie Hallynck
Goffriller cello	1720	Emanuel Feuermann	played by Joseph Schuster
Goffriller cello	1720		played by Bruno Delepelaire
Goffriller cello	1720	"ex-Lederlin"	currently played by David Delacroix
Goffriller cello	1722	Yo-Yo Ma	played by Valentin Erben
Gofriller cello	1723	ex-Piatti	played by Arkady Orlovsky principal cello, Indianapolis Symphony Orchestra
Goffriller cello	1722		played by Pierre Fournier
ex-Cossmann	1726		played by Carl Fuchs, Jenska Slebos; once thought to be a Bergonzi.
Saphir; ex-Harvey Shapiro	1727		currently played by Daniel Müller-Schott
Goffriller cello	1728	Samuel Mayes	currently played by Timothy Eddy
Goffriller cello	1730-1735	“Maddalena”	currently owned and played by Robert deMaine
Gorrfiller cello	1730	Johannes Goritzki	currently played by Johannes Goritzki
Guffy	1730	Johann Sebastian Paetsch	played by Gunther Paetsch (1970–1985)
ex-Pablo Casals	1733		Currently played by Amit Peled; played by Matt Haimovitz; played by Anne Gastinel; played by Claudio Bohorquez.
Goffriller cello	1734	Nippon Violin	currently played by Yuki Ito
Goffriller cello	1735	Hermann Busch	currently played by Matthias Naegele

=== Double basses ===
Sobriquet	Year	Provenance	Notes
Benedetto Marcello	1712		exhibited in at the Venice Conservatory

== Bibliography ==
- Violin and Lute makers of Venice 1640 -176 by Stefano Pio, Ed. Venice research, Venezia 2004 www.veniceresearch.com
- Journal of The Violin Society of America, VSA papers Vol. XXI, No. 1 “The Life and Work of Matteo Goffriller of Venice 1659–1742” by Stefano Pio.
