= Emmanuel Siffert =

Swiss conductor

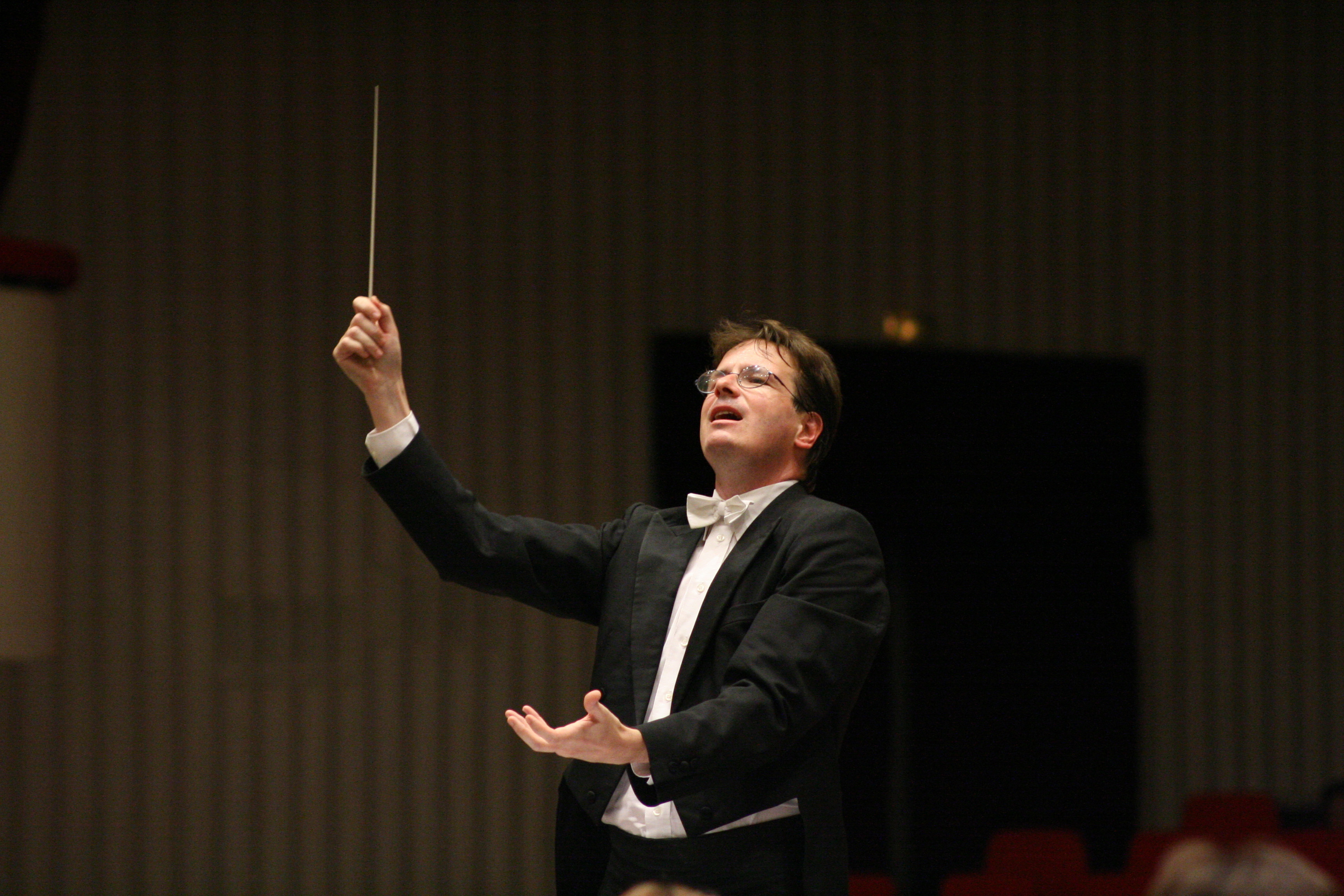
- Born: November 1, 1967 (age 58); Fribourg, Switzerland
- Occupation: conductor
- Website: www.emmanuelsiffert.com

Emmanuel Siffert (born 1967 in Fribourg, Switzerland) is a Swiss conductor.

== Career ==
Siffert first studied the violin in Switzerland and in Salzburg with Sandor Végh. He studied conducting in Switzerland, Finland, and in Milan with Carlo Maria Giulini, and twice won the "best conductor" award at the Schweizer Tonkünstlerverein. He has made several recordings with various chamber orchestras, as well with the National Symphony Orchestra of South Africa. He has been the assistant of Rafael Frühbeck de Burgos at the Teatro Lirico di Cagliari. He frequently conducts the Swiss Chamber Orchestra. He works as a guest conductor in Europe, the United States, and South America, including the Wiener Mozart Orchester and the San Juan Symphony Orchestra. Emmanuel Siffert is now chief conductor at the European Chamber Opera in London (La Traviata, Tosca, Carmen, etc.) Recent engagements include, among others, concerts with the Royal Philharmonic Orchestra and the Orchestra della Svizzera Italiana.
