= Sichuan Symphony Orchestra =

Symphony orchestra in Chengdu, China

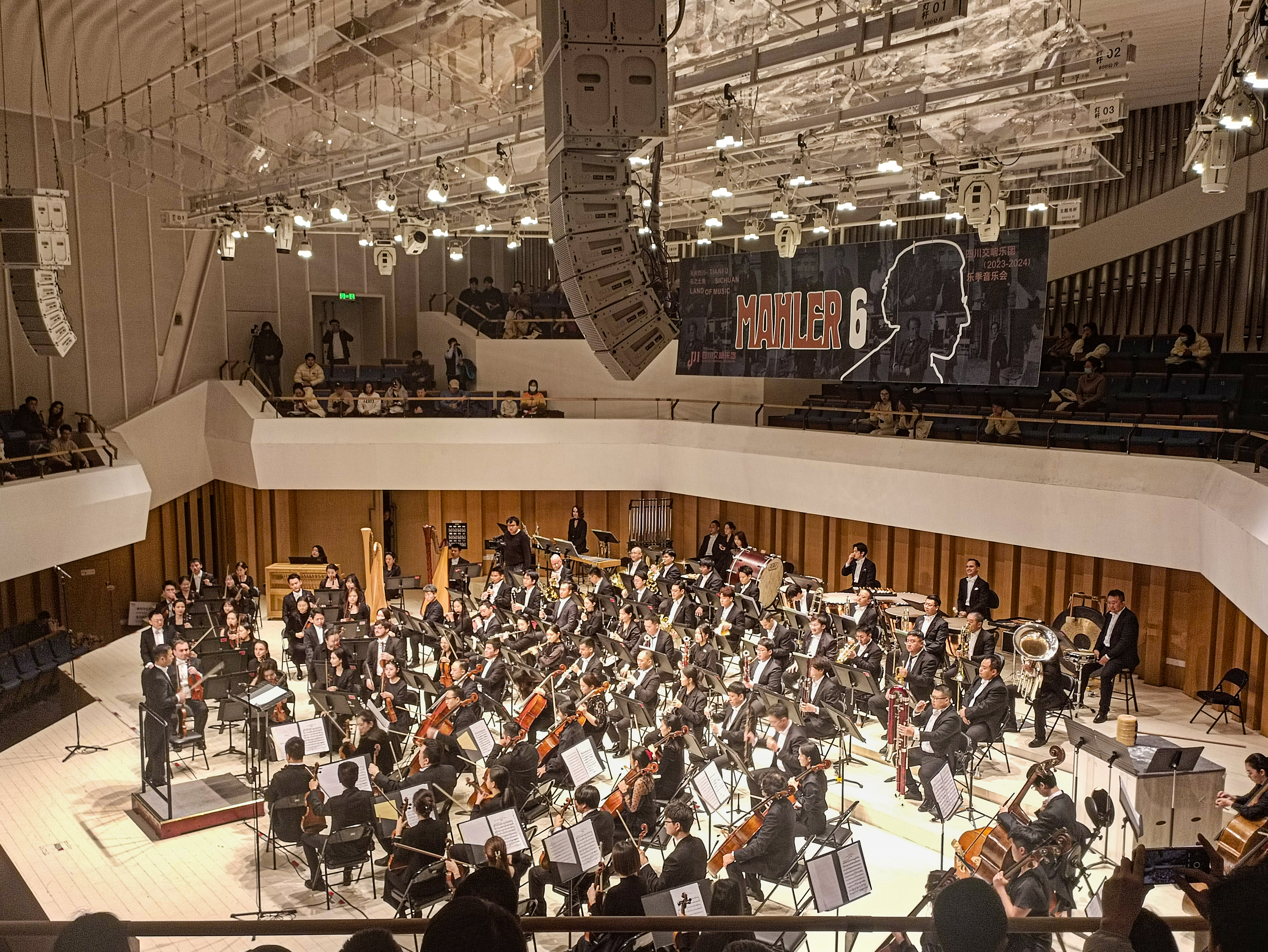
Darrell Ang conducting Sichuan Symphony Orchestra, December 2023

The Sichuan Symphony Orchestra (Chinese: 四川交响乐团; pinyin: Sìchuān Jiāoxiǎng Yuètuán; abbreviated SSO) is a Chinese symphony orchestra based in Chengdu, Sichuan. It was established as an independent professional orchestra in 2002 and is a provincial professional orchestra of Sichuan. The orchestra includes a full symphony orchestra, the Chinese instrumental ensemble Beauty and Melody (Chinese: 天姿国乐), and a professional choir.

Since its establishment, the orchestra has presented symphonic concerts, themed programmes and educational activities in Chengdu and elsewhere in China. Its repertoire includes standard Western symphonic works, Chinese orchestral and vocal works, contemporary music, film music and large-scale choral-orchestral projects.

== History ==
The Sichuan Symphony Orchestra was established in 2002 and subsequently developed into an independent professional orchestral institution in Sichuan. The orchestra became one of the principal professional symphonic ensembles in western China, supported by the Sichuan provincial authorities and based in Chengdu.

Tang Qingshi (Chinese: 唐青石) served as executive director and principal conductor in the orchestra's earlier period. The Singaporean conductor Darrell Ang was appointed artistic director and chief conductor in December 2016. Under Ang's leadership, the orchestra developed regular music-season programming and placed emphasis on both Western symphonic repertoire and contemporary Chinese music.

In 2021 the orchestra announced its fifth symphonic season, Tianfu Sichuan, Land of Music, with 26 concert programmes planned from September 2021 to July 2022. The season included collaborations with conductors, composers and soloists from China and abroad, and presented works ranging from classical symphonic repertoire to contemporary Chinese compositions.

In May 2024, the orchestra gave the first concert in the Sichuan Symphony Hall at the Sichuan Provincial Culture and Art Centre. The programme included the violin concerto The Butterfly Lovers and Carl Orff's Carmina Burana, with violinist Lü Siqing, conductor Ham Shin-Ik, the Sichuan Symphony Orchestra Chorus, the Lanzhou Concert Hall Chorus, the "We Are Together" children's charity choir, soprano Zhang Jingdan, baritone Li Geng and countertenor Xiao Ma.

By 2026, Ni Fan (Chinese: 范妮) was listed by the orchestra as artistic director and principal conductor.

== Artistic directors and conductors ==
The orchestra's earlier leadership included Tang Qingshi, who served as executive director and principal conductor. Darrell Ang became artistic director and chief conductor in December 2016. Ang is a Singaporean conductor who won the Grand Prize, Audience Prize and Orchestra Prize at the 50th Besançon International Conducting Competition, and has conducted orchestras including the London Philharmonic Orchestra, NHK Symphony Orchestra and St Petersburg Philharmonic Orchestra.

Ni Fan later became artistic director and principal conductor. Her work has included collaborations with orchestras in China and abroad, and she has also been active as professor at the China Conservatory of Music and permanent conductor of the China Youth Philharmonic Orchestra.

== Concert activity and repertoire ==
The orchestra's concert activity includes symphonic season concerts, chamber music events, public-interest performances and programmes involving Chinese and Western repertoire. Its programming has included works by Ludwig van Beethoven, Pyotr Ilyich Tchaikovsky, Gustav Mahler, Sergei Rachmaninoff, Béla Bartók, Sergei Prokofiev, Carl Orff, Manuel de Falla and Ottorino Respighi, as well as Chinese works and commissioned or thematic projects.

The orchestra has also presented contemporary and Chinese-themed projects. In 2021 it took part in the large-scale symphonic work Lighthouse (Chinese: 灯塔), commissioned jointly by several Chinese orchestras, including the Sichuan Symphony Orchestra, Shenzhen Symphony Orchestra, Tianjin Symphony Orchestra, Qingdao Symphony Orchestra, Harbin Symphony Orchestra and Wuhan Philharmonic Orchestra.

== Collaborations ==
The Sichuan Symphony Orchestra has collaborated with Chinese and international conductors, singers, instrumentalists and composers. Early publicised collaborations included Hu Kun, Plácido Domingo, Song Zuying and Argentine soprano Virginia Tola. Later seasons and special projects have included collaborations with Zhao Jiping, Tan Dun, Zhang Guoyong, Tan Lihua, Josep Vicent, Li Biao, Timur Martinov, Chen Xi, Wan Jieni, Xie Ming, Wen Ziyang, Zhang Meigui, Kuang Junhong, Zeng Yun and Liu Hang. The orchestra has also performed with Lang Lang in the 2023 CCTV Mid-Autumn Festival Gala, in a performance conducted by Xu Zhijun. Other documented collaborations include Alexandra Dariescu, pianist Anna Tsybuleva,José María Moreno Valiente, Nayden Todorov, Lü Siqing, Ham Shin-Ik, Zhang Jingdan, Li Geng and Xiao Ma.
