= Dina Parakhina =

Russian pianist and teacher

Dina Parakhina is a Russian pianist and teacher.

== Biography ==
Born in Russia, Dina Parakhina studied at the Moscow Central School of Music with Tamara Bobovich and later at the Moscow Tchaikovsky Conservatory with Yevgeny Malinin. (She graduated at the top of the class, among the class were Mikhail Pletnev and Natalia Trull). Following her graduation, she became Professor of Piano at the Central Music School-Moscow Conservatoire, and was the chair of the department for fifteen years.

Since moving to the United Kingdom and the appointment of BBC pianist in the early 1990s, Dina Parakhina has always combined teaching with an active performing career and has appeared frequently as a recitalist and soloist with major Russian and British orchestras at prestigious venues across the world, including the Bolshoi National Theatre Orchestra, the BBC Philharmonic Orchestra in the Royal Albert Hall at the BBC Proms, the London Symphony Orchestra at the Barbican Centre, and extensive recital tours in France, Spain, Germany, Belgium, Italy, Ireland, Singapore, China and Thailand. As a chamber musician, she has collaborated with Yuri Torchinsky, Lyobov Kazarnovskaya, Gegem Grogoriam, Nikita Storojev and Valentin Feigin, with whom, she gave a German radio premiere of the Rubinstein Cello Sonata at the 125th Moscow Tchaikovsky Conservatory Festival in Germany.

Parakhina is currently a Professor of Piano at the Royal College of Music in London, Royal Northern College of Music as well as the Chetham's School of Music in Manchester.

== Discography ==
Parakhina's commercial recordings have received critical attention, including the Mendelssohn's Double Concerto with the BBC Philharmonic, Beethoven's Piano Concerto No. 4 and Rachmaninoff's Piano Concerto No. 3 with the Russian Bolshoi Theatre National Orchestra as well as Prokofiev's Piano Concerto No. 2. She has also made a number of live broadcasts on the BBC radio 3.

=== Selected solo recordings ===
- Beethoven - Piano Sonata No. 28, op. 101/ Diabelli Variation op. 120
- Bach/Liszt - Fantasy and Fugue in G minor BWV 542
- Brahms - Handel Variations op. 24
- Scriabin - Sonata No. 3 in F sharp minor, op. 23
- Prokofiev - Sonata No. 7 in B flat, op. 87
- Rachmaninoff - Piano Sonata No. 2 in B flat minor, op. 36 (Original Version)/ Corelli Variations op. 42/ Melodie in E major, op. 3 no. 3
- Medtner - Piano Sonata, Op.25 no.1/ Piano Sonata, Op.25 no.2/ 6 Fairy Tales, op.51
