= Francesco Goffriller =

Francesco Goffriller (also Francesco Gofriller) (1692–1750) is considered one of the master Italian violin, viola and cello makers of the Venetian school. He was thought to have been active between 1709 and 1739. Although long thought to be the brother of the Venetian luthier Matteo Goffriller, he is now known to have been his son. He worked as a luthier in Venice from approximately 1709 until 1714 when he moved to Udine. Notable musicians who used Francesco Goffriller cellos including Jacqueline du Pré, Pablo Casals and Daniel Müller-Schott.

== Goffriller Instruments ==
=== Cellos ===
Francesco Goffriller built many cellos in his lifetime. These are several known to still exist.

Model	Year	Owner	Notes
Francesco Goffriller cello	1737	CIC (French Bank)	now played by Ophélie Gaillard (or Amir Eldan)
Francesco Goffriller cello	1735		now played by Kenneth Kuo (or Amir Eldan)
