= Andrei Baranov =

Russian footballer

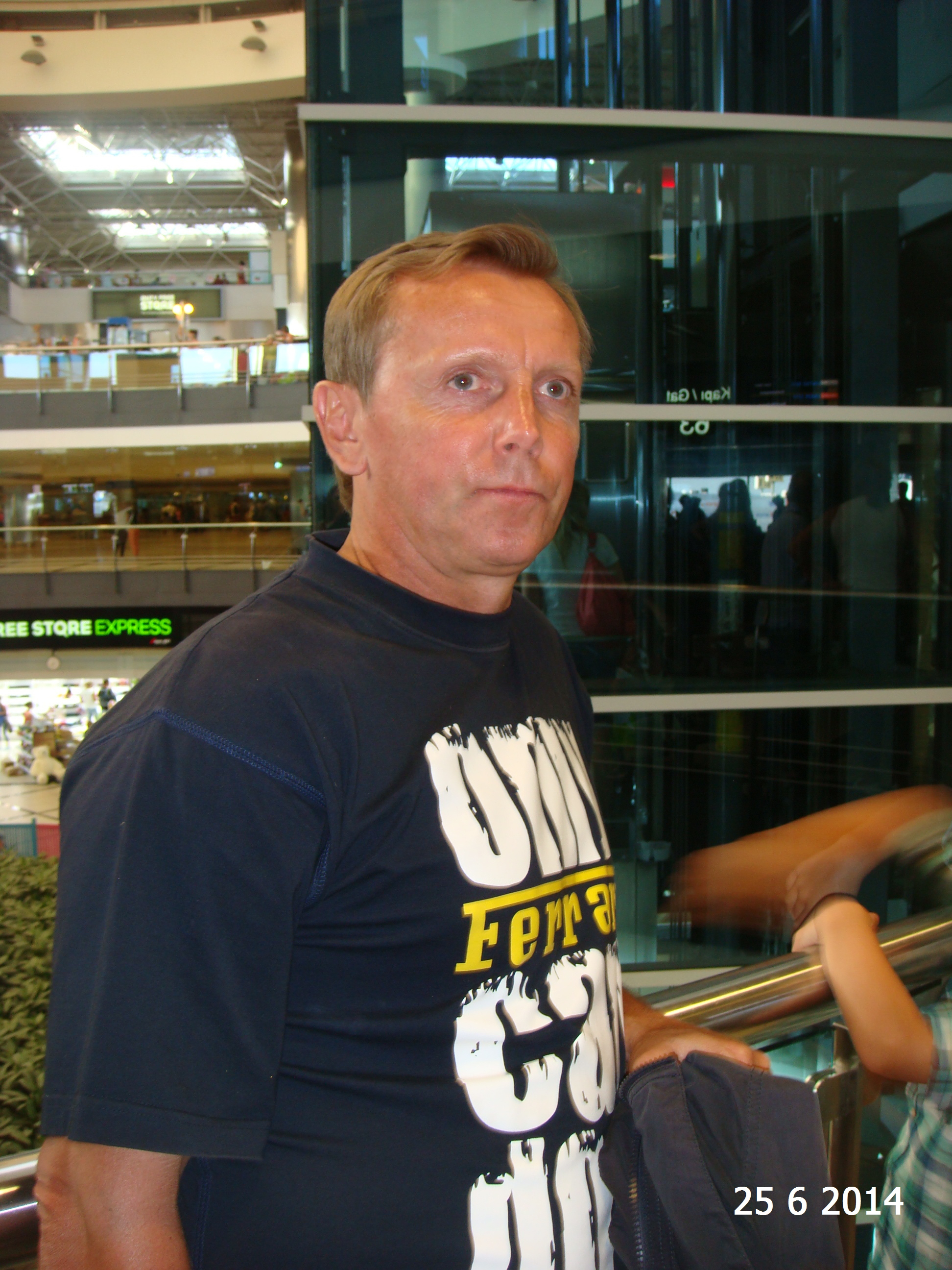

Personal information
- Full name: Andrei Gennadyevich Baranov
- Date of birth: 19 February 1962 (age 64)
- Height: 1.80 m (5 ft 11 in)
- Position: Defender

Youth career
- SK MELZ Moscow
- PFC CSKA Moscow

Senior career*
Years	Team	Apps	(Gls)
1979–1983	PFC CSKA Moscow	5	(0)
1983–1985	FC Metallurg Magnitogorsk	51	(1)
1986–1989	FC Volga Kalinin	96	(2)
1990–1992	FC Rubin Kazan	91	(10)
1993	FC Luch Vladivostok	29	(0)
1994–1995	Sur SC		
1995–1997	FC Irtysh Omsk	34	(1)
- * Club domestic league appearances and goals

Andrei Gennadyevich Baranov (Russian: Андрей Геннадьевич Баранов; born 19 February 1962) is a former Russian football player.
