= Avri Levitan =

Israeli violist (born 1973)

Avri Levitan עברי לביטן
- Born: 1973 (age 51–52); Tel Aviv, Israel
- Genres: Classical
- Occupation: Musician
- Instrument: Viola
- Website: avrilevitan.com

Avri Levitan (Hebrew: עברי לביטן; born 1973) is an Israeli violist based in Berlin. He conceived the nonprofit Musethica with Carmen Marcuello in 2009 and launched it in 2012 in Zaragoza, Spain. Levitan has received nominations at the BBC Music Magazine Awards in 2009 and the Royal Philharmonic Society Music Awards in 2012.

== Early life and education ==
Levitan was born in 1973 in Tel Aviv, Israel, and is of Polish descent. His parents introduced him to classical music, and he began taking viola lessons at the age of five. As a youth, he found practicing the viola to be challenging, as he preferred football. He told China Daily, "But when I stopped playing music, after one or two days, I realized that I cannot live without music." In an interview published by the America-Israel Cultural Foundation, Levitan states that he was inspired, while growing up in Israel, by artists such as Leonard Bernstein, Pnina Salzman, and also Haim Taub, with whom he studied.

Levitan studied at the Rubin Tel Aviv Academy before going on to receive a masters degree from the Conservatoire National Supérieur de Paris. Pinchas Zukerman, Michael Tree, and Ivry Gitlis were his advisers while he was a student. In 1994, he performed at Schleswig-Holstein Musik Festival in his first performance with the Israeli Symphony Orchestra.

== Career ==
In 2001, Levitan performed on the viola at the Women's League Hall with Yonatan Zak, who performed on the piano. The Jerusalem Post reviewer Ury Eppstein wrote, "Levitan, young and obviously talented, displayed pure intonation and a warm singing tone, more than one commonly hears from this often pale-sounding instrument. His rendition of Schubert's 'Arpeggione Sonata' was animated and flowing, sensitive to many of the work's subtleties, indicating a remarkable degree of musicality."

His 2009 album was a BBC Music Magazine Awards nominee, and he also received a 2012 Royal Philharmonic Society Music Awards nomination. Levitan toured with the Nordic Symphony Orchestra under the direction of Anu Tali, performing Max Bruch's Kol Nidrei at the Vienna Konzerthaus Großer Saal.

In 2009, Levitan conceived of Musethica with Carmen Marcuello and launched it in 2012 in Zaragoza, Spain. Musethica merges the words "music" and "aesthetics". According to The Jerusalem Post, "The central tenet of the project is to create a model for gifted music students to perform on a regular basis for different audiences, principally for people who do not typically attend traditional concert halls." Musethica is now also active in Berlin, Germany.

=== Documentary ===
The documentary film k.364, by Douglas Gordon, tells Levitan's story and that of fellow Israeli musician Roi Shiloah. k.364 was also produced as a video installation with multiple screens.

== Personal life ==
Levitan is Jewish. He is married to the Swedish violinist Maria Winiarski, and they have three children.
