= Suyeon Kang =

South Korean and Australian violinist

- 강수연
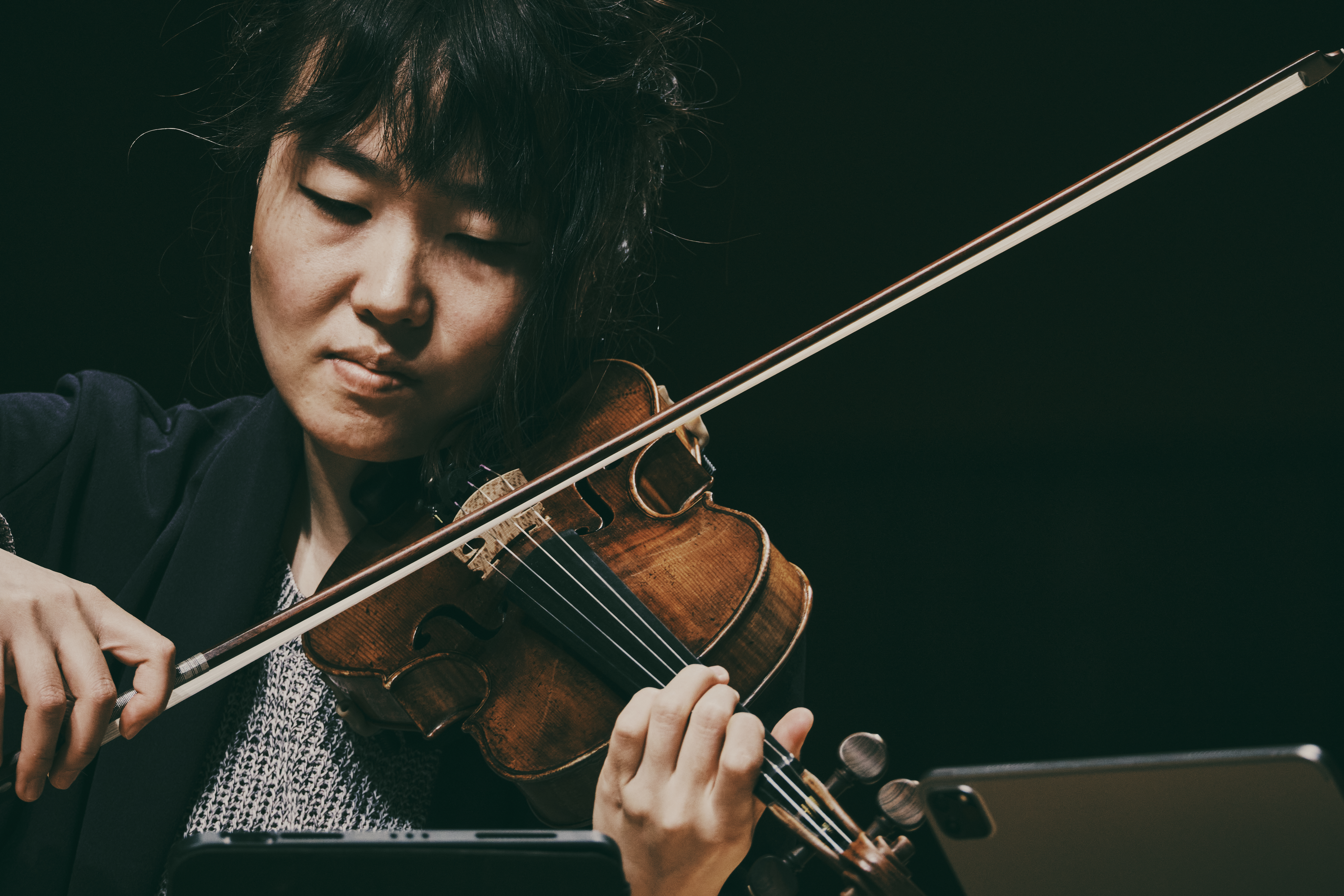
- Born: June 23, 1989 (age 37); South Korea
- Citizenship: Australian
- Occupations: Violinist and academic teacher
- Organization(s): Folkwang University of the Arts ; Hochschule für Musik Hanns Eisler

Suyeon Kang (Korean: 강수연; born June 23, 1989) is a South Korean and Australian violinist and academic teacher. She has been based in Germany since 2007.

== Activity ==
Kang is a founding member of the string trio Trio Boccherini, and in 2023 became the newest and youngest member of one of the world's leading string quartets, the Belcea Quartet.

She previously served as concertmaster of the Kammerakademie Potsdam (2019–2025) and was a long-standing member of the Camerata Bern (2017–2024), frequently serving as its leader.

Since 2025 she is on the International Artistic Committee of Musethica.

== Teaching ==
As of 2026, Kang serves as Professor of Chamber Music at the Folkwang University of the Arts in Essen, maintaining a violin class at the Hochschule für Musik Hanns Eisler in Berlin.

She was previously a long-term (2015–2021) teaching assistant of Antje Weithaas.

== Awards ==
Kang has won several international awards: Michael Hill International Violin Competition (becoming the first Australian to receive top honors in the history of the contest), Yehudi Menuhin International Violin Competition, Buenos Aires, and Bayreuth. Prior to her relocation to Europe she was named the grand prize winner of the Australian Young Performer of the Year at the age of 16.

She is also a special prize winner at the International Violin Competition of Indianapolis and the Leopold Mozart Competition in Augsburg.

== Background & Education ==
Kang was born in 1989 in Seoul to South Korean parents. The family relocated to Canada and then to Australia, where Kang received her first violin lessons with Josette Esquedin Morgan at the age of 6, later continuing with the late Alice Waten and Goetz Richter.

In 2004 at the age of 14, she attended the Australian National Academy of Music. Between the ages of 14 and 16, she was awarded several Australian instrumental accolades, including the John Curro National Youth Concerto Competition, 2MBS Fine Music Sydney Young Performer's Awards, the Dorcas McClean Travelling Scholarship and the ABC Young Performers Awards.

In 2007 Kang moved to Germany, obtaining her diploma under the tutelage of Daniel Gaede at the Hochschule für Musik Nürnberg. She completed her postgraduate studies in Berlin at the Hochschule für Musik Hanns Eisler Berlin (Masters and Konzertexamen) under Antje Weithaas, also serving as her long-term teaching assistant.

Her chamber music teachers were the late Hatto Beyerle (Alban Berg Quartett) and Rainer Schmidt (violinist) of the Hagen Quartet.

== Recordings ==
Kang has recorded extensively in a solo capacity, as a chamber musician, and as a director of chamber orchestras.

-Bloch Violin pieces / Bartok Violin Sonata n.1 (Atoll, 2018)

-Bach: Koriolov, Vinnitskaya, Georgieva/Kammerakademie Potsdam (Alpha, 2019)

-Beethoven Complete String Trios op. 9/ op.3, op.8 (Genuin, 2019/2021)

-Hungarian String Trios (BIS, 2024)

-Mélodies Infines (Naxos, 2024)

-Belcea Quartet: Debussy & Syzmanowski (Alpha, 2025)

-Belcea Quartet/Quatuor Ébène: Mendelssohn & Enescu (Warner & Erato, 2025)

-Conversations à Trois, Franco-Belgian String Trios (BIS, 2026)

-Ning Feng/Kammerdamie Potsdam/Suyeon Kang - Complete Mozart Concertos volume 1 (Channel Classics, 2026)
