= Nikki Chooi =

Canadian violinist (born 1989)

- Born: January 31, 1989 (age 37); Victoria, British Columbia, Canada
- Genre: Classical
- Instrument: Violin
- Labels: Atoll; Naxos
- Website: nikkichooi.com

Nikki Chooi (born January 31, 1989) is a Chinese-Canadian-American classical violinist. Chooi is currently concertmaster of the Buffalo Philharmonic Orchestra and Santa Fe Opera Orchestra. He is a prize winner of the Queen Elisabeth Music Competition and Tchaikovsky International Violin Competition and first-prize winner of the 2013 Michael Hill International Violin Competition, Montreal Symphony Manulife Competition, and Klein International Strings Competition.

== Life and career ==
Chooi was born in Victoria, British Columbia, Canada, to parents of Chinese descent. He began the violin at the age of four in the Suzuki method at the Victoria Conservatory of Music and at age nine, he became a protege of Canadian violinist Sydney Humphreys.

In 2000, Chooi made his orchestral debut with the Victoria Symphony Orchestra and was subsequently invited to perform at the 2001 Victoria Symphony "Splash" held at the Victoria Inner Harbour for an audience of over 50,000 people. That same year, aged twelve, he performed Haydn's Violin Concerto in C Major with the Sinfonia Toronto Orchestra at the Glenn Gould Studio, which was recorded and broadcast nationally by CBC Radio.

In 2003, he began studies with Bill van der Sloot at the Mount Royal Conservatory in Calgary, Canada. His summer studies included attending the Morningside Music Bridge and the Young Artist Programme at the National Arts Centre. While he was still in high school, Chooi won First Prize at the 2004 Canadian National Music Festival, and a few months later he won the 2004 Montreal Standard Life Competition where he debuted with the Montreal Symphony Orchestra under the baton of Jacque Lacombe. In 2007, he was the awarded a "Special Prize" at the International Tchaikovsky Competition held in Moscow, Russia.

Chooi attended the Curtis Institute of Music and the Juilliard School. His mentors have included Ida Kavafian, Joseph Silverstein, and Donald Weilerstein. He has also worked closely with Pamela Frank, Shmuel Ashkenasi, Peter Wiley, and Pinchas Zukerman.

Over the years, Chooi has performed with orchestras in Canada and internationally such as the St Petersburg State Symphony, Malaysian Philharmonic Orchestra, National Arts Centre Orchestra, Calgary Philharmonic, Auckland Philharmonia, Montreal Symphony Orchestra, Orchestre Royal de Chambre de Wallonie, and the National Orchestra of Belgium. As a recitalist, he has performed at the Vancouver Recital Series, Musica Viva Australia, Carnegie's Weill Recital Hall, Astral Artist Concert Series in Philadelphia, and the Harris Theatre of Chicago. He has performed chamber music at the Ravinia Festival, Chamber Music Northwest, the Dresden Music Festival, the Moritzburg Festival in Germany, the Marlboro Music Festival, and he has toured with Musicians from Marlboro.

Chooi performs regularly with his violinist brother, Timothy Chooi. Together, they have performed with the Edmonton Symphony, Newfoundland Symphony, Malaysian Philharmonic and in recital at the Orford Centre for the Arts, Ottawa Chamber Music Festival, and the Mooredale Series in Toronto.

During the 2015–2016 season, Chooi was a member of the ensemble Time for Three, which performed with the Hong Kong Philharmonic and in locations including Barbados, Grand Teton, and La Jolla SummerFest.

As of 2024, Chooi is concertmaster of the Buffalo Philharmonic Orchestra under music director JoAnn Falletta. He has performed as a guest concertmaster with the Boston Symphony Orchestra, Pittsburgh Symphony Orchestra, Milwaukee Symphony Orchestra, Houston Symphony, Sydney Symphony Orchestra, and Macao Orchestra.

Chooi has recorded for Naxos, Beau Fleuve, Atoll, and Decca labels. He performs on a 1713 Stradivarius provided by Canimex, Inc., a 1749 G. B. Guadagnini on extended loan through the Stradivari Society of Chicago, and a 2016 Joseph Curtin. Chooi endorses Thomastik-Infeld strings.

== Awards ==
Chooi has received prestigious awards over the years.

- 2004 First Prize Winner of the Canadian National Music Festival, Charlottetown, Canada
- 2004 First Prize Winner of the Canadian Music Competition, Toronto, Canada
- 2004 First Prize Winner of the Montreal Standard Life Competition, Montreal, Canada
- 2007 Special Prize at the 2007 International Tchaikovsky Competition
- 2008 Recipient of the Sylva Gelber Foundation Award
- 2009 Recipient of the Canada Council for the Arts Music Instrument Bank Competition, Toronto, Canada
- 2009 First Prize Klein Competition, San Francisco, United States
- 2012 Laureate of the 2012 Queen Elisabeth Competition, Brussels, Belgium
- 2013 First Prize at the Michael Hill International Violin Competition

== Discography ==
- 2026: Double: Nikki & Timothy Chooi (Orchid)
- 2025: A Hero's Life: Strauss Ein Heldenleben & Ranjabaran Violin Concerto (Beau Fleuve)
- 2024: Lukas Foss 3 American Pieces (Naxos)
- 2021: Vivaldi Four Seasons (Beau Fleuve)
- 2021: Violin Repertoire Levels 4-8 (Royal Conservatory of Music)
- 2020: Schmitt Legende, Op. 66 for Violin and Orchestra (Naxos)
- 2014: Debut recording of works by Gershwin, Prokofiev, and Ravel (Atoll Label)

== See also ==
- Timothy Chooi
- List of Stradivarius instruments
