= Rocco Filippini =

Swiss musician (1943–2021)

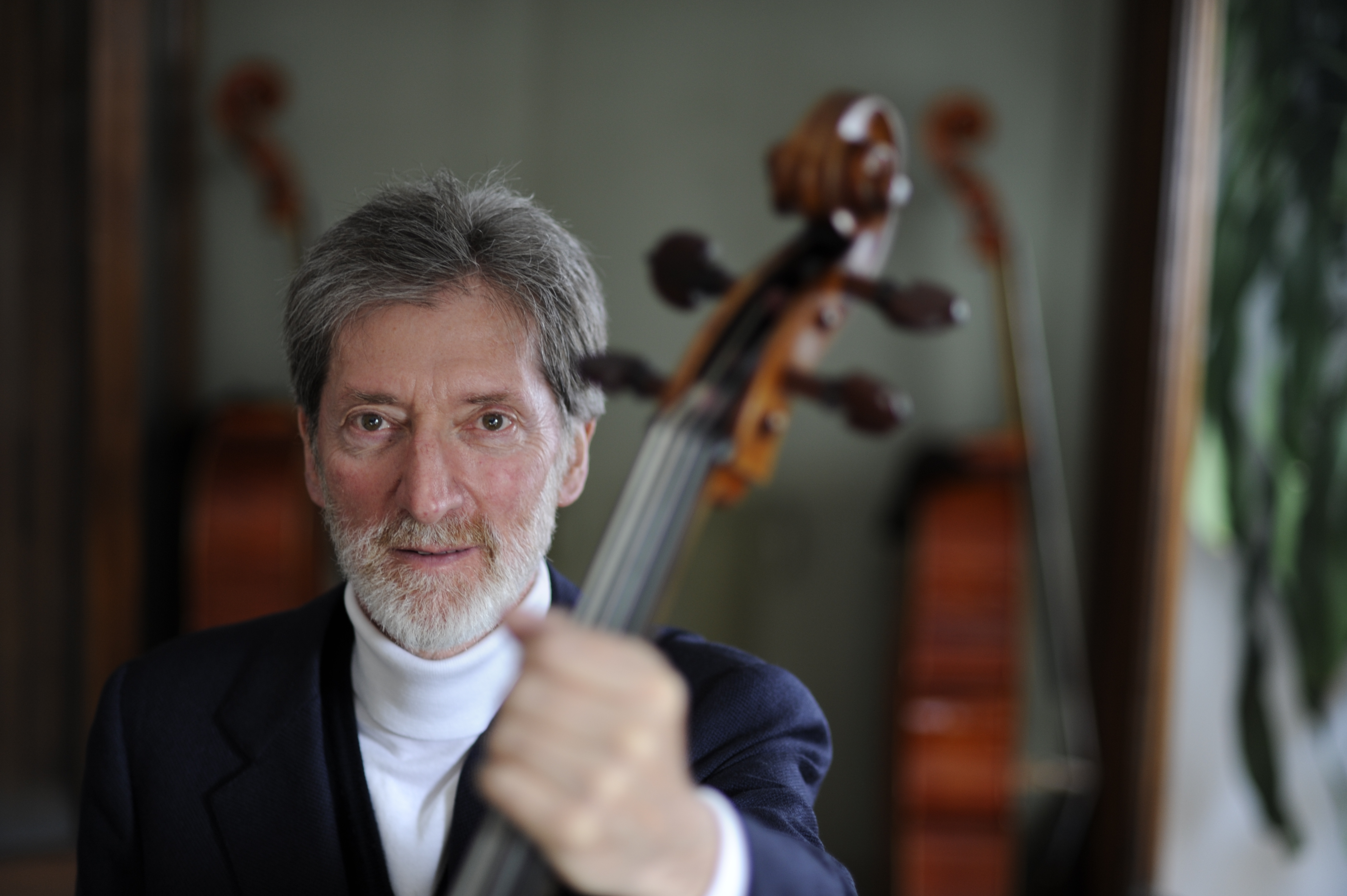
- Rocco Filippini (2009)

Background information
- Born: 7 September 1943; Switzerland
- Died: 13 April 2021 (aged 77) Switzerland
- Genres: classical
- Instrument: cello

Rocco Filippini (7 September 1943 – 13 April 2021) was a Swiss classical cellist.

== Biography and musical career ==
The son of Felice Filippini, a painter, writer and broadcaster, and Dafne Salati, a pianist, Rocco Filippini began his musical training at an early age. Of decisive importance was his meeting with Pierre Fournier, who became his teacher along with Professor Franz Walter of the Geneva Conservatory. It was from the Geneva Conservatory that Rocco Filippini received his diploma at the age of 17, being awarded the Premier Prix de Virtuosité, an accolade not given for the previous 36 years. He continued to perfect his playing with his teachers, who came to include the violinist Corrado Romano. At the age of 23, he won the Geneva International Music Competition and embarked on his performing career.

With a wide musical repertory, from Baroque to contemporary works, Rocco Filippini has played in the main concert halls of Europe, North and South America, Australia and Japan, and at numerous well-known festivals. In 1968, with Bruno Canino and Cesare Ferraresi, he founded the Trio di Milano, which was subsequently joined by the violinist Mariana Sîrbu. He was a founder member in 1992 of the Quartetto Accardo. He has performed in numerous concerts at the La Scala theatre in Milan, where he has played in recitals with cello and piano, performed the György Ligeti concerto with the Scala Philharmonic Orchestra, and taken part in many chamber music concerts, often in association with Maurizio Pollini, with whom he has performed concert programmes for several years in Rome, London, Tokyo and New York, and at the Rossini Opera Festival in Pesaro and Salzburg festivals. At the Salzburg Festival in 2002, he premièred Fabio Vacchi's Tre Veglie, with Anna Caterina Antonacci, accompanied by the Orchestre de Paris conducted by Ivan Fischer.

In 1979, he was appointed cello professor at the Giuseppe Verdi Conservatory in Milan. In 2003, he was invited by Luciano Berio to hold the chair of specialisation courses at the Accademia Nazionale di Santa Cecilia in Rome. In 1985, together with Salvatore Accardo, Bruno Giuranna and Franco Petracchi, he founded the Walter Stauffer Academy in Cremona. Since its inception, the academy for players of stringed instruments has attracted over eight hundred young people from many different countries, and was awarded the Franco Abbiati Music Critics prize in 2000. Rocco Filippini was repeatedly invited by Rudolf Serkin to the Marlboro Music Festival and to the Music from Marlboro concert series.

Some of today's leading composers have dedicated works to him: Franco Donatoni, Ala; Luciano Berio, Elaborazione per violoncello e contrabbasso based on his duets for two violins; Giovanni Sollima, The Songlines; Salvatore Sciarrino, Il paese senz'alba. Rocco Filippini performed the première of Salvatore Sciarrino's Trio no. 2 at the Concertgebouw in Amsterdam in 1987, and in 2003 he conducted Sciarrino's Cadenzario performed by the Giuseppe Verdi Orchestra of Milan.

Rocco Filippini has edited works from the cello repertory for Ricordi: Bach Suites, Popper 40 Studies op. 73, Servais 6 Caprices op. 11 and Piatti 12 Caprices op.25 and has published arrangements of Wagner's Wesendonck Lieder and De Falla's Siete Canciones Populares Españolas. His many recordings include discs for RCA, Fonè, Nuova Era, Assai, Fonit Cetra Italia, Amadeus, Ricordi, Symphonia, Dynamic, etc.

He played the Gore Booth Stradivarius (1710).

He had three sons, including photographer Cosimo Filippini. Filippini died from COVID-19 in April 2021, aged 77, during the COVID-19 pandemic in Switzerland.

== Awards and recognition ==
- 1967 - Prize for the best soloist of the year, Swiss musicians' association
- 1995 - Academician of the Accademia Nazionale di Santa Cecilia, Rome
- 2001 - Prize of the Banca della Svizzera italiana Centenario Foundation for his contribution to cultural relations between Switzerland and Italy
- 2010 - Emeritus Professor of the Milan Conservatory
