= Camerata Bern =

Located in Bern, Switzerland, the Camerata Bern was founded in 1963 as a conductorless, flexible chamber orchestra. The Camerata Bern performs early Baroque to contemporary classical music. The group tours extensively worldwide and is releasing CD recordings regularly.

The artistic partners of the Camerata Bern as of the season 2023-24 are Patricia Kopatchinskaja, Steven Isserlis and Sergio Azzolini and the fifteen members are:

Violin
Claudia Ajmone-Marsan
Michael Brooks Reid
Meesun Hong Coleman
Suyeon Kang
Sibylla Leuenberger
Christina Merblum Bollschweiler
Hyunjong Reents-Kang
Sonja Starke

Viola
Alejandro Mettler
Friedemann Jähnig
Anna Puig-Torné

Cello
Thomas Kaufmann
Martin Merker

Double bass
Käthi Steuri

Harpsichord
Vital Julian Frey
