= Kadri Tali =

Estonian conductor

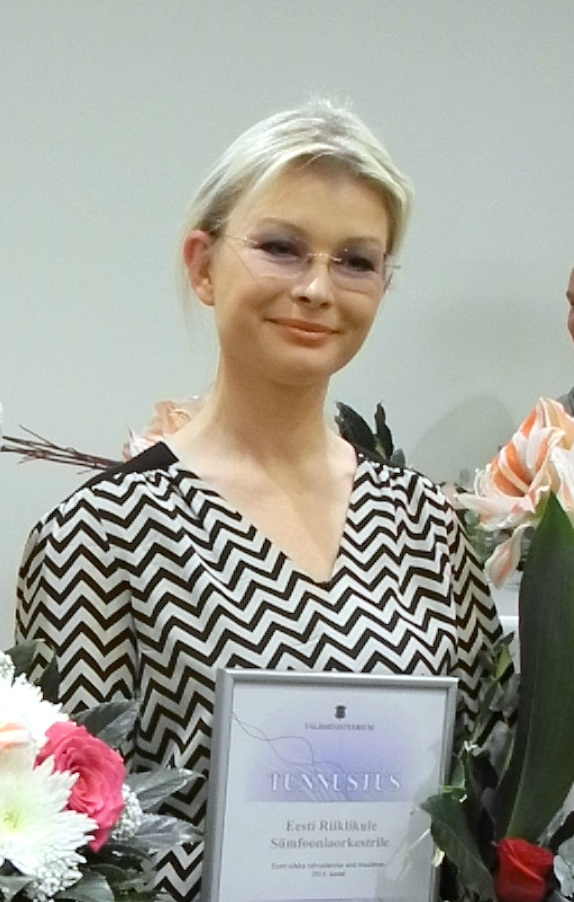
Kadri Tali

Kadri Tali (born on 18 June 1972 in Tallinn) is an Estonian music manager who is serving as a member of the 25th Riigikogu since 2023, elected as a member of Estonia 200.

== Life and career ==
In 1996 she graduated from Estonian Academy of Music and Theatre in choir conducting speciality.

1992-2002 she conducted the choir Ellerhein. In 1997, with her sister, she founded the Nordic Symphony Orchestra.

She was the director of the Estonian National Symphony Orchestra from 2011-2015.

Her mother is mathematician Anne Tali. She has a twin sister, Anu Tali, who is also a conductor.
