= Michael Hill (jeweller) =

New Zealand businessman (1938–2025)

Sir Michael Hill KNZM
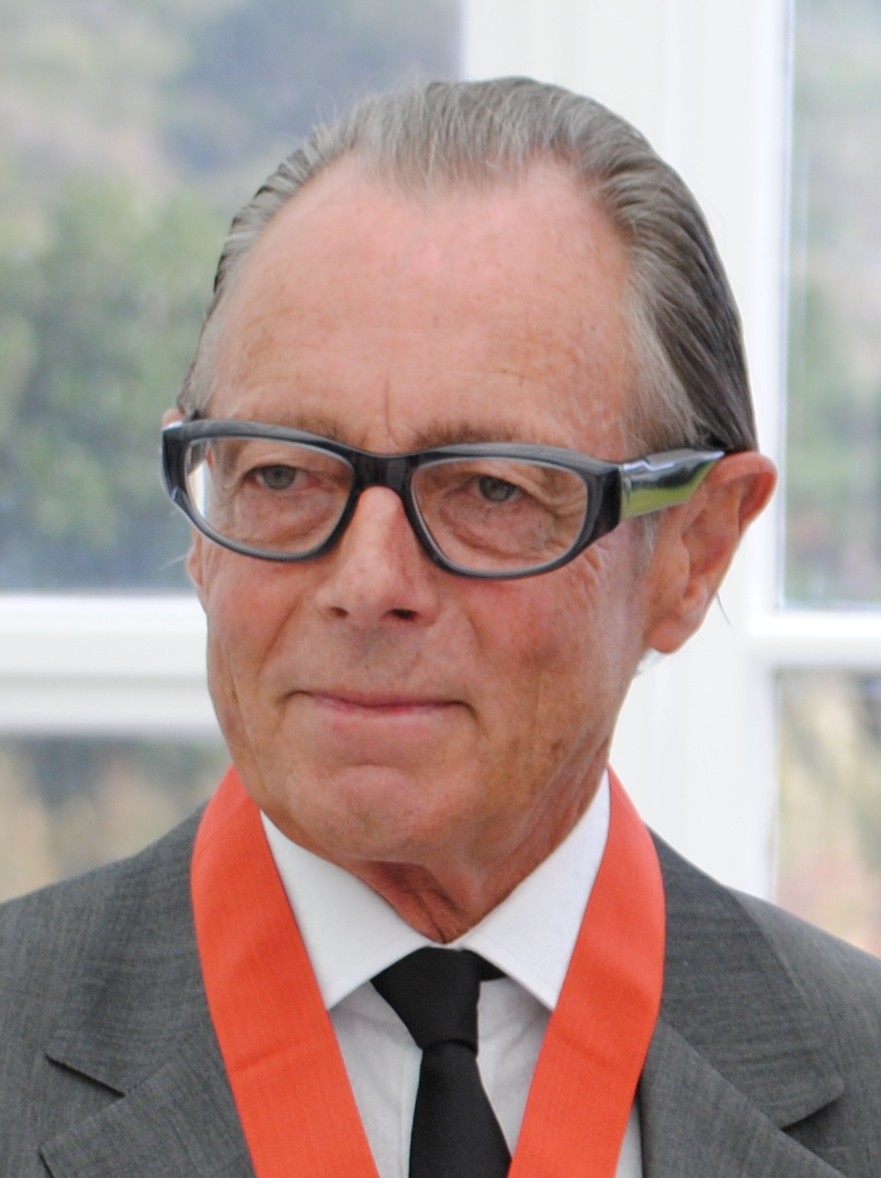
- Hill in 2011
- Born: Richard Michael Hill; 23 December 1938; Whangārei, New Zealand
- Died: 29 July 2025 (aged 86); Arrowtown, New Zealand
- Occupations: Jeweller; businessman
- Years active: 1948-2025
- Known for: Founder of Michael Hill Jeweller
- Spouse: Ann Christine Roe (m. 1965)
- Children: 2
- Awards: CNZM (2002); KNZM (2011); New Zealand Business Hall of Fame (2006)

Sir Richard Michael Hill KNZM (23 December 1938 – 29 July 2025) was a New Zealand jeweller, businessman and philanthropist who founded global jewellery retailer Michael Hill Jeweller in 1979. He retired as the company's chairman in November 2015. He resided in Arrowtown. He was an inductee of the New Zealand Business Hall of Fame and was named Ernst & Young's 2008 Entrepreneur of the Year in New Zealand.

In 2002, he was honoured with the New Zealand Order of Merit.

== Early life and career ==
Hill was born in Whangārei on 23 December 1938, and was educated at Whangārei Boys' High School from 1949 to 1954. Hill recalled being bullied, stating that he "hated" his time at school. He left school at 16 to pursue a career as a concert violinist but a year later was told he would have had to start much younger in life to be a noteworthy musician. Hill abandoned his hopes of a career in music and started working for his uncle, Arthur Fisher, at the family jewellery store. He performed well as a salesman and window dresser, winning international awards for his efforts in the latter. He later took over the store's newspaper and radio advertising, drawing attention to the business with bizarre themes for the advertisements.

In the spring of 1964, while working in the store, Hill met Christine Roe, an Englishwoman who taught art at a local high school. They married in March 1965 and had two children, Mark (born 1969) and Emma (born 1971).

== Michael Hill Jeweller ==
On 1 October 1977, the house that had taken them four years to build was destroyed in a fire. Following this setback, Hill re-assessed his life. With the help of a friend, he tried to buy his uncle's business, but the uncle refused to sell. On 13 May 1979, Hill opened his own jewellery store nearby, calling it Michael Hill Jeweller. One of his main points of difference was to limit his store's product range to jewellery items, dispensing with silverware, clocks, porcelain and glassware commonly found in other jewellery stores at the time.

Hill had set himself a goal of "seven stores in seven years", and in 1986 he exceeded that, opening his eighth store in Newmarket. On 9 June 1987, Hill floated Michael Hill Jeweller on the New Zealand Stock Exchange, raising enough capital to expand the business locally and into the Australian market, where the company opened four stores in Brisbane later that year. In 1988, Hill set himself and his company another goal: "70 shops in seven years". This goal was also achieved. In 2002, the goal of opening 1000 stores by 2022 was established by Hill, with the further aim of taking the brand global. During that same year, the company opened its first three stores in Canada, and by the end of 2009 the company had 242 stores in Australia, Canada, New Zealand and the United States.

Hill's daughter, Emma Hill, succeeded him as chairman after the November 2015 annual general meeting.

== Philanthropy ==
Although he did not become a concert violinist, Hill maintained a strong love for the violin his entire life and continued to play. In 2001 he founded the biennial Michael Hill International Violin Competition "for emerging young violinists". The winner of the competition receives a substantial cash prize, a recording deal for international distribution and a "Winner's Tour" in which the competition winner performs in concert halls around New Zealand and Australia in the calendar year following the competition.

== The Hills golf course ==
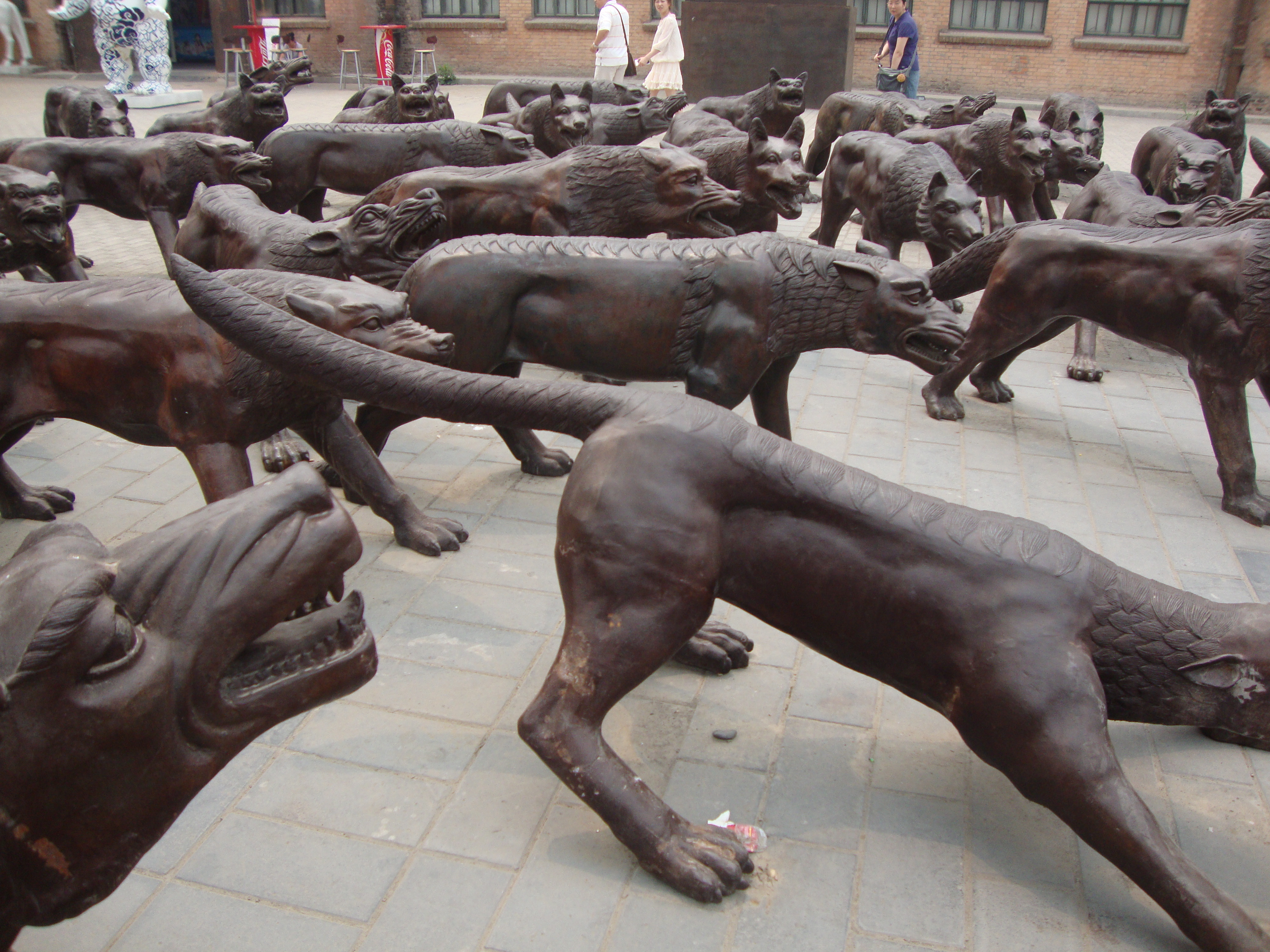
The Wolves are Coming—when installed at 798 Art Zone

After buying a run-down farm in Arrowtown, Hill's interest in golf grew to the point where he built his own 18-hole golf course called "The Hills" on the property. Built into the course is a unique two-thirds underground clubhouse designed by Auckland architect Andrew Patterson and his company, Patterson Associates. The clubhouse won the New Zealand Institute of Architects Supreme Architectural Award in 2008 and was a finalist in the World Architecture Festival in 2008 in Barcelona.

The course is notable for sculptures which make much of the course into an open-air gallery. Giant sculptures dot the course, many of them the work of Hill's son, sculptor Mark Hill.

Hill had The Wolves are Coming by Chinese sculptor Liu Ruowang installed. Originally on display at 798 Art Zone in Beijing, the 110 larger-than-life wolf statues were placed at the golf course in October 2012 on a site chosen by the artist, and not at the site prepared by Hill's staff. At the centre of the installation is a sword-wielding warrior; this piece alone weighs 3 tonnes (3.3 tons).

Hill also commissioned Max Patté to create a work for The Hills. The piece, which was unveiled on 12 May 2013, consists of five cast-iron horses, each of which is 2.6m high, 3m long and weighs 1.5 tonnes. Patté modelled the sculptures in clay. The clay models were scanned and the data sent to a foundry in China. The foundry made full-scale polystyrene models which Patté then covered in a plasticine skin to add finishing details. The foundry then cast the horses in iron and they were shipped to New Zealand.

=== New Zealand Open ===
The 2007, 2009 and 2010 New Zealand Open golf tournaments were held at The Hills.

== VvS1 yacht ==
In April 2007, Hill launched the VvS1, a 112-foot (34 m) super yacht built for luxury charters in the South Pacific. Designed by Hill and his wife, Christine, the vessel won three awards in the 2008 World Yacht Awards in Cannes: Best Motor Yacht, Best Interior and Best Functionality.

== Illness and death ==
In April 2025, Hill underwent cancer treatment. He died at his home in Arrowtown on 29 July 2025, at the age of 86.

== Books ==
Hill had three books published about succeeding in business. The books use stories from his own life to illustrate his points about achieving success.

- HELLO – Michael Hill Jeweller was published by Penguin Books in 1994.
- Toughen Up: What I've Learned About Surviving Tough Times was published by Random House in 2009.
- Think BIGGER: How to Raise Your Expectations and Achieve Everything was published by Random House in 2010.

== Recognition ==
Hill was awarded the New Zealand 1990 Commemoration Medal. In the 2002 New Year Honours, Hill was appointed a Companion of the New Zealand Order of Merit, for services to business and the arts. He was promoted to Knight Companion of the same order in the 2011 New Year Honours, also for services to business and the arts.

In 2006, Hill was inducted into the New Zealand Business Hall of Fame.

Hill received Ernst & Young New Zealand's Entrepreneur of the Year award in 2008. The awards "acknowledge the accomplishments of entrepreneurs and celebrate the contribution they are making to New Zealand's economy and society". Also in 2024, Michael Hill received an honour from his old high school, Whangarei Boys High School, where he was inducted into the Fideliter Fellowship.
