= Mariana Sîrbu =

Romanian musician (died 2023)

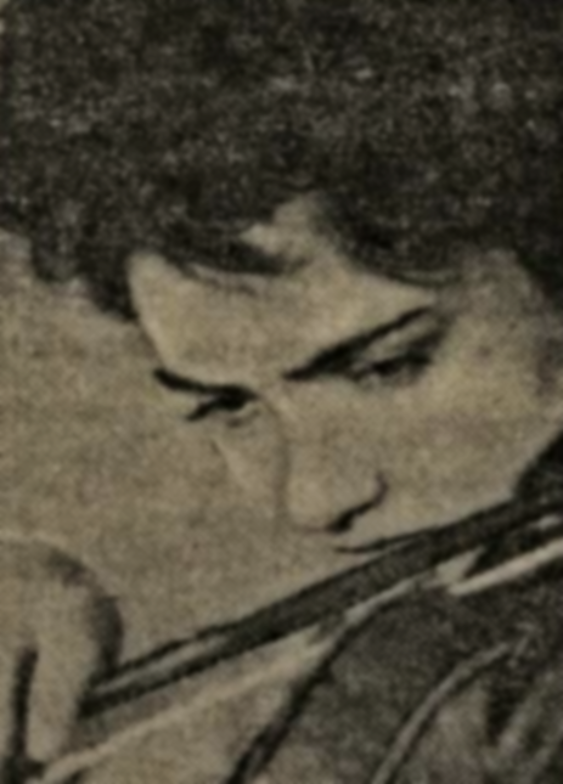
- Sîrbu in 1970
- Born: September 1949; Iași, Romanian People's Republic
- Died: 1 August 2023 (aged 74)
- Occupations: Classical violinist; academic teacher
- Organizations: Cvartetul Academica; Trio di Milano; I Musici; Quartetto Stradivari; University of Music and Theatre Leipzig

Mariana Sîrbu (1948 or 1949 – 1 August 2023), also credited as Sârbu, was a Romanian classical violinist and academic teacher, who made an international career performing and recording. She was focused on chamber music, founding the Academica String Quartet in 1968, joining the Trio di Milano in 1985, and founding the Quartetto Stradivari in 1994. She was concertmaster of I Musici from 1993 to 2003. She became professor of violin at the University of Music and Theatre Leipzig in Leipzig in 2002, gave international master classes and was juror for competitions of violin and chamber music.

== Biography ==
=== Origins and early life ===
Sîrbu was born in 1948 or 1949 in the city of Iași, Romanian People's Republic. She started playing the violin under the supervision of her parents; her father, schoolteacher Gheorghe Sîrbu, reportedly taught her in the "Russian violin manner". She then went on to study professionally in her native city, at the Octav Băncilă Elementary and Medium School of Music and Arts. She took her first award locally, in 1956, and, as noted by music critic George Pascu, impressed the public with her "major qualities." In April 1962, Sîrbu performed with seven of her schoolmates at the Romanian Athenaeum student gala. She won an award for her "beautiful and clean" rendition of Saint-Saëns's Introduction and Rondo Capriccioso. Her debut in concert was in 1966, at the Romanian Radio Broadcasting Company: she performed Mendelssohn's Violin Concerto, with Emanuel Elenescu as the conductor.

Graduating high school in summer 1967, Sîrbu initially enlisted at Iași Conservatory, and performed with her colleagues at that year's edition of the George Enescu Festival, taking third prize in the violin competition. She had also won an award presented by the Soviet Pioneer Organization; in June 1970, she took fourth prize at the Carl Flesch International Violin Competition in London. She went on to study with Ștefan Gheorghiu at the National University of Music Bucharest. During this time, Sîrbu learned to play the instrument "Western-style". Full international recognition began once she embarked on her concert career. She performed as a soloist in great concert halls such as Berliner Philharmonie, Teatro Colón in Buenos Aires, Sydney Opera House, Wiener Musikverein, Concertgebouw in Amsterdam, Carnegie Hall and Lincoln Center in New York City, Teatro alla Scala in Milan and Suntory Hall in Tokyo. Additionally, she continued to take part in various international music festivals.

=== Chamber music ===
In 1967, while still studying in Bucharest, Sîrbu was a founder of the Cvartetul Academica (Academica String Quartet), with violinist Ruxandra Colan, violist Constantin Zanidache, and cellist Mihai Dăncilă. The ensemble toured in many countries, and made recordings. With the quartet, she was a prize-winner at international competitions including Liège in 1972, Munich in 1973, Geneva in 1974 and Belgrade in 1975. From 1979, the quartet was based in Ireland, with Sîrbu also joining the similar house quartet of RTÉ Radio 1.

In 1985, Sîrbu joined the Trio di Milano, along with Bruno Canino as the pianist and Rocco Filippini as the cellist. She was concertmaster of the I Musici chamber orchestra from 1993 to 2003, touring and recording. In 1994 she participated in establishing the Quartetto Stradivari, as the first violinist, with Cristina Dăncilă, Massimo Paris, and Mihai Dăncilă. Sîrbu played a Stradivarius violin, "Conte di Fontana". Made in 1702, it had been previously played by the Russian maestro David Oistrakh.

=== Teaching ===
After graduating from university, Sîrbu worked for several years as Gheorghiu's assistant in Bucharest. She later taught at the Scuola di Musica di Fiesole in Florence. She gave master classes in France, Ireland, Italy, Netherlands, Spain, Switzerland, the Banff Centre in Canada, in China and Japan. In September 2001, she returned to her native Romania to perform once again at the Enescu Festival, earning praise for her since-acquired expertise in Baroque music. From 2002 she was professor of violin at the University of Music and Theatre Leipzig in Leipzig. Among her students there was Ioana Cristina Goicea, from 2012 to 2015. She was visiting professor at the Irish World Academy of Music and Dance at the University of Limerick, Ireland. She taught at the Corsi di Perfezionamento strumentale in Sermoneta from 2002 to 2018.

Sîrbu was member of several international juries for competitions such as the Concorso Internazionale Triennale di Liuteria in Cremona, the Concorso Vittorio Gui in Florence, the chamber music competition Concorso Lorenzi in Trieste, the string quartet competitions in Évian-les-Bains and Bordeaux, and the violin section of the Enescu Festival (Bucharest).

=== Personal life ===
Sîrbu was married to her cellist colleague Mihai Dăncilă; they had a daughter, who performed as a violinist under her father's family name. The family moved to the West in 1977. Husband and wife played in the Quartetto Academica; and all three played in the Quartetto Stradivari.

Sîrbu died on 1 August 2023.

== Recordings ==
Many of Sîrbu's performances have been recorded, including Beethoven's Violin Sonatas and his Triple Concerto, Enescu's three Violin Sonatas with pianist Mihail Sârbu, and twelve of Vivaldi's Violin Concertos. An album of these, which also involved the rest of I Musici, was recorded in 1995 by Philips. According to writer Miklós Fáy, it proved disappointing: "Despite the skill of the new first violinist, Mariana Sîrbu, this style, this kind of understanding and interpretation of Vivaldi is completely out of date."

Sîrbu also recorded The Four Seasons with I Musici, as many violinists (including Federico Agostini) had done; a reviewer from Gramophone found her as incisive, and her lines in the slow movements "more finely and imaginatively nuanced". Her recording of the twelve concertos for solo violin of Locatelli's L'arte del violino, the composer's magnum opus, were regarded as the reference recording for the piece by a reviewer from Classics Today who noted her "unparalleled virtuosity and sheer sonic splendor".

- Vivaldi: Violin Concertos (1995); The Four Seasons and two more violin concertos (1997)—both with I Musici
- Enescu: Violin Sonatas
- Franck: Chamber Works

== Competitions ==
Sîrbu achieved prizes at international competitions including:

- George Enescu Prize (Bucharest)
- Carl Flesch International Violin Competition (London)
- Maria Canals International Music Competition (Barcelona)
- Vittorio Gui Prize (Florence)
