= Max Patté =

British artist

- Born: England
- Known for: painting; sculpture; multimedia
- Website: maxpatte.com

Max Patté is a British artist known for his sculptures and for multimedia work using changing light and colour.

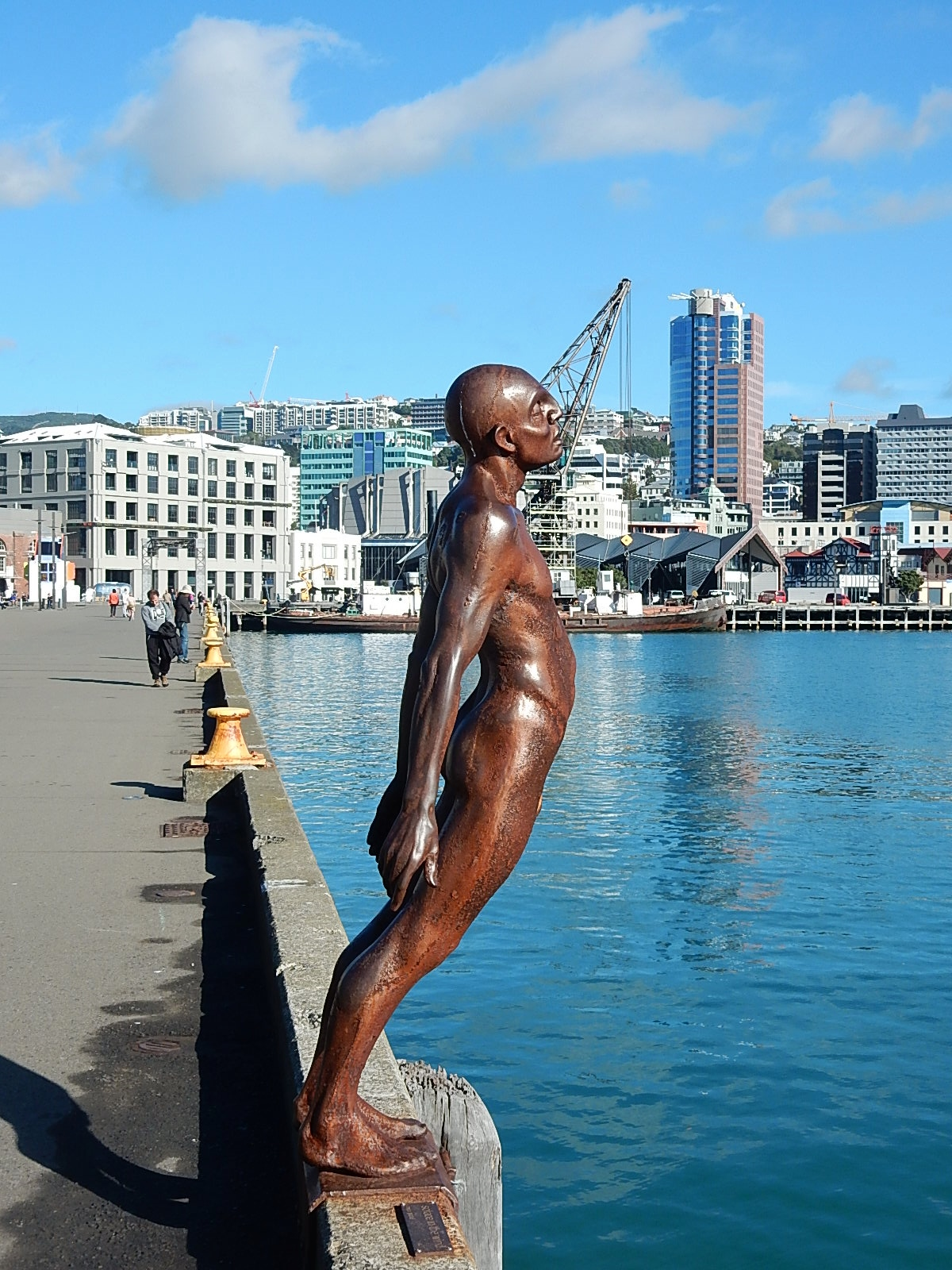
Solace in the Wind, Wellington

== Early life ==
Patté was born in 1977 and raised in Gloucestershire. His father was a farm machinery importer and exporter and his mother was a teacher. He studied at the Wimbledon School of Art in London from 1997–2000, switching from studying fine arts sculpture to technical arts during his time there. He then worked with Animated Extras, a company that makes prosthetics and animatronics for films, and sculptor Julian Murray, working on films including Batman Begins, Harry Potter, and The Last Samurai. He made the Batman suit worn by Christian Bale in Batman Begins.

== Career in New Zealand ==
Patté moved from London to New Zealand in 2006 following a marriage break up. He joined Weta Workshop and became head of sculpture there, with Sir Richard Taylor becoming his patron. Taylor lent Patté studio space to create his sculpture Solace in the Wind. Patté was elected as an associate of the Royal British Society of Sculptors (now the Royal Society of Sculptors) in 2008. During his time at Weta, Patté worked on the Lord of the Rings trilogy and the "Scale of our War" Gallipoli exhibition at the Museum of New Zealand Te Papa Tongarewa, and in 2009 he was one of the judges of the World of Wearable Art Awards. In 2012 Charles Saatchi commissioned life-sized busts of himself and his then wife Nigella Lawson. During his stay in New Zealand, Patté married Amy Fitzgerald and had two children. In 2022 Patté and his family left New Zealand for Mallorca in Spain, in order to be closer to family and a bigger market for Patté's work. Besides his sculptures in bronze, iron and other materials, Patté creates light works, multimedia pieces that use colour and light to evoke response.

== Notable works ==
=== Solace in the wind ===
Patté's first public sculpture, Solace in the Wind, was installed as a temporary loan in Wellington, New Zealand in 2008. The sculpture is made of cast iron and depicts a naked man with his eyes closed, leaning into the wind. Patte has stated that it represents his feelings about his time in New Zealand and thoughts about leaving Wellington. The sculpture won the People's Choice Award for favourite sculpture at the Wellington Civic Trust Awards in 2008, leading the City Council to buy it for $60,000. People sometimes decorate the statue with clothes or hats. In 2018 Patté created 50 small-scale replicas of the statue to celebrate its 10-year anniversary.

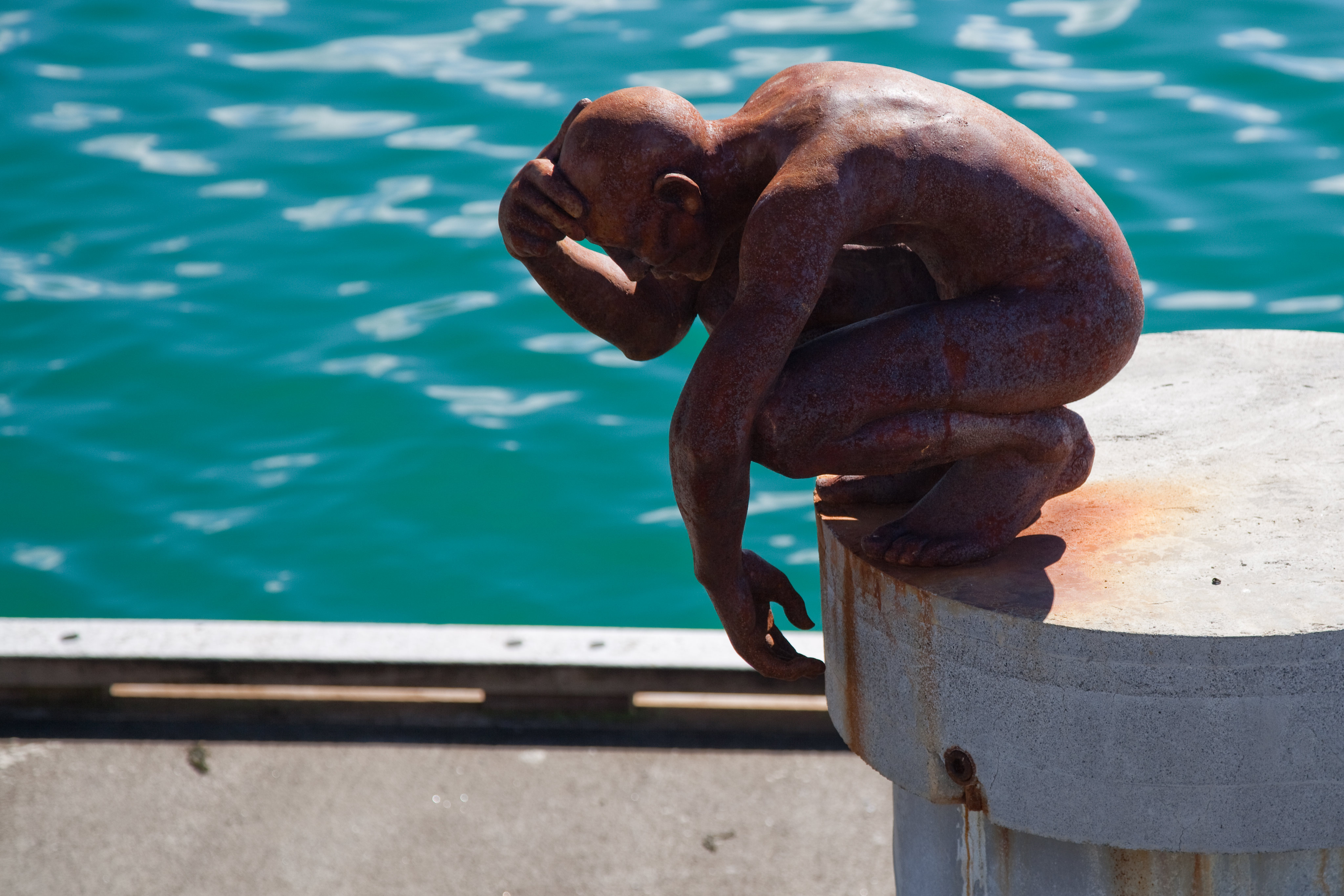
Reflection, Wellington 2010 (now in London)

=== Reflection ===
In 2009 Patté created Reflection, a cast-iron sculpture of a man crouched on a ledge. The man's eyes are closed, so he is not looking at his own reflection but rather reflecting on something in his life. The sculpture was lent to Wellington for three months and installed on a pillar at the edge of Whairepo lagoon in Frank Kitts Park. Patté offered to donate the sculpture to the city, but Wellington Waterfront (a Wellington City Council organisation that managed Wellington's waterfront area) declined the offer. It was then bought by Sir Ian McKellen and installed at his home beside the Thames in London. Guillermo del Toro has another version at his home in Los Angeles.

=== The Frolic and the Fancy ===
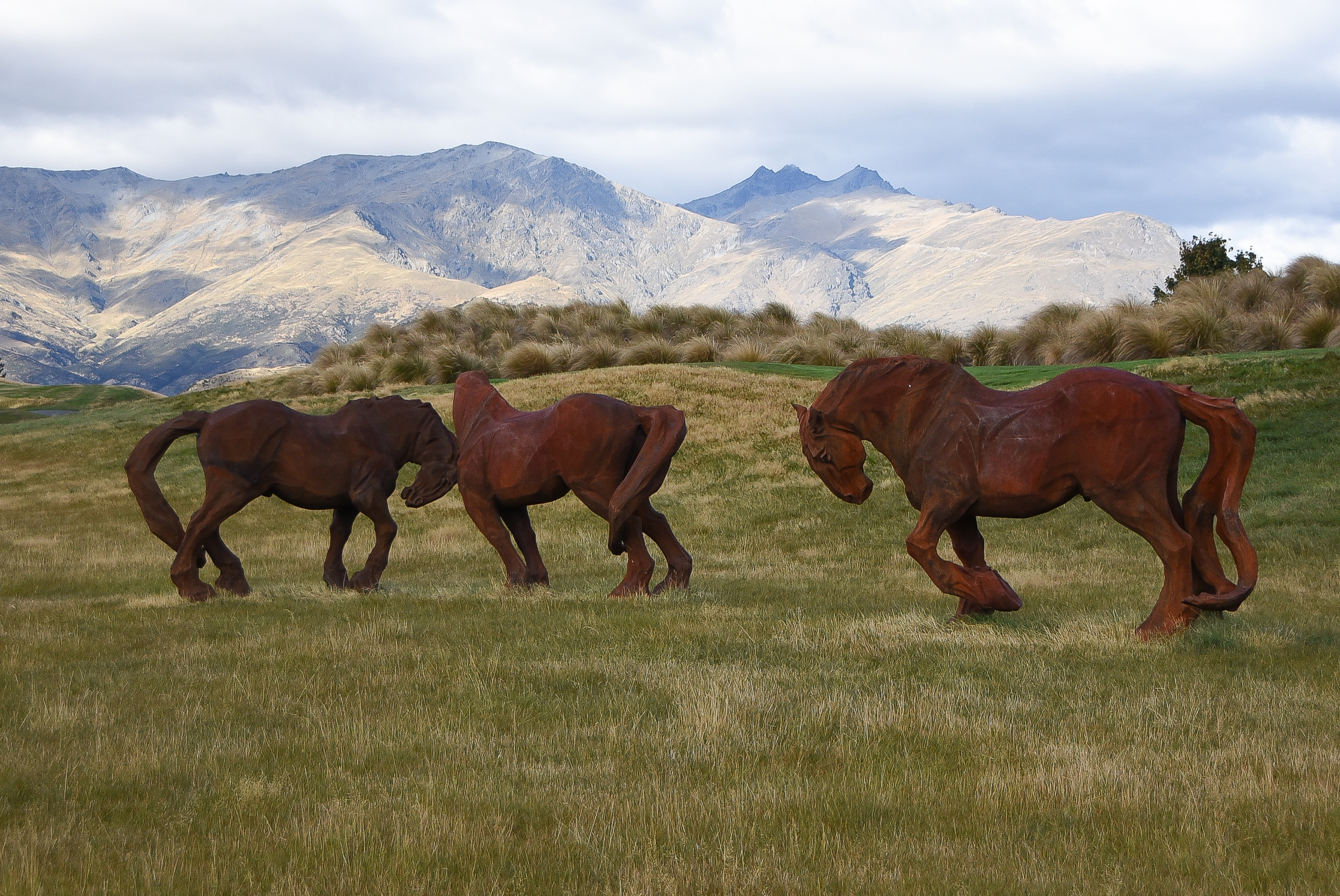
The Frolic and the Fancy, The Hills, Queenstown

Sir Michael Hill commissioned Patté to create a work for his private golf course 'The Hills' near Queenstown, New Zealand. The piece, which was unveiled on 12 May 2013, consists of five cast-iron horses, each of which is 2.6m high, 3m long and weighs 1.5 tonnes. Patté made several trips to Staglands Wildlife Reserve to sketch Clydesdale horses then modelled the sculptures in clay. The clay models were scanned and the data sent to a foundry in China. The foundry made full-scale polystyrene models which Patté then covered in a plasticine skin to add finishing details. The foundry then cast the horses in iron and they were shipped to New Zealand.
