= Michael Hill International Violin Competition =

International violin competition

- Formation: 2001
- Founder: Michael Hill
- Purpose: Classical music competition
- Executive Director: Anne Rodda
- Website: michaelhillviolincompetition.co.nz

The Michael Hill International Violin Competition is a biennial music competition for violinists aged between 18 and 28. It was founded by Michael Hill in 2001 as the Michael Hill World Violin Competition. Hill remains a major sponsor, claiming that "It is my dream that New Zealand will one day become a much more balanced society with not just wonderful sport – but also wonderful classical music." In 2004, the event became a member of the World Federation of International Music Competitions.

The event is held in New Zealand, with the first two semi-final rounds of competition conducted in Queenstown and the third and final rounds held in Auckland. There is a total prize pool of NZ$100,000, with the winner receiving $40,000. In 2009, the events gained about $500,000 worth of sponsorship.

Special guests at the competition have included Prime Minister of New Zealand Helen Clark, and Minister for Arts, Culture and Heritage Christopher Finlayson.

== Laureates ==
Year	First prize	Second prize	Third prize	Fourth prize	Fifth prize	Sixth prize
2001	(United States) (Taiwan) Joseph Lin	(Russia) Tatiana Samouil	(Australia) Alexandra Osborne			
2003	Natalia Lomeiko, Russia	(Australia) Kristian Winther	(Germany) Korbinian Altenberger			
2005	Feng Ning, China	(United States) Yvonne Lam	(Poland) Bartosz Woroch			
2007	(Bulgaria) Bella Hristova	(Dominica) Yuuki Wong	(Germany) Stefan Hempel			
2009	(Czech Republic) Josef Špaček	(South Korea) Yoo Jin Jang	(South Korea) Danbi Um	(United States) Tessa Lark	(United States) David McCarroll	(South Korea) Dami Kim
2011	(Russia) Sergey Malov	(Taiwan) Richard Lin	(China) Xiang Yu	(Uzbekistan) Nadir Khashimov	(United States) Eric Silberger	(United States) Stefani Collins
2013	(Canada) Nikki Chooi	(Germany) Sarah Christian	(Canada) Boson Mo	(South Korea) Wonyoung Jung	(Romania) Ioana Cristina Goicea	(New Zealand) Natalie Lin
2015	(Australia) Suyeon Kang	(South Korea) Eunae Koh	(Canada) Timothy Chooi	(United States) (Japan) Natsumi Tsuboi	(United States) (South Korea) Elly Suh	(Austria) Marie-Christine Klettner
2017	(Romania) Ioana Cristina Goicea	(United States) Luke Hsu	(New Zealand) Benjamin Baker	(Czech Republic) Olga Šroubková	(Switzerland) Sumina Studer	(South Korea) Kunwha Lee
2019	(South Korea) Anna Do Gyung Im	(United States) Eric Tsai	(Latvia) Jevgēnijs Čepoveckis	(Hong Kong) Angela Sin Ying Chan	(United States) Hannah Cho	(Australia) Victoria Wong
2023	(South Korea) (United States) Yeyeong Jin	(United States) (Germany) Claire Wells	(Sweden) (Austria) Lorenz Karls	(Canada) (United States) Gabrielle Després	(Ukraine) (Germany) Eva Rabchevska	(Japan) (Germany) Aoi Saito
2026	(Italy) (Australia) Beatrice Colombis	(China) Tianyou Ma	(Germany) (Ukraine) Jakow Pavlenko	(South Korea) Hyein Koo	(China) Julia-Xiaohuo Wang	(China) Xunyue Zhang
