= Bartosz Woroch =

Bartosz Woroch (born 27 September 1984) is a Polish-born violinist and prize winner at major international competitions such as the Pablo Sarasate in Pamplona, Spain, in 2003 and the 2005 Michael Hill International Violin Competition in New Zealand.

== Early life ==
Born in 1984 in Poznań, Poland, Woroch studied at the Paderewski Academy of Music in his home town with Marcin Baranowski. He was awarded a scholarship by the Swiss Government in 2008 to further his studies at the University of the Arts Bern with Monika Urbaniak-Lisik.

== Career ==
At the age of 22 Bartosz was appointed concertmaster to the Poznan Philharmonic Orchestra. He left this position two years later to focus more on solo and chamber music performances which led to recitals in London at Wigmore Hall and the Barbican Centre, the Centre for Fine Arts, Brussels, the Festival de Radio France et Montpellier, the Edinburgh Festival Fringe, Verbier Festival in Switzerland, and West Cork Chamber Music Festival in Ireland. He has also toured New Zealand, Australia, Malaysia and Singapore. In 2009 he continued his studies with a fellowship at the Guildhall School of Music and Drama (GSMD) in London in the class of cellist Louise Hopkins. From 2011 until 2015 he was supported by the Young Classical Artists Trust (YCAT).

== Recordings ==
- 2016: Dancer on a Tightrope (Bacewicz, Hindemith, Gubaidulina, Prokofiev, Schnittke, Cage), with Mei Yi Foo; Champs Hill Records
- 2017: ConNotations (Shostakovich, Berg, Saint-Saëns), with the Britten Sinfonia and Mei Yi Foo; Orchid Classics
