= Timothy Chooi =

Canadian violinist (born 1994)

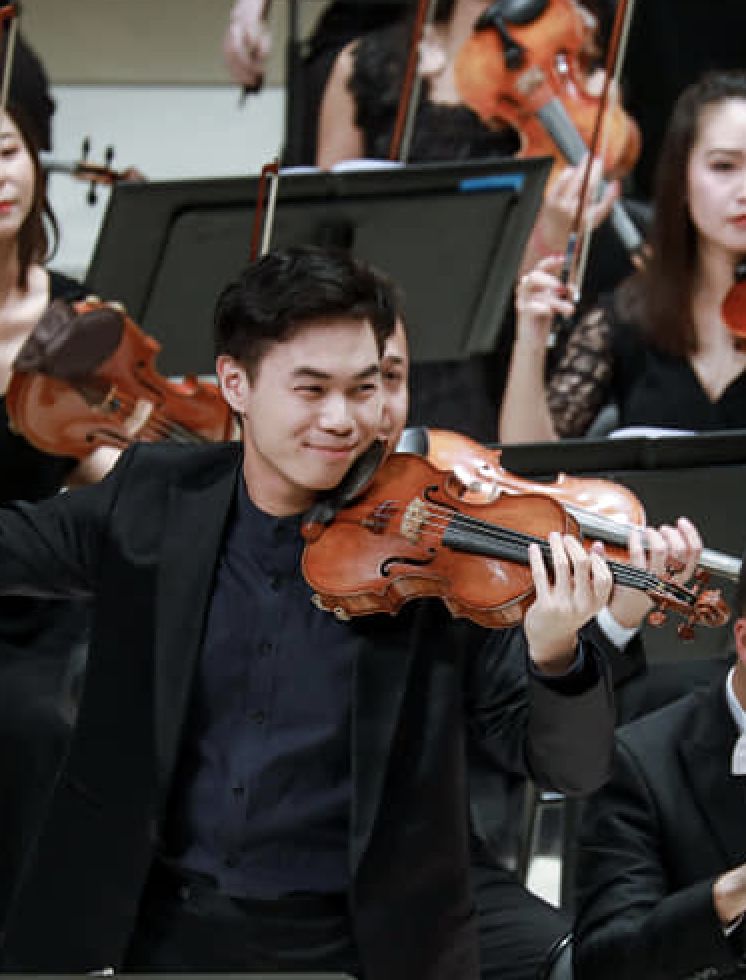
- Timothy Chooi with the Sichuan Symphony Orchestra in Chengdu, China
- Born: 17 December 1993 (age 32); Victoria, British Columbia, Canada
- Occupation: Violinist
- Known for: Queen Elisabeth Competition, 2nd prize; International Joseph Joachim Violin Competition, 1st prize
- Relatives: Nikki Chooi (brother)
- Musical career
- Genre: Classical
- Instruments: 1714 "Dolphin" Stradivarius, 1741 "Titan" Guarneri del Gesù violin, 1761 Landolfi violin
- Years active: 2010–present
- Website: www.timothychooi.com

Timothy Chooi (Chinese: 徐任良; pinyin: Xú Rèn-liáng; born Ren-Liang Xu) is a Chinese-Canadian-American violinist and professor at the University of Ottawa. He gained international recognition after winning First Prize at the 2018 International Joseph Joachim Violin Competition and Second Prize at the 2019 Queen Elisabeth Competition. He is also a prizewinner of the International Yehudi Menuhin Violin Competition and the Michael Hill International Violin Competition, and received the Grand Prize at the 2010 Montreal ManuLife Competition. He has performed internationally as a soloist and leader and in 2026, he was appointed Artistic Partner of the Wiener Concert-Verein.

== Early life and education ==
Timothy (Timmy) Chooi was born in Victoria, British Columbia, where he spent his early childhood. He was raised in a family of Chinese descent who immigrated from Indonesia, and during his youth, his family also spent time in the United States, where his father worked in Florida. He later attended high school in Philadelphia, Pennsylvania, where he completed his secondary education and graduated with top honors. He has one older brother, Nikki Chooi, a violinist who previously served as concertmaster of the Metropolitan Opera in New York City.

Chooi received his Bachelor of Music from the Curtis Institute of Music, where he studied with Ida Kavafian and Pamela Frank. He later earned a Master of Music and Artist Diploma from the Juilliard School, studying with Catherine Cho, and completed a Professional Studies diploma at the Kronberg Academy in Germany with Christian Tetzlaff. He has also studied privately with Pinchas Zukerman and Patinka Kopec, and his career has been supported by musicians including Anne-Sophie Mutter, with whom he has collaborated in performances and touring projects.

== Performing Career ==
Chooi began playing the violin at the age of three using the Suzuki method at the Victoria Conservatory of Music with Esther Tsang. He made his orchestral debut at the age of seven, performing with his brother and the Victoria Symphony Orchestra. In 2007, he was invited to perform with the Victoria Symphony Orchestra at the celebration concert "Splash" for an audience of over 50,000 people.

In 2010, he entered the Curtis Institute of Music in Philadelphia, where he studied with Ida Kavafian. Shortly thereafter, he was awarded the Grand Prize at the 2010 Montreal ManuLife Competition and made his concerto debut with the Montreal Symphony Orchestra under Jean-François Rivest. His performance was described as "the miracle violinist" by critic Claude Gingras.

In 2018, Chooi was awarded the Prix Yves Paternot at the Verbier Festival, becoming the first violinist and the first Canadian and American to receive the prize. The award included a cash prize and a series of concert appearances across Europe.

Chooi rose to international prominence after winning First Prize at the 2018 International Joseph Joachim Violin Competition in Hanover. He was the first Canadian to receive the top prize. In 2019, he was awarded Second Prize at the Queen Elisabeth Competition in Belgium, leading to concert engagements including performances with the Brussels Philharmonic under Stéphane Denève and recital appearances across Europe and Asia.

He has since performed internationally with orchestras including the Royal Philharmonic Orchestra, NDR Radiophilharmonie, Deutsches Symphonie-Orchester Berlin, Brussels Philharmonic, Chicago Symphony Orchestra, National Arts Centre Orchestra, Toronto Symphony Orchestra, Auckland Philharmonia, Montreal Symphony Orchestra, Santa Barbara Symphony, and the Sichuan Symphony Orchestra, among others.

In addition to his orchestral appearances, Chooi is active as a recitalist and chamber musician, performing across Europe, North America, and Asia. He has collaborated with artists and conductors including Gianandrea Noseda, Kent Nagano, Anne-Sophie Mutter, Pinchas Zukerman, Stéphane Denève, Lang Lang, Yuja Wang, Yoav Talmi, Jukka-Pekka Saraste, and Benjamin Zander. He has also collaborated with Anne-Sophie Mutter and the Mutter Virtuosi on international tours, performing at major concert halls including the Musikverein, Berlin Philharmonie, and Théâtre des Champs-Élysées. His performances have been noted for their intensity and technical command.

In 2026, Chooi was appointed Artistic Partner of the Wiener Concert-Verein, a Vienna-based chamber orchestra with musicians from the Vienna Symphony. The appointment followed an ongoing collaboration with the ensemble beginning in 2022. His first projects in the role included performing and directing Antonio Vivaldi's ''The Four Seasons'' at the Brahms-Saal of the Musikverein in Vienna, as well as performances in Aix-en-Provence and Grenoble.

== Teaching and academic work ==
Chooi joined the School of Music at the University of Ottawa in 2021 as Assistant Professor of Violin at the age of 27, becoming one of the youngest faculty members in the institution's history. In 2025, he was promoted to Associate Professor and appointed Head of Strings.

In the same year, he was awarded the University of Ottawa's Equity, Diversity and Inclusion Research Award for his work exploring new approaches to classical music and cultural engagement.

Chooi is a co-founder of the VISION Collective, an initiative established in 2018 focused on community outreach through music, particularly working with immigrant and refugee communities. The project has included performances and workshops in refugee communities in Europe and North America, and received the Robert Sherman Award for Music Education and Community Outreach from the Juilliard School.

In addition to his performing career, Chooi has given masterclasses and workshops internationally, engaging with students and young musicians through educational and outreach initiatives.

== Instruments ==
Chooi performs on several historic violins, including the 1741 "Titan" Guarneri del Gesù, on loan from Canimex of Drummondville, Quebec since 2023; the 1714 "Dolphin" Stradivarius, on loan from the Nippon Music Foundation, previously played by Jascha Heifetz and Ray Chen; and a 1761 Landolfi violin, provided through his position at the University of Ottawa.

== Awards ==
In 2010, Chooi was awarded the Grand Prize at the OSM Standard Life Competition (one of the youngest recipients in history).

- 2010 Grand Prize Winner of the Montreal ManuLife Competition, Montreal, Quebec, Canada
- 2012 Winner of the Canada Council for the Arts Musical Instrument Bank, Toronto, Ontario, Canada
- 2013 Recipient of the Vadim Repin Scholarship Award
- 2014 Laureate of the 2014 International Yehudi Menuhin Violin Competition
- 2015 Bronze Medal at the 2015 Michael Hill International Violin Competition
- 2015 Winner of the Canada Council for the Arts Music Instrument Bank
- 2017 Milka Violin Award from the Curtis Institute of Music
- 2018 First Prize Winner of the Schadt Violin Competition
- 2018 Winner of the Canada Council for the Arts Music Instrument Bank
- 2018 Recipient of the "Prix Yves Paternot" from the Verbier Festival in Switzerland
- 2018 First Prize Winner of the International Joseph Joachim Violin Competition
- 2019 Second Prize Winner of the Queen Elisabeth Competition
- 2021 Recipient of the Nippon Music Foundation Rare Instrument Loan
- 2022 Recipient of the Norman Benzaquen Career Advancement Grant from The Juilliard School in New York City
- 2022 Recipient of the Gershen Cohen Violin Award The Juilliard School in New York City
- 2025 Equity, Diversity and Inclusion Prize, University of Ottawa in Ottawa, Canada

== See also ==
- Nikki Chooi
- List of Stradivarius instruments
