= Trio Boccherini =

Classical music group

The Trio Boccherini is a classical chamber music group (violin, viola, cello) founded and based in Europe.

== History ==
The group was founded in Berlin in 2014. Since its formation the group has performed extensively in Europe, with some dates in Australia and the USA.

They have made several well-received string trio albums with BIS Records and Genuin Classics.

== Notable recordings ==
- Beethoven String Trios Volume I (op.9, 1-3, Genuin, 2019)
- Beethoven String Trios Volume II (op. 3&8, Genuin, 2021)
- Hungarian String Trios (BIS, 2024)
- 'Conversations à Trois'- Franco-Belgian string trios (BIS, upcoming in 2026)

== Members ==
Current members:

- Suyeon Kang, Korean-Australian violinist
- Vicki Powell, American violist
- Paolo Bonomini, Italian cellist

Previous members:

- Florian Peelman, Belgian-Australian violist (2014-2017)
