= Ioana Cristina Goicea =

Romanian violinist

- Born: 6 November 1992 (age 33); Bucharest, Romania
- Genres: Classical
- Occupation: Violinist
- Instrument: Violin
- Years active: 2010–present
- Website: http://www.cristinagoicea.com/

Ioana Cristina Goicea (born 6 November 1992 in Bucharest, Romania) is a Romanian-born violinist and Violin Professor at the University of Music and Performing Arts Vienna.

Goicea was born into a family of musicians. Her mother is the Romanian violinist Cristina Anghelescu and her grandfather was the violin pedagogue Aurelian Anghelescu Ioana Cristina Goicea studied in Bucharest at the "Dinu Lipatti" Music Highschool with Professors Radu Popescu and Rudolf Stamm as well as with Stefan Gheorgiu. Later on she studied at the Music Universities in Leipzig, Rostock and Hanover with Mariana Sîrbu, Petru Munteanu and Krzysztof Wegrzyn.

Goicea has performed in Europe, America, New Zealand, Australia and Asia at concert venues such as the Concertgebouw Amsterdam, St Martin-in-the-Fields London, Melbourne Recital Centre, Romanian Athenaeum, Shanghai Concert Hall, the Slovak Philharmonic and the Townhall Auckland. As a soloist she has performed with the Belgian National Orchestra, the Auckland Philharmonia, the George Enescu Philharmonic Bucharest, the National Radio Orchestra Bucharest, the Indianapolis Symphony, the Antwerp Symphony Orchestra, Orchestre Royal de Chambre de Wallonie, the Beethoven Orchestra Bonn and the Baden-Baden Philharmonic.

In addition to her career as a soloist, Goicea is also an active chamber musician. In 2015, together with pianist Andrei Banciu, she won Second Prize at the International Competition "Premio Trio di Trieste". In 2016 she participated in the Chamber Music Academy of the Heidelberger Frühling Music Festival. In 2017 she was invited to the Hitzacker Festival and its academy. In 2018 she took part in the Verbier Festival Academy.

Ioana Cristina Goicea plays a G.B. Guadagnini Violin (Parma, 1761), on loan from the German Music Instrument Fund – Deutsche Stiftung Musikleben.

Her debut CD "Recital" together with pianist Andrey Gugnin was released in early 2019 on New Zealand's Atoll Records Label.

Furthermore, the CD "Romantic Exuberance" was released on Genuin Label in 2019 together with Andrei Banciu in cooperation with the Deutschlandfunk and the German Music Competition.

In 2021 the CD "Aachener Walzer" was released on Naxos International together with Sinfonieorchester Aachen and Christopher Ward.

== Awards ==
- 2014: 5th Prize at the Fritz Kreisler International Violin Competition in Vienna, Austria
- 2017: 1st Prize at Michael Hill International Violin Competition in New Zealand
- 2018: 5th Prize at the International Violin Competition of Indianapolis
- 2018: 1st Prize at the Deutscher Musikwettbewerb in Bonn, Germany
- 2019: 6th Prize at the Queen Elisabeth Competition in Brussels, Belgium
