= Michael Hill Jeweller =

Australian multinational jewellery store chain

Michael Hill International Limited
- Trade name: Michael Hill Jeweller
- Type: Public
- Traded as: ASX: MHJ; NZX: MHJ
- Industry: Retail
- Founded: 1979 in Whangārei, New Zealand
- Headquarters: Brisbane, Queensland, Australia
- Number of locations: 300 (June 2024)
- Area served: Australia; New Zealand; Canada
- Key people: Michael Hill (Founder President); Rob Fyfe (Chairman); Jonathan Waecker (CEO)
- Products: Jewellery
- Brands: Michael Hill, Emma & Roe, Ten Seven Seven, Medley, Bevilles
- Revenue: ▲$489 million NZD (30 June 2011)
- Website: www.michaelhill.com.au (AU) www.michaelhill.co.nz (NZ) www.michaelhill.ca (CA)

Michael Hill International Ltd. is a specialty retailer of jewellery. As of June 2024, it operates 300 stores in Australia, New Zealand and Canada. The company employs approximately 2,600 permanent employees. Its headquarters are in Brisbane, Queensland.

== History ==
The company started in 1979, when Michael Hill and his wife, Christine, opened their first store in the New Zealand town of Whangārei. It gained national prominence due to its distinct store design, exclusive focus on jewellery and intensive advertising.

The company expanded to 10 stores by 1987, the same year it listed on the NZX. Also in this year, Michael Hill Jeweller expanded into Australia, opening four stores.

In 2000, Michael Hill Jeweller had 40 stores in New Zealand, including 12 in Auckland.

In 2002, the company expanded into Canada, opening its first stores in Vancouver, British Columbia. Michael Hill now has a presence in five Canadian provinces: British Columbia, Alberta, Saskatchewan, Manitoba and Ontario. In September 2008, the company entered the United States market by acquiring 17 stores in Illinois and Missouri from Whitehall Jewelers. By mid-2013 over 60% of overall sales were from Australia, only 20% from New Zealand, with the rest from North America.

Emma Hill, the daughter of Michael Hill, succeeded him as chairperson after the November 2015 annual general meeting.

In April 2018, Michael Hill closed their nine remaining stores in the US.

In April 2023, Michael Hill announced it would acquire Australian jewellery chain Bevilles and its 26 stores for A$45 million.

== Michael Hill watches ==
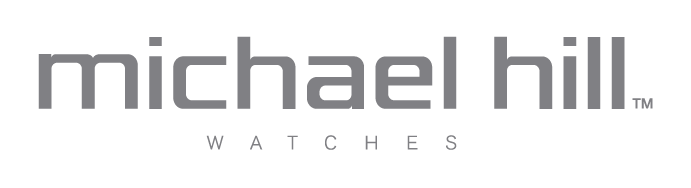
Logo for Michael Hill Watches

In late 2006, following a five-year trial, the company launched its own brand of watches under the Michael Hill name, phasing out all but the Citizen brand of watches by the middle of 2007. By mid-2008, only Michael Hill-brand watches were available in the company's stores.

== Timeline ==
- 1979: Michael Hill opens his first store in Whangarei, New Zealand.
- 1981: Michael Hill began manufacturing his own jewellery in house.
- 2006: The Michael Hill Watch Collection was launched.
- 2009: The Michael Hill Charms Collection was launched.
- 2010: Michael Hill announced the closure of eight stores in the United States.
- The company announced it was in a $40m NZD dispute with the Australian Taxation Office.
- 2013: Michael Hill announced a new global brand, including bridal products and other jewellery which was more feminine.
- 2014: Sales in Australia were described as "lacklustre" due to Australian economic performance. The company settled its dispute with the Australian Taxation Office.
- 2015: The company opened a store in New York City in April 2015. Australian sales improve after poor performance in that market during 2013–2014. Sir Michael Hill moved to a new role of Founder/President, as his daughter Emma became Chairman.

== Gallery ==
Michael Hill and family in front of their first store

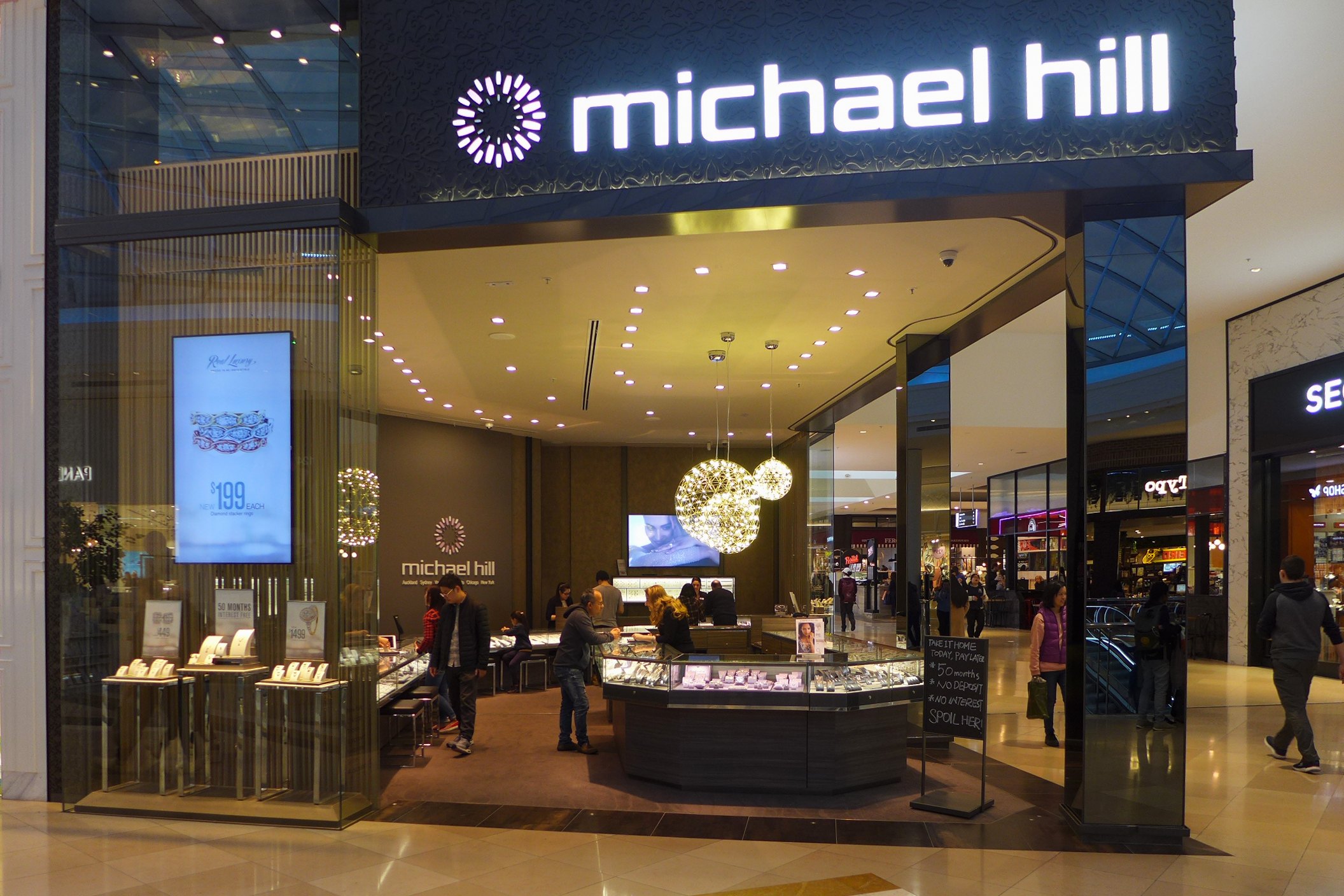
Michael Hill Jeweller at the Chadstone Shopping Centre

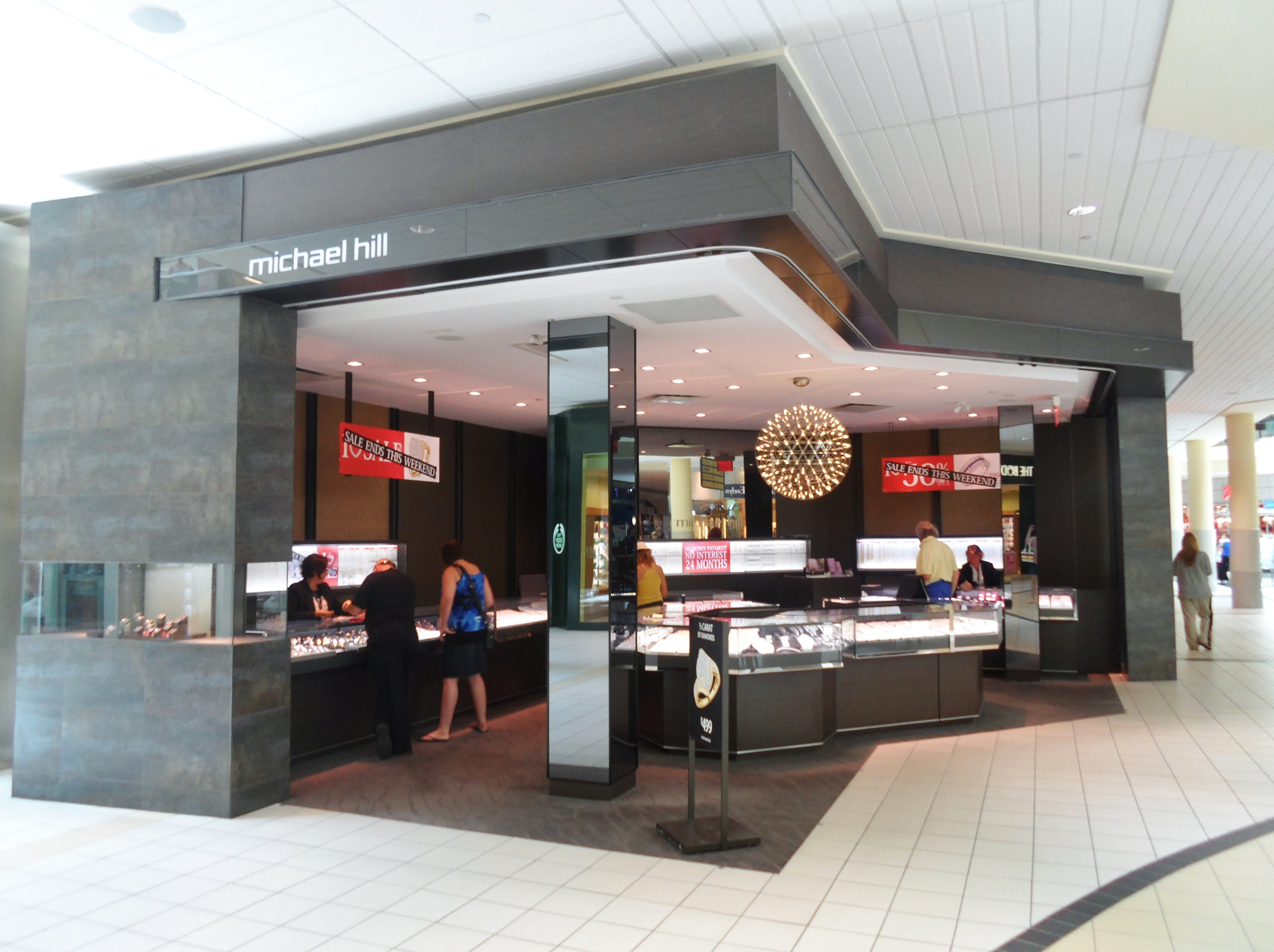
Michael Hill Jeweller at the Upper Canada Mall
