= Nadir Khashimov =

American classical violinist (born 1990)

Nadir Khashimov (born 16 August 1990) is a classical violinist who began his studies at the age of 7. He is a graduate of the Curtis Institute of Music, where he studied with violinists Pamela Frank and Shmuel Ashkenasi. Previous teachers include Vakhob Khashimov, Sergiu Schwartz and Patricio Cobos. He has been awarded scholarships from the Vladimir Spivakov International Foundation and is also the winner of the Woodruff Award for Excellence.

Khashimov has appeared as a soloist with orchestras throughout the world, including the Philadelphia Orchestra, National Orchestra of Russia, Moscow Philharmonic Orchestra, London Symphony Orchestra, Navarra Symphony Orchestra, Czech Republic Orchestra, Monte Carlo Orchestra, National Orchestra of Uzbekistan, United Nations Orchestra and the LaGrange Symphony Orchestra.

Festivals that Nadir has attended include: Bowdoin International Music Festival, Sarasota Music Festival, Heifetz Institute, and the Verbier Academy. While at Verbier in 2012, he was awarded the Violin Prize of the festival.

He has performed in master classes with Zakhar Bron, Vladimir Spivakov, Maxim Vengerov, Ida Kavafian, Anne Akiko Meyers, Joseph Silverstein, Gábor Takács-Nagy, Mauricio Fuks, Boris Kushnir, Daniel Phillips, James Buswell and Ferenz Rados. He has also collaborated with artists Pamela Frank, Roberto Diaz, Colin Carr, Jason Vieaux, Ralph Kirshbaum, Vasily Petrenko, Gintaras Rinkevicius, Vladimir Ziva, Kevin Griffiths, as well as members of the Guarneri, Emerson and Orion Quartets.

Khashimov has been a laureate in numerous competitions, including the Young Musicians Republican Competition, Uzbekistan (1st prize), Dvarionas International Violin Competition, Lithuania (1st prize and Special Prize), Kocian International Violin Competition, Czech Republic (1st prize), Enescu International Violin Competition, Romania (1st prize) and Grand-Prix, Novosibirsk International Violin Competition, Russia (3rd prize and Audience Prize), Blount/Slawson National Competition, USA (2nd prize), Paganini Moscow International Violin Competition, Russia (2nd prize), Pablo Sarasate International Violin Competition, Spain (2nd prize and Audience Prize), Yankelevitch International Violin Competition, Russia (Grand-Prize), and Michael Hill International Violin Competition, New Zealand (4th prize).

Other notable accomplishments include performance of all the Paganini Caprices in one recital and debuts at the Mann Center for the Performing Arts, Carnegie Hall's Stern Auditorium, the Kennedy Center for the Performing Arts and the Grand Hall of the Moscow Conservatory.

Khashimov plays on a Jean-Baptiste Vuillaume violin from 1828.
