= Sarasota Orchestra =

American symphony orchestra

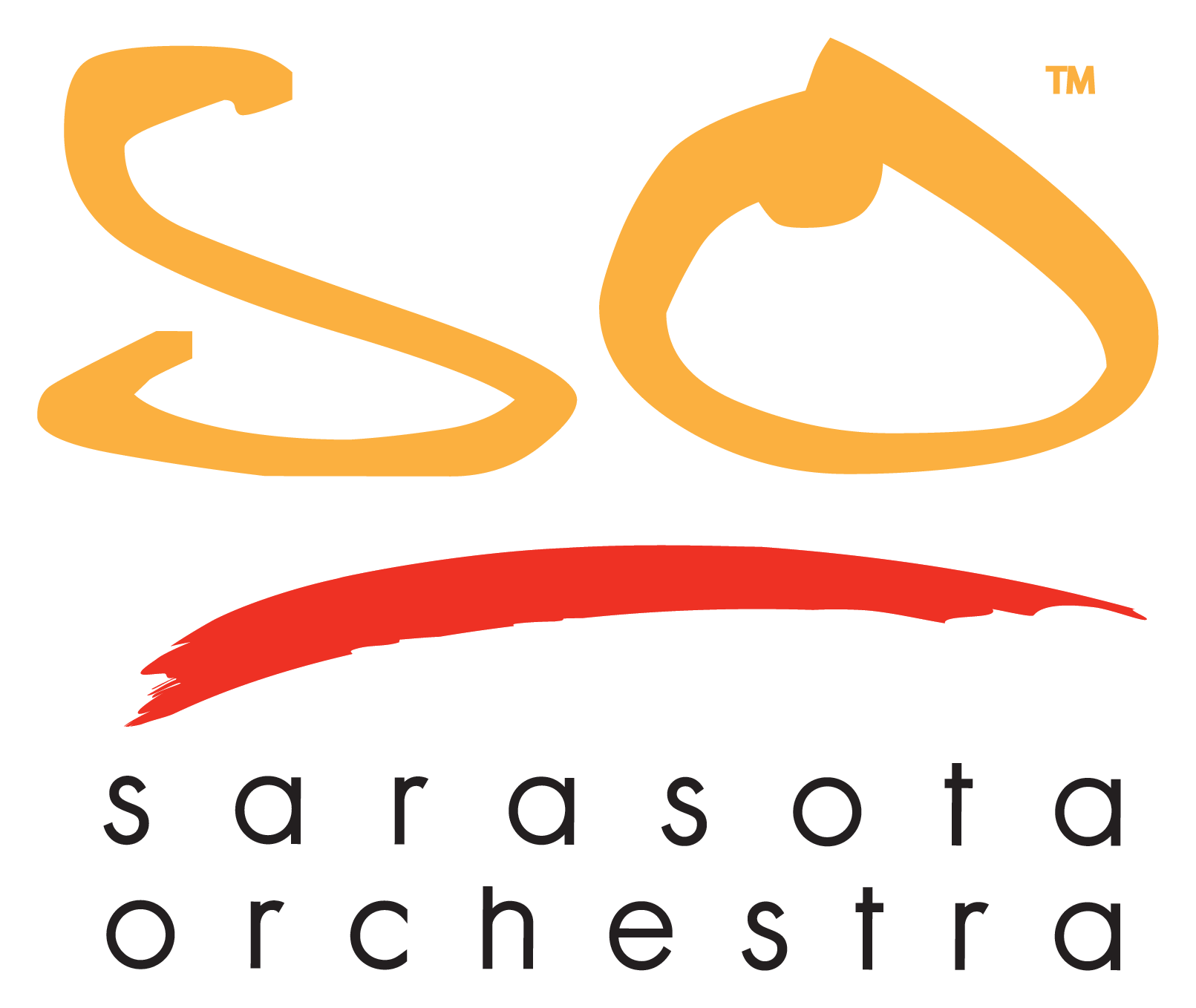
Logo of Sarasota Orchestra

The Sarasota Orchestra is an American symphony orchestra located in Sarasota, Florida. The orchestra is administratively based at the Beatrice Friedman Symphony Center. The orchestra performs concerts in Sarasota at several venues:

- Holley Hall, Beatrice Friedman Symphony Center
- Van Wezel Performing Arts Hall
- Sarasota Opera House
- Neel Performing Arts Center
- North Port High School Auditorium

== History ==
In the fall of 1948, Ruth Cotton Butler, a Sarasota music teacher, enlisted the support of businessmen Dr. W.D. Sugg and J. Lorton Francis of Bradenton, and George Gibbs, an amateur musician from Venice, to form an orchestra. Their combined effort produced the debut concert of the Florida West Coast Symphony on 12 March 1949, conducted by Lyman Wiltse, at the Sarasota Municipal Auditorium. Wiltse worked with the ensemble for one year, as de facto music director. The orchestra's first season contained three concerts, with the first taking place on 19 January 1950. Alexander Bloch was the first full-time music director of the orchestra, from 1950 to 1962. During the first six years of the orchestra, the orchestra did not have a single resident venue. In 1955, the Sarasota city commission approved construction of rehearsal space for the orchestra in the Sarasota civic center. The construction was completed in November 1955.

In 1961, Paul Wolfe began a 35-year tenure as artistic director and conductor. His leadership allowed the orchestra to establish a core chamber and four resident chamber ensembles, expand the Youth Orchestra Program and consolidate the then Florida West Coast Symphony and the Music Festival of Florida, to create the Sarasota Music Festival. In 1985, the orchestra merged with the Sarasota Music Festival.

Leif Bjaland succeeded Wolf as music director in 1997, and served in the post until 2012. His work during his tenure included the instigation of a concert series titled 'Journeys to Genius'. In February 2011, Anu Tali made her first guest-conducting appearance with the orchestra. In June 2013, the orchestra named Tali as its next music director, effective August 1, 2013, with an initial contract of 3 years. She is the first female conductor to be named music director of the orchestra. The orchestra extended her contract for another 3 years in 2016. In October 2017, the orchestra announced the scheduled conclusion of Tali's music directorship of the orchestra in 2019. Following the departure of Tali as music director, Jeffrey Kahane served as artistic director with the orchestra from 2019 to 2021.

In the 2019–2020 season, prior to the COVID-19 pandemic, Bramwell Tovey first guest-conducted the Sarasota Orchestra. In August 2021, the orchestra announced the appointment of Tovey as its next music director, effective with the 2022–2023 season, with an initial tenure of four years. He took the title of music director-designate on 1 September 2021, and served in that capacity until his death on 12 July 2022.

After performing in five different venues, the orchestra plans to centralize its concerts in a single facility. In April 2023, the organization bought a 32-acre site in Sarasota that will be home to a music center that will include an 1,800-seat concert hall and a 700-seat flexible-use performance space.

In January 2024, Giancarlo Guerrero first guest-conducted the orchestra. In August 2024, the Sarasota Orchestra announced the appointment of Guerrero as its next music director, effective with the 2025–2026 season, with an initial contract of five seasons. He held the title of music director-designate for the 2024–2025 season.

== Music directors ==
- Lyman Wiltse (1949–1950)
- Alexander Bloch (1950–1962)
- Paul Wolfe (1961–1995)
- Leif Bjaland (1997–2012)
- Anu Tali (2013–2019)
- Bramwell Tovey (2021–2022 [designate])
- Giancarlo Guerrero (2025–present)
