= Nordic Symphony Orchestra =

Estonian orchestra

- Also known as: NSO
- Origin: Tallinn, Estonia
- Genres: Classical
- Occupation: Symphony orchestra
- Years active: 1997-present
- Members: Principal Conductor; Anu Tali; Manager; Kadri Tali
- Website: www.nordicsymphony.com

The Nordic Symphony Orchestra (NSO) (previously Estonian-Finnish Symphony Orchestra) is an international symphony orchestra. It was founded by Anu and Kadri Tali in 1997.

== Biography ==
The NSO was founded in 1997 by Anu and Kadri Tali as the Estonian-Finnish Symphony Orchestra, to develop cultural contacts between Estonia and Finland. Today the NSO has members from fifteen countries, and presents pieces from the classical repertoire as well as contemporary and less well-known music. The orchestra has staged a number of themed concert seasons, such as The Musical Capitals of the World (1998/1999), Life and Death (1999/2000), Symphony (2000/2001), Musica Grande (2001/2002), Passion or Passion (2002/2003), A la Russe (2003/2004), Face of North (2004/2005), Legends (2005/2006), Apocalypse (2006/2007), "Strata" 2007/2008 and "Meetingpoint Estonia" 2009/ 2010.

== Recordings ==
The NSO has released three recordings, all conducted by Anu Tali:

- Swan Flight : works by Veljo Tormis, Claude Debussy and Jean Sibelius (Finlandia Records/Warner Music 2001), as Estonian-Finnish Symphony Orchestra
- Action - Passion - Illusion : works by Erkki-Sven Tüür, Sibelius and Sergei Rachmaninoff (Warner Music 2005).
- Strata : Tüür’s Symphony No 6 and double concerto “Noesis” (ECM New Series 2010)

Every concert of the NSO is recorded and broadcast by the Estonian Broadcasting Company as well as the European Broadcasting Union (EBU).

== Awards and coverage ==
Documentaries have been made about NSO by several television channels, including NHK (2005) in Japan, Arte (2007; 2008) and ARD (2005) in Germany, Deutsche Welle (2007), Finnish Yle TV and Estonian TV (2003, 2005).

In October 2003 the first NSO record, Swan Flight, won a prize at the Echo Classics Awards in Germany. In 2005 the second CD Action. Passion. Illusion was nominated for the same prize and was widely covered in the international music press. In 2006 conductor Anu Tali won the Young Musician of the Year prize from the President of Estonia and was voted Musician of the Year 2006 by the Estonian Broadcasting Union. In 2008 Tali was awarded the UNICEF Bluebird Award in Estonia and Rising Start Award in Estonia and Germany.
