= Anu Tali =

Estonian conductor

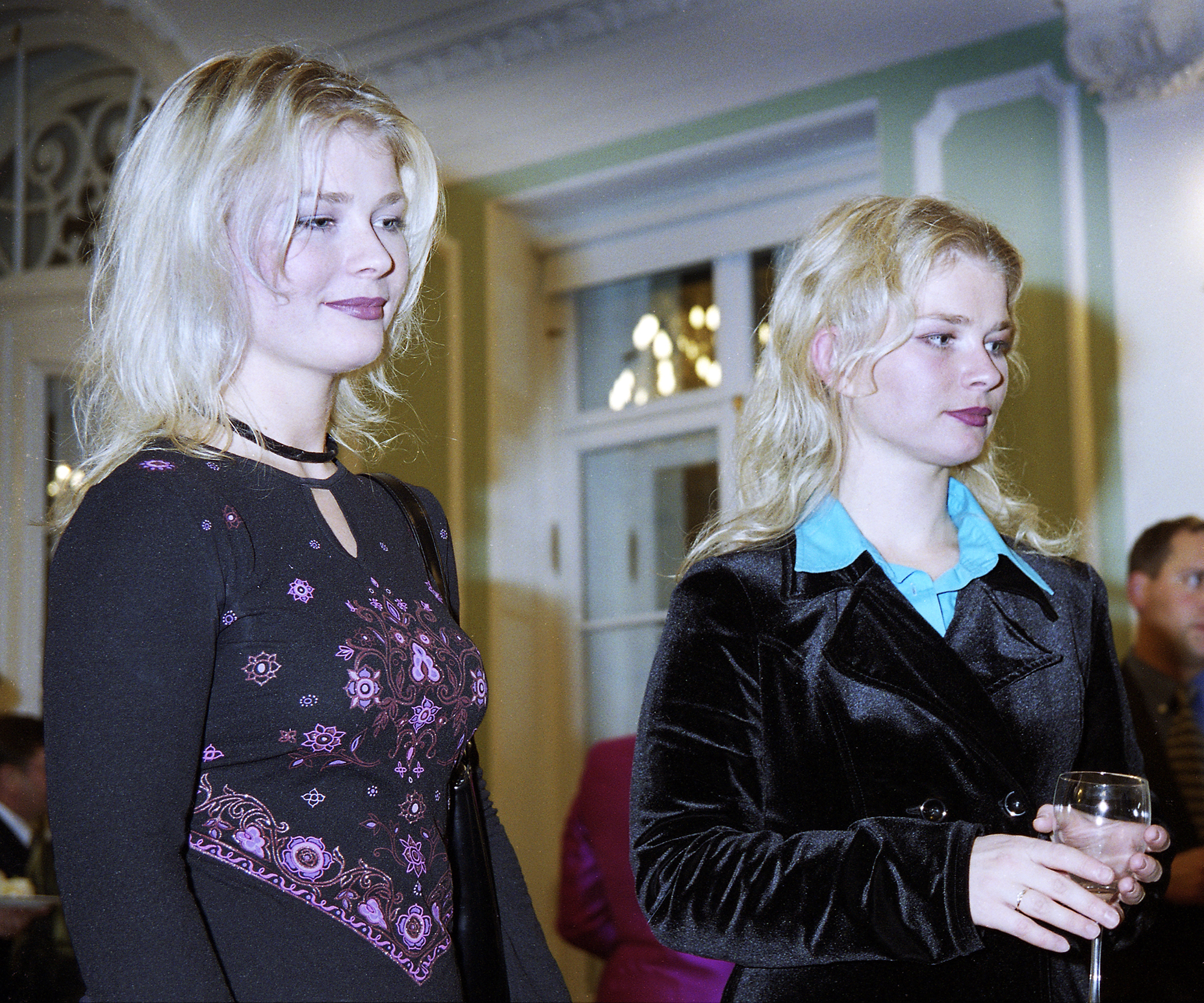
Anu Tali (right) with twin sister Kadri Tali (left), 2000

Anu Tali (born June 18, 1972) is an Estonian conductor and one of the founders of the Nordic Symphony Orchestra.

== Life and career ==
Tali was born in Tallinn. Her mother Anne Tali is a prominent mathematician. Her twin sister Kadri Tali is a music manager and the former director of the Estonian National Symphony Orchestra. She started her musical training as a pianist, and graduated from the Tallinn Music High School in 1991. She continued her studies in the Estonian Music Academy as a conductor with Kuno Areng, Toomas Kapten and Roman Matsov. From 1998 to 2000, she studied at the St. Petersburg State Conservatory with Ilya Musin and later with Leonid Korchmar. She began conducting studies in 1995 with Jorma Panula at the Sibelius Academy in Helsinki. In 1997, Tali and her twin sister Kadri Tali founded the Estonian-Finnish Symphony Orchestra, with Anu Tali as the orchestra's conductor and Kadri Tali as its manager. The orchestra later took on the name of the Nordic Symphony Orchestra. Tali and the Nordic Symphony Orchestra made their debut recording in 2002 with "Swan Flight", for Finlandia/Warner Classics, which featured two world premiere recordings, the orchestral suites Ocean and Swan Flight by Veljo Tormis. This recording earned her the Young Artist of the Year award at the 2003 Echo Klassic Awards in Germany. Their second recording was Action Passion Illusion, also on Warner Classics.

In North America, Tali made her US conducting debut with the New Jersey Symphony Orchestra in January 2005. In April 2007, Tali was named music director of the Manitoba Chamber Orchestra, and scheduled to begin in the post September 2007. However, in November 2008, the orchestra announced that it and Tali were unable to agree on contract terms, and Tali never assumed the Manitoba post.

In the summer of 2006, Tali debuted at the Savonlinna Opera Festival with a new production of Carmen and also at the Salzburg Festival with the Mozarteum Orchestra. Her work in contemporary music includes conducting the US premiere of Heiner Goebbels' Songs of Wars I Have Seen.

Tali made her first guest-conducting appearance with the Sarasota Orchestra in February 2011. In June 2013, the Sarasota Orchestra named Tali as its next music director, effective August 1, 2013, with an initial contract of 3 years. The orchestra extended her contract for another 3 years in 2016. In October 2017, the orchestra announced that Tali is to stand down from her music directorship of the orchestra in 2019.

Tali and her husband Hendrik Agur, director of the Gustav Adolf Grammar School in Tallinn, were married in 2014. The couple have a child, born in May 2015. Her awards and honours include the Cultural Award of Estonia 2003 and the Presidential Award of Estonia in 2004. Tali has also recorded Estonian music with the Frankfurt RSO. In 2021, Anu Tali conducted the world premiere of Karola Obermüller's cello concerto Phosphor.

Cultural offices
Preceded by no predecessor	Music Director, Nordic Symphony Orchestra; 1997–present	Succeeded by incumbent
Preceded by Leif Bjaland	Music Director, Sarasota Orchestra; 2013–2019	Succeeded by (post vacant)
