= Musethica =

Non-governmental organization dealing with music education

Musethica is a Spanish non-governmental organization that teaches classical music to music student. It was founded in 2012 in Zaragoza, Spain by Avri Levitan and Carmen Marcuello. A key part of the program is a large number of student concerts in the community.

Musethica has affiliates in China, Israel, and other European nations.

== Model ==
The central objective of Musethica is to educate music students by giving them the opportunities to perform publicly on a frequent basis to a variety of audiences. The students participate in master classes conducted by professional musicians, who often perform with the students.

The model provides the students with the opportunity to play a large number of yearly concerts, which improves their musical and instrumental abilities.r. it is considered a new element in music education,

== History ==
The Musethica concept was conceived in 2009 by Avri Levitan. It was launched in 2012 in Zaragoza under the auspices of Levitan and Professor Carmen Marcuello. The concerts comprise the a repertoire of chamber music from solo performances to octet.

As of 2017, Musethica had five active associations: in Spain, Germany, Israel, Poland and Sweden. Musethica is also active in France, China and Austria.
