= Mintzer =

Mintzer is a surname. Notable people with the surname include:

- Bob Mintzer (born 1953), American jazz saxophonist and composer
- Claire Fagin (1926–2024), née Mintzer, American nurse and educator
- Ross Mintzer (born 1987), American singer‑songwriter

== See also ==
- Mintzer House
