= Michael Thurber =

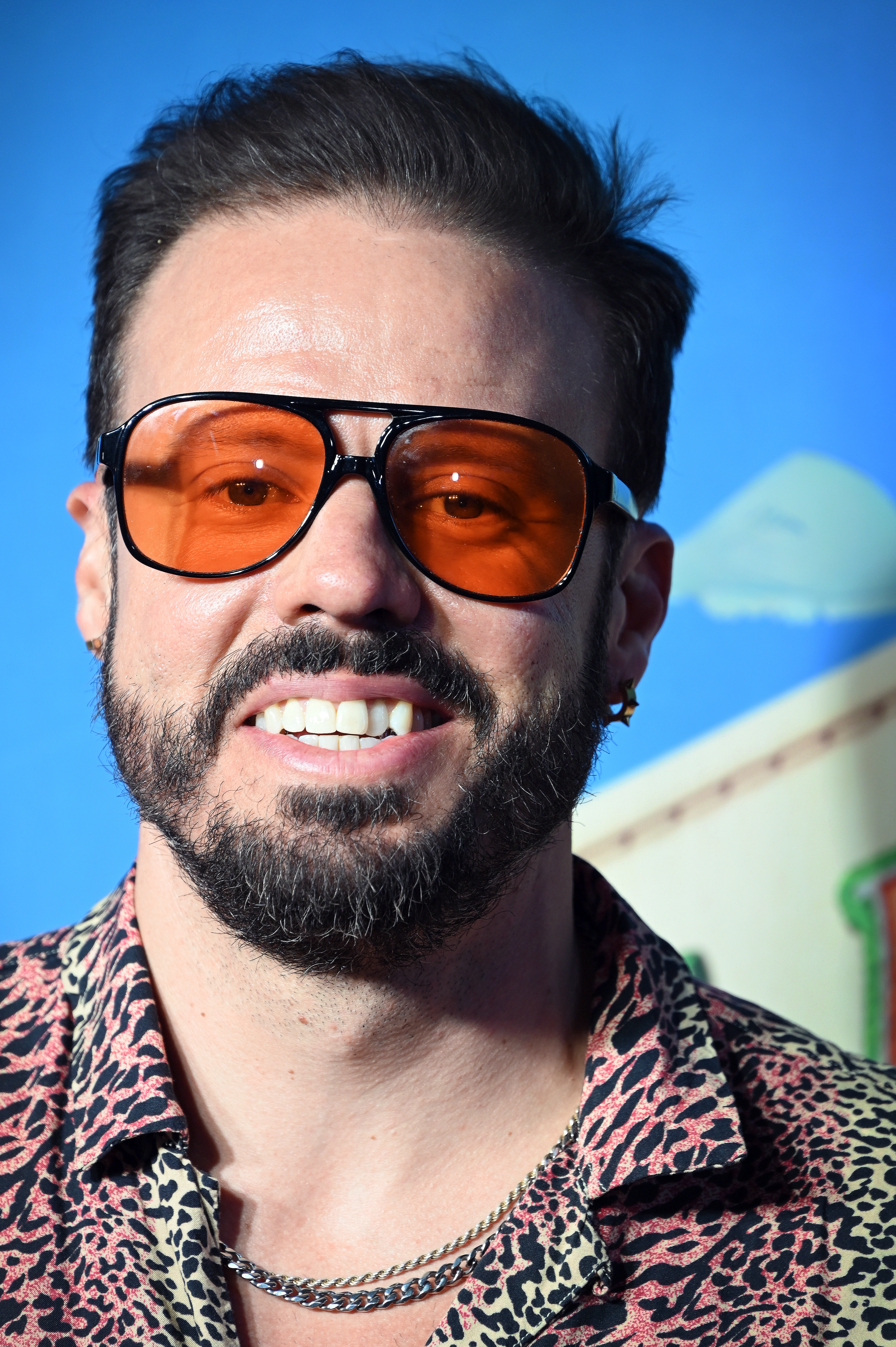
- Thurber in 2026

Background information
- Born: Tulsa, Oklahoma
- Occupations: Composer; songwriter; bassist
- Instruments: Double bass; bass guitar

Michael Thurber is an American composer, songwriter, bassist and actor. He is a co-founder of CDZA, a YouTube music collective that performed at the YouTube Music Awards in 2013. Thurber has composed scores for theater productions such as Antony and Cleopatra at The Public Theater and Sugar In Our Wounds at the Manhattan Theater Club. From 2015 to 2016 he was the bassist for Stay Human, the house band on The Late Show With Stephen Colbert. He is on the Board of Directors of National Public Radio's From the Top and teaches at New York University's Clive Davis Institute.

== Early life ==
Michael Thurber was born in Tulsa, Oklahoma and grew up in Portage, Indiana. He graduated high school from the Interlochen Arts Academy in 2005.

== Career ==
In 2005, Thurber was accepted into The Juilliard School in New York City. He was the first undergraduate to be accepted into both the Classical and Jazz divisions. He was a member of Remington, a rock band he founded in 2005 with Ross Mintzer. In 2007, he performed on NPR's From the Top with banjo player Bela Fleck.

=== Stay Human and bassist ===
From 2015 to 2016, he was the bassist on CBS's The Late Show with Stephen Colbert as a member of the house band, Jon Batiste and Stay Human. While in the band, he recorded The Late Show EP. Thurber performs internationally in a duo with violinist Tessa Lark.

=== CDZA and YouTube ===
In 2012, Thurber co-founded CDZA with Joe Sabia and Matt McCorkle. CDZA was a YouTube-based music collective that featured over 100 young, conservatory trained performers. As of 2019, the CDZA YouTube channel has over 304,000 subscribers and over 36 million views. In 2012, they created AT&T's "Thank You Notes", a digital ad campaign in collaboration with BBDO. They performed at the first ever YouTube Music Awards, headlining alongside Lady Gaga, Arcade Fire, Eminem and M.I.A. Thurber later worked with YouTube's event teams as music director.

=== Theater ===
Thurber wrote the score for Antony and Cleopatra, a co-production between The Royal Shakespeare Company in Stratford, UK and The Public Theater. In 2013, Thurber's musical Goddess was accepted into The Eugene O'Neill Musical Theater Conference. From 2012 to 2017, Thurber wrote the music for several of The Public Theater's Mobile Shakespeare productions including Pericles, Macbeth, and Twelfth Night. Thurber also acted in Twelfth Night, performing the role of Antonio.

In 2016, Thurber wrote and performed his one man musical The Booty Call, which was produced for a month long run at The Barrow Group Theater.

In 2018, Thurber composed scores for the plays Sugar In Our Wounds at MTC and Eddie and Dave at The Atlantic Theater Company. In 2018, he received a Working Farm residency at SPACE on Ryder Farm.

In 2025, Thurber received his first Tony Award nomination for Best Orchestrations for his work on Just in Time.

=== Concert music and other compositions ===
In 2015, Thurber wrote Three Musketeers: A Play for Instruments. The piece is a quadruple concerto written for and featuring pianist Kris Bowers, clarinetist Mark Dover and violinist Charles Yang. It was premiered on a live radio broadcast with The Interlochen Academy Orchestra. That same year, Thurber also joined the board of NPR's From The Top and composed music for the dance piece "B Sides" choreographed by Tiffany Rea Fisher for Dallas Black Dance.

In 2016, he composed "Jam Session", a horn piece for virtuoso hornist William VerMeulen, commissioned by the International Horn Society and a violin concerto "Love Letter" for violinist Tessa Lark. Thurber has written commercial scores for Vanity Fair, BBC America and CollegeHumor.
