= Joe Sabia =

American filmmaker and digital content producer (born 1983)

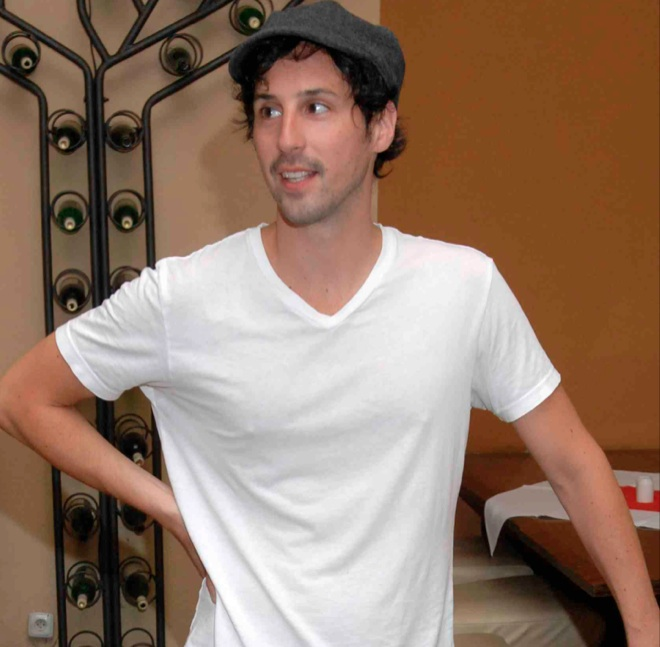
- Sabia in 2014
- Born: September 16, 1983 (age 42)
- Education: Boston College
- Occupations: Filmmaker; digital video artist
- Years active: 2005–present
- Known for: "73 Questions", Federer: Twelve Final Days
- Awards: Best Cinematography Streamy Award; Best Pop Culture Video Series Streamy Award
- Website: joesabia.co

Joe Sabia (born September 16, 1983) is an American filmmaker and digital content producer. He is best known as the creator and voice of "73 Questions", a rapid-fire one-take digital series featuring celebrities that he developed for Vogue in 2014. Sabia was named the Senior Vice President of Creative Development at Condé Nast Entertainment after the release of the first video with Sarah Jessica Parker. In 2024, he directed his first feature film Federer: Twelve Final Days for Amazon Studios on the retirement of Roger Federer from tennis.

== Biography ==
During his childhood, Sabia competed in spelling bees and memorized the capitals of every country in the world. He also taught himself to read and write Russian and later learned Italian. In 2005, as a member of the comedy group, Asinine, Sabia began teaching himself to film and edit from his father's camera, while attending Boston College. He switched between the Morrissey College of Arts & Sciences and the Carroll School of Management at the university, debating whether to attend law school to become a politician before graduating with a Bachelor of Arts in 2006.

In 2007, Sabia won the International Pun Championship in Austin, Texas off a rhyming monologue about the 43 presidents that he wrote in under an hour. Sabia moved to New York City from Connecticut in 2011 and gave a TED Talk on “The Technology of Storytelling" that same year. Sabia played piano three hours a day through his high school years and is an amateur classical pianist attempting such compositions as Sergei Rachmaninoff's Piano Concerto No. 3.

== Selected projects ==
In 2005, Sabia screened a spoof of The OC known as The BC, which he had created with members of his comedy group on an independent website using QuickTime. The show was about college kids at Boston College and a Jesuit priest, who takes in a troubled student from Boston University. It later featured cameos from Tim Russert, Doug Flutie and Jared Dudley, among others. Sabia spent more than six hours each day working on the show.

HBOlab, an experimental incubator of HBO, offered him a job out of college, where he was known as "whippersnapper who speaks to the Web the way Dolittle does to animals." During that time, Sabia edited footage from the first six seasons of The Sopranos into a seven-minute series recap before the seventh season premiere called "Seven Minute Sopranos", which was uploaded without permission from HBO's lawyers. Series creator, David Chase was shown the video on the set of the series finale. Sabia's role in the video's creation was not public until The New York Times revealed it in a follow-up story.

Jon Batiste introduced Sabia to Michael Thurber and Matt McCorkle in 2011. The three artists founded the YouTube music collective CDZA for conservatory-trained musicians to create experimental music videos. Sabia directed the videos on the YouTube channel.

The non-profit organization, Mama Hope partnered with Sabia to create the "Stop the Pity, Unlock the Potential" video campaign, which worked to change the perception of Africans and Africa. Sabia's videos included "Alex Teaches Commando", which featured an African boy recapping the 1985 Arnold Schwarzenegger film, Commando, and "African Men, Hollywood Stereotypes".

In 2014, Sabia and Aaron Rasmussen released a 'Time Machine' of "every cultural real-life reference from every episode of The Office" which took over one and one half years to compile and create. After directing Booms, a short film on musical interpretation of the 1950s for Vanity Fair's "The Decade Series", Sabia received a call from Condé Nast Entertainment while heading to the Dominican Republic asking for a video pitch for Sarah Jessica Parker. He developed a concept during a whale-watching trip as a comedic, rapid-fire questionnaire, which became "73 Questions". In 2018, he received the "Best Cinematography" and "Best Pop Culture Video Series" Streamy Awards for his work in "73 Questions".

Sabia interviewed Billie Eilish, an unknown artist in October 2017, and held onto the footage for "73 Questions" intending to give the same interview one year later for a side-by-side time capsule video. Eilish ballooned in success by October 2018 and the video was viewed more than 11 million times within a few weeks of release and 131 million overall. He has also developed "Celebrity ASMR" for W Magazine and "Virtually Dating" for Facebook Watch.

In 2024, Sabia directed his first feature film Federer: Twelve Final Days for Amazon Studios on the retirement of Roger Federer from tennis, alongside director Asif Kapadia. Initially pitched as footage intended for only Federer and his family and friends, he put together a 63 minute edit which persuaded Federer to release it as a film to the world.
