= World Goes Round =

Single by Ross Mintzer
- Released: April 2013
- Recorded: 2013
- Genre: World music, folk rock
- Length: 5:14
- Label: RPM LLC
- Songwriter(s): Ross Mintzer

Ross Mintzer singles chronology
"Victory" (2013)	"World Goes Round" (2013)	"Lost In America" (2013)

"World Goes Round" is a song by American musician Ross Mintzer, released as a single 2013. "World Goes Round" was recorded by the Ross Mintzer Band.

== Personnel ==
- Ross Mintzer - vocals, acoustic guitar
- Kevin Ryan - Harmonica
- Crystal Powell - Vocals
