= Lost in America (disambiguation) =

Lost in America is a 1985 satirical road comedy film directed by Albert Brooks.

Lost in America may also refer to:

== Music ==
- Lost in America (RTZ album), a 2005 reissue of RTZ's album Lost
- Lost in America (Pavlov's Dog album), 1990
- Lost in America (Edwin McCain album), 2006, or the title song
- Lost in America, a 1996 album by The Gathering Field, or the title song of the album
- "Lost in America" (Alice Cooper song), 1994
- "Lost in America" (Ross Mintzer song), 2013

== Film and television ==
- "Lost in America" (ER), 2006 episode of ER
- Lost in America (2018 film), documentary feature film by director Rotimi Rainwater
