= World Go Round (disambiguation) =

"World Go Round" is a song by American rapper Busta Rhymes from the album Back on My B.S.

World Go Round may also refer to:

- "World Go 'Round", a song by Rogue Traders from the album Here Come the Drums
- "World Go 'Round", a song by No Doubt from the album Tragic Kingdom

== See also ==
- World Goes Round
