= Fantasiestücke, Op. 73 =

Pieces by Robert Schumann

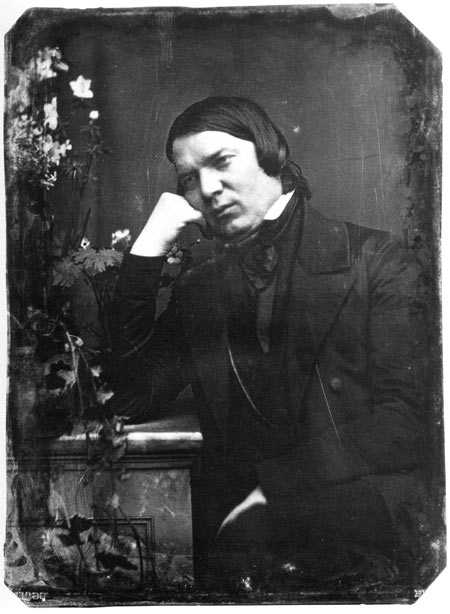
Robert Schumann in an 1850 daguerreotype

The Fantasiestücke for clarinet and piano, Op. 73, were written in 1849 by Robert Schumann. Though they were originally intended for clarinet and piano, Schumann indicated that the clarinet part could be also performed on violin or cello.

== History ==
Robert Schumann wrote the pieces over just two days in February 1849, and originally entitled them "Soirée Pieces" before settling on the title Fantasiestücke ("fantasy pieces"). The title is one Schumann was fond of, since he used it in several works. This poetic title promotes the fundamental Romantic notion that creative expression is the product of the artist's unrestricted imagination. In addition, the connotations of "fantasy" justify the sudden mood changes.

== Description ==
A 2008 performance of Fantasiestücke by Narek Hakhnazaryan (cello) and Roman Rabinovich (piano)

The three individual pieces are:

1. Zart und mit Ausdruck (Tender and with expression)
2. Lebhaft, leicht (Lively, light)
3. Rasch und mit Feuer (Quick and with fire)

The first piece is in A minor and begins dreamily with hints of melancholy, but concludes with a resolution and hope in A major, looking forward to the next movement.

The second piece is in A major and is playful, upbeat, energetic and positive, with a central section modulating to F major with chromatic triplets in dialogue with the piano.

The final piece is again in A major. The pace suddenly drives into a frenzy of passion and fiery energy, bordering on the irrational, and at times quoting motifs from both of the previous two pieces. The movement pushes the players to their limits as Schumann labels each of the last two sections (of three) of the coda "schneller" (faster). The movement ends exuberantly with a triumphant close.

== See also ==
- Fantasiestücke, Op. 12
- Three Fantasiestücke, Op. 111
