= Federer: Twelve Final Days =

2024 film by Asif Kapadia and Joe Sabia

- Amazon Prime Video poster
- Directed by: Asif Kapadia; Joe Sabia
- Produced by: George Chignell; Asif Kapadia
- Starring: Roger Federer
- Cinematography: Jess Dunlap; Joe Sabia
- Edited by: Avdhesh Mohla
- Music by: Dario Marianelli
- Production company: Lafcadia Productions
- Distributed by: Amazon Prime Video
- Release dates: 10 June 2024 (Tribeca); 20 June 2024 (Worldwide)
- Running time: 88 minutes
- Country: United Kingdom
- Language: English

Federer: Twelve Final Days is a 2024 British documentary film directed by Asif Kapadia and Joe Sabia. It follows Roger Federer in the last 12 days of his professional career, which ended at the 2022 Laver Cup. It premiered at the Tribeca Festival on 10 June 2024 and was released on Amazon Prime Video on 20 June 2024.

== Synopsis ==
On 14 September 2022, after a 24-year tennis career, Roger Federer films his retirement announcement video. The next day, the announcement is released to the public.

Federer arrives in London for his final tournament, the Laver Cup, where he will be playing for Team Europe alongside Novak Djokovic, Andy Murray, and Rafael Nadal, under captain Björn Borg. On 23 September, he plays his final match, a doubles match partnering Nadal, his greatest rival, against Frances Tiafoe and Jack Sock. Serving at match point in the deciding tiebreak, Federer commits an unforced error, equalizing the score. Tiafoe and Sock eventually win the tiebreak, and Federer's career is officially completed.

Through tears, Federer hugs his teammates amid uproarious applause by the crowd. Nadal is overcome by emotion, knowing that he will never be able to play against his greatest rival again. Federer gives an emotional farewell speech thanking his wife, Mirka, and his entire family. In a final interview, he states that he is happy knowing the profound impact he made on tennis.

== Cast ==
- Roger Federer
- Mirka Federer
- Leo Federer
- Myla Federer
- Lenny Federer
- Charlene Federer
- Tony Godsick
- Anna Wintour
- Mary Joe Fernández
- Lynette Federer
- Robert Federer
- Novak Djokovic
- Andy Murray
- Björn Borg
- Rod Laver
- John McEnroe
- Rafael Nadal
- Severin Lüthi
- Pierre Paganini

=== Featured Laver Cup players ===
- Matteo Berrettini
- Stefanos Tsitsipas
- Casper Ruud
- Cameron Norrie
- Frances Tiafoe
- Jack Sock
- Félix Auger-Aliassime
- Taylor Fritz

== Production ==
Director Joe Sabia had met Roger Federer in 2019 when he directed Federer's "73 Questions" video for Vogue. Three years later, Federer's team approached Sabia to film his retirement announcement, which was released on 15 September 2022. In addition to the retirement announcement, Sabia documented the final 12 days of Federer's career.

The documentary footage was never intended for public viewing, with Federer stating, "I was convinced early on that I should have some footage of the inner circle just for my life, just for the kids [to see] when they grow up, that they remember [...] how it was, especially that very particular moment of my life." However, he later decided to release the film to the public. Director Asif Kapadia was brought onto the project to turn Sabia's documentary into a full feature film, which included adding 30 minutes of archive footage and interviews with former players.

== Release ==
The film was greenlit by Amazon Prime Video in February 2024. A teaser trailer was released on 14 May 2024, and the official trailer was released on 3 June 2024.

The film premiered at the Tribeca Festival and was released on Amazon Prime Video on 20 June 2024. To promote the film ahead of its streaming release, clips of Federer were projected onto the Tower Bridge in London.

== Reception ==
Matt Majendie of the Evening Standard rated the film three out of five stars, calling it "moving, but a bit too controlled." He further wrote, "[I]t left me feeling like there could have been more as seen so recently in that graduation speech. It also feels exactly like what it is – a home video originally created for the family and then subsequently turned into a documentary, one suspects because his tennis farewell playing on court with big rival and friend Rafael Nadal was so perfect." Anita Singh of The Telegraph also gave the film three out of five stars, writing, "Nice guys like Roger Federer don’t make for thrilling subjects, but for sports fans, Asif Kapadia's film is still a worthwhile watch."

Peter Bradshaw of The Guardian gave the film two out of five stars, writing, "[The film] doesn’t give us much of his actual playing, except in tiny clips; it’s only about this peculiar twilit time between the announcement and the final tearful retirement moment. It’s a period in which all the big decisions – including of course the decision to greenlight this film – are not shown." Raphael Abraham of Financial Times also gave the film two out of five stars, calling it a "lachrymose lap of honour" that "lacks game." He further wrote, "Twelve Final Days is big on PR but low on actual tennis. Talking heads hymn the beauty of Federer's silky, seemingly effortless technique but analysis of what made it so is fleeting."

Liz Moody of Empire gave the film three out of five stars, calling it "an entertaining, occasionally illuminating and at times surprisingly moving look at the final bow of a genuine tennis legend." Johnny Oleksinski of the New York Post gave the film three out of four stars, writing, "[T]he poignant takeaway from Federer's documentary is: Enjoy it while it lasts." Wendy Ide of The Observer rated the film three out of five stars, stating, "[T]he film is not particularly revolutionary or groundbreaking in its approach. But...like its subject, it is a work of unmistakable quality and class."

Daniel Fienberg of The Hollywood Reporter called the film "heartfelt if dull" and "as controlled as Federer could have hoped for." Andrew Barker of Variety wrote, "For fans, this handsomely-mounted film's level of access will be enticement enough, and its emotional peaks are undeniably stirring. But its limited scope and curious demureness prevent it from offering the full-scale portrait that a figure like Federer deserves." Camilla Long of The Times wrote, "Twelve Days, like many Federer things, takes what must be the extraordinary experience of being Roger Federer and turns it simply into a flattened, smooth, uninteresting bit of nylon promo...with none of the teddyish spontaneity of, say, his commencement address at Dartmouth College."
