= Narek Hakhnazaryan =

Armenian cellist

- Born: October 23, 1988 (age 37); Yerevan

Narek Hakhnazaryan in 2008 (performing Schumann's Fantasy Pieces op. 73 together with pianist Roman Rabinovich)

Narek Hakhnazaryan (Armenian: Նարեկ Հախնազարյան) (born October 23, 1988) is an Armenian cellist who won the gold medal for cello at the 2011 International Tchaikovsky Competition.

== Biography ==
Hakhnazaryan was born and raised by his musician parents in Yerevan, Armenia, where he began studying cello at the age of six at the Sayat Nova Music School. When he turned 11, he and his mother moved to Moscow. He was admitted to the Moscow Conservatory in 2006, where he took cello lessons from Alexey Seleznyov and later received scholarships from the Rostropovich Foundation and the Russian Performing Arts Fund. He received the first prize at the 2006 Aram Khachaturian International Competition in Armenia. In 2008, he won both the first prize at the Johansen International Competition for Young String Players and the first prize at the International Auditions of the Young Concert Artists, after which he made his debut at New York's Carnegie Hall and at the Kennedy Center, Washington, DC.

In 2011, he won a gold medal in the Tchaikovsky International Competition.

He was mentored by Mstislav Rostropovich and obtained an Artist Diploma after studying with Lawrence Lesser at the New England Conservatory. He was named a BBC New Generation Artist in 2014, and his performances are regularly broadcast on BBC Radio 3.

== Career ==
Hakhnazaryan has performed with the London Symphony Orchestra, as well as both the Rotterdam Philharmonic and Mariinsky Orchestra under Valery Gergiev. He also performed with orchestras including Chicago Symphony Orchestra under Ton Koopman, where he stood in for Yo-Yo Ma, and with St. Luke's Orchestra, the Dallas Symphony, the Los Angeles Philharmonic, La Scala, NHK Symphony Orchestra, the Seattle Symphony, the Seoul Philharmonic, the New Zealand Symphony Orchestra and the Orquesta Clásica Santa Cecilia.

As a chamber musician, he has performed at the Concertgebouw in Amsterdam, Paris's Salle Pleyel, London's Wigmore Hall, the Konzerthaus Berlin, the Vienna Konzerthaus, Tokyo's Oji Hall, Carnegie Hall, and many other venues. He has also played at music festivals in London, Mecklenburg-Vorpommern, Tivoli, Mikkeli, Lucerne, and Verbier.
