= Aimless Mystics =

aimless mystics

Studio album by Ross Mintzer
- Released: October 31, 2025
- Recorded: 2023
- Genres: pop, electronic dance
- Length: 23:41
- Producer: Ross Mintzer

aimless mystics is an album by American musician Ross Mintzer. It incorporates elements of pop and electronic dance music and features Mintzer's live saxophone performance. The album was self-produced and consists of eight tracks.

== Background and production ==
Mintzer began developing material for aimless mystics in 2023. The album was developed over a period of approximately two years. Its title and conceptual framework draw on Buddhist philosophy, particularly the idea of "aimlessness".

The album was produced by Mintzer. Most of the vocals were recorded using a vintage Neumann U47 microphone.

Two tracks were co-produced by Italian producer Lorenzo Cosi and the album was mastered by Alex DeTurk.

== Style and performances ==
aimless mystics combines electronic production, saxophone, and other global musical elements. Its themes have been linked to Buddhist philosophy and Stoicism.

The album is associated with Mintzer's live performances in Eau Claire, Wisconsin, including appearances at the Pablo Center at the Confluence and The 410. Some performances also incorporated live visual art by Max Koehler.

== Track listing ==
All tracks are written by Ross Mintzer.

aimless mystics Track Listing
No.	Title	Length
1.	"Cosmic Farewell"	2:32
2.	"Frequencies"	3:06
3.	"Warriors"	2:52
4.	"Szns"	3:12
5.	"Places"	3:10
6.	"Never Forget"	2:55
7.	"Where New Dreams Begin"	2:48
8.	"Awaken Dreams"	3:06
Total length:		23:41
