= Matt McCorkle =

American sound artist

Matt McCorkle is an American artist, sound designer and audio engineer based out of New York City.

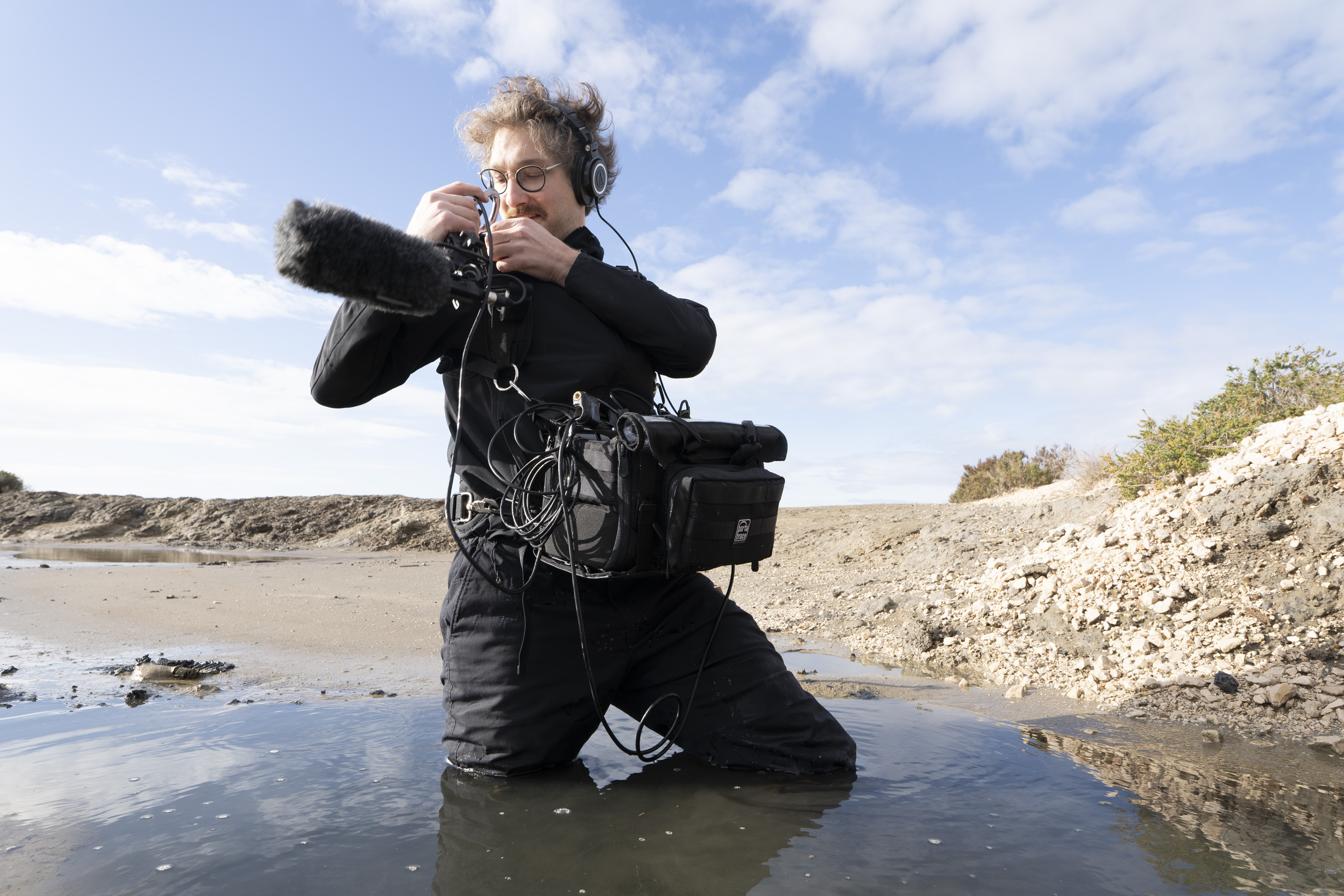
McCorkle's microphone suit used in recording natural elements for his soundscapes.

McCorkle works between a variety of mediums with sound usually being a signature component. Creations like Antipsychotic, co-founding YouTube music collective CDZA, and collaborating with artists such as Jakob Kudsk Steensen.

== Music production ==
McCorkle has worked with numerous mainstream artists including John Legend, A.R. Rahman, Fabolous, Angel Taylor and Laura Izibor. He created a mobile recording studio to work with artists such as Sublime with Rome, LMFAO, We The Kings, Less Than Jake, New Found Glory, Jonathan Batiste and Tinie Tempah.

== Sound art and installations ==
McCorkle blends augmented audio, audio scripting, ambisonics and field recordings to create a unique soundscape style derived from natural elements. His work has been shown internationally. McCorkle is known for his use of web audio scripting to create interactive audio applications that feature his creations.

== Benefit recordings ==
McCorkle has engaged in benefit recordings to celebrate prestigious organizations and their efforts to support the musical community. Such an event took place in the summer of 2011 to honor From The Top and their new Center for the Development of Arts Leaders (CDAL) Boston with the track "And The Sound is Music." Another benefit recording was in early 2011 to celebrate Wingspan Arts and their extraordinary outreach program with the track "Blackbird (Fly Into The Light)."

In 2013, McCorkle put on a big band gala in the ballroom of The Hallmark (Battery Park City's senior residence). The goal of the evening was to recreate the zeitgeist of the early 1930s big band era for the center's residents while raising money for Alzheimer's research. The night was recorded and released as a digital download on Bandcamp. All ticket and record sales were benefited the Alzheimer's Foundation of America.
