= Time for Three =

American musical trio

Time For Three
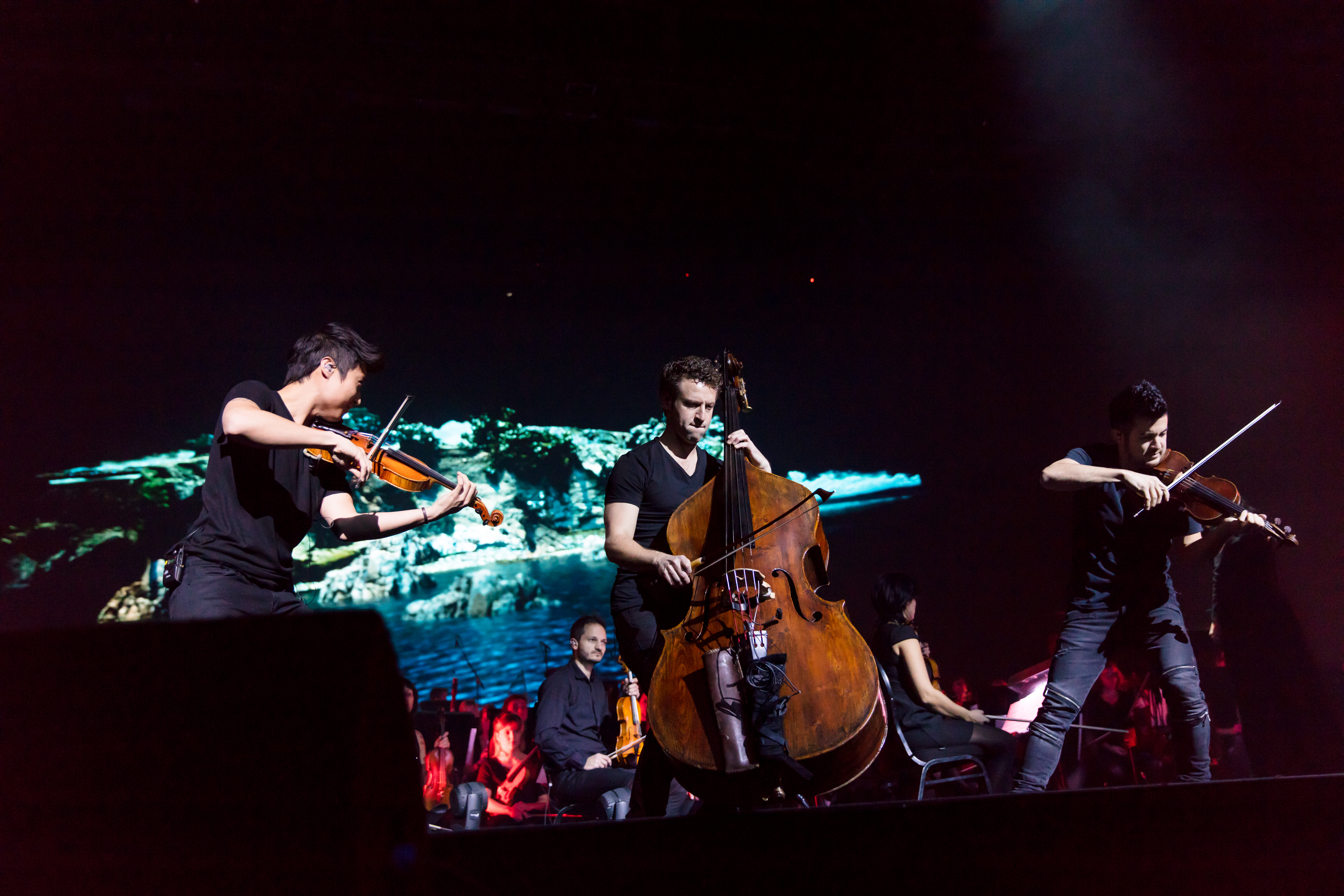
- Time for Three at Night of the Proms (2016) from left to right; Charles Yang, Ranaan Meyer. and Nick Kendall

Background information
- Origin: Philadelphia, Pennsylvania
- Genres: Classical, Americana, Bluegrass, Rock, Live Mashups
- Occupation: String trio
- Years active: 2003–present
- Labels: e1 Music, Deutsche Grammophon/Universal Classics
- Members: Nick Kendall; Ranaan Meyer; Charles Yang
- Past members: Zachary DePue; Nikki Chooi
- Website: tf3.com

Time for Three (Tf3) is a classically trained string trio that explores a variety of musical genres. The members of the group are Nicolas (Nick) Kendall (violin), Charles Yang (violin, guitar), and Ranaan Meyer (double bass). Because of their eclectic musical tastes, ranging from classical to bluegrass to rock to jazz to hip-hop, and their usual casual dress, even while performing at Carnegie Hall, the group refers to itself as a "classically trained garage band". The trio won the 2023 Grammy Award for Best Classical Instrumental Solo.

== Members ==
The original members of the group were Nick Kendall and Zachary DePue (violins), and Ranaan Meyer (double bass). During the group's 2009-19 residency with the Indianapolis Symphony Orchestra, DePue was named the concertmaster of the orchestra, and in the summer of 2015, he decided to leave Tf3 and dedicate his full time to the orchestra. He was initially to be replaced by Canadian Nikki Chooi, who had also attended the Curtis Institute of Music, but Chooi was offered the Concertmaster's chair with the Metropolitan Opera Orchestra before he could replace DePue. Instead, Juilliard graduate Charles Yang, described by The Boston Globe as one who "...plays classical violin with the charisma of a rock star..." replaced DePue.

== Origins ==
The charter members of Time for Three met while students at the Curtis Institute of Music in Philadelphia, Pennsylvania. Initially, they discovered a mutual interest in bluegrass and country fiddling, and Meyer added jazz and improvisation to the mix as the three were "...playing together for fun..." Meyer and DePue were performing as members of the Philadelphia Orchestra when a thunderstorm knocked out the electricity. As electricians scurried to remedy the problem, they stepped up and played an acoustic jam session in the dark. The impromptu session's folk and country selections sparked interest in their eclectic work with Kendall and led to the trio becoming a professional unit.

== Career ==
Since becoming a formal performance ensemble in 2003, Time for Three has appeared alone and with symphonic and chamber orchestras all across the U.S.A. and in Europe. Tf3 has also played such diverse venues as Yoshi's, Indianapolis Colts games, the Indianapolis 500, and on the aircraft carrier museum ship USS Intrepid (CV-11) in New York Harbor.

Time for Three entered into a three year term as the first artists-in-residence with the Indianapolis Symphony Orchestra in 2009 and continued that residency for a full decade, until April, 2019, performing with and away from the orchestra and developing programs to widen the orchestra's appeal in the local community.

The trio are such frequently featured artists on NPR that they have their own Tf3 webpage there.

As a part of their educational outreach, Tf3 produced an anti-bullying video performing the Kanye West/Daft Punk song Stronger which was released on YouTube and was featured on CNN and The Huffington Post.

The group self-produced two CD albums which sold more than 20,000 copies before signing with E1 Music and releasing 3 Fervent Travelers in 2010. 3 Fervent Travelers debuted in the Billboard Crossover Charts Top 10 and remained there for more than 10 months.

The group signed with Universal Music Classics, and Time for Three was released in June 2014. The group's fourth album includes performances with guest performers Joshua Radin, Alisa Weilerstein, Branford Marsalis, Lily & Madeleine, and Jake Shimabukuro.

In order to widen its repertoire, Tf3 has been commissioning new musical works for their unique instrumentation and orchestra.

- Concerto 4-3, written by Pulitzer-Prize winning composer Jennifer Higdon was premiered with The Philadelphia Orchestra under Christoph Eschenbach in 2008. It has been performed dozens of times with other orchestras, including a recorded performance with the Fort Worth Symphony in 2012, and a 2013 performance with the Baltimore Symphony at Carnegie Hall. It was recorded with the Philadelphia Orchestra under Xian Zhang on the Grammy winning album, Letters for the Future in 2022.
- Travels in Time for Three by Chris Brubeck debuted in 2010 and was commissioned by the trio and a group of ten orchestras, including the Boston Pops and the Youngstown Symphony.
- The third work in the series is Games and Challenges by Pulitzer winner William Bolcom. It was commissioned by the Indianapolis Symphony and the Grand Rapids Symphony and premiered in 2013.

In June, 2014 Tf3 recorded a performance with the Indianapolis Symphony Orchestra that aired on PBS. Additionally, during 2014 and 2015, the group made five music videos of tunes from their latest album, which was released on June 24, 2014.

On November 17, 2014, Tf3 performed "Blame" on the semifinals of ABC's Dancing with the Stars for dancers Janel Parrish and Valentin Chmerkovskiy.

Charles Yang's entry into the group opened up new areas of musical exploration. His penchant for breaking into song added to the trio's spontaneity, They have since added several songs written by the members and others to their repertoire, including some with three part harmony, and Yang also plays guitar to introduce a different color to some tunes.

In February 2021, Tf3 partnered with cellist and composer Ben Sollee to put together the soundtrack to the new Focus Features' film Land, starring and directed by Robin Wright. The film premiered at the Sundance Film Festival on January 31. "We were so lucky to get Time for Three and Ben", says Wright. "It was so moving to be able to sit on Zoom and they just pick up their violin and say, 'let me play something for you. How about this?' And you're just weeping! Like, 'it's so beautiful! I love it!'"

The trio's sixth album was released in 2022. Letters for the Future was recorded with the Philadelphia Orchestra conducted by Xian Zhang. The album contains "Contacts", a concerto for string trio and orchestra by Kevin Puts and a new recording of the previously mentioned "Concerto 4-3" by Jennifer Higdon. The album won the Grammy Award for Best Classical Instrumental Solo for 2023. Kevin Puts' "Contact" also won the 2023 Grammy Award for Best Contemporary Classical Composition.

== Discography ==
=== Tf3 CDs ===
- Time for Three (Self-released, 2004)
- We Just Burned This for You! (Self-released, 2006)
- 3 Fervent Travelers (e1 Music, 2010)
- Time for Three (Deutsche Grammophon/Universal Classics, 2014)
- Yule Time (Deutsche Grammophon/Universal Classics, 2014)
- Letters for the Future (Deutsche Grammophon/Universal Classics, 2022)

=== Featured on ===
- Take Six by Fort Worth Symphony Orchestra (FWSO Live, 2012)
