= Victory (Ross Mintzer song) =

Single by Ross Mintzer
- Released: April 2013
- Recorded: 2013
- Genre: World music, folk rock, Gospel music, country music
- Length: 5:13
- Label: RPM LLC
- Songwriter(s): Ross Mintzer
- Producer(s): Benjamin Scheuer

Ross Mintzer singles chronology
"Two Step For A Rainy Day" (2005)	"Victory" (2013)	"Lost In America" (2013)

"Victory" is a song by American musician Ross Mintzer, released as a single 2013. "Victory" was recorded by the Ross Mintzer Band.

== Personnel ==
- Ross Mintzer - vocals, acoustic guitar
- Evan Shinners - piano
- Geoff Kraly- bass
- Joe Saylor - drums
- Kevin Ryan - harmonica
- Strait Gate Judah Choral
