= LeFerriere House =

Historic house in Vermont, United States

- U.S. National Register of Historic Places
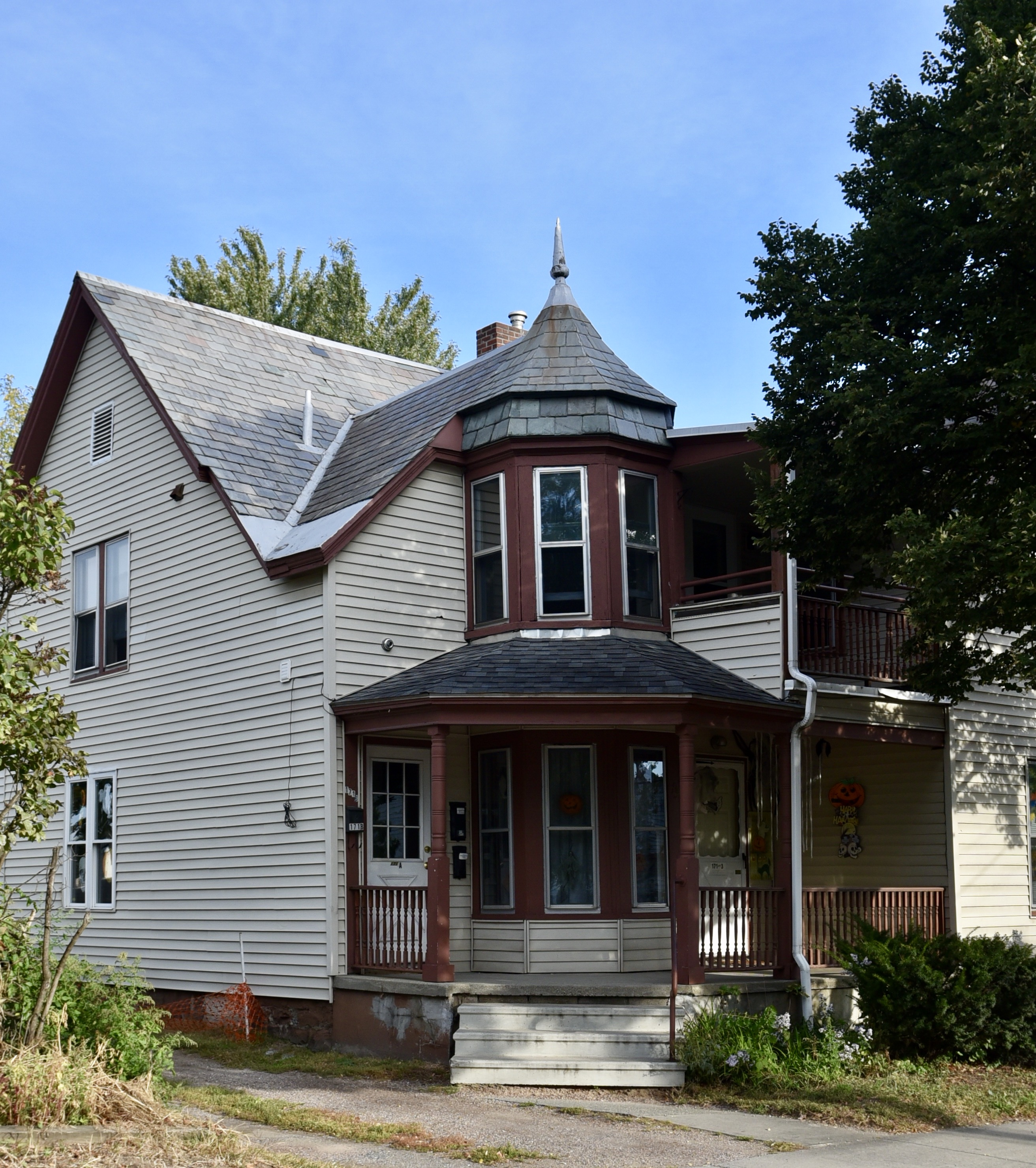

- Location within Vermont
- Location: 171-173 Intervale Ave., Burlington, Vermont
- Coordinates: 44°29′20″N 73°12′38″W
- Area: 0.2 acres (0.081 ha)
- Built: 1888
- Built by: LeFerriere, F.M.
- Architectural style: Queen Anne
- MPS: Burlington, Vermont MPS AD
- NRHP reference No.: 07000499
- Added to NRHP: August 8, 2008

The LeFerriere House is a historic house at 171-173 Intervale Avenue in Burlington, Vermont. Built about 1888 as worker housing in the city's Old North End, it is architecturally a distinctive vernacular interpretation of Queen Anne architecture. It was listed on the National Register of Historic Places in 2008 as the LeFarriere House.

== Description and history ==
The LeFerriere House stands near the northernmost extent of Burlington's Old North End neighborhood, on the west side of Intervale Avenue roughly midway between Willow and Oak Streets. It is a 1 1/2-story wood-frame structure, with irregular asymmetric massing. It has a complex multi-gabled roofline, clapboarded exterior, and a stone foundation. The highest roof ridge is parallel to the street, with forward projecting gabled wings. The front of the leftmost wing has the building's most distinctive feature, a low polygonal turret above a single-story porch with turned posts and balusters. A modern shed-roof ell extends to the rear. The interior retains many original features, including Corinthian columns in the room under the turret and cabinets in the kitchen.

The area where the LeFerriere House stands was rural for many years. Even though a subdivision including its parcel was laid out in 1855, the house itself was not built until about 1888 by F.M. LeFerriere, a French Canadian immigrant. It was originally built as a two-family, and may have been first occupied by extended members of the LeFerriere family. From 1910 to 1961 the house was occupied by two Jewish immigrant families, exemplifying a changing trend in immigration patterns. The house is now divided into three units.

== See also ==
- Mintzer House, next door
- National Register of Historic Places listings in Chittenden County, Vermont
