= Ross Mintzer =

American musician and performer (born 1987)

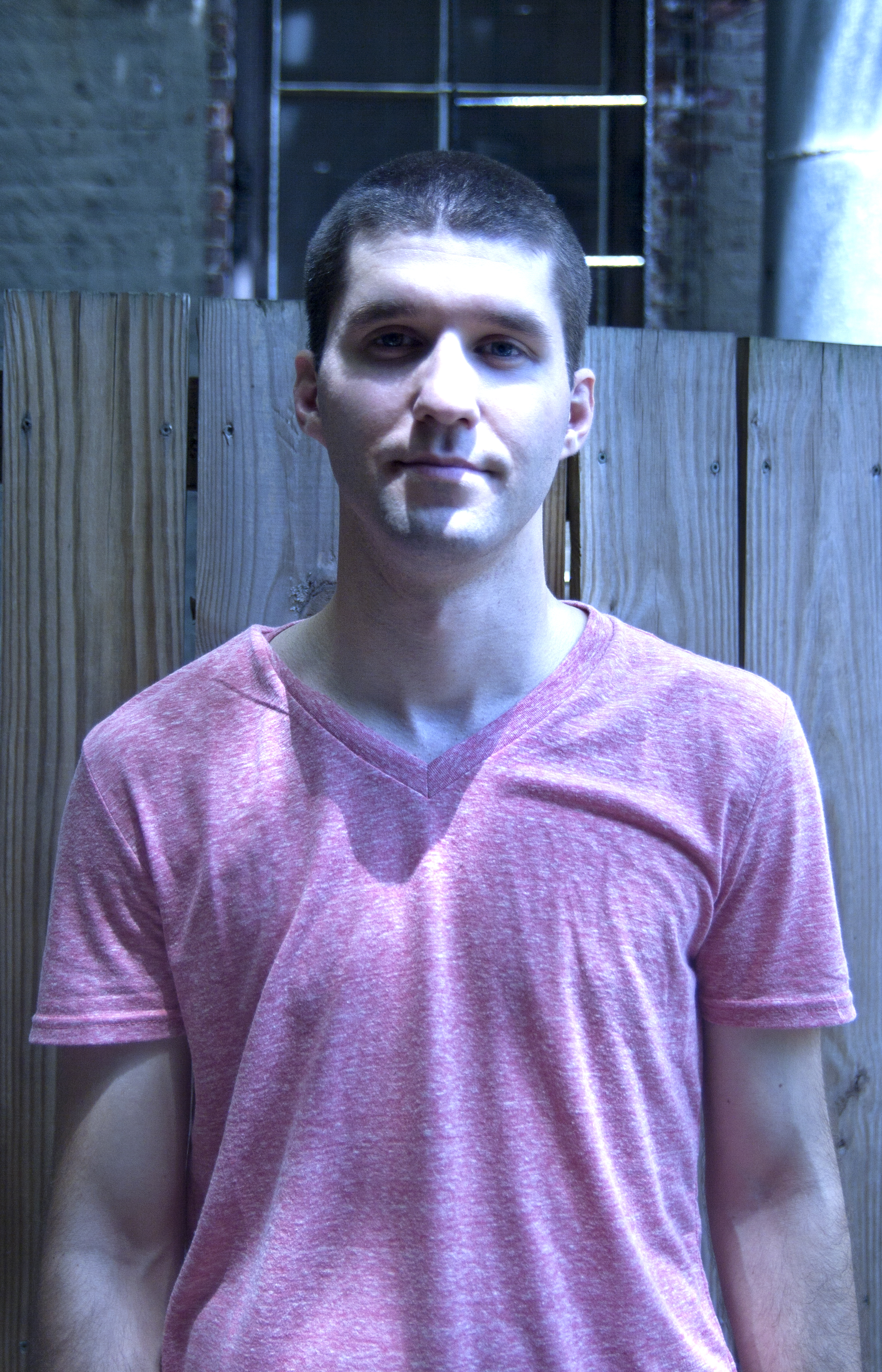
- Mintzer in 2013

Background information
- Born: May 26, 1987 (age 39); New York, New York
- Genres: World, pop, edm, rock, jazz
- Occupations: Singer-songwriter, musician
- Instruments: Vocals, guitar, tenor saxophone, alto saxophone, flute
- Years active: 2005–present
- Website: rossmintzer.com

Ross Philip Mintzer (born May 26, 1987) is an American musician, singer‑songwriter, and bandleader. Since 2012, he has been the lead vocalist and frontman of the Ross Mintzer Band. In June 2005, he appeared as a performer on National Public Radio's From the Top. In 2011, he started a girls' choir in Karachi, Pakistan and has been recognized by the National Association for Music Education.

== Early life ==
Mintzer was born on May 26, 1987, in New York City to parents Richard and Cheryl Mintzer. He is the grandson of Stanley Kushner, an electrical contractor, and traces his paternal family heritage to Lithuanian-Jewish immigrants. Influenced by his uncle, Grammy‑winning saxophonist Bob Mintzer, Ross began learning saxophone at age eight. He later expanded his musical skills to include flute, guitar, vocals, and composition.

While attending Mamaroneck High School, Mintzer played in both jazz ensemble and combo. He received additional training upon transferring at the Interlochen Arts Academy in Michigan and pursued college studies at the Manhattan School of Music. Mintzer also studied privately with New York saxophonist, Marc Mommaas.

In 2005, Mintzer was selected as one of 29 high‑school musicians for the Gibson/Baldwin Jazz Ensembles at the 47th Annual Grammy Awards, where he performed alongside Benny Golson at the Fonda Theatre in Hollywood. Mintzer performed at the Fonda Theatre in Hollywood with award-winning Jazz saxophonist Benny Golson. That same year, he appeared on NPR’s From the Top program, performing Bach’s Two‑Part Inventions with bassist Michael Thurber. Mintzer was also a co‑winner in DownBeat magazine’s 28th annual Student Awards in both the Blues/Pop/Rock Soloist and Jazz Instrumental Soloist categories. Additionally, he was invited to perform for the Jazziz On Disc compilation issued with Jazziz magazine’s October 2005 edition.

== Career ==
=== 2005–2012: Remington and Music in Pakistan ===
Between 2005 and 2012, Mintzer was guitarist and composer for the ensemble Remington, initially a duo with Michael Thurber, later joined by drummer Greg Evans. The Band was named after their mentor David Remington. He toured nationally with Thurber, starting music clinics at schools.

In February 2011, Mintzer joined the faculty of the American University of Sharjah’s Performing Arts Department. From October 2011 to February 2012, he taught music and English at The Garage School in Karachi, Pakistan, where he directed a girls’ choir. In June 2012, Mintzer biked across the United States to commemorate American military personnel and draw attention to civilian casualties in Pakistan.

=== 2012–present: Ross Mintzer ===
Mintzer formed the Ross Mintzer Band in 2012, releasing singles such as Victory, World Goes Round, and Lost in America in 2013. The band performed across cities including Chicago, Los Angeles, and New York. In February 2014, Mintzer appeared on NHK’s World Wave Morning, performing and interviewing about his song Open Happiness.

On May 5, 2014, the Tri‑M Music Honor Society gave him honorary life membership for contributions to music education. On July 7, 2015, Mintzer performed The Star‑Spangled Banner before a Sky Sox baseball game in Colorado Spring.

Mintzer recorded and released several solo singles from 2015 to 2020, including Refugee (2015), Stronger (2016), and Destiny featuring Xav A. (2018). He held a part-time instructor position at Jazz at Lincoln Center’s WeBop program in 2016 and 2017.

In 2016, Mintzer collaborated with electronic producer Adessi on the single Breathe, which blended progressive house music with jazz-inspired brass and Middle Eastern instrumentation, accompanied by an experimental music video directed by Aiman Hassani.

Mintzer released his first solo EP Imagine on September 20, 2018. He released The Owl on February 13, 2019. In May 2019, Mintzer performed alongside Afghan social activist Fereshteh Forough at an event at The Regency in Brooklyn. Later that year, he gave a community performance at Mamaroneck High School in New York.

In 2023, he released electronic singles including Silent Glow, Lucid, and Frndly Stars. The track Lucid and his evolving sound, which combines live saxophone performance with EDM production, were examined by Dancing Astronaut in 2024. That same year, his music received attention from We Rave You, which discussed his fusion of genres and incorporation of diverse cultural influences. In November 2024, Mintzer performed at the Pablo Center in Eau Claire, Wisconsin, in a live show that included supporting acts DOKTOR and Nolephant.

In 2025, Mintzer released the album aimless mystics, an eight-track self-produced record incorporating elements of pop, electronic dance music, and live saxophone. The album was developed over a period of approximately two years, with some material reportedly performed live before the studio versions were finalized. Its title and conceptual framework draw on Buddhist philosophy, particularly the idea of "aimlessness".

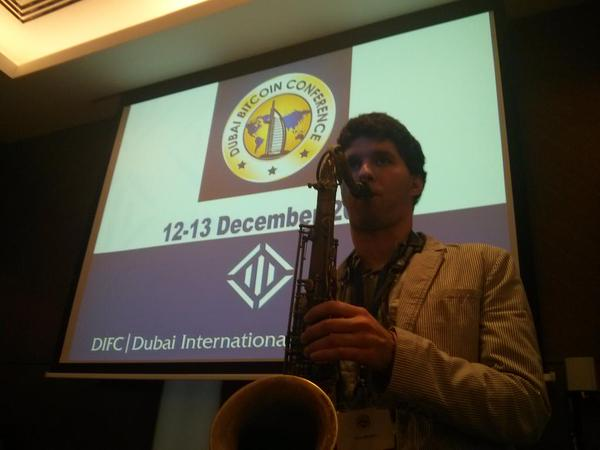
Performing Saxophone at the Dubai Bitcoin Conference at the Dubai International Financial Center in the United Arab Emirates(December 12, 2014)

== Musical style ==
Mintzer's musical style combines elements of jazz, pop, rock, and electronic dance music, integrating live instrumentation with digital production. Influenced by his uncle, Grammy-winning saxophonist Bob Mintzer, he incorporates saxophone and guitar solos into electronically produced tracks. Tracks such as Victory, World Goes Round, and Lucid illustrate this blend of acoustic and electronic components.

His live performances often include synchronized visuals, such as lighting and laser displays, designed in collaboration with producer Max Koehler. His 2024 performance at the Pablo Center included visual elements synchronized with the setlist and drew on themes from Mintzer’s Ashkenazi Jewish heritage, incorporating the biblical story of Joseph and the concept of dreams to explore identity and personal growth.

== Discography ==
=== Albums ===
Title	Release date	Format	Label	Notes / Reception
aimless mystics	October 23, 2025	Album	RPM LLC	Eight-track album

=== EPs with Remington ===
Title	Release year	Format	Label	Notes
Songs for Our Friends	2007	EP	Remington / Independent	Early Remington release
Thank You Mr. Remington	2008	EP	Independent	
Warm Winter	2008	EP	Independent	
Human Music	2009	EP	Independent	

=== Singles with the Ross Mintzer Band ===
Title	Release date	Format	Label	Notes / Reception
Victory	April 2013	Single	RPM LLC	Early band release
World Goes Round	April 2013	Single	RPM LLC	Performed internationally
Lost in America	August 2013	Single	RPM LLC	Band release
Freedom	2013	Single	RPM LLC	Band release
Open Happiness (feat. Milton Vann)	2013	Single	RPM LLC	Performed live on NHK Japan

=== Selected Solo Singles and EPs ===
Title	Release date	Format	Label	Notes / Reception
Guayaquil	2005	Single	Independent	Early jazz single from Interlochen Arts Academy compilation
Two Step for a Rainy Day	August 1, 2005	Single	Jazz at Interlochen	From *The Interlochen Arts Academy Jazz Combo* CD
Refugee	2015	Single	Independent	
Stronger	2016	Single	Independent	
Breathe (feat. Adessi)	2016	Single	Independent	Collaboration
Destiny (feat. Xav A.)	January 7, 2018	Single	Independent	Collaboration
Imagine	September 20, 2018	EP	Independent	First solo EP
The Owl	February 13, 2019	Single	Independent	
See You Again	2019	Single	Independent	Released as part of 2019 solo work
Remember	2019	Single	Independent	Released as part of 2019 solo work
Feels The Same	2019	Single	Independent	Released as part of 2019 solo work
Days	2019	Single	Independent	Released as part of 2019 solo work
Love Me The Way I Am	2020	Single	Independent	Later solo single
Magician	2021	Single	Independent	
Shadows	2022	Single	Independent	
Rain	2022	Single	Independent	
Reflection	2022	Single	Independent	
The Fire	2022	Single	Independent	
Lucid	2023	Single	Independent/Digital	Profiled in Dancing Astronaut for EDM-jazz fusion style
Silent Glow	2023	Single	Independent	
Frndly Stars	2023	Single	Independent	
