= Tessa Lark =

American concert violinist from Kentucky

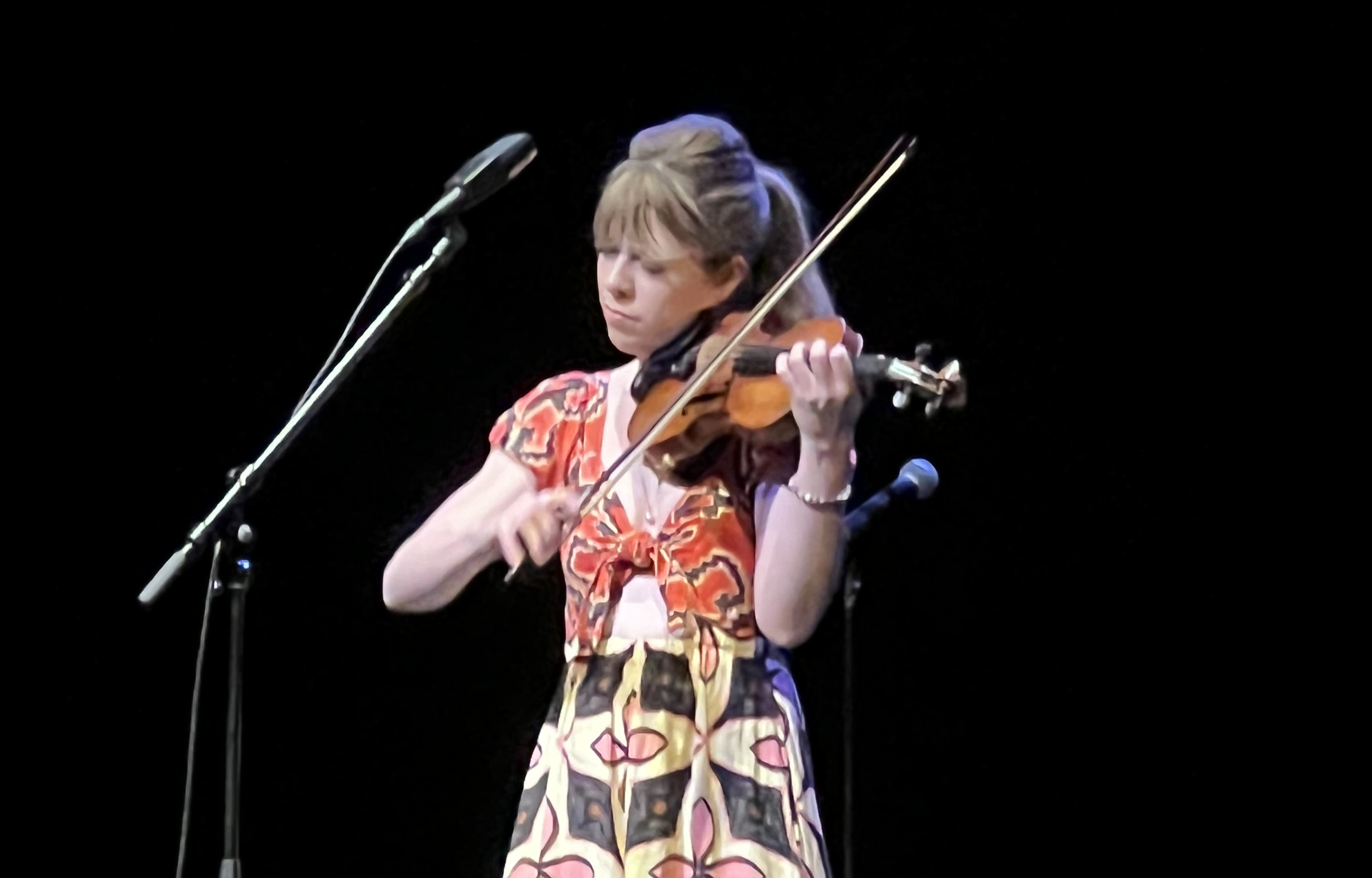
- Lark in 2024

Background information
- Born: Tessa Lark Frederick; Richmond, Kentucky, U.S.
- Occupation: Concert violinist
- Instruments: Violin

Tessa Lark is an American concert violinist.

== Early life ==
Lark was born and raised in Richmond, Kentucky. She started violin training at age six through the Suzuki method. Her musical career began performing and recording with her father's Gospel Bluegrass band, Narrow Road. She made her concerto debut at age 16 playing Mozart's Violin Concerto Number 3 in G major with the Cincinnati Symphony. Lark was accepted into Cincinnati College-Conservatory of Music's Starling Preparatory Strings Project where she studied privately with Kurt Sassmannshaus.

At age 16, Lark was accepted into The New England Conservatory (NEC), where she completed her Bachelor and master's degrees. Lark also studied at The Juilliard School and studied in their Artist Diploma program until completion in 2017. Her private instructors at NEC were Miriam Fried and Lucy Chapman; at Juilliard, she studied with Sylvia Rosenberg, Ida Kavafian and Daniel Phillips.

== Career ==
=== Soloist ===
Lark has been a featured soloist with U.S. orchestras including the Buffalo and Binghamton Philharmonics; the Cincinnati, Albany, Indianapolis, Longwood, New Haven, Hawaii, Santa Fe, Cheyenne, Santa Cruz, and Peninsula symphony orchestras; the Louisville Orchestra; CityMusic Cleveland; the New Juilliard Ensemble Chamber Orchestras; and internationally with the Chinese Opera and Ballet Symphony.

In 2015 and 2018, she was a soloist with the Naumburg Orchestral Concerts, in the Naumburg Bandshell, Central Park, in the summer series.

In 2016, Lark commissioned composer Michael Thurber to write her the violin concerto "Love Letter", which was premiered by the Carmel Symphony Orchestra in February 2018. Also in 2016, she commissioned Michael Torke through the Distinctive Debuts recital at Carnegie Hall to write "Spoon Bread", a sonata for violin and piano. She premiered it in 2017 at Weill Hall with pianist Roman Rabinovich.

In 2018, Torke wrote the violin concerto "Sky" for Lark, which she premiered with the Albany Symphony Orchestra in January 2019. She was nominated for a 2020 Grammy Award in the "Best Classical Instrument Solo" category for the recording.

In 2017, Lark gave a solo recital at Carnegie Hall's Weill Recital Hall as part of Carnegie's Distinctive Debuts series. Lark has also given recitals at Amsterdam's Concertgebouw, the Isabella Stewart Gardner Museum in Boston, the Perlman Music Program, San Francisco Performances, Dame Myra Hess Memorial Concerts, Ravinia's Bennett-Gordon Classics series, Troy Chromatic Concerts, Chamber Music Tulsa, Caramoor's Wednesday Morning Concerts, the Seattle Chamber Music Society, the Phillips Collection in Washington, D.C. and the Marlboro music festival.

=== Chamber music ===
Lark has toured with musicians from Ravinia's Steans Music Institute and with Musicians from Marlboro. She has performed at the Seattle Chamber Music Society and her piano trio, Namirovsky-Lark-Pae, won the 2012 Fischoff National Chamber Music Competition. She is also a member of the Caramoor Virtuosi.

=== American folk music ===
In 2014, she was featured on Mark O'Connor's album MOC4.

== Awards and nominations ==
In 2018, Lark received a Borletti-Buitoni Trust Fellowship. In 2016, she received an Avery Fisher Career Grant. In 2014, she received a career grant from the Leonore Annenberg Fellowship Fund for the Performing and Visual Arts. She was the silver medalist in the 9th Quadrennial International Violin Competition of Indianapolis (IVCI), and winner of the 2012 Walter W. Naumburg International Violin Competition.
