= Mintzer House =

Historic house in Vermont, United States

- U.S. National Register of Historic Places
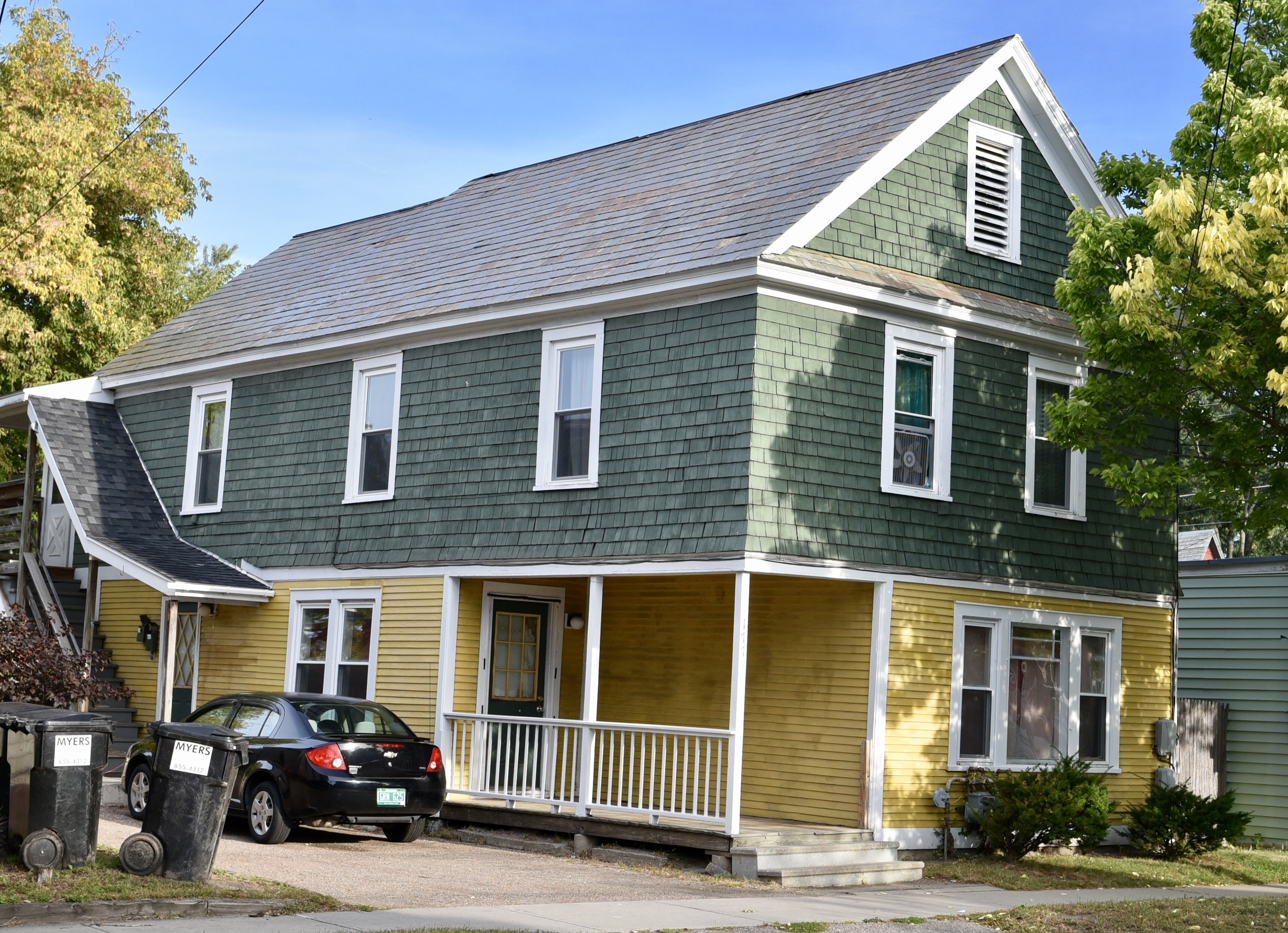

- Location within Vermont Location within the United States
- Location: 175-177 Intervale Ave., Burlington, Vermont
- Coordinates: 44°29′20″N 73°12′38″W
- Area: 0.1 acres (0.040 ha)
- Built: 1898
- Architectural style: Colonial Revival
- MPS: Burlington, Vermont MPS AD
- NRHP reference No.: 07000498
- Added to NRHP: August 8, 2008

The Mintzer House is a historic house at 175-177 Intervale Avenue in Burlington, Vermont. Built as a single-family home about 1898, it is well-preserved example of vernacular Colonial Revival architecture built as worker housing. Now a duplex, it was listed on the National Register of Historic Places in 2008.

== Description and history ==
The Mintzer House stands near the northernmost extent of Burlington's Old North End neighborhood, on the west side of Intervale Avenue roughly midway between Willow and Oak Streets. It is a two-story wood-frame structure, with a gabled roof, stone foundation, and an exterior finished in a combination of wooden clapboards and shingles. A recessed porch extends partway along the left side, with an outside sheltered stairway providing access to a rear porch on the same side. The front of the house has a three-part window on the ground floor with stained glass detailing. The interior retains a number of original Colonial Revival details, especially in what is now the second-floor unit.

The area where the Mintzer House stands was rural for many years. Even though a subdivision including its parcel was laid out in 1855, the house was not built until about 1898, and has seen a succession of working-class immigrant residents. The earliest documented resident was William Bessette, a French Canadian, who was a barber. In 1906 it was acquired by the Mintzer family, Russian Jewish immigrants. About 1919 a commercial storefront was added to the front, and part of the building was used as a small shop. This storefront was later removed, when the building was converted to two-family use.

== See also ==
- LeFerriere House, next door
- National Register of Historic Places listings in Chittenden County, Vermont
