= Two Step for a Rainy Day =

"Two Step For A Rainy Day"

Single by Ross Mintzer

from the album The Interlochen Arts Academy Jazz Combo
- Released: 1 August 2005
- Recorded: 2005
- Genre: Jazz
- Length: 6:48
- Label: Jazz at Interlochen
- Songwriter(s): Ross Mintzer
- Producer(s): Interlochen Center For The Arts

Ross Mintzer singles chronology
"Guayaquil" (2005)	"Two Step For A Rainy Day" (2005)

"Two Step For A Rainy Day" is a Jazz song, written and performed by Ross Mintzer from the album “The Interlochen Arts Academy Jazz Combo” a CD issued in 2005."Two Step For A Rainy Day" includes musicians from the Interlochen Center For The Arts
