= From the Top =

Nonprofit organization and radio and television series

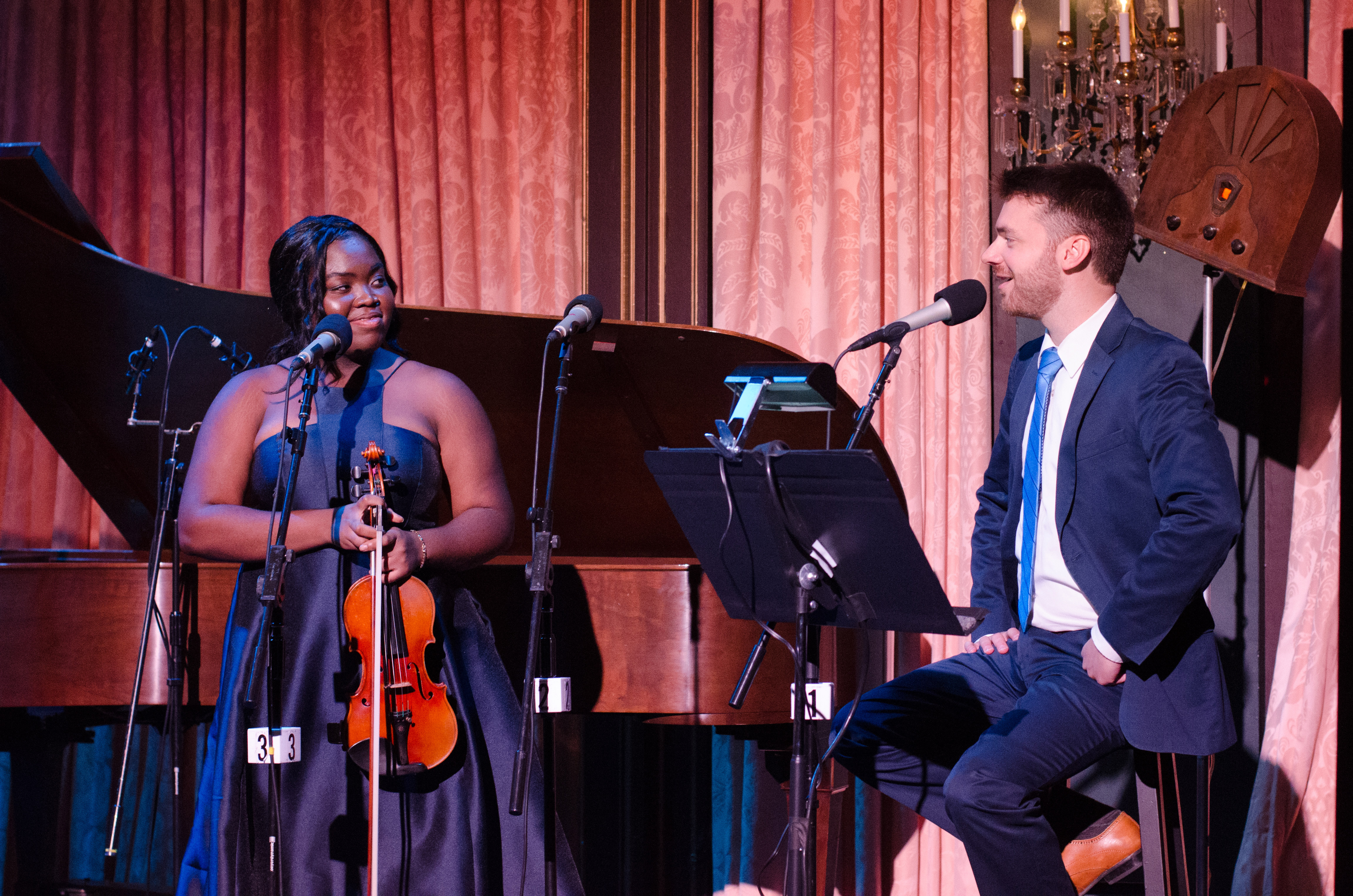
Host Peter Dugan interviews 18-year-old violinist Akili Farrow on NPR's From the Top

From the Top is an independent nonprofit organization known best for its longstanding NPR radio and PBS television programs with the same name. Co-founded by Gerald Slavet and Jennifer Hurley-Wales in 1995, the organization showcases and develops emerging classical musicians through live events, radio and video broadcasts, scholarships, and arts education programs aimed at empowering young citizen-artists.

== About ==
From the Top is America's largest national platform celebrating the stories, talents, and character of young classically trained musicians. Through a unique balance of storytelling and musical performance, From the Top has made its mark, sharing stories and music of more than 3,000 emerging artists to a national audience.

From inception through the Oct. 22, 2018, episode, it was hosted by pianist Christopher O'Riley. Pianist and alum Peter Dugan, who had been a guest host during the 2018–2019 season, is the permanent host for its nationally distributed NPR radio program, starting with the 2020–21 season. Joining Dugan is a distinguished group of musicians as co-hosts and creatives including Vijay Gupta, Alex Laing, Tessa Lark, Orli Shaham and Charles Yang.

== Awards ==
From the Top received two daytime Emmy Awards in 2007 and 2008 for its PBS series, From the Top Live at Carnegie Hall.

== Scholarships ==
Since 2006, From the Top and the Jack Kent Cooke Foundation have awarded over $3 million in scholarships to exceptional young musicians with financial need through the Jack Kent Cooke Young Artist Award Scholarship.

In addition to providing young artists with an opportunity to perform on From the Top's national broadcasts, recipients are awarded up to $10,000 to help offset the costs of studying classical music at a high level.

Each year, From the Top chooses approximately 20 exceptional pre-collegiate musicians ages 8–18 to receive the award.

== Notable alumni ==
From the Top has featured over 3,000 diverse musicians who now perform professional in the nation's top orchestras, enjoy solo careers, educate, study astrophysics, and work to employ music as a tool to improve their communities.

Alumni news, stories and other information is shared via social media and the From the Top website.

== Controversy ==
The decision to not renew Christopher O'Riley's contract as host in 2018 provoked a number of negative reactions. Norman Lebrecht dubbed the press release by the organization announcing the change "patronizing."

Lawrence Christon after noting the stated desire of the organization to embrace the expanding media landscape averred, "The truth is however that [From the Top] doesn’t know exactly what it wants to do or how it’s going to do it. And clearly they don’t know what the art of the interview consists of and what intangibles O’Riley has brought in the tender levity of his conversations with [From the Top] kids, the impeccable musicianship which made him their ideal dance partner, and the unique tone he contributed to help define the show."

Mike Janssen reports O'Riley rebuffed the offer of a bonus recognizing his work with From the Top (the organization) and quotes O'Riley as stating, "I am From the Top. For the intents and purposes of the perception of the audience, meaning stations and the kids who have been on the show, it’s not the organization. It’s me.”

Longtime Prairie Home Companion host Garrison Keillor responded upon news of the change, "This was one of the best shows on radio. What a shame. Public radio management seems to be in a KGB mode. I’m grateful I had a career before the curtain fell."

O'Riley on his website has asserted, "... I believe I was dismissed ... largely because of my political social media engagement being perceived as inappropriate."

O'Riley in a November 5, 2019 Facebook post noted, "This week I also heard of a recent guest host interviewing a young pianist and saying 'Cool!' 17 times in the course of their brief conversation; the host, not the kid (we would never seek to limit the expressions of our guests). Quite the clownshow over there, I guess. From the Big Top?"
