= Roman Rabinovich =

Israeli pianist (born 1985)

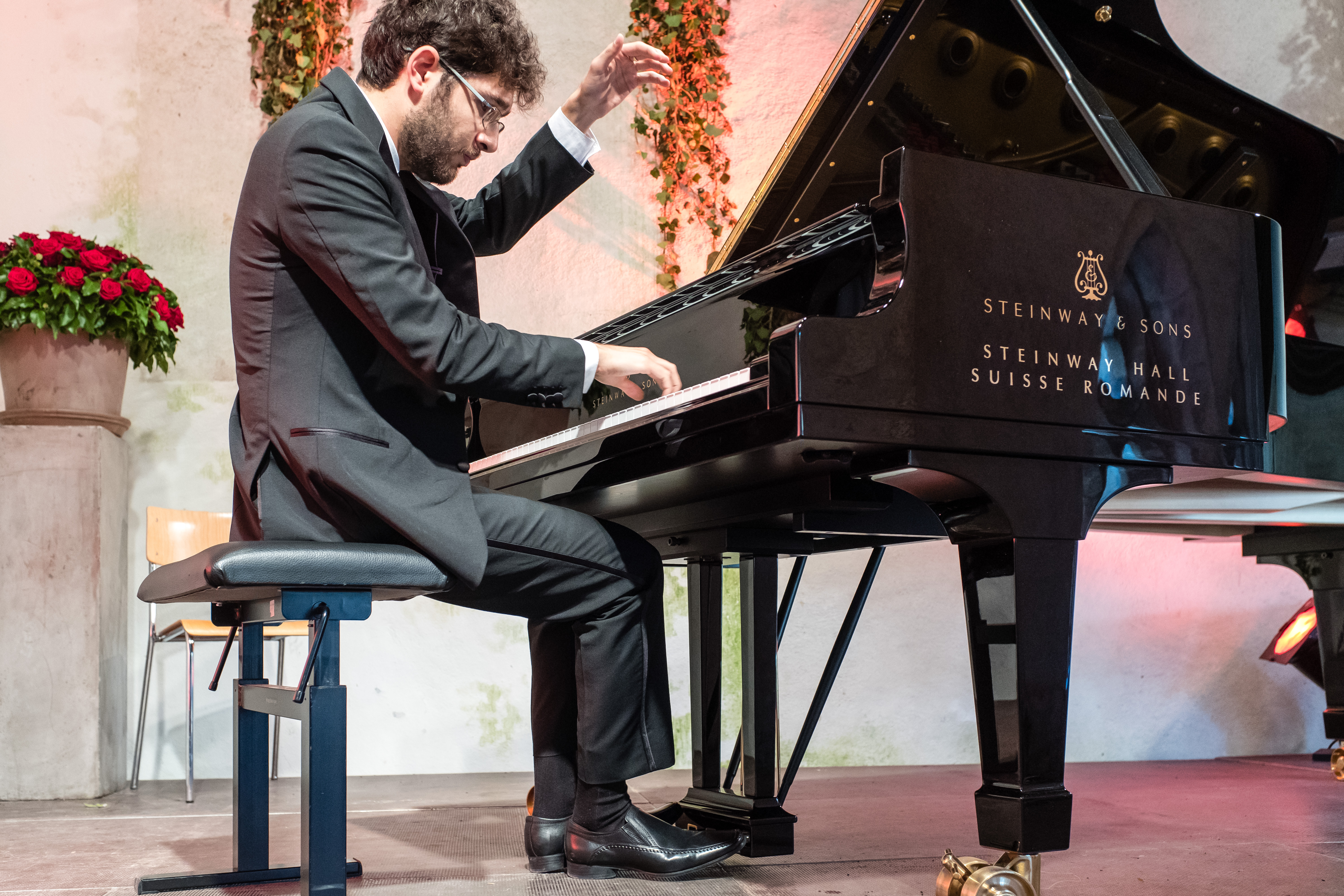
Roman Rabinovich at the Piano à Saint-Ursanne festival in August 2017

Roman Rabinovich in 2008, performing Schumann's Fantasy Pieces op. 73 together with cellist Narek Hakhnazaryan

Roman Rabinovich (Hebrew: 'רומן רבינוביץ) is an Israeli pianist. He was born in Tashkent, Uzbekistan, in 1985 and in 1994 emigrated with his family to Israel, where he studied at the Buchmann-Mehta School of Music. Rabinovich won the 2008 Arthur Rubinstein International Piano Master Competition. He has performed in the United States, Europe, and Israel at places such as Gewandhaus, Wigmore Hall, Carnegie Hall, the Metropolitan Museum of Art, and the John F. Kennedy Center for the Performing Arts. He is a graduate of the Curtis Institute of Music, where he studied with Seymour Lipkin.
