= Charles Yang (violinist) =

American violinist, composer and singer

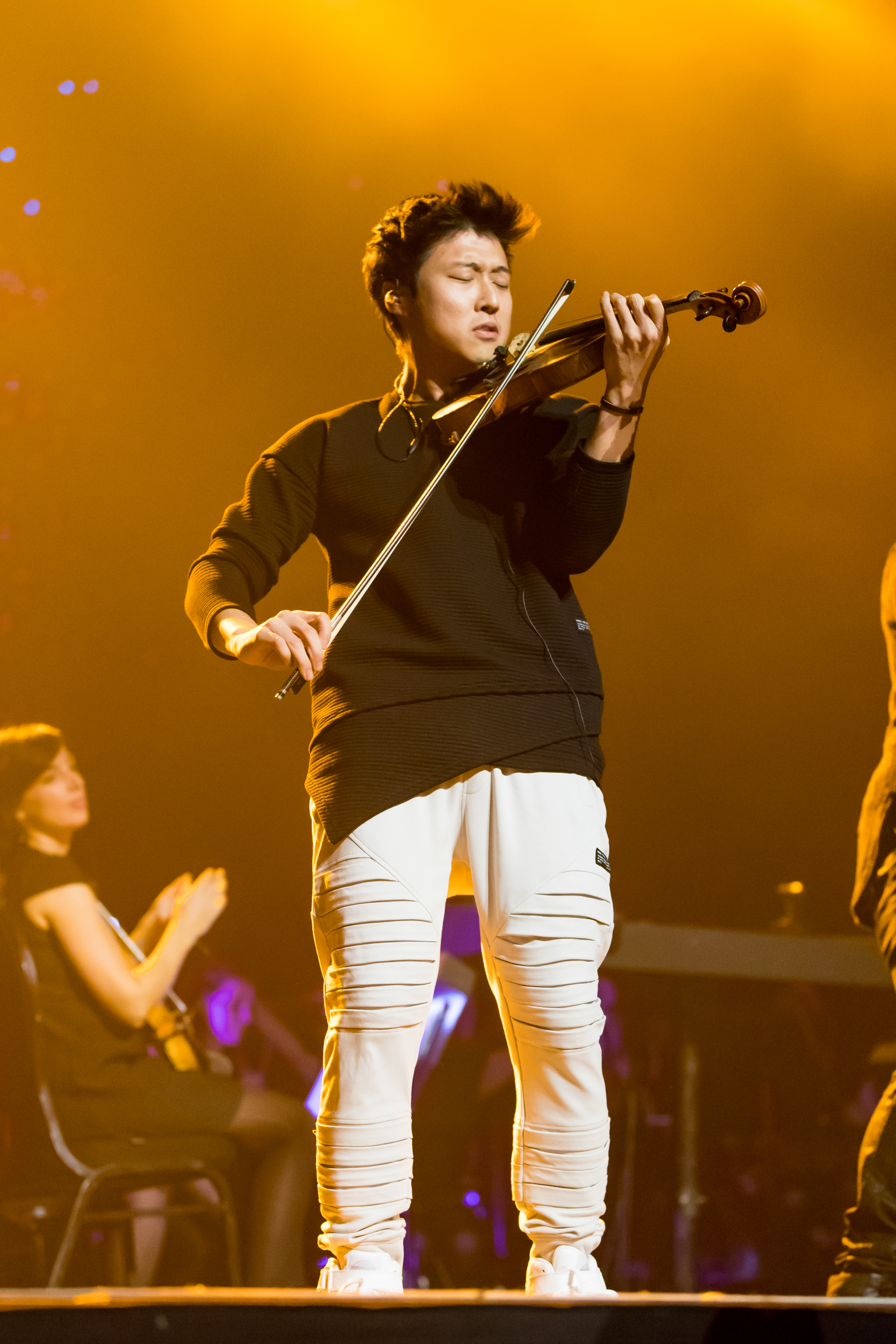
Yang in 2016

Charles Yang (born 1988) is an American violinist, composer and singer, who currently performs with the classically trained string trio Time for Three.

Born in Austin, Yang began his violin studies with his mother at the age of three and later went on to study with Kurt Sassmannshaus, Paul Kantor, and Brian Lewis. He received his bachelor of music and master of music degrees at The Juilliard School under Glenn Dicterow. Yang's improvisational crossover abilities as a violinist, electric violinist, and vocalist have led to performances across the United States, Europe, and Asia. He has performed at Carnegie Hall and the Forbidden City in Beijing and has collaborated with artists including Peter Dugan, CDZA, Marcelo Gomes, Jake Shimabukuro, and Jesse Colin Young. In 2013, Twyla Tharp selected Yang to be the violin soloist for the revival of her work "Bach Partita" with the American Ballet Theatre. In 2016, Yang joined Time for Three, where he combines classical violin, improvisation, and vocals.
