= Lost in America (Ross Mintzer song) =

"Lost In America"

Single by Ross Mintzer
- Released: August 2013
- Recorded: 2013
- Genre: World Music, Rock
- Length: 5:04
- Label: RPM LLC
- Songwriter(s): Ross Mintzer
- Producer(s): Benjamin Scheuer

Ross Mintzer singles chronology
"World Goes Round" (2013)	"Lost In America" (2013)	"Freedom" (2013)

"Lost In America" is a song by American musician Ross Mintzer, released as a single 2013. "Lost In America" was recorded by the Ross Mintzer Band.

== Personnel ==
- Ross Mintzer - vocals, acoustic guitar
- Milton Vann - Vocals
- Julian Varner - Piano and Organ
- Geoff Kraly - Bass
- Josh Dion - Drums
- Kevin Ryan - Harmonica
