= Ludwig Streicher =

Austrian musician (1920–2003)

Ludwig Streicher 1974 on musical tour of Southern Africa, organised by Hans Adler

Ludwig Streicher (26 June 1920 – 11 March 2003) was a contrabassist from Vienna, Austria. Familiar to many as the former principal bass of the Vienna Philharmonic Orchestra and bass soloist, he is also known as an instructor and as the author of a contrabass textbook.

== Early life ==
Streicher's love for music (which he called Musizieren) was influenced by his father. His parents owned an inn located in Ziersdorf, Lower Austria. There, his father led a local brass band. His father gave Streicher his first violin lessons.

== Career ==
At age 14, he attended Vienna Music Academy, switching to double bass. He studied with students of Franz Simandl, a famous double bass soloist. Streicher graduated in 1940 and spent the next four years serving as principal bass at the Kraków National Theater. He was suddenly conscripted by the German Wehrmacht, which was followed by Russian imprisonment. In 1945, he escaped on foot and joined the Vienna Philharmonic, spending 19 years (1954 - 1973) as principal. During this time, he claimed to have hitched a ride in a Russian tank to audition for the Orchestra of the Vienna State Opera. In April 1966, he gave his first solo concert in Wels. The raging success took him to the Middle East, America, Africa, Japan, Korea, and Taiwan. As a soloist he recorded pieces ranging from Carl Ditters von Dittersdorf's 18th century compositions to contemporary contrabass pieces.

After the tour, Streicher devoted his time to instructing young students at the Vienna Musical Theater Academy and at the Escuela Superior de Música Reina Sofía (Queen Sofía College of Music) in Madrid.
