= Franz Simandl =

Franz Simandl

Franz Simandl (August 1, 1840 – December 15, 1912) was a double-bassist and pedagogue from Austria-Hungary most remembered for his book New Method for String Bass, known as the "Simandl book", which is to this day used as a standard study of double bass technique and hand positions.

His approach uses the first, second, and fourth fingers of the left hand (the third and fourth operating together as one digit) to stop the strings in the lower register of the instrument and divide the fingerboard into various positions.

The second volume of the method looks at the use of thumb position using the thumb, first, second and third fingers, to play solo, high register work and again dividing the fingerboard up into a concept of positions. The second volume also delves extensively into the playing of harmonics.

Simandl's "New Method" of playing, originally published in 1881, is still common among classical double bassists, Modern adaptations of, extensions to, and challenges to Simandl doctrines are acknowledged.

Simandl studied at the Prague Conservatory with Josef Hrabě before becoming the principal bassist in the Vienna Court Opera Orchestra. He was a professor of double-bass at the Vienna Conservatory from 1869 to 1910. His pupils include many of the leading bassists of his time such as Ludwig Manoly, who moved to New York City to become principal bass of the New York Philharmonic and was an influential teacher.

The Simandl "family tree" of bass pedagogues extends for many generations. Prominent bassist/educators who can trace their lineage directly back to Simandl include Adolf Mišek, Richard Davis, Mark Dresser, Joseph Guastafeste, Greg Sarchet, Gary Karr, Hermann Reinshagen, Karl E. H. Seigfried, Ludwig Streicher, Bertram Turetzky, and Frederick Zimmermann.
