= Adolf Míšek =

Czech double bassist and composer

Adolf Míšek (29 August 1875 – 20 October 1955) was a Czech double bassist and composer of the late romantic era.

== Life ==
Adolf Míšek was born in the village of Modletín, Bohemia, Austria-Hungary (today part of Rušinov, Czech Republic). He left for Vienna at the age of 15 to study with Franz Simandl at the Vienna Conservatory. At the age of 23, Míšek joined the orchestra of the state opera in Vienna –- a post he held concurrently with the professorship at the conservatory after the departure of Simandl in 1910–1914. After the World War I he left for Prague in 1920 to join the National Theatre as principal bassist and soloist. He taught also at the Prague Conservatory 1920–1934. He died on 20 October 1955 in Prague.

== Works ==
=== Compositions for double bass ===
- Capriccio (1899)
- Concert Polonaise (1903)
- Legenda op. 3 (1903)
- Sonata in A major op. 5 (1909)
- Sonata in E minor op. 6 (1911)
- Sonata in F major op. 7 (rev. 1955)

=== Chamber music ===
- Kinderherzen op. 21 for violin (1903)
- Drei Tonstücke op. 22 for violin (1904)
- Sonatinka pro housle ve snadném slohu (for violin)
- Sonata for violin in E major
- Sonatina for violoncello
- Idyla for violoncello
- Piano trio op. 20 (1904)
- String quartet in A major
- String quartet in D major
- String quintet in E flat major (2v, vla, vc, cb)

=== Songs ===
- Čtverlístek písní op. 11
- Zdrávas Maria
- Čtvero písní (1930)

=== Pedagogic literature ===
- Method for scales and arpeggios for double bass with piano

Míšek wrote arrangements of Czech folk songs for choir, arranged various pieces for violin and double bass and he composed couple of marches and other pieces for wind ensembles.
