= Bogdon Box Bass =

Bogdon Box Bass is an acoustic/electric cardboard box upright bass musical instrument. The 2-string box bass is tuned to E-A and the 3-string box bass is tuned to E-A-D (or A-D-G). The neck is made of red oak, the strings are nylon weed whacker twine. The tone can be warm and natural. The Bogdon Box Bass was originally available only as a kit that needs to be assembled. The National Association of Musical Merchandisers awarded the Bogdon-3 as Best in Show at the Summer 2008 exhibition. It is a Michigan product available worldwide.
