= Ludwig Manoly =

Ludwig Manoly (1855–1932) was a Hungarian-born double bassist who studied in Vienna and upon completing his studies, spent his life in the United States. He was principal bass of the New York Philharmonic from 1892, after performing with the orchestra since 1880, and faculty at the National Conservatory, under the direction of Antonín Dvořák, and the Institute of Musical Art, which later became the Juilliard School.

Manoly originally came to Vienna as a boy soprano, who had an exceptional voice in choral music. Upon arriving in Vienna at the age of fifteen, he found his voice changing and unable to audition at the Conservatory. However, there was a scholarship to study the double bass which he took up. At the Vienna Conservatory, he studied double bass with Franz Simandl; harmony, counterpoint, and composition with Anton Bruckner; and conducting with Joseph Hellmesberger. Graduating in 1876, he moved to the United States where he performed with the Theodore Thomas Orchestra, the Mendelssohn Quintette Club of Boston, and the Boston Symphony Orchestra. He joined the Philharmonic Society of New York and the Philharmonic Club, which later turned into the New York Philharmonic in 1880, eventually becoming principal bass of the ensemble in 1892, and later performed with the Metropolitan Opera Orchestra. Through his life, he came in contact with such individuals as Brahms, Liszt, Wagner, Saint-Saëns, Tchaikovsky, Anton Rubinstein, Bruckner, Richard Strauss, Mahler, Max Bruch, Carl Goldmark, Verdi, Jacques Offenbach, Johann Strauss, and Eduard Strauss.

Manoly's compositions include a number of works for double bass and a flute concerto for Georges Barrère, who was principal flute of the New York Philharmonic from 1905 to 1928. His students included Herman Reinshagen.
