= List of classical double bass players =

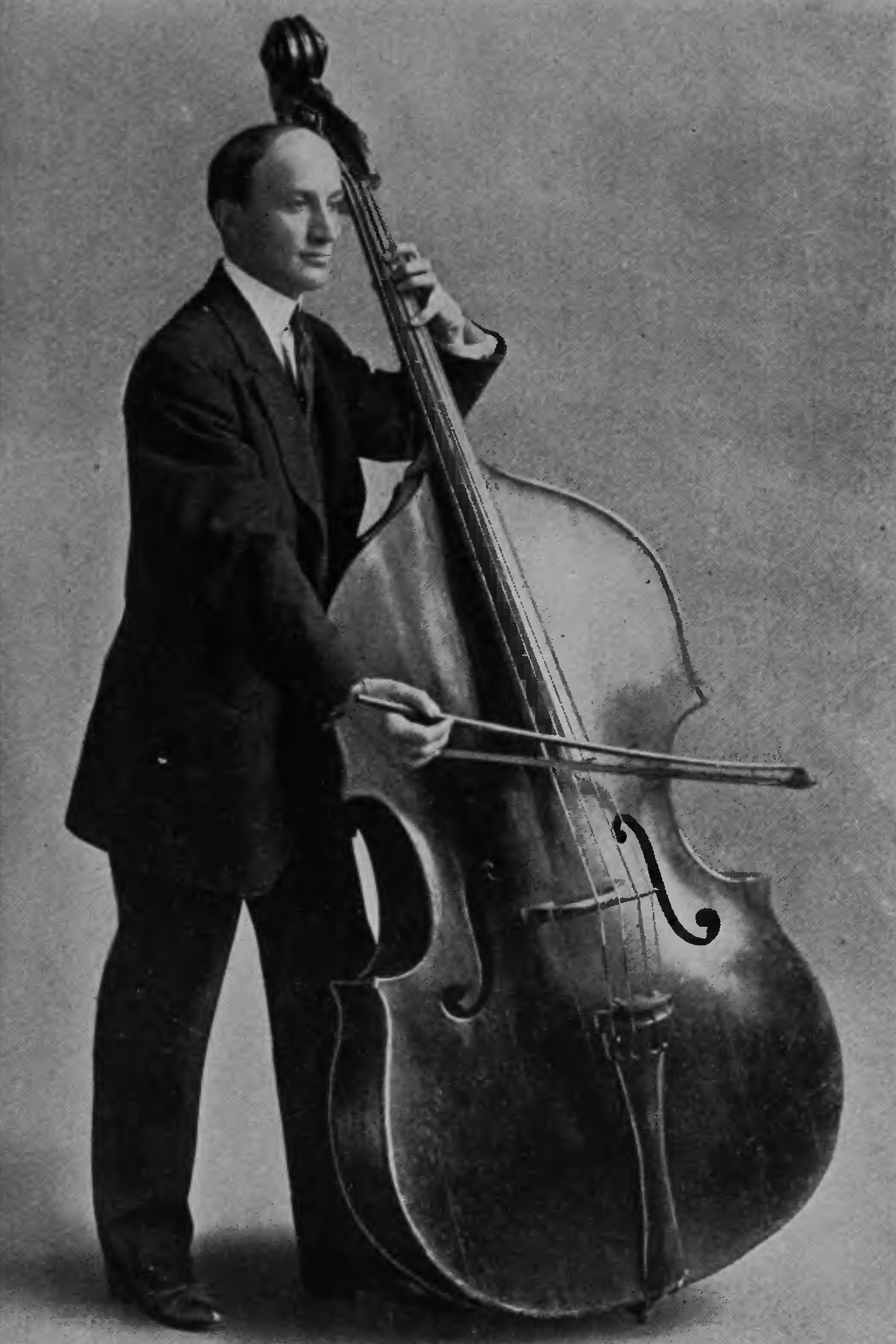
Umberto Buldrini, principal double bass with the New York Philharmonic

Classical double bass players are performers who play the double bass, the largest and lowest-pitched commonly played bowed string instrument. They perform European art music ranging from Baroque suites and Mozart-era Classical pieces to contemporary and avant-garde works in a variety of settings, ranging from large symphony orchestras to small chamber groups, or as soloists. Historical double bassists such as Domenico Dragonetti (1763–1846) and Giovanni Bottesini (1821–1889) established a tradition for playing the instrument that was carried on in the 20th and 21st century with a number of double bass players.

Some of the most influential contemporary classical double bass players are known as much for their contributions to pedagogy as for their performing skills, such as US bassist Oscar Zimmerman (1910–1987), known for his teaching at the Eastman School of Music and, for 44 summers at the Interlochen Music Camp in Michigan and French-Syrian bassist François Rabbath (born 1931), who developed a new bass method which divided the entire fingerboard into six positions. Bassists noted for their virtuoso solo skills include US player Gary Karr (born 1941) and Finnish bassist-composer Teppo Hauta-aho (1941–2021).

This is a list of notable professional classical double bass players, including orchestral performers, soloists, chamber musicians, and teachers.

== Historical ==
- Johannes Matthias Sperger (1750–1812) composer
- Domenico Dragonetti (1763–1846) composer, conductor
- Giovanni Bottesini (1821–1889) composer, conductor
- Franz Simandl (1840–1912) composer
- Édouard Nanny (1872–1943) composer
- Serge Koussevitzky (1874–1951) composer, conductor
- Ludvig Juht (1894–1957) composer
- Charles Henry Winterbottom (1866–1935), London Symphony Orchestra, 1904-33

== North America ==
- Nico Abondolo
- Edwin Barker
- Warren Benfield
- Jeff Bradetich
- Bruce Bransby
- Maximilian Dimoff
- Timothy Cobb
- David Currie
- Mark Dresser
- Paul Ellison
- Diana Gannett
- John Geggie
- Larry Gray
- Gary Karr
- Albert Laszlo
- Eugene Levinson
- Jane Little
- Salvatore Macchia
- Jeremy McCoy
- Linda McKnight
- Homer Mensch
- Edgar Meyer
- Mark Morton
- Orin O'Brien
- Donald Palma
- Scott Pingel
- Frank Proto
- Joel Quarrington
- Hal Robinson
- Stuart Sankey
- Karl E. H. Seigfried
- Peter Seymour
- Dennis Trembly
- Bertram Turetzky
- Frederick Zimmermann
- Oscar G. Zimmerman
- Monica Witni

== Europe ==
- Leon Bosch
- Uxía Martínez Botana
- Gavin Bryars
- Jurek Dybał
- Gerald Drucker
- Renaud Garcia-Fons
- Gareth Wood
- Heinz Karl Gruber
- Teppo Hauta-Aho
- Rinat Ibragimov
- Jorma Katrama
- Joëlle Léandre
- Uxía Martínez Botana
- Duncan McTier
- Chi-chi Nwanoku
- Števo RepkaŠtevo Repka
- Franco Petracchi
- François Rabbath
- Jean-Pierre Robert
- Edicson Ruiz
- Rodney Slatford
- Indi Stivín
- Ludwig Streicher
- Joris Vanvinckenroye
- Rainer Zepperitz

== South America ==
- Edicson Ruiz

== Asia ==
- Young-Hee Chan
- Mikyung Sung

== Australia ==
- Phoebe Russell

== See also ==
- List of jazz bassists, which includes both double bass and electric bass players
- List of double bassists in popular music, which covers blues, folk, and other styles
