= Linda McKnight =

American bassist and educator

Linda McKnight is a double bassist particularly known for her teaching and solo performances. She is part of the music faculties at Manhattan School of Music, Columbia University, New York University, Columbia Teachers College, and Montclair State University.

== Career ==
McKnight earned her bachelor of music degree from The Juilliard School under Frederick Zimmermann and pursued additional studies with Stuart Sankey, Joseph Cascelli, Warren Benfield, Henry Portnoi, and Homer Mensch. She is a member of the Colonial Symphony of New Jersey and has appeared in chamber groups in Michigan, Iowa, and Indiana during conventions of the International Society of Bassists. Her summer teaching has included the New Jersey Summer Conference for String Education and Chamber Music (formerly NJ-ASTA Summer Conference), Manhattan School of Music Summer Music Camp, and the Oklahoma Summer Arts Institute.

McKnight has been a featured guest artist at workshops and clinics from Maine to Texas, addressing groups of parents, educators, and students on the contrabass and music education. In 1986 she was honored with the NJ-ASTA (American String Teachers Association) Distinguished Service Award for her seven-year term as NJ-ASTA president from 1979 through 1986. Her writings have appeared in String Tones, Tempo, American String Teacher, and International Society of Bassists magazines, and she is the editor of Paul Ramsier’s Pieces for Friends, published by Boosey & Hawkes. McKnight has recorded for the Swedish record label BIS. She is currently on the board of directors for the International Society of Bassists.
