= Sébastien Dubé =

Canadian upright bassist

- Born: 3 September 1966 (age 58); Québec
- Origin: Canada
- Genres: Jazz, Traditional folk music Classical music
- Occupation(s): Musician, composer
- Instrument(s): Upright bass, vocals
- Website: www.aurorachambermusic.com/artists/dubee-2

Sébastien Dubé (born 3 September 1966 in Québec, Canada) is an upright bassist known from several international classical orchestras and jazz ensembles.

== Career ==
After picking up the upright bass, Dubé attended musical studies at the Conservatoire du Québec, where he graduated with a Dîplome d’études supérieures, continuing at Rice University (Houston, Texas) and then for two years at the University of Southern California, where he earned his master's degree. He studied both jazz and classical music, with the principal teachers Luc Sévigny, Paul Ellison, Dennis Trembly, John Clayton and Edwin Barker.

When he had completed musical studies Dubé worked as a freelance musician in North America for two years with different orchestras like the Los Angeles Philharmonic, Houston Symphony, and the Orchestre Symphonique de Québec, before moving to Scandinavia. He was Assistant Principal Double Bass at the Bergen Philharmonic Orchestra (1993-1996), and Principal Bass of Norrlands Opera (1996-2000). In 2000 he took up the position of Principal Bass of the Swedish Chamber Orchestra. He has also appeared as a soloist with some of these orchestras. He has worked with different types of music, mostly jazz, folk music and of course classical, parallel to his orchestra career through the years. He plays in the jazz ensembles the Ivar Kolve Trio, Jonas Knutson Quartet, and in the duo Maria Johanson and Sébastien Dubé (bass and vocal), among others. His folk music partners include the Ale Möller Band, Duo Nyckelharpa and Bass (Torbjörn Näsbom), Harv, among others. In addition to this he organises concerts mixing different types of music and musicians together, including world music, jazz, folk or classical and sometimes even with symphony orchestras. Dubé has taught at the Domaine Forget Summer Festival in Québec, is a coach for the Baltic Youth Philharmonic and also holds a positions on the faculties at University of Örebro and Ingesund Högskola.

== Discography ==
With Harv

- 2002: Töst! (Drone Music)

With Ale Möller Band

- 2004: Bodjal (Amigo Records)

With Ivar Kolve Trio

- 2008: View From My Room (Curling Legs)

With Mats Norrefalk

- 2010: Once Upon A Time (Carpe Diem)

With Magnus Stinnerbom and Sophia Stinnerbom

- 2012: Beardo (Outhouse Records)

With Beast Within

- 2014: Adversity/Servitude (Sepulchral Productions)
