= Bransby (name) =

Bransby is both a given name and a surname. Notable people with the name include:

Given name:

- Bransby Cooper (1844–1914), Australian cricketer
- Bransby Key (1838–1901), South African Anglican bishop
- Bransby Williams (1870–1961), British actor, comedian and monologist
- Eric Bransby Williams (1900–1994), British actor

Surname:

- Bruce Bransby, American double-bassist
- Eric Bransby (1916–2020), American artist
- James Hews Bransby (1783–1847), English Unitarian minister
- Lawrence Bransby (born 1951), South African writer
