= Nigrin =

Nigrin is a surname. Notable people with the surname include:

- Georgius Nigrinus (Czech: Jiří Nigrin, died 1606), printer from Prague
- Albert Gabriel Nigrin, American cinema studies lecturer
- Michael Benjamin Nigrin, Canadian musician and composer

== See also ==
- Nigrine
- Streptonigrin, also called nigrin
