= Uxía Martínez Botana =

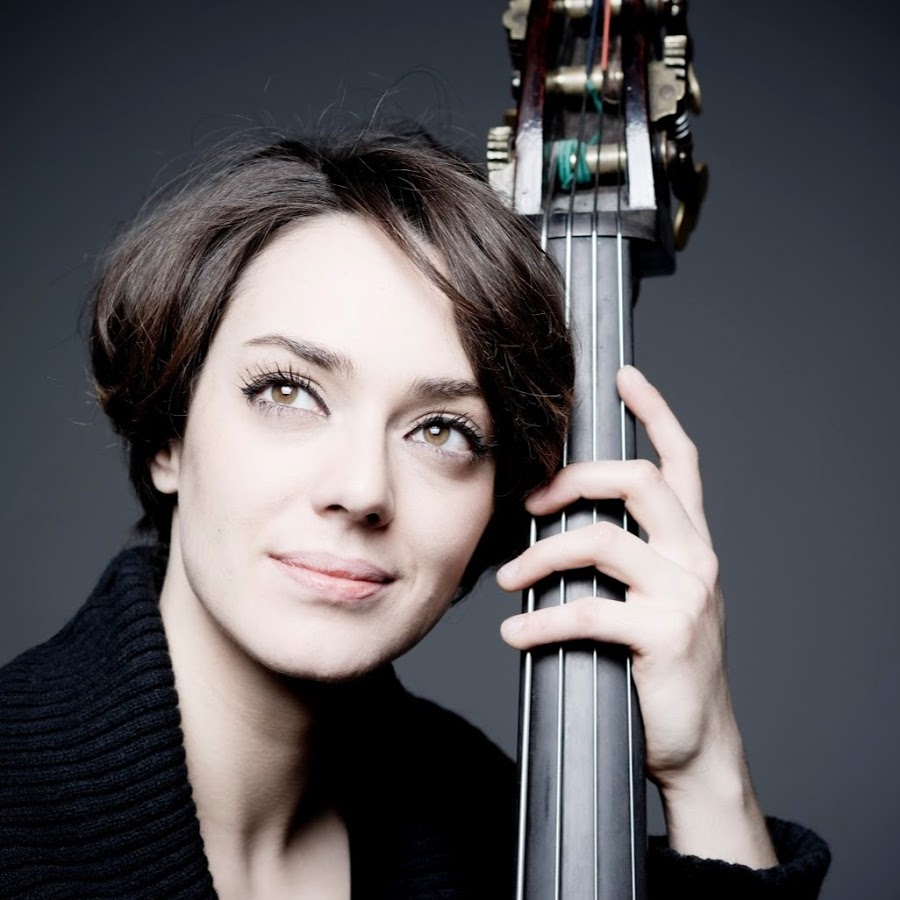

Background information
- Born: 7 August 1988 (age 38)
- Genres: Classical
- Instrument: Double bass
- Education: Conservatorium van Amsterdam

Uxía Martínez Botana (born in La Coruña, 7 August 1988) is a Spanish double bass player.

== Early life and education ==
Martínez Botana began learning the double bass and piano at the age of 6 at the elementary music conservatory Cristóbal Halffter in Ponferrada, Spain. Her first double bass teacher was Witold Patsevich – Principal Bass player from the Moscow Virtuosi orchestra – and studied piano with his wife, pianist Tatiana Patsevich. As Martínez Botana admits, Patsevich has been her biggest influence in creating her own sound and music individuality.

At the age of 12 she moved to A Coruña, Galicia, Spain, where she continued her studies at Youth Orchestra of Sinfónica de Galicia. At 18 she moved to Amsterdam, Netherlands, where she finished her bachelor and master studies at the Conservatorium van Amsterdam.

Her teachers included Edicson Ruiz, double-bassist with the Berlin Philharmonic; Janne Saksala, principal double bass at the Berlin Philharmonic; and Peter Stotijn, the former principal bass player of the Hague Residentie Orchestra.

== Career ==
=== Orchestral performance ===
Uxia Martinez Botana is the former Principal Double Bass of the Brussels Philharmonic. As a part of this orchestra Martinez Botana recorded three CDs in 2017 and 2018: the CHOC-winning Deutsche Grammophon Prokofiev: Romantic Suites (Romeo and Juliet, Cinderella) with conductor Stéphane Denève, the Warner Classics Piazzolla / Galliano: Concertos for Badoneon & Accordion with conductor Diego Matheuz and accordionist Gwen Cresens and the ERATO Cinema recorded by violinist Renaud Capuçon and the Brussels Philharmonic under the baton of Stéphane Denève. She has also been guest principal double bass at the Philharmonie Zuid-Nederland, Scottish Chamber Orchestra, Oxford Philharmonic Orchestra, Royal Scottish National Orchestra, Antwerp Symphony Orchestra and Orchestre d'Auvergne.

In 2012 Martinez Botana was the first Spanish bass player invited principal double bass of the Grammy Award winner Kremerata Baltica under the direction of Gidon Kremer, working with soloists such as Martha Argerich, Emmanuel Pahud, Khatia Buniatishvili, Daniel Barenboim, Mario Brunello, Mikhail Pletnev.

Since January 2016 she has been a Principal Double Bass of the Zürich based Weinberger Kammerorchester under the direction of Gábor Takács-Nagy.

In February 2022 in Müpa Budapest, Southbank Centre London, Auditorium of Lyon she joined the Budapest Festival Orchestra under the direction of Ivan Fischer with violinist Patricia Kopatchinskaja performing the stravinsky violin concerto and the Rite of the spring by Igor Stravinsky.

=== Chamber and solo performance ===
As a chamber musician Martínez Botana performed with prominent artists including Julia Fischer, Ana Chumachenko, Yuri Bashmet, Natalia Gutman, Andras Schiff, Christian Tetzlaff, Lars Vogt, Nobuko Imai, Tabea Zimmermann, Polina Leschenko, Philippe Graffin, Gary Hoffman, David Cohen, Kian Soltani, Aaron Pilsan, Antje Weithaas, Alexander Buzlov, Mischa Maisky and Tatiana Masurenko. Among others, she took part in the Tango Factory project with Marcello Nisinman (bandoneon) and Frans Helmerson (cello). Also, she collaborated as Principal Double Bass with British conductor Simon Rattle performing the Metamorphosen by Richard Strauss in the Kronberg Academy.

In 2014 Martínez Botana founded the Rubik Ensemble along with the international team of five young soloists: Nikita Boriso-Glebsky (violin), Solenne Paidassi (violin), David Cohen (cello), Dana Zemtsov (viola) and Andreas Hering (piano). Performing on different stages since that time, the Rubik Ensemble has gained positive feedback from audiences and press. The ensemble is named after Rubik's Cube.

In 2015 specially commissioned by the Kronbeg academy for all alumni with Gidon Kremer, Martinez Botana participated in the premiere of "Swan Time" written by Victor Kissine. Together with other artists such as Tanja Becker-Bender, Andrej Bielow, Marc Bouchkov, Friedemann Eichhorn, Suyoen Kim, Alissa Margulis, Alicja Smietana, Kirill Troussov.

In 2019 Martínez Botana debuted at the Gstaad Menuhin Festival & Academy with Alina Ibragimova (violin), Charlotte Saluste-Bridoux (violin), Lawrence Power (viola), Sol Gabetta (cello), Bertrand Chamayou (piano).

Some of her most notable Solo appearances includes the premiere of works by composer Vladimir Rosinskij (born 1962) at the "Two Days and Two Nights of New Music" festival in Odesa, Ukraine. In 2010 her interpretation of the Parable XVII by Vincent Persichetti was selected by American double bass magazine No Treble as one of the top 10 worldwide interpretations.

In February 2017 she presented Rosinskij's works with the Orquesta Sinfónica de Galicia under the baton of Dima Slobodeniouk. Martínez Botana was also giving solo concerts in Luxembourg, Netherlands, Belgium and Spain.

In April 2019 Uxia Martínez had her solo debut with the Czech Philharmonic. The programme included Giovanni Bottesini's Gran Duo Concertante for violin and double bass.

In August, 2019 she performed the same piece by Bottesini with Josef Špaček as a violinist and the Franz Liszt Chamber Orchestra under Robert Farkas.

In December 2019 she offer a solo recital for the King Philippe of Belgium and the Queen Queen Mathilde of Belgium at the Belgium Royal Palace

In May 2020, due to the quarantine of the COVID-19 pandemic, together with the violinist Niklas Liepe's "The new Paganini project" playing a Fazil Say composition from Amsterdam. The performance has been recorded and published in July 2020 by Sony Classical.

In 2021 offered a recital for the Queen Letizia Of Spain and the King Philip VI of Spain at the ceremony of the Prizes from Fundacion Princesa de Girona together with violinist Leticia Moreno.

=== Teaching ===
Since 2018 she is double bass professor in Barcelona at the Catalonia College of Music.

Since 2020 she is double bass professor in Barenboim–Said Akademie

=== Instrument ===
In February 2016 Martínez Botana received sponsorship from the National Dutch Musical Instrument Foundation. The foundation loaned her the double bass "English Lady" (c. 1800) from the Willem Vogelaar collection. Martínez Botana also plays the "Ludwig Neuner" (1854) double bass loaned by a private sponsor.

=== Repertoire ===
Martínez Botana's repertoire embraces music of different countries, genres and epochs. She performs compositions by Giovanni Battista degli Antonii, Domenico Gabrielli, Georg Philipp Telemann, Johann Sebastian Bach, Johann Baptist Wanhal, Franz Anton Hoffmeister, Niccolò Paganini, Ludwig van Beethoven, Giovanni Bottesini, Gioachino Rossini, César Franck, Johannes Brahms, Adolf Mišek, Max Bruch, Gabriel Fauré, Sergei Rachmaninoff, Enrique Granados, Paul Hindemith, Hans Fryba, Erwin Schulhoff, Vincent Persichetti, Mieczysław Weinberg, Virgilio Mortari, Serge Koussevitzky, Astor Piazzolla, Michel van der Aa, Edgar Meyer, Nino Rota, Hans Werner Henze, Sofia Gubaidulina, Frank Proto, Pēteris Vasks, David Ellis, Teppo Hauta-aho and Emil Tabakov. In December 2011 the video of her interpretation of the Parable XVII by Vincent Persichetti was chosen by the American bass magazine No Treble for its Top Ten most-read features of the week.

=== Soundtracks ===
Martínez Botana's interest in film music led her to collaborations with the Netherlands Film Festival. She participated in recording soundtracks to a number of films including No estoy muerto, solo estoy dormido (I am not dead, I am just asleep).

As a part of the Brussels Philharmonic she has participated in recording of many soundtracks including the Oscar award-winning soundtrack of the film The Artist by Ludovic Bource.

=== Achievements ===
- 2012 – Artist of the Year selected by the national music magazine Muzika, Kyiv, Ukraine
- 2014 – Gustav Mahler scholarship provided by the Claudio Abbado Foundation, Bolzano, Italy
- 2015 – Sponsored artist of the Pirastro brand, a string manufacturer in Offenbach am Main, Germany
- For the concert season 2015/2016, Martínez Botana was selected as the artistic image of the TivoliVredenburg in Utrecht.
- 2016 – Botana was featured in the Japanese music magazine The Walker's, including a photo on the title page.
- 2017 – She is included in The Honorific Yearbook from the Arts Department of the University of Florence, Italy, as one of the most important double bass players of the millennium.
- 2018 – Docent at the Catalonia College of Music (ESMUC) in Barcelona, Spain.

=== Reviews ===
- "Ibragimova is joined by violist Lawrence Power, cellist Sol Gabetta, the irresistibly charismatic double bassist Uxía Martínez Botana and pianist Bertrand Chamayou – a lineup as classy as they come. The playing is fleet-fingered and superbly polished, details of Schubert's score as clear as that fabled Swiss mountain air" - The Guardian
- "The best performer of the night was undoubtedly Spanish double bass player Uxia Martinez Botana. She is principal double-bassist at the Brussels Philharmonic and played passionately and confidently throughout the evening. Overall, the night was undoubtedly dominated by excellence" - Saffron Walden Reporter
- "Uxía plays bass with such elegance and agility that she reminds me more a violinist rather than a bass player." – Ivry Gitlis
- "The amount of control she shows over her instrument is astonishing while the emotion she pours into it is breathtaking, and for that we say bravo!" – No Treble magazine
- "The energetic musician – inexhaustible as well as positive – Martínez Botana has been at the top of the best double bass performers for long time." – Codalario.com
- "In the double bass of a superb Uxía Martínez Botana, Vladimir Rosinskij ventures into a (scarce, on the other hand) search for other timbrels." – Mundoclasico.com about the 2017 premiere of Vladimir Rosinskij's Concerto Misterio performed by the Orquesta Sinfónica de Galicia with conductor Dima Slobodeniouk

== Charitable activity ==
Very committed to the fight against cancer, she collaborates closely through her music with associations working in that field.
