= Irene Abrigo =

Italian violinist

- Born: 3 December 1988 (age 37); Turin, Italy
- Education: HEM Haute Ecole de Musique de Genève; HEMU Haute Ecole de Musique de Lausanne; Mozarteum Salzburg; HKB Hoschule der Künste Bern; with; Marie-Annick Nicolas; Pierre Amoyal; Corina Belcea
- Occupations: Concert Violinist; Violin Teacher; Artistic Director
- Years active: 2007 - present
- Organizations: Lucignano Music Festival; POURQUOIPAS no-profit; Italia Swiss Music Society
- Style: Classical
- Awards: 2014 Finalist Concorso Biennale di Violino di Vittorio Veneto; 2015 Respighi Prize
- Website: www.ireneabrigo.com

Irene Abrigo (born 3 December 1988) is an Italian classical violinist.

== Education ==
Abrigo started the violin at age 4 at the Aosta Suzuki School with Adriano Coluccio. At age 10 she continued her studies with Fabrizio Pavone and graduated at the Turin Conservatory at age 19. She moved then in Switzerland to study at the HEM Haute Ecole de Musique de Genève in the class of Marie-Annick Nicolas where she had her Master of Performance (2009–2011). She continued her studies with Pierre Amoyal in the HEMU Haute Ecole de Musique de Lausanne and Mozarteum Salzburg (2012–2014). She obtained the Pedagogy Master at the HKB Hoschule der Künste Bern in the class of Corina Belcea (2016–2018).

Graduated at Liceo Classico "XXIV February" in Aosta, she had in 2015 the Degree in Art, Literature and Performance (DAMS) at the University of Turin with a thesis about Niccolò Paganini.

== Competitions and scholarships ==
Abrigo has won over 10 National and International Music Prizes, and was Finalist laureate of the Italian National Violin Competition 2014 "Città di Vittorio Veneto" .

- 2015: Respighi Prize – New York (USA)
- 2014: 1st Prize – International Competition "Città di Collegno" - Premio A. Peyretti (IT)
- 2014: 2nd Prize – 36° European Competition Violin & Orchestra (IT)
- 2014: 1st Prize – 36° European Competition Solo Strings Category (IT)
- 2014: 2nd Prize – 36° European Competition Chamber Music (IT)
- 2014: Laureate (finalist) – Concorso Biennale "Città di Vittorio Veneto" (IT)
- 2014: 1st Prize – International Competition "Nervi" (IT)
- 2014: 2nd Prize – International Competition "The Night in Madrid" (ES)
- 2013: Scholarship "Fondation Butticaz" (CH)
- 2011: Scholarship Master dei Talenti Orchestrali CRT (IT)
- 2011: Scholarship Master dei Talenti Orchestrali CRT (IT)
- 2010: Scholarship Master dei Talenti Musicali CRT (IT)
- 2005: 1st Prize – International Competition "Città di Varazze" (IT)
- 2004: 2nd Prize – International Competition "Giovani Talenti" (IT)
- 2003: 2nd Prize – International Competition "Città di Racconigi" (IT)

== Contemporary Music & Premieres ==
Winning the 2015 Respighi Prize, Abrigo made her Carnegie Hall debut in 2016 with the Chamber Orchestra of New York, performing the NY première of the violin concerto by Dirk Brossé "Black, White and in Between". In 2016 she also performed in Brazil the South America Premiere of the Respighi's Violin Concerto No.1 and she had her debut with the West Czech Symphony Orchestra in the Czech Republic, with the Mozart Violin Concerto No.5. She collaborates with important Swiss living composers such as Heinz Holliger, Richard Dubugnon, David Philip Hefti, Daniel Schnyder, Nadir Vassena.

- 2022 Wasser by Ursina Maria Braun for two violins, viola and two cellos - Pfingstfestival Schloss Brunegg
- 2021 Acque perse by Nadir Vassena for Soprano and string quartet - Pfingstfestival Schloss Brunegg
- 2020 BBBB by Daniel Schnyder for saxophone and string trio - Pfingstfestival Schloss Brunegg
- 2019 Infal's Songs for solo violin by Antonmario Semolini (dedicated to her) – Pfingstfestival Schloss Brunegg, Switzerland
- 2018: De Umbris II for Flute and String Trio by Xavier Dayer – with Felix Renggli (Flute), Jürg Dähler (viola) and Daniel Haefliger (cello) – Swiss Chamber Concerts, Switzerland
- 2017: Andante Mesto by Federico Mantovani – with Diego Mingolla (piano) – Festival Paganiniano, Italy
- 2017: Trans-It Piano Quartet by Richard Dubugnon – with Dénes Várjon (piano), Jürg Dähler (viola) and Thomas Grossenbacher (cello) – Pfingstfestival Schloss Brunegg, Switzerland]
- 2016: Black, White and in Between by Dirk Brossé – with the Chamber Orchestra of New York – Carnegie Hall, NY, USA
- 2016: Violin Concerto No.1 by Ottorino Respighi – with the Orchestra del Festival Musica Nas Montanhas and M°Jean Reis – Poços de Caldas, MR, Brazil

Irene Abrigo collaborated with Italian composer Ezio Bosso. First met in 2007, she toured as concertmaster of his Ensemble Buxus Consort and performed in piano trio with cellist Relja Lukic and Bosso at the piano. In December 2025, she appeared on the Rai 3 television programme Via Dei Matti n.0, alongside Stefano Bollani and Alessio Bertallot, to present a crossover project dedicated to Bosso.

== Historical performance ==
Alongside her commitment to contemporary music, Abrigo is also engaged in historically informed performance practice, regularly taking lessons with the conductor and violinist Enrico Onofri and performing on a rare Baroque violin by Jacobus Stainer.

== Social engagement & Artistic Director ==
Abrigo is the artistic director of POURQUOIPAS, a non-profit association organizing concerts, masterclasses and projects with social commitments, which she founded in 2015 with the Swiss violinist Madeleine-Murray-Robertson. With POURQUOIPAS she created in 2017 for Pully Sound Sound Festival an educational experience titled "Niccolò Paganini: the mystery": a one-hour itinerary discovering truth and mysteries of the composer's life, that ended with a final concert.

In February 2021 POURQUOIPAS launched the crowdfunding campaign in support of the violinist Corinne Chapelle, affected by a rare form of cancer. The campaign raised +200.000 Euro in three weeks, involving dozen of Classical Music Stars (Nicola Benedetti, Renaud Capucon, Vilde Frang, Steven Isserlis, Igudesman and Joo, Corina Belcea..) and many International Newspaper, Radio and Media (The Times, Radio France, Le Figaro, The Strad, The Violin Channel...). Tragically, Corinne Chapelle died five weeks later, after an intensive care in Germany.

Abrigo launched in July 2021 the Lucignano Music Festival, a chamber music festival in Tuscany, Italy.

In 2023 Irene launched the ITALIAN SWISS MUSIC SOCIETY in collaboration with the Institute of Culture and Consulate of Italy in Zürich, a new concert serie celebrating the Italian excellence in Switzerland and promoting an artistic exchange between the two cultures.

== Discography ==
Abrigo appears in the following CDs:

- 2020 : Swiss Chamber Soloists "Xavier Dayer", Claves Records / CD 3007. With Heinz Holliger, oboe - Felix Renggli, flute - Irene Abrigo, violin - Daria Zappa, violin - Jürg Dähler, viola - Daniel Haefliger, cello
- 2021 : Swiss Chamber Soloists "Elliott Carter", Genuin / GEN 21731. With Sarah Wegener, Felix Renggli, Heinz Holliger, François Benda, Sergio Pires, Olivier Darbellay, Diego Chenna, Irene Abrigo, Jürg Dähler, Daniel Haefliger, Peter Solomon.
- 2021 : "LE CARNAVAL DES ANIMAUX", Claves Records/ CD 3047. With Roberto González-Monjas & Irene Abrigo, violin - Jürg Dähler, viola - Cäcilia Chmel, cello - Klavier Duo: Lilija Poskute und Tomas Daukantas - Nolwenn Bargin, flute - Sergio Pires, clarinet - Norbert Uhl, xylophon - Kristof Zambo, kontrabass - Matthias Würsch, glassharmonica - Kurt Aeschbacher, erzähler

== Mentors ==
Abrigo has maintained close relationships with important musical figures who have played a significant role in her artistic development, including Heinz Holliger, Jürg Dähler, Corina Belcea and Enrico Onofri.

== Instruments and bows ==
Between 2016 and 2018 Abrigo performed on a violin by Gaetano Antoniazzi and occasionally on a Guarneri del Gesù and Antonio Stradivari.

Since June 2018 Abrigo plays a violin by Giovanni Battista Guadagnini, Milan 1758, on loan to her from a private collector.

She plays on bows by F.X. Tourte (ex-Iona Brown), Nicolas Maline, Jean-Jacque Millant and Arnaud Suard.

== Private life ==
Abrigo is married and living in Switzerland since 2012. In 2023 Irene received the Swiss citizenship.

Abrigo has been a vegan for 10 years (2008–2018).
