= Frederick Zimmermann =

American double bassist (1906–1967)

- Born: May 18, 1906; New York City, New York, U.S.
- Died: August 3, 1967 (aged 61); Ohlstadt, West Germany

Academic work
- Discipline: Music
- Sub-discipline: Double bass
- Institutions: New York Philharmonic; Juilliard School; Mannes School of Music; Manhattan School of Music; New York University

Frederick Zimmermann (May 18, 1906 – August 3, 1967) was an American double bassist and teacher. He played in the New York Philharmonic from 1930 to 1966 and taught at the Juilliard School, Mannes School of Music, Columbia University, Manhattan School of Music, and New York University. He was an influential double bass teacher in the 20th century. In his "A New History of the Double Bass", Paul Brun describes Zimmermann as the "father of bass teaching in the United States".

== Early life ==
Zimmermann was born on May 18, 1906, in New York City. He studied the double bass with Herman Reinshagen, the principal bass of the New York Philharmonic under Gustav Mahler and Arturo Toscanini.

== Career ==
He made numerous transcriptions of music ranging from the 14th to 20th century. In 1966 his book, Contemporary Concept of Bowing Technique for the Double Bass was published. In addition to music, Zimmermann studied painting with George Grosz at the Art Students' League, had three showings, and often lectured on modern German painters. Zimmermann married his wife Dorothy in 1931. They had one son Edwin. Zimmermann died of a brain tumor at age 61 on August 3, 1967, while visiting Ohlstadt, Germany.

His students have occupied posts in virtually every major American orchestra. Some of his notable students include David Walter, Orin O'Brien, Donald Palma, Linda McKnight, Stuart Sankey, Frank Proto, Charles Mingus, Henry Grimes, Lucille Dixon, Eddie Gómez, and Red Mitchell.

== Death ==
Zimmermann died on August 3, 1967, while visiting Ohlstadt, Germany.
