= Pierre Robert =

Pierre Robert may refer to:

- Pierre Robert (composer) (ca. 1618–1699), French composer
- Pierre Robert (radio personality) (1955–2025), radio disc jockey in Philadelphia
- Pierre-François-Joseph Robert (1763–1826), French lawyer, politician and professor of public law
- Jean-Pierre Robert (born 1956), French double bass player and author

== See also ==
- Robert Pierre (disambiguation)
