= Paul Ellison (bassist) =

American classical musician (born 1941)

Paul Ellison (born October 17, 1941) is an American double bassist and pedagogue. He has been teaching at Rice University in Houston, Texas USA since 1974 and is the Lynette B. Autry Professor of Double Bass at Rice University's Shepherd School of Music, where he also serves as co-chair of the string department. He is faculty emeritus of the USC Thornton School of Music, where he was also chair of the string department, and of The Colburn School in Los Angeles, California, and is a past president of the International Society of Bassists.

Mr. Ellison was a member of the double bass section of the Houston Symphony Orchestra for 23 years (17 as principal), beginning in 1966 under the baton of Sir John Barbirolli and continuing during the years when the orchestra hosted such notables as Aaron Copland, Leonard Bernstein, Henry Mancini, and Jascha Heifetz. Ellison was the first principal double bassist of the Houston Grand Opera orchestra (with whom he continues to perform), performing in the company's premiers of Nixon In China by John Adams and Akhnaten by Philip Glass. Mr. Ellison's degrees include a B.M.E. (1965) from Eastern New Mexico University and a M.M. (1966) from Northwestern University. He was the first formal pupil of bassist François Rabbath and holds the first Diploma and Teaching Certificate awarded by the Institut Rabbath in Paris. He is a regular guest lecturer at the Royal College of Music, London, the Yehudi Menuhin School (UK) and USC Thornton School of Music.

Mr. Ellison has served as principal double bass of the Grand Teton Music Festival in Jackson Hole, Wyoming, principal double bass of the Santa Fe Opera, performer/faculty at the Aspen Music Festival and Sarasota Music Festival, and was instrumental in the development of the double bass program, as well as teaching for some 40 summers, at the Academie Domaine Forget in Québec, Canada. His many former students hold performing and teaching positions across the US, Canada, Europe, Australia, New Zealand, and Asia. He is married to American double bassist Elisabeth Ellison.

== Notable students and associates ==
- Francois Rabbath
- John Clayton
- Peter Seymour
- Scott Dixon
- Sébastien Dubé
- Hal Robinson
