= Anton Torello =

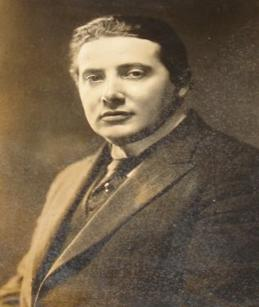
- Anton Torello

Background information
- Born: June 30, 1884; Sant Sadurní d'Anoia, Spain
- Died: October 20, 1959 Los Angeles, California
- Genre: Classical music
- Occupation: Double-bassist
- Instrument: Double bass
- Years active: 1909–1959

Anton Torello (Catalan: Antoni Torelló i Ros, 30 June 1884, Sant Sadurní d'Anoia – 20 October 1959, Los Angeles) was a Catalan double bass player. He was principal bass of the Philadelphia Orchestra from 1914 until 1948, and was the first bass professor at Philadelphia's Curtis Institute of Music. He taught what became the Philadelphia school of double bass playing, strongly influencing American bass playing.

== Studies and early career ==
Torello began studying double bass with his father and his older brother Peter. Warren Benfield recalls this anecdote about Torello's early schooling in talking about experimental fingerings:

The late Anton Torello ... once said that when he was a student in Barcelona (his whole family were bass players) he wasn't given anything to eat until he knew his lesson. Sometimes he got very hungry. What he would do to learn etudes was to develop his fingerings. He would work out as many ways as possible to play a passage and learn them all. Then he would put his music away for a day or two, and when he tried all the fingerings again, one was usually clearly better than the others.

Torello's professional orchestral career began in 1897. His first solo concert followed the next year. By 22 he was already a professor at Conservatori Superior de Música del Liceu and principal in the orchestra in Liceu.

== Move to America, Philadelphia ==
In 1909, Torello moved to the United States of America. He found work first in New York and later as principal bass in an opera orchestra in Boston before being hired by Leopold Stokowski as principal bass of the Philadelphia Orchestra in 1914.

Torello had two sons, Carl and William, both double bassists who played in the Philadelphia Orchestra.

Torello remained as principal bass in Philadelphia until 1948. After retirement he moved to Los Angeles, where he continued to play with the resident orchestra of Paramount Pictures.

== Curtis, notable students ==
Philadelphia's Curtis Institute of Music was established in 1924. Torello joined the faculty as its first double bass professor in 1926. Part of his legacy was in introducing the over-handed style of bowing (French bow) to America. A number of Torello's students at Curtis went on to become important figures in double bass in America.

Notable students include:

- Oscar G. Zimmerman – principal bass Rochester Philharmonic, professor Eastman School of Music
- Warren Benfield – Chicago Symphony Orchestra, professor Northwestern and DePaul universities

== Performances ==
Torello performed solo recitals, chamber works and appeared as a soloist with the Philadelphia Orchestra on 27 and 28 February 1920, performing Lorenziti's concerto for viola d'amore and double bass with Thaddeus Rich.

In October 1920, Torello shared a recital with Metropolitan Opera bass José Mardones that received mention in The New York Times:

Mr. Torello is an accomplished virtuoso on his instrument. He uses a small-sized double bass with three strings, whose tone on the highest one approximates that of the 'cello. ... Mr. (Torello) played a Fantasy of his own, and pieces by Ghere, Koussevitzky, Valls, Franchi and Bottesini (arranged by himself)

In addition to this repertoire, Torello also performed with Mardones in Mozart's aria "Per questa bella mano".

Torello's use of his three stringed solo instrument was at a time when performance on three stringed instruments had mostly disappeared, most of these instruments having been converted into four string instruments.
