= Homer Mensch =

Classical bassist (1914–2005)

- Born: November 14, 1914; Sussex, New Jersey, U.S.
- Died: December 9, 2005 (aged 91); Manhattan, New York City, U.S.
- Education: Manhattan School of Music
- Occupations: Classical double bassist; music educator
- Employers: Pittsburgh Symphony Orchestra; New York Philharmonic; NBC Symphony Orchestra; Juilliard School; Manhattan School of Music; Yale University; Rutgers University
- Known for: Principal and assistant principal double bass positions; teaching at major American music schools

Homer Mensch (November 14, 1914, in Sussex, New Jersey – December 9, 2005, in Manhattan, New York) was a prominent classical bassist who was a former member of the Pittsburgh Symphony, the New York Philharmonic, the New York Pops, and the NBC Symphony. Mensch held faculty positions at Yale University, at the Manhattan School of Music (in both the college and pre-college divisions), the Juilliard School (also in both divisions), the Mannes College of Music, Rutgers University, Dalcroze School, Queens College, and Catholic University. He taught upwards of 45 students a week from beginners, to conservatory students, to professionals both in the classical and jazz fields.

== Career as a double bassist ==
Mensch studied bass with former New York Philharmonic principal bassist Anselme Fortier at the Manhattan School of Music. As a teenager, he played with the Dick Messner Big Band at the Hotel McAlpin in order to pay for his bass lessons. He was an excellent tennis player in his youth, and originally wanted to pursue a career in tennis. However, he was also a promising bassist and eventually chose music over tennis. "This was at the start of the Great Depression", he told the Juilliard Journal, "so pursuing a career in music was pretty risky. I was lucky that my parents didn't try to make me go into a field that was a safer bet."

Mensch joined the Pittsburgh Symphony in 1932 after winning the audition on the stage of Carnegie Hall in front of Otto Klemperer. He was assistant principal bass under Klemperer and Fritz Reiner until 1938. He then joined the New York Philharmonic under John Barbirolli. In 1943, Mensch left the philharmonic to serve in the U.S. Army in Texas, during which time he played bass in the U.S. Army Band.

In 1944, Mensch returned to New York as a freelance musician. He subsequently performed with the NBC Symphony under Arturo Toscanini and played in numerous television and radio shows. He recorded with Gregor Piatagorsky, Isaac Stern, Nathan Milstein, the Bach Aria Group, the Casals Festival Orchestra, the Columbia Symphony, and on every commercial recording made in New York. He also recorded with Frank Sinatra, Barbra Streisand, Paul McCartney, and numerous others. Mensch can also be heard on many soundtracks from the 1940s until the 1970s.

At the request of the New York Philharmonic's then-conductor, Leonard Bernstein, Mensch returned to the philharmonic in 1966. He remained until 1975, playing under Bernstein and Pierre Boulez. After leaving the philharmonic, he served as principal bass of the Mostly Mozart Festival Orchestra, the New York Chamber Symphony, the New York Choral Society, Little Orchestra Society, and the New York Pops.

Teaching career

Mensch joined the Juilliard faculty in 1970 and became the chair of the double bass department in 2002. He joined the Manhattan School of Music faculty in 1980 and received MSM's Presidential Medal for Distinguished Service in May 2005.

== Collaborations ==
With Tony Bennett

- I've Gotta Be Me (Columbia, 1969)

With Judy Collins

- Times of Our Lives (Elektra Records, 1982)

With Gloria Estefan

- Hold Me, Thrill Me, Kiss Me (Epic Records, 1994)
- Destiny (Epic Records, 1996)

With Michael Franks

- Passionfruit (Warner Bros. Records, 1983)

With Hope

- Hope (A&M Records, 1972)

With Jon Lucien

- Romantico (Zemajo, 1980)

With Nina Simone

- Baltimore (CTI, 1978)

With Frank Sinatra

- Trilogy: Past Present Future (Reprise, 1980)
- She Shot Me Down (Reprise, 1981)

With Cris Williamson

- Cris Williamson (Ampex Records, 1971)

== Notable students ==
- Nathaniel Ayers, homeless cellist, subject of the book and movie, The Soloist, was Mensch's double bass student while at Juilliard; Mensch was his mentor
- Mark Helias, composer
- Steve Kirby, jazz bassist
- Albert Laszlo, Juilliard School and University of Cincinnati – College-Conservatory of Music professor of double bass
- Christian McBride, jazz master
- Linda McKnight, Manhattan School of Music professor of double bass
- Michael Benjamin Nigrin, member of the Buffalo Philharmonic
- Donald Palma, Yale University professor of double bass
- Frank Tusa, jazz bassist
- Jean-Yves Benichou, Toulouse Chamber Orchestra, Strasbourg Philharmonic, Electric Jazz Bassist
- Kurt Muroki, Chamber Music Society of Lincoln Ctr, Indiana University Professor

== See also ==
- List of contemporary classical double bass players
- Juilliard School
- Manhattan School of Music
