= Bassist =

Musician who plays a bass instrument

Bassist
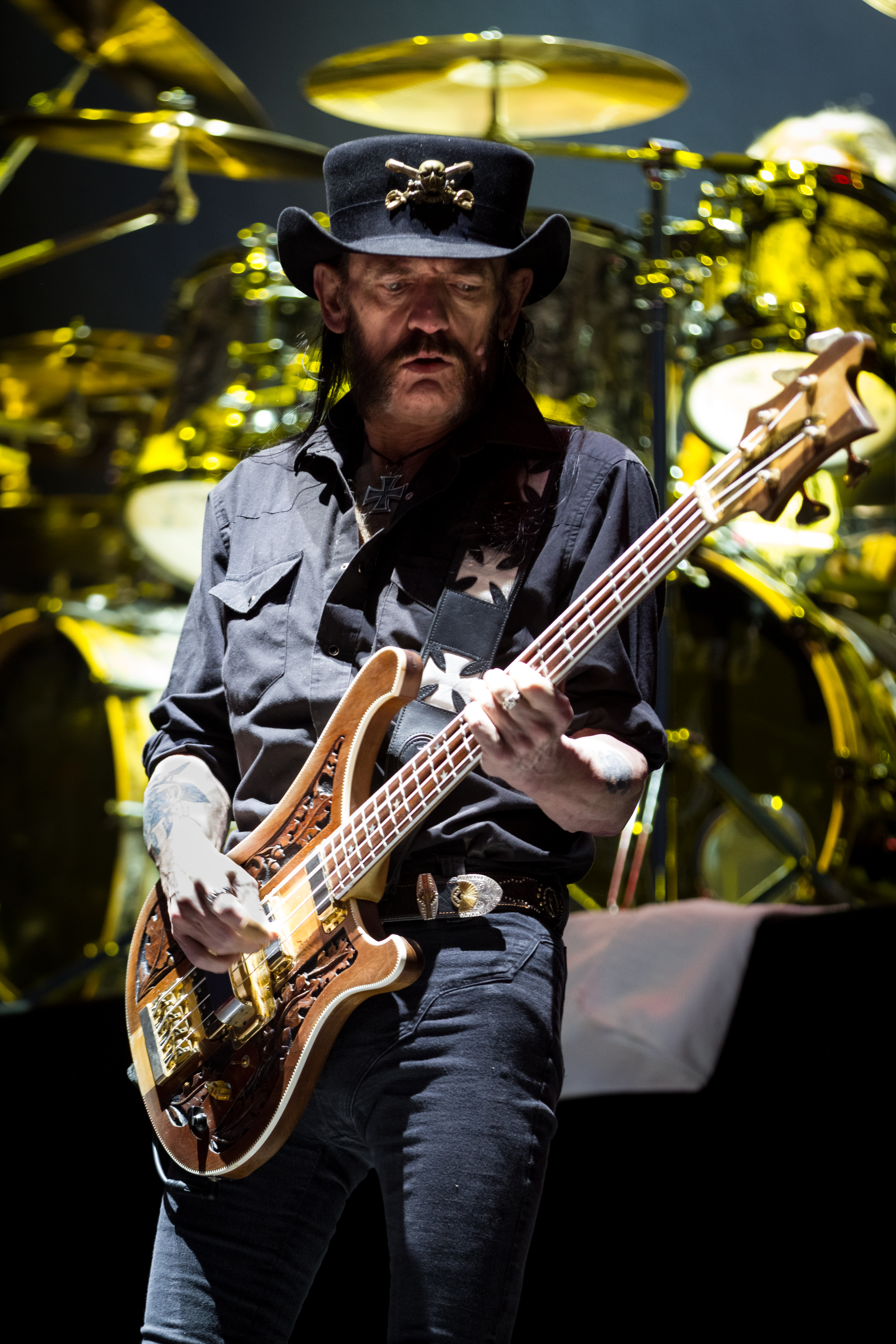
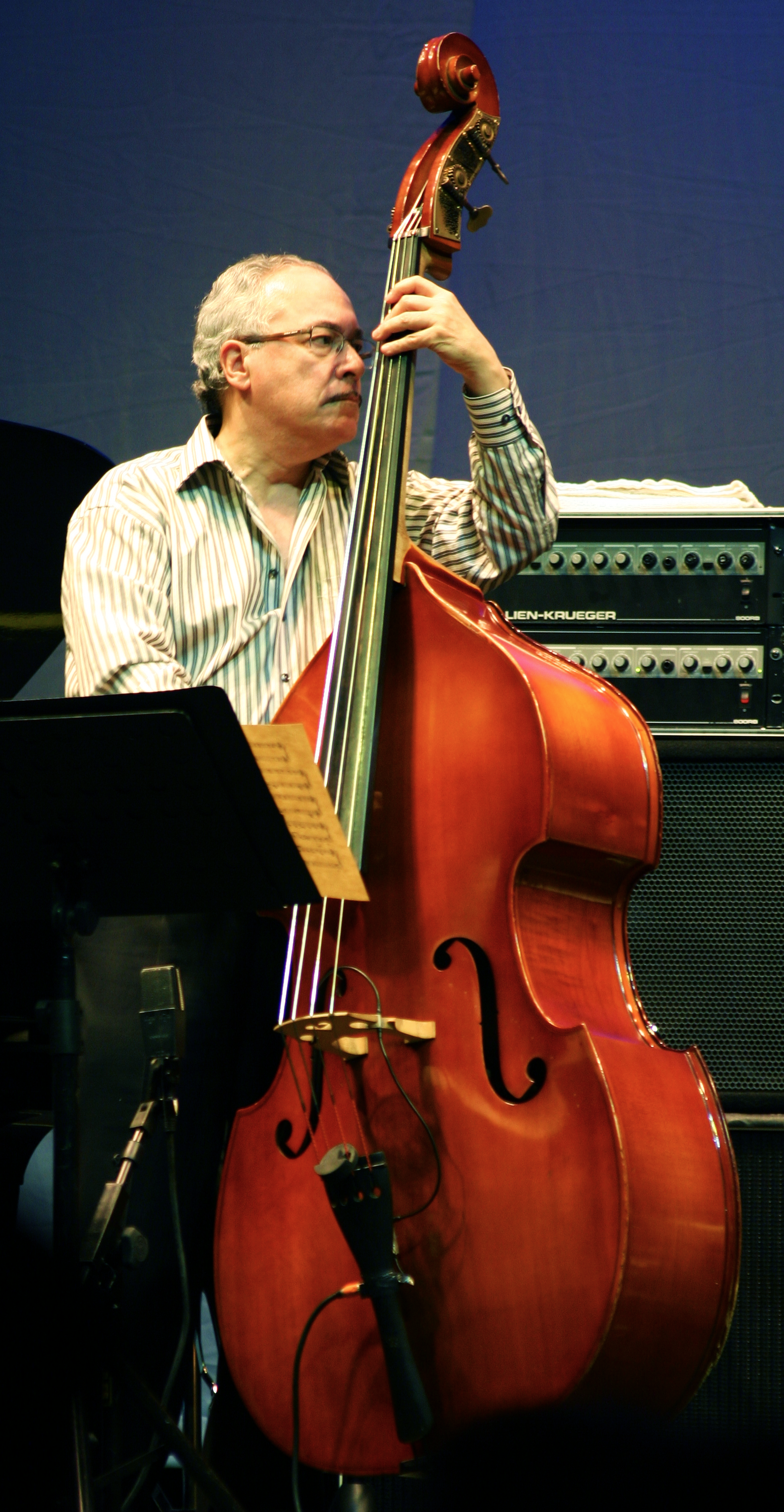
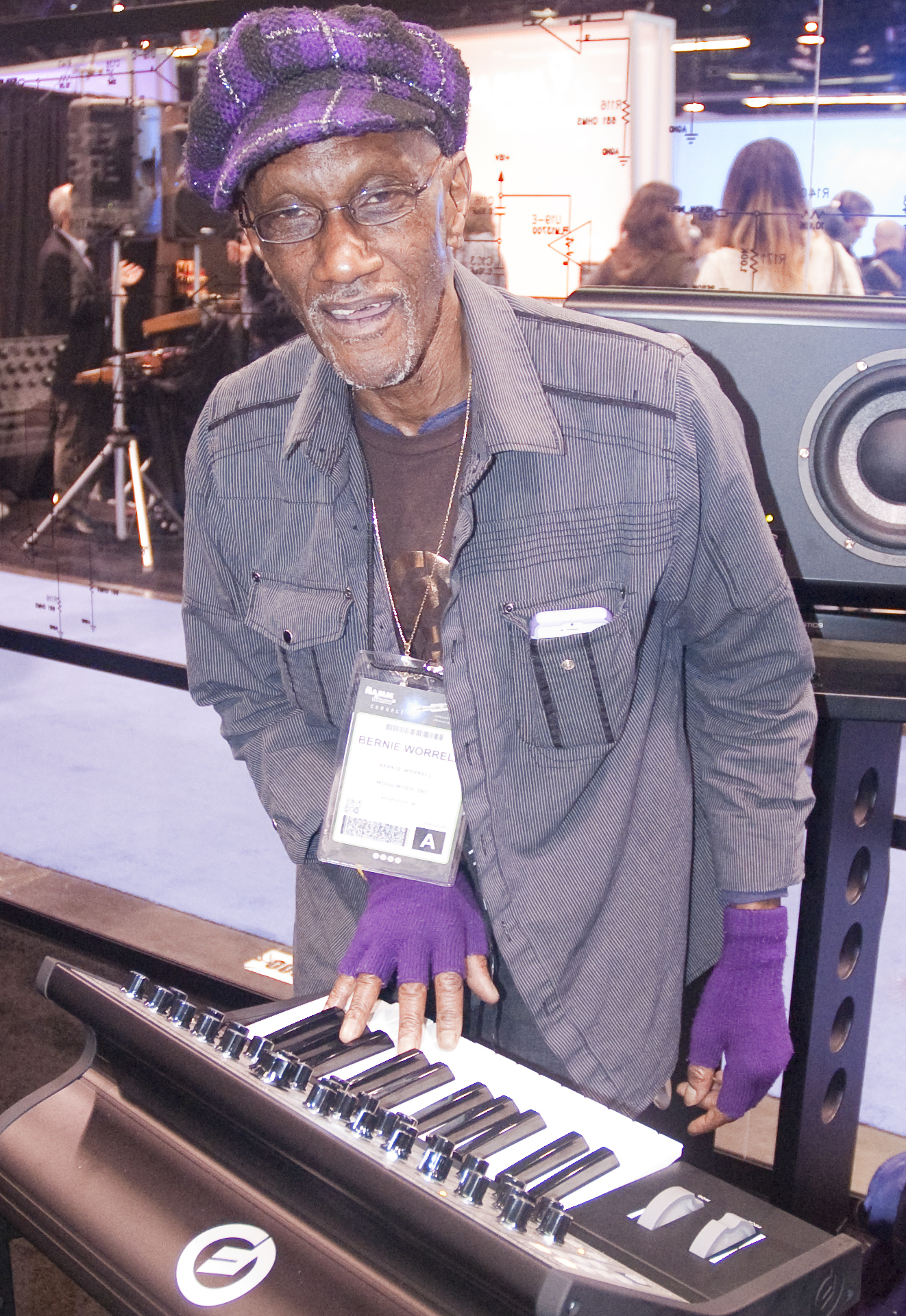
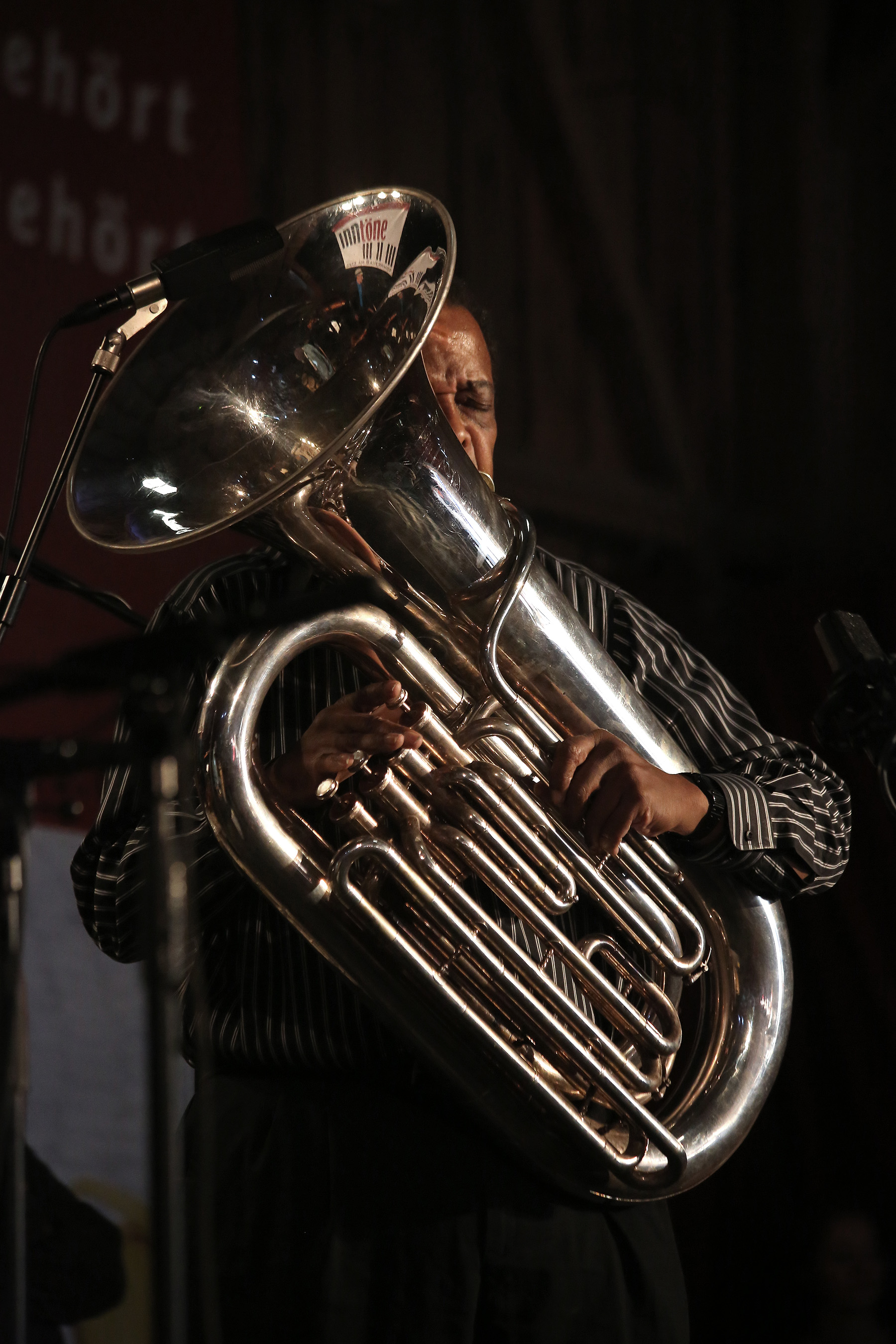
Clockwise from upper left: Lemmy Kilmister playing a Rickenbacker bass guitar, Eddie Gómez with an upright bass, Howard Johnson playing a tuba, and Bernie Worrell with a Moog Little Phatty synth

A bassist (also known as a bass player or bass guitarist) is a musician who plays a bass instrument, such as a double bass (upright bass, contrabass, wood bass), bass guitar (electric bass, acoustic bass), or keyboard bass (synth bass). Many musical genres tend to be associated with at least one or more of these instruments.

== Overview ==
Since the 1960s, the electric bass has been the standard bass instrument for funk, R&B, soul, rock, reggae, jazz fusion, heavy metal, country and pop. The double bass is the standard bass instrument for classical music, bluegrass, rockabilly, and most genres of jazz. Low brass instruments such as the tuba or sousaphone are the standard bass instrument in Dixieland and New Orleans-style jazz bands. Tuba players are sometimes classified with bassists, as the instrument was used to double a part for the double bass in early music recordings; tubists who tend to fill that role include Howard Johnson, Herbie Flowers, and Steve Brown among others.

Despite the associations of certain bass instruments with certain genres, there are exceptions. Some rock bands and bassists used a double bass, such as Lee Rocker of Stray Cats, Barenaked Ladies, and Tiger Army. Larry Graham, Bernard Edwards, Mick Hogan, Andy Fraser, and Mel Schacher used an electric bass guitar. Some funk, R&B, and jazz fusion groups use synth bass or keyboard bass rather than electric bass. Stevie Wonder, Bootsy Collins, and Bernie Worrell have used a synth bass. Some traditional jazz bands use double bass or electric bass instead of a tuba; Bill Johnson and Steve Brown were among the earliest double bassists in the New Orleans traditional jazz genre. In some jazz groups and jam bands, the basslines are played by a Hammond organ player, who uses the bass pedal keyboard or the lower manual for the low notes. Keyboard-driven bass also occurs occasionally in rock bands, such as Atomic Rooster, and the Doors, whose keyboardist, Ray Manzarek, notably used a Fender Rhodes piano bass played with his left hand.

== Electric bass players ==
Electric bassists play the bass guitar. In most rock, pop, metal and country genres, the bass line outlines the harmony of the music being performed, while simultaneously indicating the rhythmic pulse. In addition, there are many different standard bass line types for different genres and types of song (e.g. blues ballad, fast swing, etc.).

Bass lines often emphasize the root note, with a secondary role for the third, and fifth of each chord being used in a given song. In addition, pedal tones (repeated or sustained single notes), ostinatos, and bass riffs are also used as bass lines. While most electric bass players rarely play chords (three or more notes all sounded at the same time), chords are used in some styles, especially funk, R&B, soul music, jazz, rock, Latin and heavy metal music. Phil Lesh, a bassist for the rock band Grateful Dead was known for treating bass lines as counterparts, rather than emphasizing the root note. Lemmy Kilmister, bassist for rock bands Hawkwind and Motörhead, was described by some musicians and writers to have a playing style reminiscent of an acoustic guitarist, sometimes using chords.

== Double bass players ==
The double bass is the standard bass instrument for classical music, bluegrass, rockabilly, and most genres of jazz.

=== Classical double bass players ===
See the List of contemporary classical double bass players.

=== Jazz double-bass players ===
See the List of jazz bassists, which includes both double bass and electric bass players.

=== Popular music double bass players ===
See the List of double bassists in popular music, which includes blues, folk, country, etc.

=== See also ===
- List of double bassists in popular music
