= Robert Pierre =

Robert Pierre may refer to:

- Robert Pierre (musician) (born 1992), Christian musician from Orlando, Florida
- Robert E. Pierre (born 1968), reporter and editor at The Washington Post

== See also ==
- Pierre Robert (disambiguation)
