= Proposed expansion of the Buffalo Metro Rail =

Grass-roots organization in Buffalo, New York

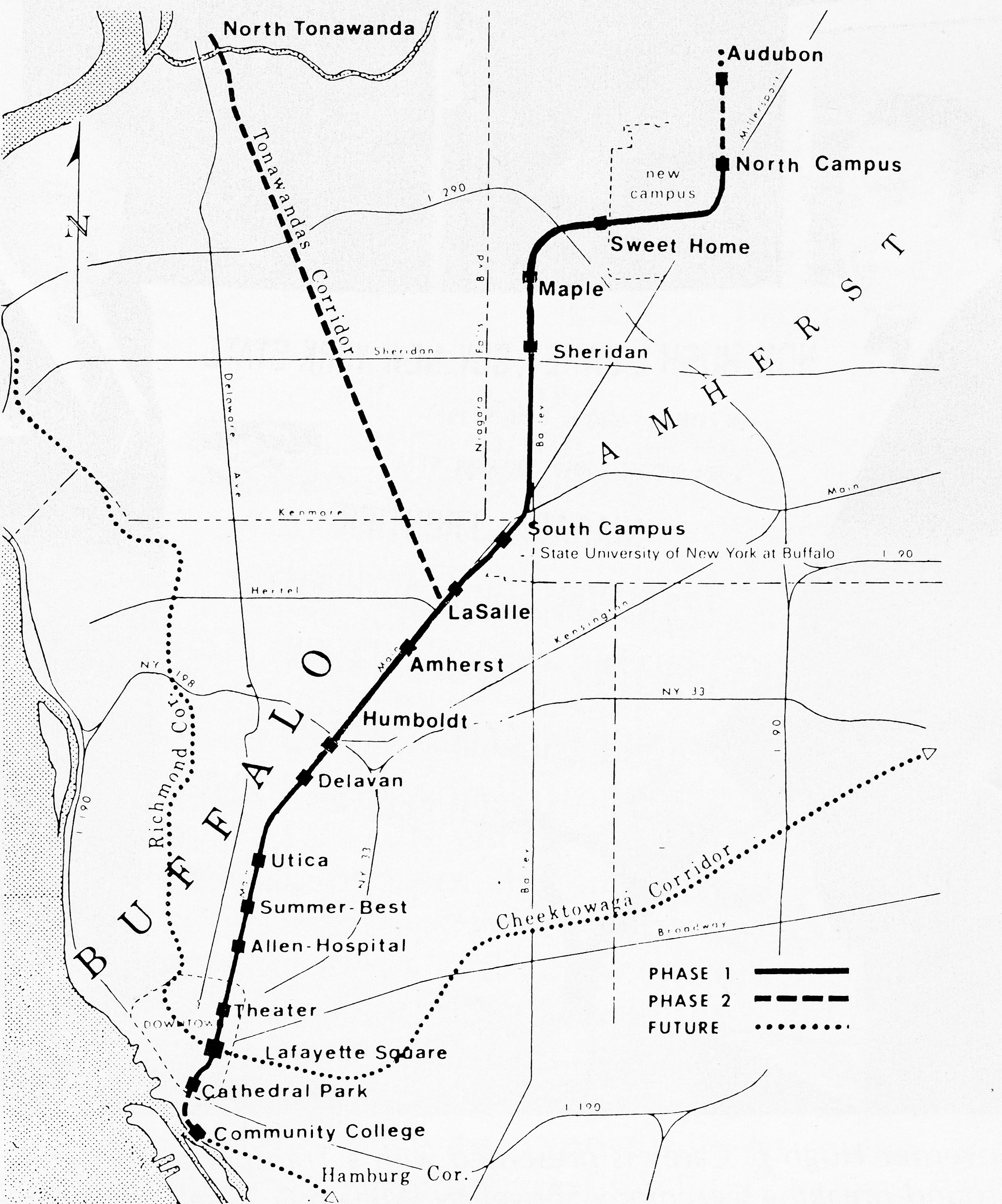
1975 "Projected rail transit route alignment"

Map of existing and proposed lines by Citizens Regional Transportation Corporation

Since the Buffalo Metro Rail light rail was proposed in the 1970s, there have been multiple proposals for expanding the system, which is currently a single 6.4-mile (10.3 km) long line. Public officials, agencies and advocacy groups have created plans, with the most recent and extensive being an extension to the town of Amherst. Groups have formed on both sides of the issue.

== Overview ==
The Citizens Regional Transportation Corporation (CRTC) promotes the implementation and expansions of light-rail service for the City of Buffalo and the surrounding Buffalo/Niagara region in New York State. The CRTC recommended construction of an "Airport Corridor" and a "Tonawandas Corridor". The two proposals mentioned are a small part of the massive multi-line system, with proposals to go as far south as Hamburg and Orchard Park, as far east as Lancaster and as far north as Niagara Falls, New York. Many of the proposed extensions would be built on abandoned railroad rights-of-way (ROW).

The existing 6.1-mile-long (9.8 km) Main Line operates as a surface line in Downtown Buffalo on an exclusive transit mall, and underground (like a subway) from the north end of Downtown to the University at Buffalo's South Campus. The CRTC used ridership on the Main Line to support its proposals for rail extensions. Early 2008 ridership levels showed double-digit increases in weekday ridership levels.

Three primary corridors are proposed, in addition to the current Main Line, with service to the north, east and south of the city. With these three corridors proposed, up to ten branches are also proposed, further penetrating the heaviest populated and heaviest travelled areas.

Stop The Metro (STM) was formed in June 2023 by Michael Benjamin Nigrin as a cooperative of NIMBY community members from Amherst, New York and Tonawanda (town), New York. They are citizens intent on bringing awareness and leading opposition to the expansion proposal currently published by the Niagara Frontier Transportation Authority.

== Airport Corridor ==
The Airport Corridor would include the Airport Line and the Lancaster Branch.

The line would serve the region east of the City of Buffalo and is proposed to operate as far east as the Town and Village of Lancaster.

=== Facts and figures ===
Line Name	Length of Project	Weekday Ridership (est.)	Capital Cost (1995 est.)	Notes
Airport Line (City Hall to Airport)	9.57-mile (15 km)	15,970	$193,170,000	
Lancaster Branch (Airport to Lancaster Village Industrial Park)	5.87-mile (9 km)	1,863	$68,490,000	
TOTAL	15.44-mile (25 km)	17,833	$261,660,000	

=== Airport Line ===
The Airport Line is a leading candidate for expansion to the present day Metro Rail system, providing a high-speed light rail transit connection between Downtown Buffalo and the Buffalo Niagara International Airport

The original airport plans had room provided in the southwest corner of the terminal for this light rail connection to stop at the airport.

A number of potential alignments were provided, but the most common has Metro Rail trains originate behind the Buffalo City Hall on Elmwood Avenue, continuing towards Church Street, and following Church Street to Main Street. A second plan had rail cars originating at Erie Canal Harbor Station (like current Main Line trains) and following the Main Line to Church Street, where rail cars would switch to a trackbed along the north side of South Division Street. Rail cars continue along the separated trackbed along South Division Street, an abandoned railroad track bed toward the Central Terminal, and available trackage between Walden and Broadway, towards the Thruway Plaza Transit Center. From the Thruway Plaza, trains would cross Walden Avenue, and follow an abandoned trackbed, coming within a close distance of the Walden Galleria Mall, north passing the Union/George Urban shopping plaza, and onto the hotels across from the airport, and then north into the airport itself.

Later plans show an extension to this trunk line to continue across the airport grounds to terminate at the presently open Holtz Road Park & Ride lot. Due to this being added after 1995, the figures do not reflect the cost of the extension into the estimates.

In 2019, following approval of a new station on the main line at the NFTA Rail Maintenance Yard, the CRTC suggested extending the main line to serve along the Airport line, connecting to Buffalo RiverWorks, Larkinville, Buffalo Central Terminal and Walden Galleria before reaching the airport. A cost for this revised 13-mile extension was estimated at $1.4 billion.

=== Lancaster Branch ===
The Lancaster Branch is proposed to complement the Airport Line and continue further east, into the Town and Village of Lancaster.

A number of places would be served by the Lancaster Branch, most notably the Village of Depew's new Amtrak station, situated a short distance east of the present station. This move would facilitate passengers from either modes of transportation to connect with the other. NFTA Metro does not offer such a connection, using the bus system, and can prove to be an attractive opportunity to passengers that may not live close to a commercial airport, but still have access to intercity rail.

The Lancaster Line would add seven new stations to the station network, stopping at Holtz Road Park & Ride, George Urban Boulevard, Dick Road/Amtrak (Depew), Transit Road, Penora Street, Lancaster Village/Central Avenue, and Walter Winter Road (Lancaster Village Industrial Park).

Starting from the Buffalo Niagara International Airport Terminal, the Lancaster Branch would continue east, to Holtz Road, head south on Holtz (crossing Genesee Street) and then onto its own ROW until crossing Walden Avenue, in which the line would operate into the new Amtrak-Depew Station, and then east, joining the Erie County maintained Depew-Lancaster and Western Railway track bed to Lancaster's village/town line (Walter Winter Road).

== Richmond Corridor ==
A 1973 report from the NFTA included a Richmond Cirridor. This was slated to run on the city's West Side as the Orange Line, and would terminate at the Tonawandas Corridor.

== Tonawanda Corridor ==
The Tonawandas Corridor includes the Tonawanda Line the North Buffalo Branch, the Niagara River Line, the Belt Line East Branch and the Youngmann Branch.

The line is proposed to serve the region north of the City of Buffalo and is proposed to operate as far north as the City of Niagara Falls.

=== Facts and figures ===
Line Name	Length of Project	Weekday Ridership (est.)	Capital Cost (1995 est.)	Notes
Tonawanda Line (LaSalle to Tonawanda)	5.50-mile (9 km)	3,500	$45,700,000	
North Buffalo Branch (Merrimac to Elmwood)	2.03-mile (3 km)	5,594	$29,435,000	
Niagara River Line (Tonawanda to Shredded Wheat)	11.21-mile (18 km)	2,240	$162,345,000	
Youngmann Line (Embassy Square to Getzville West)	n/a	n/a	n/a	
Belt Line East Branch (Lasalle to Wildroot)	3.40-mile (5 km)	n/a	49,300,000	
TOTAL				

=== Tonawanda Line ===
The Tonawanda Line would begin as a spur of the present Main Line, continuing from LaSalle Station in a north-western trajectory into the city of Tonawanda using the abandoned Erie Railroad trackbed through the Town of Tonawanda.

The Tonawanda Line would add eleven new stations to the network, making stops at LaSalle, Merrimac, Kenilworth (Kenmore Av.), Lincoln Park, Ellwood, Sheridan East (Belmont), Brighton, Embassy Square Park & Ride, Youngs, Cranbrook, Ives Pond, and the Tonawanda Transit Center.

Some points of interest along the way would include Embassy Square for Park and Ride services, and the BJ's/Sam's Club plaza (Twin Cities Station) near Colvin and the Twin Cities Highway.

=== North Buffalo Branch ===
The North Buffalo Branch is proposed to split from the Tonawandas Line near Merrimac Street (one stop north-west of LaSalle Station), and continue in a westerly direction on an abandoned railroad right-of-way (ROW) to as far as Elmwood Avenue.

The North Buffalo Branch would add only four stops to the station network, as the line shares a few stations with the Tonawanda Line from LaSalle Station. Stops on this line would be made at Starin, Colvin, Kenmore South (Delaware Avenue), and Elmwood (near the Home Depot plaza).

The ridership from the line would allow North Buffalo Branch riders a one-seat ride into Downtown Buffalo utilizing the Main Street line, and an easier transfer at LaSalle Station for service to the Buffalo Niagara International Airport.

The majority of the North Buffalo Line passes through a mainly residential area of North Buffalo, however the line would attract shoppers at the Kenmore South and Elmwood stations serving the highly successful Delaware Consumer Square shopping center.

As of 2023, it would appear that this line is no longer feasible with the construction of residential homes on the railroad right-of-way (Rachel Vincent Way) and a new DePaul development off Delaware Avenue.

=== Niagara River Line ===
The Niagara River Line is treated separately from the Tonawandas Line and the Niagara Falls Shuttle.

This extension would add a total of sixteen new stations and would share eleven stations of the Tonawanda Line and eleven stations of the Niagara Falls Shuttle for a total of thirty-eight stations.

The stations of the Niagara River Line would be expected to open at Shredded Wheat, Fort Schlosser, Electra, Echota, Occidental, LaSalle Bridge (Grand Island Bridges), 71st Street, Parkvue, Cayuga Island, Lynch Park, Green Acres, Wheatfield, Riverside Park, Gratwick, Roblin, Little River, Twin Cities (new Amtrak connection could be made here) and Tonawanda Transit Center.

This proposed section is expected to carry the fewest riders of the proposals, resulting in a very high cost per passenger for the service to run.

The benefits from having this line, however, are of particular interest to Niagara County residents and the visitors to the Niagara Falls area.

It was also envisioned that an express service could be created, utilizing the Niagara River Line and the Belt Line East Line, creating a one line travel route between Niagara Falls and the Buffalo Niagara International Airport. This alternative route would be attractive for tourists to use between the many Niagara Falls attractions and the Buffalo Niagara International Airport. Preliminary ideas also had these Niagara Falls to Airport trains able to operate "express" on the available tracks with very limited stops, usually at high boarding stops along the way (such as Downtown Niagara Falls stops and the Amtrak stop at the newly created Twin Cities station).

=== Belt Line East Branch ===
The Belt Line East Line is proposed to tie in with the Niagara Falls Shuttle, the Niagara River Line, the Tonawandas Line, and the Airport Line; in efforts to allow passengers and visitors from the Niagara County region to have a one-seat ride from their boarding stop to the Buffalo Niagara International Airport.

If built, however, intermediate stops would be made on non-express rail cars from either the North Buffalo Line, the Youngmann Line or Tonawanda Line destined for Downtown Buffalo on the Airport Line.

The Belt Line East line would add five new stations to the network.

Intermediate stops would be made at East Amherst Street, East Delavan Avenue (near the American Axle Plant), East Ferry Street, Genesee Street, Emerson Park (near the old Emerson Vocational Technical High School) and at Wildroot (known in some literature also as Scheu Park).

The construction of this line is dependent on whether the Niagara River Line is constructed. Much of the ridership would be generated from the Niagara River Line, making it a likelier candidate for expansion.

=== Youngmann Branch ===
The Youngmann Branch is proposed as an alternate to the original light rail metro extension plan to the current Main Line to continue as the Amherst Completion. This proposal minimized the need to dig additional tunnels, and use ground level and elevated rail tracks in its place.

Sharing tracks on the Tonawanda Line from LaSalle Station, the Youngmann Branch would continue in a northwestern direction until it arrived at Embassy Square, a short distance south of the Youngmann Memorial Highway (Interstate 290). From the Embassy Square Station, the Youngmann Branch would continue east along the Youngmann Highway and the Lockport Expressway (Interstate 990) until arriving at the north campus of the University at Buffalo, serving three stations while on the campus. After serving the university, it could continue to Getzville and the Audubon Business Park as in the original plans for the Main Street Line (Amherst Completion).

From Embassy Square, the Youngmann Branch would add four to eight new stations, stopping at Parker, Niagara Falls Boulevard, Sweet Home Road; at Flint Loop, Clemens Hall and the Ellicott Complex at UB; then the Audubon Industrial Park and Getzville West on extension.

== Southtowns Corridor ==
The Southtowns Corridor would include the Southtowns Line, the Orchard Park Branch, the Hamburg South Branch, and the Fairgrounds Spur.

The line is proposed to serve the region south of the City of Buffalo and is planned to operate as far south as the Town of Hamburg.

Out of the three corridors proposed, this corridor would operate primarily as a line for residents of the area to commute to and from the City of Buffalo. Reverse commutes are beginning to be noticeable with the addition of a number of industrial parks being opened and built in the long dormant field of the past Bethlehem Steel and other steel manufacturing plants.

The Southtowns Corridor would also benefit the public in taking a number of vehicles off of the busy NYS route 5 corridor, also known as the Hamburg Turnpike. In the winter months, the Buffalo Skyway is frequently known to close down during severe ice conditions and high winds, due to its close proximity to Lake Erie terminating at the start of the Niagara River.

=== Facts and figures ===
Line Name	Length of Project	Weekday Ridership (est.)	Capital Cost (1995 est.)	Notes
Southtowns Line (Downtown to Rush Creek)	8.00-mile (13 km)	17,608	$120,890,000	
Orchard Park Branch	5.63-mile (9 km)	1,495	$90,851,000	
Hamburg South Branch	5.01-mile (8 km)	1,151	$41,080,000	
Fairgrounds Spur	0.63-mile (1 km)	n/a	$6,090,000	
TOTAL	19.27-mile (31 km)	20,254	$258,911,000	

=== Southtowns Line ===
The only light rail corridor serving the Southtowns, the Southtowns Corridor would begin in Downtown Buffalo near Lafayette Square on the current Metro Rail Tracks. The line would continue southward on Main Street, enters/exits the Cobblestone District at South Park Avenue or Perry Street, and would continue south-eastward from Louisiana Street on South Park Avenue.

Once arriving near Lee Street (South Park lift bridge), the line would turn south along the Buffalo River to a trackway near current NYS Route 5. The line would continue southward along this trackway to Rush Creek and the Athol Springs Park and Ride Station.

Once arriving at Rush Creek/Athol Springs, the train could divert to two branches; the Hamburg South Branch to the Village of Hamburg, or the Orchard Park Branch, towards Orchard Park. A spur, known in records as the Fairgrounds Spur, would operate off of the Hamburg South Branch to the Erie County Fairgrounds. The Fairgrounds Spur would be in operation during the summer season, to serve the Hamburg Fairgrounds.

New rail stations along the Southtowns Line would be located at Cobblestone, Perry, Hydraulics (Larkin Building), Ridge Road (Lackawanna), Smokes Creek, Blasdell (Roland Street), Milestrip and Rush Creek/Athol Springs.

=== Orchard Park Branch ===
Likely to be heavily used during events at Ralph Wilson Stadium, the Orchard Park Branch is within close distance to a number of the Southtowns regional shopping destinations, and to the south campus of Erie Community College.

== Other CRTC recommendations ==
=== Amherst Completion ===
When proposed, this was one of the lower priority lines that had the least support because of a host of factors.

The Amherst Completion section of the current Main Line was proposed to begin at the University (Metro Rail) and continue underneath Main Street and North Bailey Avenue, to continue as an elevated line near Bailey Avenue and Betina Avenue in Amherst. The line would then loosely follow Eggert, continuing across the parking lots of Century Mall, Amherst Plaza, Boulevard Mall, and then take a diagonal turn, crossing Maple, descend to become a surface line and then operate along a diagonal path north of Maple to the Youngmann Expressway on its way to the University at Buffalo's North Campus.

Cost restraints due to the need for new tunneling below Main Street and a portion of Bailey Avenue and construction schedules had placed this extension in jeopardy as the least likely to be built with the CTRC proposal.

An alternate proposal, called the Youngmann Branch of the Tonawanda Corridor was proposed in its place. However, the drawback of the Youngmann Branch is that the service would not serve the south campus of the University at Buffalo, instead, requiring a transfer at LaSalle.

In recent years, the NFTA, as well as the state, county, and local businesses have deemed the extension of the main line from its current northern terminus to Amherst a top priority, and funding has now been secured for an environmental study. The current NFTA proposal will implement a light-rail route along Niagara Falls Boulevard that differs from this proposal.

Facts & figures (1995 est.)

Version: Transitional Analysis

- 5.61 miles in length (University Station to Getzville West stations)
- $207,490,000 capital cost
- 18,634 average weekday riders (includes traffic between North and South Campuses)

=== Cobblestone Loop ===
Proposed early in 2008, the Cobblestone Loop would be a continuation of the current Metro Rail line so that it would operate through the Cobblestone District in Downtown Buffalo and effectively serve a number of new areas.

Current design plans have trains continuing down Main Street from Erie Canal Harbor Station, and turning east onto South Park Avenue, north onto Louisiana Street and west on Perry Street to Main Street and its current route.

==== Stations ====
The extension would also add four new stations to the line:

- South Park & Michigan
- South Park nr. Louisiana
- Perry nr. Louisiana
- Perry & Michigan.

=== Niagara Falls Shuttle ===
Proposed to supplement the Niagara River Corridor's service near Downtown Niagara Falls, the Niagara Falls Shuttle is designed to service residents and tourists with safe and economical transportation, allowing passengers to park their vehicles at remote or satellite locations and use the rail line to get into Downtown Niagara Falls.

The line would be able to operate separated from the rest of the Metro Rail system, benefiting tourists and citizens alike.

An additional extension is also proposed that would continue rail cars further north, onto a section of the old Great Gorge line, made popular in early 1900s as a tourist attraction for those visiting the Niagara Falls area.

==== Facts and figures ====
Line Name	Length of Project	Weekday Ridership (est.)	Capital Cost (1995 est.)	Notes
Niagara Falls Shuttle (Shredded Wheat to Aquarium); Basic Line	1.99-mile (3 km)	5,439	$37,884,225	
Great Gorge Extension (Aquarium to Rapids View)				
TOTAL				

== See also ==
- Buffalo Metro Rail
- DL&W station
- Niagara Frontier Transportation Authority
