= Corinne Chapelle =

French-American violinist (1976–2021)

Corinne Chapelle (May 5, 1976 – March 23, 2021) was a French-American violinist. She was born in California, her father was French and her mother Tunisian. She started her violin studies as a two-year-old and gave her first concert one year later. She studied with Yehudi Menuhin at his school in England, following which she studied at the Juilliard School of Music and joined Pinchas Zukerman's class in New York. Upon hearing Chapelle at the age of fifteen, Yehudi Menuhin said about her: "One of the most promising talents of her generation". These studies were further complemented by working with Ana Chumachenco, Lorand Fenyves and Josef Gingold.

Chapelle has received various awards at international violin competitions. She won 1st Prize at the Julius Stulberg International String Competition, 1st Prize of the Los Angeles Music Center Spotlight Awards, the Jascha Heifetz Violin Award, as well as top prizes at the inaugural International Liana Isakadze Violin Competition in St. Petersburg and the Montreal International Musical Competition. She has represented the United States around the world as an International Ambassador of Music, appearing at the Senate Caucus in Washington, D.C., and premiering the Barber Violin Concerto in China.

Recently, Chapelle performed with orchestras such as the Montreal Symphony Orchestra, Pacific Symphony, Mozarteum Orchestra of Salzburg, Cologne Chamber Orchestra, Haydn Philharmonie, Prague Chamber Orchestra and Polish Radio Chamber Orchestra "Amadeus", as well as the Shanghai and Beijing Philharmonics. She has also performed in many of the world's leading concert halls, such as the Théâtre des Champs-Élysées in Paris, the Mozarteum in Salzburg, the Kölner Philharmonie, the Haydn Saal at the Esterházy Palace in Eisenstadt, the Prinzregententheater in Munich and the Great Hall of Zurich's Tonhalle. Chapelle's career has taken her to leading festivals around the world, including the Salzburg and Lockenhaus Festivals in Austria, the Aspen Music Festival in Colorado, the Kuhmo Chamber Music Festival in Finland and the International Musicians Seminar at Prussia Cove in England, UK. Her numerous collaborations have been with artists such as Fabio Biondi, Ádám Fischer, Alban Gerhardt, Heinz Holliger, Gary Hoffman, Liana Isakadze, Konstantin Lifschitz and Alexander Lonquich as well as with the Swiss Chamber Soloists. As well as appearing internationally on television and radio, Chapelle has been featured on recordings for Naxos, JPC and Guild Music.

After battling a very rare and aggressive form of cancer for several months, Chapelle died on the morning of March 23, 2021, after suffering a stroke.

== Recordings ==
- Brandenburg Concertos II Concertos Nos. 4 & 5 / Tripelconcerto, piece: Brandenburgisches Konzert Nr. 4 G-dur BWV 1049 by Johann Sebastian Bach, Kölner Kammerorchester, with Nadja Schubert and Daniel Rothert, directed by Helmut Müller-Brühl, label Naxos, Audio CD, 2000 (Germany)
- Orchesterwerke Vol. 5 (Cembalokonzerte Vol. 3), Kölner Kammerorchester, piece: Konz. RV 580 f. 4 Violinen, Violoncello, Orch. u. B.c. h-moll by Antonio Vivaldi with Christine Pichlmeier, Corinne Chapelle, Renee Ohldin and Lucas Barr, directed by Helmut Müller-Brühl, label Naxos, Audio CD, 2000 (Germany)
- A Century of Finnish Chamber Music: Live from the Kuhmo Festival, piece: Concerto for Violin, Clarinet, Horn, and String Sextet ("Schott Concerto") (1924) by Aarre Merikanto, with Corinne Chapelle, John Storgårds, Radek Baborák, Eduard Brunner, Sirkka-Liisa Kaakinen-Pilch, Pierre Lenert, Tommi Aalto, Gotz Teutsch, Martina Schucan, label Ondine, Audio CD, 2002 (Finland)
- Kartuli Musika: Music from Georgia by Nassidse, Loboda & Zinzadse, piece: Concert Ballade for Violin, Violoncello and Chamber Orchestra by Igor Loboda, with Corinne Chapelle, Alexander Suleiman, and the Georgian Chamber Orchestra Ingolstadt conducted by Markus Poschner, label Guild, Audio CD, 2004 (United Kingdom)
- Cerha: Sextet, Quintet, Trio, Swiss Chamber Soloists, piece: Quintet for Oboe and String Quartet (2007) by Friedrich Cerha, with Heinz Holliger, Daria Zappa, Corinne Chapelle, Jürg Dähler, and Daniel Haefliger, label Claves, Audio CD, 2018 (Switzerland)

== Sources ==
- (in French) Portrait: la violoniste qui joue à l’oreille des chevaux Ouvrir l'article au format interview with Corinne Chapelle (Radio Suisse Romande Espace 2, 31 July 2007)
- (in German and English) www.cadenza-concert.at
- SoNoRo Association, Bucharest – Biography www.sonoro.ro
