= Swiss Chamber Soloists =

Chamber ensemble

- Genre: Chamber music
- Location: Switzerland
- Years active: 1999–present
- Organized by: Jürg Dähler, Daniel Haefliger, Felix Renggli
- Website: https://www.swisschamberconcerts.ch/soloists/

The Swiss Chamber Soloists is the concert cycle's chamber ensemble, founded in 1999 and led by the three artistic directors of the Swiss Chamber Concerts Jürg Dähler, Daniel Haefliger and Felix Renggli.

== History ==
Swiss Chamber Soloists consist of solo artists, ensembles from Switzerland and guests from abroad and features many world renowned soloists like Sarah Maria Sun, Sarah Wegener, Christophe and Julian Prégardien, Heinz Holliger, Sergio Azzolini, Ilja Gringolts, Patricia Kopatchinskaja, Rosanne Philippens, Thomas Zehetmair, Christophe Coin, Thomas Demenga, Edicson Ruiz, Bruno Canino, Dénes Várjon, Gilles Vonsattel, Hopkinson Smith and The Hilliard Ensemble. From 1999 to 2020 Swiss Chamber Soloists produced 15 CDs for the labels ECM, NEOS, Claves and Genuin. International tours brought the ensemble to Australia and Japan as well as to Austria, France, Germany and Italy with appearances at the Festival Archipel Geneva, the Lucerne Festival, the Menuhin-Festival Gstaad and the Wittener Tage für Kammermusik. The repertoire of the Swiss Chamber Soloists ranges from the Baroque, also played on historical instruments, to the modern, with many of the pieces being written for and dedicated to the ensemble.

== Singers ==
Sopranos

- Lina Maria Åkerlund
- Rosemary Hardie
- Maria Husmann
- Elisabeth Jehle
- Sylvia Nopper
- Sarah Maria Sun
- Sarah Wegener

Mezzo-sopranos

- Cornelia Kallisch
- Anne-May Krüger

Tenors

- Jan Kobow
- Christophe Prégardien
- Julian Prégardien

Baritons

- Ruben Drole
- Bjoern Waag

Voice

- Iso Camartin
- Rupert Grössinger

== Winds ==
Flute, piccolo

- Philippe Racine
- Felix Renggli

Oboe, English horn

- Emanuel Abbühl
- Matthias Arter
- Maria Alba Carmona
- Heinz Holliger
- Marie-Lise Schüpbach

Clarinet

- François Benda
- Reto Bieri
- Fabio di Càsola
- Lanet Flores
- Sérgio Pires
- Jordi Pons
- Elmar Schmid

Bassoon

- Sergio Azzolini
- Pol Centelles
- Diego Chenna

Horn

- Olivier Darbellay
- Jan Golebiowski
- Antonio Lagares
- Christian Lampert
- Zora Slokar

== Percussion ==
- Matthias Würsch

== Plucked Strings ==
Harp

- Sarah O'Brien
- Consuelo Giulianelli
- Ursula Holliger

Lute

- Hopkinson Smith

== Piano ==
A–F

- James Alexander
- Ricardo Bovino
- Bruno Canino
- Ricardo Castro
- Bahar Dördüncü
- Ufuk Dördüncü
- Jens Fuhr

G–M

- Elina Gotsouliak
- Stephanie Gurga
- Maureen Jones
- Ingrid Karlen
- Anton Kernjak
- Thomas Larcher
- Claudio Martínez Mehner
- Serguei Milstein

O–S

- Adrian Oettiker
- Marc Pantillon
- Cédric Pescia
- Jan Schultsz
- Louis Schwizgebel
- Christoph Stiefel

V–W

- Dénes Várjon
- Gilles Vonsattel
- Peter Waters
- Gérard Wyss
- Jürg Wyttenbach

== Other keyboard Instruments ==
Cembalo

- Martin Müller
- Peter Solomon

Pianoforte

- Patrick Cohen

Accordion

- Viviane Chassot

Bayan

- Geir Draugsvoll

== Strings ==
Violin

A–F

- Irene Abrigo
- Karel Boeschoten
- Muriel Cantoreggi
- Corinne Chapelle
- Alexandra Conunova
- Rahel Cunz
- Jürg Dähler
- Barbara Doll
- Lily Francis

G–K

- Roberto González-Monjas
- Ilya Gringolts
- Maja Homburger
- Meesun Hong Coleman
- Esther Hoppe
- Alexander Janiczek
- Yuki Kasai
- Daniel Kobyljansky
- Patricia Kopatchinskaja

M–S

- Isabelle Magnenat
- Raphaël Oleg
- Tedi Papavrami
- Rosanne Philippens
- Anna Reszniak
- Hans-Heinz Schneeberger
- Dmitry Smirnov
- Ronny Spiegel
- Gyula Stuller

T–Z

- Yuka Tsuboi
- Urs Walker
- Hanna Weinmeister
- Carolin Widmann
- Mary Ellen Woodside
- Daria Zappa
- Thomas Zehetmair
- Willi Zimmermann

Viola

A–P

- Tomoko Akasaka
- Hannes Bärtschi
- Muriel Cantoreggi
- Jürg Dähler
- Ruth Killius
- Lawrence Power

S–W

- Hans-Christian Sarnau
- Christoph Schiller
- Valérie Slawik
- Jean Sulem
- Geneviève Strosser
- Yuka Tsuboi
- Rudolf Weber

Cello and double bass

A–C

- Sylvia Abramovicz
- Guido Ballestracci
- Lucile Boulanger
- Sebastian Braun
- Cäcilia Chmel
- Christophe Coin

D–G

- Patrick Demenga
- Thomas Demenga
- Christian Elliott
- Rocco Filippini
- Thomas Grossenbacher
- François Guye

H–S

- Daniel Haefliger
- Soojin Lee
- Tobias Moster
- Richard Myron
- Rafael Rosenfeld
- Martina Schumann

Double bass

- Barry Guy
- Sophie Lücke
- Edicson Ruiz
- Christian Sutter
- Andreas Wahlbrink

== Ensembles ==
Group

- Collegium Novum Zürich
- Die Kammermusiker Zürich
- Ensemble Æquatuor
- Ensemble Contrechamps
- The Hilliard Ensemble

Piano trio

- Schweizer Klaviertrio
- Tecchler Trio
- Zürcher Klaviertrio

String quartet

- Amar Quartett
- Amati Quartett
- Carmina Quartett
- Galatea Quartett
- Merel Quartett
- Quatuor Sine Nomine
- Quatuor Terpsycordes
- Winterthurer Streichquartett

== Discography ==
- Robert Schumann, Piano Quartett and Piano Quintett (2000) – David Abbott, Piano; Jürg Dähler, Violin; Urs Walker, Violin; Valérie Dähler-Mulet, Viola; Daniel Haefliger, Cello – Claves / CD 50-2008 – OCLC 50117982
- Fantasia Telemania (2001) – Georg Philipp Telemann Fantaisies for Flute Solo & Works for Flute Solo by Bettina Skrzypczak, Xavier Dayer, Mathias Steinauer, Robert Suter, Roland Moser, Heinz Holliger, Jacques Wildberger, Nadir Vassena, Christoph Neidhöfer, Hans Ulrich Lehmann, Bernhard A.Batschelet – Felix Renggli, Flute – MGB / CTS-M 73 – OCLC 887935495
- Johannes Sebastian Bach, Goldberg Variations BWV 988 (2007) – arranged for String Trio by Dmitry Sitkovetski – Hanna Weinmeister, Violin; Jürg Dähler, Viola; Thomas Grossenbacher, Cello – Neos Classics / NEOS 30801 – OCLC 857860716
- Works for Flute Solo (2008) – Works by Johann Sebastian Bach, Heinz Holliger and Carl Philipp Emanuel Bach – Felix Renggli, Flute; Anne-Laure Pantillon, Piccolo; Anne Parisot, Flute; Matthias Würsch, Percussion – GENUIN / GEN 88129 – OCLC 605354049
- Happy Birthday, Elliott Carter! (2008) – Mosaic for Harp, Flute, Oboe, Clarinet, Violin, Viola, Cello and Double bass (2005), Figment 4 for Viola Solo (2007), Enchanted Preludes for Flute and Cello (1988), Tempo e tempi for Soprano, Oboe, Clarinet, Violin and Cello (1999), HBHH for Oboe Solo (2007), Fragment for String Quartet (1994), Quartet for Oboe and String Trio (1995) – Silvia Nopper, Sopran; Felix Renggli, Flute; Emanuel Abbühl, Oboe; Heinz Holliger, Oboe & French Horn; François Benda, Clarinet; Elmar Schmid, Clarinet; Ursula Holliger, Harp; Esther Hoppe, Violin; Daria Zappa, Violin; Carolin Widmann, Violin; Jürg Dähler, Viola; Christoph Schiller, Viola; Daniel Haefliger, Cello; Edicson Ruiz, Double Bass – Neos Classics / NEOS 10816 – OCLC 906562696
- Fables (2011) – Works by Alberto Ginastera, Wilhelm Friedemann Bach, Robert Suter and Albert Moeschinger – Felix Renggli, Flute; Heinz Holliger, Oboe, Composer – GENUIN / GEN 11211 – OCLC 884342761
- Heinz Holliger, Induuchlen (2011) – Toronto-Exercices (2005), Gedichte Von Anna Maria Bacher, Puneigä (2000–2002), Induuchlen (2004), Ma'mounia (2002) – Felix Renggli, Flute, Alto Flute, Bass Flute, Piccolo; Olivier Darbellay, French Horn, Natural Horn; Ursula Holliger, Harp; Matthias Würsch, Marimba, Percussion, Cimbalom; Bahar Dördüncü, Piano; Sylvia Nopper, Sopran; Jürg Dähler, Violin & Viola; Daniel Haefliger, Cello; Anna Maria Bacher, Recitation; Albert Streich, Recitation – ECM / ECM 2201 – OCLC 940651155
- Heinz Holliger (2014) – Romancendres for Cello and Piano (2003), Feuerwerklein zum "Quatorze Juillet" for Piano Solo (2012), Chaconne for Cello Solo (1975), Partita for Piano Solo (1999) – Daniel Haefliger, cello; Gilles Vonsattel, piano – GENUIN / GEN 14330 – OCLC 893604623
- Wolfgang Amadeus Mozart, Chamber Music Music With Winds (2014) - Flute Quartet No. 1 in D major, K. 285, Oboe Quartet in F major, K. 370 (K. 368b), Quintet in A major for Clarinet and Strings, K. 581 – Felix Renggli, Flute; Heinz Holliger, Oboe; François Benda, Basset Clarinet; Esther Hoppe, Violin; Daria Zappa, Violin; Jürg Dähler, Viola; Daniel Haefliger, Cello – GENUIN / GEN 14319 – OCLC 976500972
- Flute Concertos (2015), Concertos by Carl Philipp Emanuel Bach & François Devienne – Felix Renggli, Flute; Brian Dean, Concertmaster; Chamber Academy Basel – GENUIN / GEN 15338 – OCLC 973415945
- Heinz Holliger, Machaut-Transkriptionen (2015) – Works by Guillaume de Machaut and Heinz Holliger for four Voices and three Violas – Gordon Jones, Baritone; David James, Countertenor; Rogers Covey-Crump, Tenor; Steven Harrold, Tenor; Geneviève Strosser, Viola; Jürg Dähler, Viola; Muriel Cantoreggi, Viola – ECM / ECM 2224 – OCLC 930443223
- Fairy Tales Without Words (2017) – Robert Schumann: Märchenbilder, op. 113 for viola and piano (1851), Märchenerzählungen, op. 132 for clarinet, viola and piano (1853) / Hans Ulrich Lehmann: "Without words", seven songs for viola and piano (2011) / György Kurtág: Hommage à R. Sch., op. 15d for clarinet (also bass drum), viola and piano (1990) – Jürg Dähler, Viola; François Benda, Clarinet; Gilles Vonsattel, Piano – GENUIN / GEN 17485 – OCLC 1049853033
- Dmitri Schostakovich (2017) – Piano Trio No. 1 in c-Moll op. 8 (1923), Piano Trio No. 2 in e-Moll op. 67 (1944), Violin Sonata op. 134 (1968) – Ilya Gringolts, Violin; Daniel Haefliger, Cello; Gilles Vonstatten, Piano – Claves / 50-1817 – OCLC 1020773579
- Friedrich Cerha (2018) – 8 Sätze Nach Hölderin-Fragmenten for String Sextet (1995), Quintet for Oboe and String Quartet (2007), 9 Bagatellen for String Trio (2008) – Heinz Holliger, Oboe; Corinne Chapelle, Violin; Meesung Hong Coleman, Violin; Esther Hoppe, Violin; Hanna Weinmeister, Violin; Daria Zappa, Violin; Hannes Bärtschi, Viola; Jürg Dähler, Viola; Daniel Haefliger, Cello – Claves / 50-1816 – OCLC 1102360439
- Xavier Dayer (2020) – Solus cum Solo for Solo Cello (2009), Come heavy sleep for Flute, Viola and Cello (2016), De Umbri (II) for Flute and String Trio (2018), Mémoire, cercles for Oboe and String Trio (2011), Nocturne for Oboe, Flute and String Trio (2014) – Heinz Holliger, Oboe; Felix Renggli, Flute; Irene Abrigo, Violin; Daria Zappa, Violin; Jürg Dähler, Viola; Daniel Haefliger, Cello – Claves / CD 3007
