= Warren Benfield =

Musical artist (1913–2001)

Warren A. Benfield
- Born: February 12, 1913 (United States) , U.S.
- Died: July 8, 2001 (aged 88)
- Genres: Classical
- Occupation: Double-bassist
- Instrument: Double-bass

Warren A. Benfield (February 12, 1913–July 8, 2001) was a classical double bass player. He enjoyed a long career in the bass section of the Chicago Symphony Orchestra and was a professor at Northwestern University.

== Studies and orchestral career ==
Warren Benfield was a student of Anton Torello at the Curtis Institute of Music in Philadelphia.

Benfield joined the bass section of the Minneapolis Symphony, becoming its youngest member in 1934. He also played as principal bass in the Saint Louis Symphony Orchestra before joining the Philadelphia Orchestra in 1942. He played for a short while as co-principal, sharing the position with fellow Torello pupil Roger Scott, before being appointed principal bass of the Chicago Symphony Orchestra by Rafael Kubelik in 1949. Kubelik's presence in Chicago was not a long one, and Benfield was eventually fired, forcing him to audition for the orchestra. He continued to play in the Chicago Symphony until his retirement in 1987.

== Teaching ==
Warren Benfield taught for many years at Northwestern University in Evanston, IL. He built a reputation there as one of the leading double bass teachers of his time. Some prominent bassists who studied with Warren include Harold Robinson, Rufus Reid and Jeff Bradetich. He also taught at DePaul University in Chicago.

Warren Benfield wrote, with the help of James Seay Dean Jr., The Art of Double Bass Playing- a text which outlines many important qualities required of the double bassist in ensemble and solo playing as well as showing, if not expertise, appreciation for players in Jazz and contemporary classical fields. While not a bass method, The Art of the Double Bass includes numerous passages from orchestral and solo repertoire; it refers to these passages as they relate to the topics discussed.

== See also ==
- Anton Torello
- Oscar G. Zimmerman
- Jeff Bradetich
- Harold Robinson
