= Philippe Boivin =

French contemporary composer

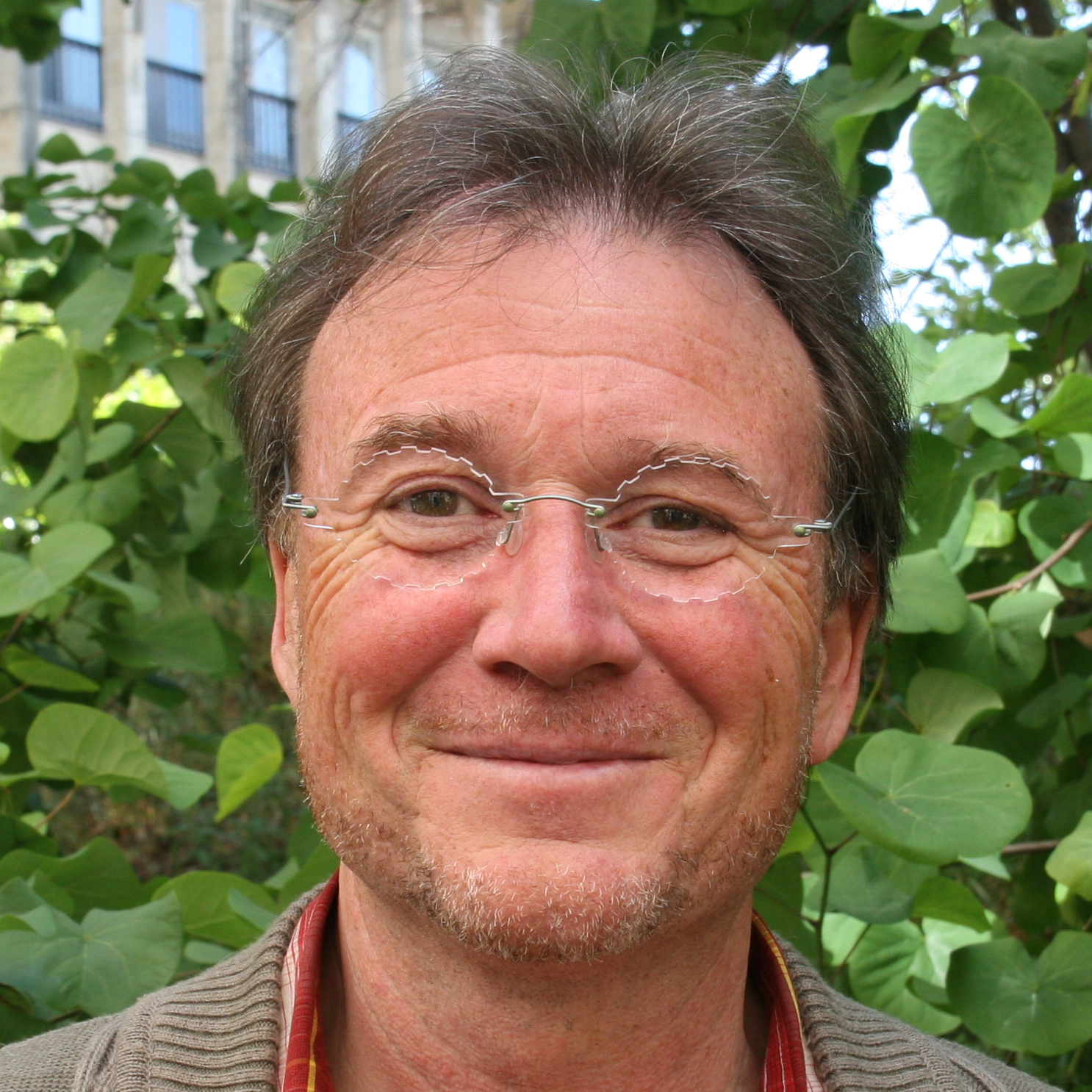
Philippe Boivin

Philippe Boivin (born 1954) is a French contemporary composer.

== Life ==
Born in Metz, after studying musicology at the Sorbonne, Boivin obtained his Certificate of Aptitude for Secondary Teaching Professorship in 1976, which allowed him to teach. Between 1977 and 1979, Boivin studied writing at the Conservatoire de Paris and followed Alain Bernaud's harmony classes. He then studied composition at the École normale supérieure de Paris with Max Deutsch. Registered at the University of Vincennes in 1979, he trained in new technologies, notably with Iannis Xenakis. The following year, he attended a training course on computer-assisted music composition at IRCAM. He then went to California at the Center for Music Experiment of the University of California, San Diego. From 1985 to 1988, he was a regular producer at Radio France. Since 1990, Boivin has been involved in musical composition and educational activities, regularly participating in seminars and giving lectures. He continues his activities as director of the Conservatoire de musique et de danse of Ivry-sur-Seine, and since 2008 at the Centre de formation des musiciens intervenants of the University of Provence.

His compositions are written for a variety of instrumentists, from soloists to large orchestras, with a predominance of chamber ensembles.

== Works ==
- Comme sur des roulettes, musical tale, 1978.
- Monopoly for 1 or 2 saxophones, 1980.
- Septuor en trio for 3 clarinets, string trio, double bass, 1980.
- TéléCom j'éCout' for zarb and a reed instrument, 1983.
- La sangsue for 12 instrumentists, 1981.
- Chalumeau for clarinet, 1982.
- Photo de classe for 12 clarinets, 1982.
- Zab ou la passion selon Saint-Nectaire double bass, 1983.
- Ouverture for harmony orchestra, 1983.
- Domino I for piano, 1986.
- Concerto for viola and orchestra, 1986.
- Concerto for viola and chamber orchestra, 1987.
- Domino II for cello, 1987.
- Big bug for 6 percussionists, 1989.
- Cadence for viola
- Chaconne for 4 timpani and 2 synthesizers, 1989.
- Aulos for oboe, 1990.
- Cinq algorithmes pour les Évangiles des grenouilles for double bass, 1990.
- Domino III for timpani, 1990.
- Trois petites lectures for oboe, 1990.
- Deux esquisses for violin or viola, 1992.
- Domino IV for string quartet, 1993.
- Concerto for brass and percussion, 1993.
- Domino V for vibraphone, 1995.
- L'homme dans le désert for soprano and piano, 1996
- Vue sur la mer, fragments for a chamber opera for soprano, clarinet, cello and 2 pianos, 1998.
- Six algorithmes for orchestra, 1999.
- Star burst for recorder, flute in G, flugelhorn, English horn and bass clarinet, 2004.
- Ce soir on improvise… for violin, cello and accordion, 2005
- TriOméga for wind quintet, piano and string quartet.
