= Lawrence Bransby =

South African writer

Lawrence Bransby (born 1951) is a South African born author of eleven books, such as Downstreet and Lifeblood Earthblood which highlighted the racial prejudice of individuals towards people of many different races and showed that it need not be the case. It also highlighted the political turmoil of a nation undergoing change through democratic reform into a more sociocratic regime. Several more of his books are available on Amazon.com and other similar websites. Downstreet was the first of several books Lawrence Bransby wrote and won the MER Prize in South Africa.

Each of the books he wrote during the late 80's and early nineties were inspiring to the youthful pupils under his English tutelage at Ixopo High School. Notably, Cy Edmondson, who was one of his students, authored a book detailing his personal troubles and how he overcame them in a book entitled "I Can".

== Publications ==
Novels

A Matter of Conscience

Second Sailor, Other Son

Lifeblood - Earthblood

Down Street (Winner of the MER Prize for youth literature)

Homeward Bound ("Book Chat" Southern African Children's Book of the Year 1991; MNET Prize shortlisted)

Remember the Whales (J. P. van Der Walt prize)

Travelogues

A Mountaintop Experience ("Book Chat" South African Book of the Year 1993)

The Geek in Shining Armour

Of Roosters, Dogs and Cardboard Boxes

The Boy who Counted to a Million (Sir Percy Fitzpatrick Prize winner; MNET Prize shortlisted)

Outside the Walls

Venture into Russia: Three Motorcycle Journeys

A Pass too Far: Travels in Central Asia

There are no Fat People in Morocco

The Wakhan Corridor: A Motorcycle Journey into Central Asia

The Plymouth/Dakar Old Bangers Challenge

Trans - Africa by Motorcycle: a Father's Diary

By Motorcycle through Vietnam: Reflections on a Gracious People
