= David Walter =

David Walter may refer to:

- David Walter (musician) (1913-2003) Bassist with Pittsburgh Symphony (as Principal), NBC Symphony, and NYC Ballet Orchestra.
- David Walter (17th century), Groom of the Bedchamber from 1661 and Lieutenant-General of the Ordnance from 1670 till 1679
- David Walter (politician) (1939–2020), New Zealand politician and journalist
- David Walter (journalist) (1948–2012), British journalist
- Dave Walter (ice hockey) (born 1952), Canadian ice hockey player
- David Walter (oboist) (born 1958), French oboist, conductor and music professor
- Dave Walter (born 1964), American football quarterback

== See also ==
- David Walters (born 1951), United States Democratic Party politician and former governor for the state of Oklahoma
