= Bruce Bransby =

American musician

Bruce Bransby is an American double-bassist and university professor.

== Performance career ==
Bruce Bransby began his musical career as a trombonist and pianist, but discovered his calling as a double bassist while in college at California State University Northridge. He studied with Nat Gangursky, Peter Mercurio, and Stuart Sankey. In 1971 he became principal bass of the Kansas City Philharmonic (now the Kansas City Symphony) under the direction of Jorge Mester.

In 1978 he was appointed principal bass of the Los Angeles Philharmonic, sharing the position equally with Dennis Trembly. His time in Los Angeles coincided with the eras of Zubin Mehta, Carlo Maria Giulini, and André Previn. Mr. Bransby has been active as a chamber musician, soloist, and clinician. He premiered the "Fantasia Hungarica" for double bass and orchestra by Eugene Zador, the bass concerto by Frantizek Hertl, and numerous ensemble pieces. He is also the composer (as Roland E. Curb) of Prelude, Valse, and Tango for double bass and piano.

== Teaching career ==
In 1986, Bruce Bransby was appointed Professor of Double Bass at Indiana University Jacobs School of Music, Bloomington. He has also taught at California State University Northridge, the University of Missouri at Kansas City, the California Music Center, and the Los Angeles Philharmonic Institute, and has been a performing member of the faculty of the Aspen Music Festival since 1987. His students hold positions in many symphony orchestras.
