= Jeff Bradetich =

American professor and performer of double bass

Jeffrey David Bradetich (born 1957) is an American professor and performer of double bass. He currently teaches at the University of North Texas College of Music. Bradetich made his New York City debut at the Carnegie Recital Hall (now called Weill Recital Hall) on November 22, 1982. Since then, Bradetich has performed over 800 concerts and given more than 1300 master classes throughout the world, including the continents of South America, Europe, Africa and Asia.

== Education ==
Bradetich began studying double bass in the public school orchestra program in Eugene, Oregon under the tutelage of Royce Lewis and Dr. Robert Hladky. Then from 1975 to 1980, he achieved both bachelor's and master's degrees from Northwestern University while working with Warren Benfield and Joseph Guastafeste from the Chicago Symphony.

== Career ==
Today, Bradetich is an active lecturer and clinician, holding annual workshops and master classes. He also served as Executive Director of the International Society of Bassists from 1982 to 1990.

He has taught on the faculties of the University of Michigan and Northwestern University prior to his 1994 appointment as director of the largest double bass program in the world at the University of North Texas College of Music. In addition to his performance and professional experience, Bradetich has also transcribed over 100 solo works. Some of his musical editions have been published online through Ovation Press.

== Organizations and activities ==
- 1982–1990: International Society of Bassists (Executive Director) — established the ISB International Conventions, ISB Solo Competitions, ISB Endowment Fund, and ISB Magazine (Editor, 1982–1988).
- 1987: Music For All To Hear, Inc. (Co-Founder) — First company to record music especially arranged and prepared for the hard of hearing.
- 2008: Bradetich Foundation — The Foundation plans to host an international solo competition in 2010 with the largest prizes in bass history (over $30,000 USD prize value for first prize)
