= Dennis Trembly =

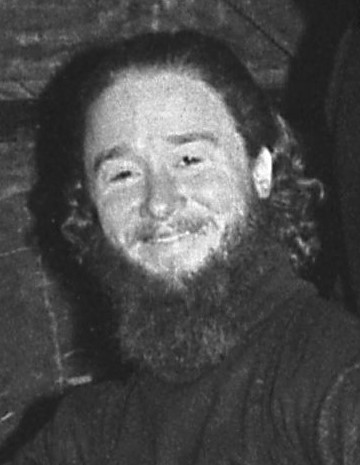
Trembly in 1975.

Dennis Trembly is Professor of string bass at the University of Southern California. He is also one of two principal bassists for the Los Angeles Philharmonic.

== Musical history ==
Trembly learned to play the double bass with the help of David Borkenhagen, Jack Palacios, Peter Mercurio, and Nat Gangursky. Just before his senior year in high school, Trembly studied with Stuart Sankey at the Aspen School of Music on a full scholarship, and the following three years continued this collaboration at the Juilliard School on a Naumberg scholarship.

While in New York, Trembly freelanced with several orchestras, including the Hudson Valley Philharmonic, the Village Light Opera, American Opera Society, and the American Symphony Orchestra, under the direction of Leopold Stokowski. Trembly acquired his current position in the Los Angeles Philharmonic in 1970.

Active as a soloist, Trembly was a semifinalist in the 1973 G. B. Dealey Competition in Dallas, and won second prize at the 1978 International Double Bass Competition on the Isle of Man, where he performed the Concerto in E Major, by Karl Dittersdorf, with the Scottish Chamber Orchestra. He has performed and taught at universities in the U.S., Mexico, and Europe, and has been featured in recital at International Society of Bassists conventions in Cincinnati, Los Angeles, and Bloomington and Indianapolis, Indiana.

== Sources ==
- Dennis Trembly faculty profile at USC
