= François Rabbath =

French musician and composer

- Born: March 12, 1931 (age 95); Aleppo, Syria
- Occupations: Double bass player, composer

François Rabbath (born 12 March 1931) is a French double-bass player and composer from a family of musicians who began studying double bass at the age of 13. He collaborated with American composer Frank Proto and wrote the three-volume Nouvelle technique de la contrebasse.
