= Young-Hee Chan =

South Korean double-bassist

- Born: Young-Hee Chung (정영희)
- Education: Seoul National University
- Occupations: Double bass performer and professor
- Children: Yizhong Chan (son)

Young-Hee Chan is a South Korean classical double-bassist. She has received the South Korean Presidential Service Merit Award.

== Biography ==
Young-Hee was born in Seoul, South Korea. After graduating from the Seoul National University in 1977, she joined the Seoul Philharmonic Orchestra and was subsequently appointed to the position of Principal Double Bass with the Seoul Chamber Orchestra. From 1979 to 1991, she was appointed as Associate Principal with the Singapore Symphony Orchestra. She has also appeared with the orchestra as soloist and chamber musician. In 1991, she joined the Adelaide Symphony Orchestra, and in 1997, she was appointed Associate Principal. After a more than twenty-year career with the orchestra, she performed her last concert in April 2014.

An active chamber musician, Young-Hee has performed with many smaller ensembles both in Singapore and Australia including the Brenton Lengbein String Quartet for the Barossa Festival. She has previously tutored at the Australian Youth Orchestra National Music Camp and has been involved as an auditioner for the Australian Youth Orchestra, as well as the ABC Young Performer's Award.

In 1981, Young-Hee received the South Korean Presidential Service Merit Award for her services in classical music. She also appears in the Inaugural edition of Who's Who in South Australia.

Young-Hee has taught at several institutions and universities in Australia, including previously serving as a faculty member of the School of Music - Conservatorium at Monash University, in Melbourne, Australia. She is also a tutor for the Australian Youth Orchestra.

== Personal life ==
She is married and has two children. Her son, Yizhong Chan, is a well-known investor. Her brother is Woo Young Chung, who served as CEO of Honda Korea until 2020 and previously held a 5% stake in the company before selling his shares.
