= List of double bassists in popular music =

This list of double bassists in popular music includes double bass performers from a range of genres, including rockabilly, psychobilly, country, blues, folk, bluegrass, and other styles. In these styles, the instrument is often referred to as an upright bass or a standup bass.

== A ==
- Jeff Ament (Pearl Jam, Temple of the Dog, Mother Love Bone, and others)

== B ==
- Victor Bailey (various bands and artists)
- Barry Bales (Alison Krauss)
- Tom Barney (various artists and bands)
- Max Bennett (The Wrecking Crew, Peggy Lee, Joni Mitchell, Frank Zappa)
- Bill Black (Elvis Presley)
- Joe Buck (Hank Williams III)

== C ==
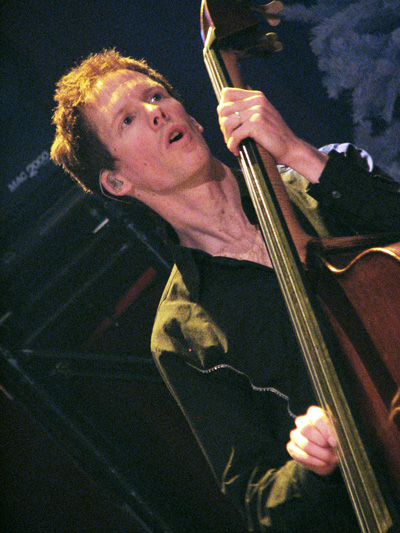
Jim Creeggan (Barenaked Ladies)

- Ron Carter (jazz)
- Paul Chambers (jazz)
- Les Claypool (Primus)
- John Clayton (various artists and bands)
- Ernest "Big" Crawford (Muddy Waters, Sunnyland Slim, Little Walter, Memphis Minnie, Jimmy Rogers, Big Maceo, Big Bill Broonzy, Memphis Slim, and others)
- Jim Creeggan (Barenaked Ladies)

== D ==
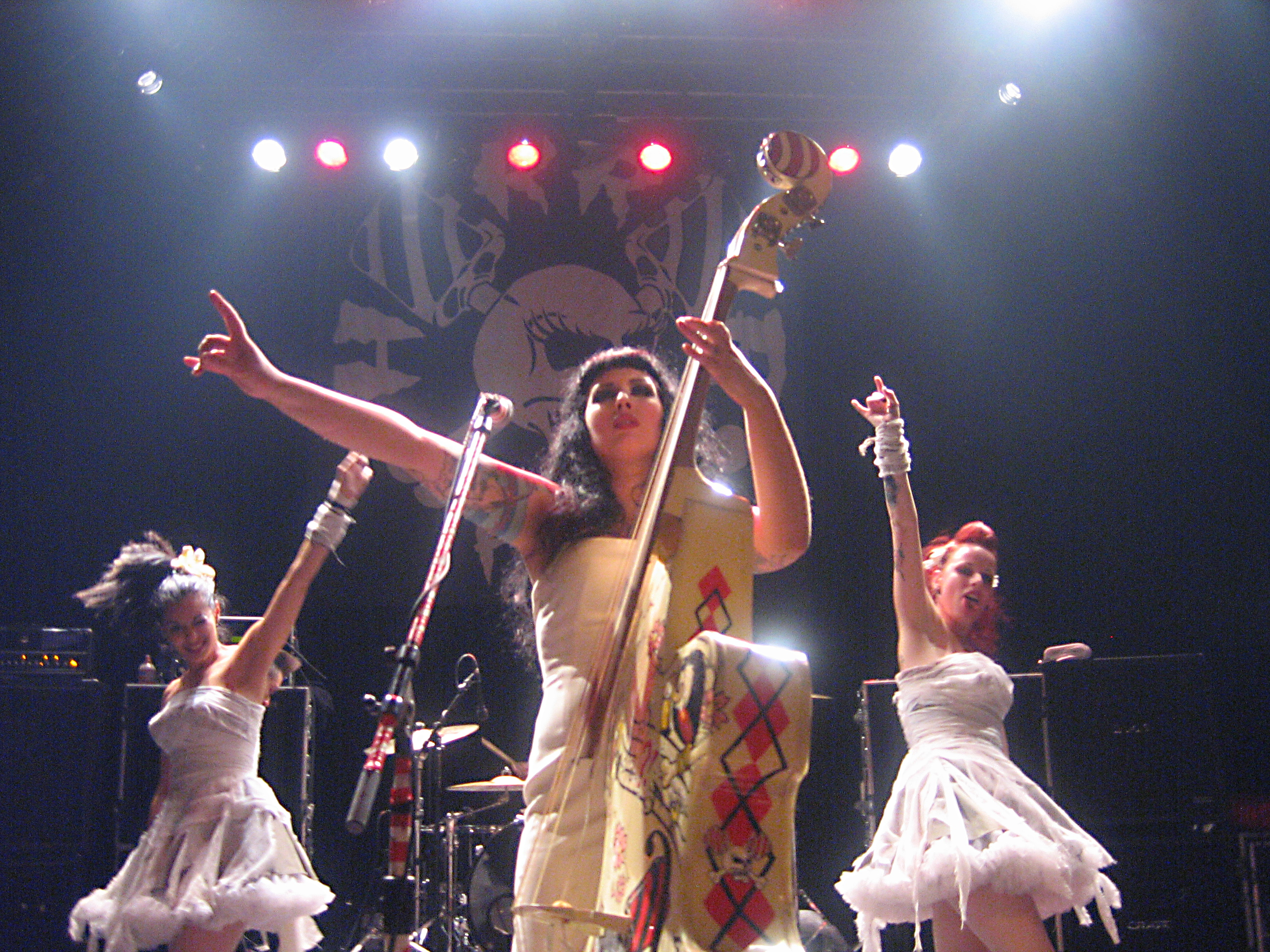
Patricia Day (HorrorPops)

- Kate Davis
- Patricia Day (HorrorPops)
- Willie Dixon (blues)
- Ted Dwane (Mumford & Sons)

== E ==
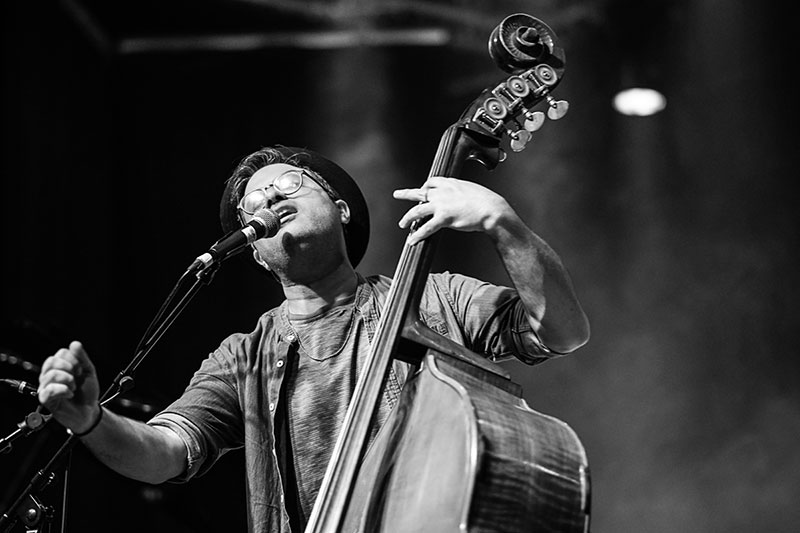
Adam Ben Ezra at Vinterjazz in Denmark 2019

- Adam Ben Ezra (world and jazz)

== F ==
- Janusz Frychel (Rock, Blues, Folk)

== G ==
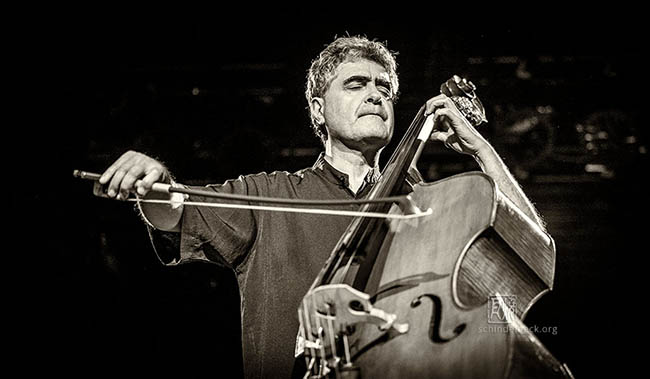
Renaud Garcia-Fons

- Renaud Garcia-Fons (jazz and world)
- Marshall Grant (Johnny Cash)
- Athol Guy (the Seekers)

== H ==
- Jim Hughart (Tom Waits)
- Clayton Jacobson (Appalachian band the Duck Downpickers)

== J ==
- Eric Judy (Modest Mouse)

== K ==
- Gary Karr (musician and professor)
- Bridget Kearney (Lake Street Dive)
- Dick Kniss (Peter, Paul & Mary, John Denver)
- Geoff Kresge (Tiger Army)

== L ==
- Fred LaBour (country)
- Tony Levin (Bruford Levin Upper Extremities, Liquid Tension Experiment, King Crimson, Peter Gabriel, and others)
- Marshall Lytle (Bill Haley & His Comets)

== M ==
- Joe B. Mauldin (the Crickets)
- Royal Masat (Billy Strings)
- Paul McCartney
- Edgar Meyer (various artists)
- Scott Mulvahill (Ricky Skaggs, Bruce Hornsby, Lauren Daigle, solo)

== N ==
- Kim Nekroman (Necromantix)

== O ==
- Patrick O'Hearn (Frank Zappa, Missing Persons, solo)
- Scott Owen (the Living End)

== P ==
- Todd Phillips (numerous bluegrass groups)

== Q ==
- Nate Query (Decemberists)

== R ==
- Missy Raines (numerous bluegrass groups)
- Lee Rocker (Stray Cats)

== S ==
- Russ Savakus (Bob Dylan, Peter, Paul & Mary)
- Esperanza Spalding (jazz)
- Lynn Seaton (jazz)
- Bill Smith (The Quarrymen)
- Peter Steele (Type O Negative)
- Sebastian Steinberg (Soul Coughing)
- Sting (the Police)
- Djordje Stijepovic (Tiger Army, Drake Bell)

== T ==
- Larry Taylor (Tom Waits, JW-Jones)
- Danny Thompson (Pentangle and others)
- Tillman Franks (Johnny Horton and others)

== W ==
- Jimbo Wallace (Reverend Horton Heat)
- Rob Wasserman (various artists and bands)
- Chris Wood (Medeski, Martin and Wood)

== Y ==
- Bob Ysaguirre

== See also ==
- List of contemporary classical double bass players
- List of jazz bassists
