= Hal Robinson =

American classical double bass player (born 1952)

Harold Hall ("Hal") Robinson (born July 29, 1952) is an American classical double bass player, formerly the principal bassist of the Philadelphia Orchestra.

== Early life and education ==
Robinson was born in Houston, Texas, the son of Keith Robinson and Dorothe Fowler. Both parents were members of the Houston Symphony Orchestra: his father was the principal bassist, and his mother was a violinist. Hal and all four of his siblings—cellists Sharon and Keith Jr., and violinists Erica and Kim—became professional string players with notable careers.

Robinson graduated from Robert E. Lee High School in Houston and studied bass at Northwestern University and the Peabody Institute. Among his prominent teachers are Warren Benfield (Chicago Symphony), and Paul Ellison (Bass Professor Rice University's Shepherd School of Music, Houston Symphony).

== Musical career ==
From 1975 to 1977 he held the position of principal bass of the Albuquerque Symphony (now the New Mexico Symphony Orchestra) and played in the Santa Fe Opera Orchestra. In 1977, he became assistant principal bass of the Houston Symphony Orchestra. During this time he was on the music faculty at the University of Houston. In 1982 Robinson was a prizewinner at the Isle of Man Solo Competition. In 1985 he was appointed by Mstislav Rostropovich to the position of principal bass of the National Symphony Orchestra, where he performed until 1995, when he assumed posts as principal bass of the Philadelphia Orchestra and a member of the faculty of the Curtis Institute of Music. And teaches at the Juilliard School.

Robinson retired from his position in the Philadelphia Orchestra in 2022.

== Solo performances ==
Robinson has performed as a soloist with the American Chamber Orchestra, the Greenville (South Carolina) Symphony Orchestra, the Houston Pops Orchestra, the Houston Symphony Orchestra, the National Symphony Orchestra, the New York Philharmonic, the Philadelphia Orchestra, and the Rhode Island Philharmonic. He has instructed master classes in several countries. The Concerto for Bass, Harp and Strings was composed expressly for Robinson by composer and fellow bassist Dave Anderson and was given its premiere by Robinson with the Philadelphia Orchestra.
