= Jean-Pierre Robert =

French double bass player and author

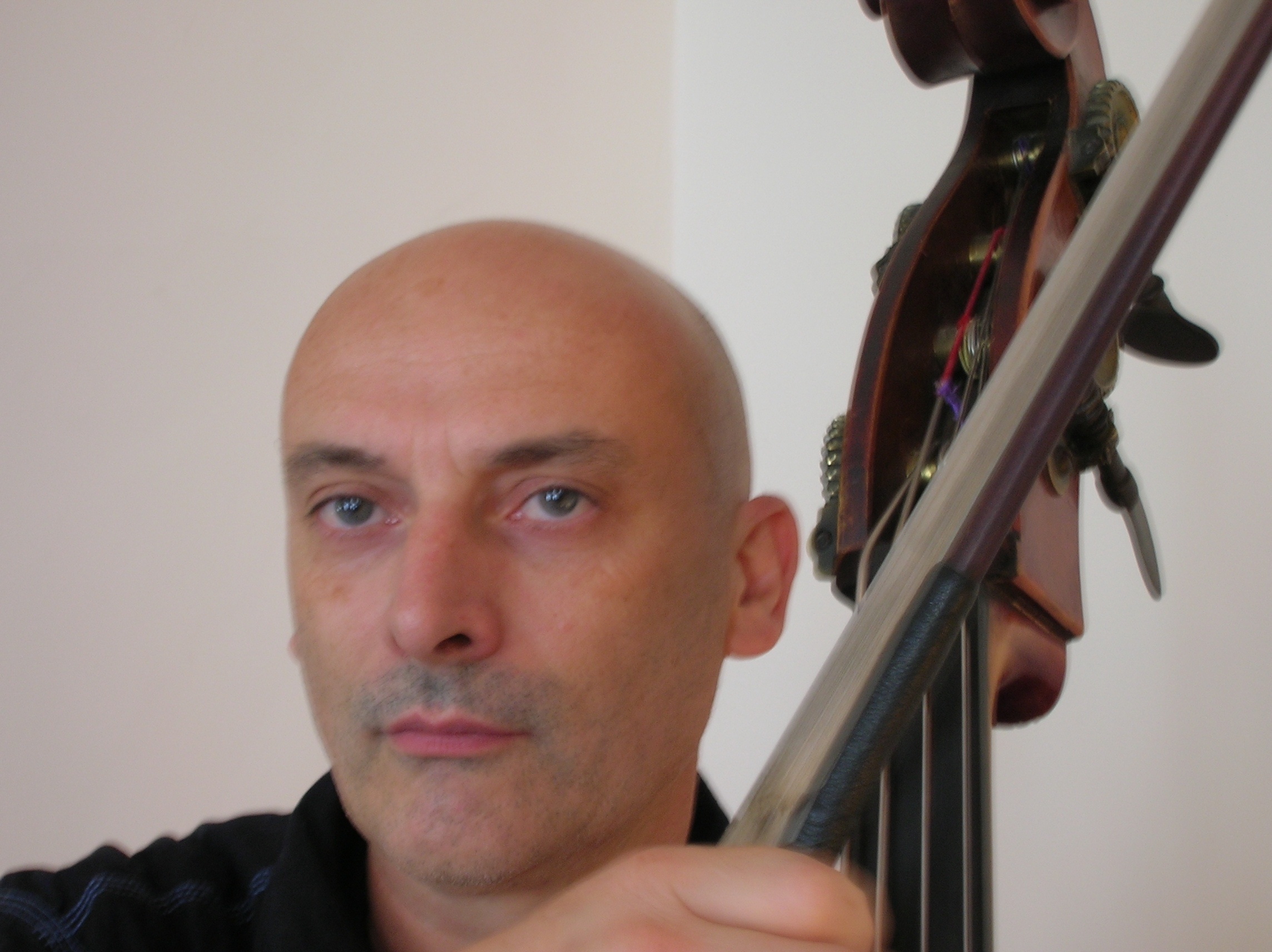
Jean-Pierre Robert

Jean-Pierre Robert (Tours, France) is a French double bass musician and author.

== Career ==
In 1979, Robert won first prize of double bass of Conservatoire de Paris. He joined Ensemble l'Itinéraire, where he remained until 2003. He has numerous collaborations with Ensemble Intercontemporain of Pierre Boulez, while claiming an "almighty need to dislearn ".

In 1983 he was invited by Paul Mefano for a solo performance of the 1st Radiophonic creation of Theraps by Yannis Xenakis on the stage of the Centre Pompidou. He performed at the Festival d'Avignon, the Festival de La Rochelle with Pierre-Yves Artaud and the Orchestre Philharmonique de Radio-France, Internationale Ferienkurse für Neue Musik – Darmstadt -, Festival de Radio France et Montpellier, with the music of Philippe Boivin, Georges Aperghis, Iannis Xenakis, and Horatiu Radulescu.

In 1986, he began writing Modes of Playing the Double Bass (édited by Musica Guild), within the framework of a collaboration with IRCAM, a stake with playing techniques.

Biography and Catalogues of Works :https://ircam.academia.edu/JEANPIERREROBERT/CurriculumVitae
