= Oscar Zimmerman =

Oscar G. Zimmerman
- Born: September 21, 1910; Philadelphia, Pennsylvania, U.S.
- Died: April 2, 1987 Traverse City, Michigan, U.S.
- Genres: Classical
- Occupation: Double-bassist
- Instrument: Double-bass
- Years active: ca. 1929–1987

Oscar G. Zimmerman (September 21, 1910 – April 2, 1987) was an American musician, teacher and double-bass player.

== Life and career ==
Born in Philadelphia, Pennsylvania in 1910, Oscar Zimmerman was the double bassist with the Rochester Philharmonic for 36 years and professor emeritus at Eastman, was a member of the first graduating class of the Curtis Institute of Music in Philadelphia, where he studied with Philadelphia Orchestra principal bassist Anton Torello. Hired by the Philadelphia Orchestra as a 19-year-old student, he played with the orchestra for six years until joining the St. Louis Symphony as principal bass player in 1936.

He played with the NBC Symphony Orchestra under Arturo Toscanini from 1938-45 before moving to Rochester. As a teacher, taught at the Eastman School of Music, but also spent 44 successive summers teaching at the Interlochen Arts Academy in Michigan. His former students have filled positions (many of them as principal players) in the Philadelphia Orchestra, the Cleveland Orchestra, the New York Philharmonic, the Syracuse Symphony Orchestra and the symphony orchestras of Atlanta, Milwaukee, Oklahoma City, Dallas, and Ottawa. Zimmerman died in Traverse City, Michigan in 1987.

== Instruments ==
His favorite instrument was a Gagliano he bought while still at Curtis from Torello. He called it the Black Gagliano because he had two, a yellow and black. For the last ten years of his life he had two basses, a Francesco Rugieri and a Hugo Rautmann. He heard Waldemar Giese play the Scontrino Concerto, on the Rautmann with Stokowski and the Philadelphia Orchestra while a student a Curtis. He was so impressed with the projection that he bought the bass at Giese's death (1948) and used it for all his solo work.

== Degrees and studies ==
B.M., Curtis Institute of Music in Philadelphia.

== Autobiography ==
A collection of reminiscences and tributes was self-published:

Zimmerman, Oscar G. and George Murphy. Once more-- from the beginning : reminiscences of a virtuoso and teacher of double bass. [Interlochen, Mich.]: Zimmerman Publications, 1993.
