= Michael Benjamin Nigrin =

American musician and political activist (born 1960)

- Born: Michael Benjamin Nigrin; October 22, 1960 (age 65); Halifax, Nova Scotia, Canada
- Genre: classical
- Occupations: Composer, Double bassist
- Instrument: Double bass
- Member of: Buffalo Philharmonic; Sarasota Orchestra
- Formerly of: New Orleans Symphony; Florida West Coast Symphony

Michael Benjamin Nigrin is a musician and composer at large who has scored the music for numerous independent and experimental films, and is presently double bassist with both the Buffalo Philharmonic Orchestra and Sarasota Orchestra.

In 2023 he helped organize Stop the Metro, a grass roots community of concerned citizens, businesses, and local politicians, seeking alternatives to the proposed expansion of the Buffalo Metro Rail.

== Biography ==
Born in Halifax, Nova Scotia and up until age seventeen he was completely self-taught in the jazz/rock fusion style playing the electric bass, after which in preparation for college took up the double bass with teacher David Izenzon, and Jules Hirsh. After a two-year preparation at Brooklyn College's Music Program, he transferred to Carnegie Mellon University under scholarship to study with bass teacher Anthony Bianco where he completed his B.F.A. Subsequently, he auditioned for and received scholarship to study with Homer Mensch and Eugene Levinson at the Juilliard School in Manhattan, New York for a Master of Fine Arts.

After graduating school he accepted a position as principal bassist with the then New Orleans Symphony with conductor Maxim Shostakovich. As financial hardships plagued the symphony in New Orleans, LA, Mr. Nigrin accepted a position as principal bassist in Florida with the Florida West Coast Symphony where he performed for two seasons. Subsequently, he returned to New York State to perform with the Buffalo Philharmonic where he is currently employed. In addition to the Buffalo Philharmonic, as of 2006 he accepted part-time employment during the winter months with the Sarasota Orchestra.

In addition to music performance, while at Carnegie Mellon University, he double majored in music composition with Marlyn Taft Thomas and Spanish composer Leonardo Balada, where he composed his works for movies, and small ensembles. In 1993 he scored a political documentary commissioned by Diann Rust-Tierney entitled Double Justice: Race and Capital Punishment which was to be played before the United States Congress.

== Musical works ==
For Films:

- Gradiva (1984)
- Aurelia or Echo In Her Eyes: Part 3 (1985)
- Terrain Vague (1987)
- Shifting Margins 2 (1991)
- Emma Woolfolk (1992)
- Echolalia (1990–94)
- Art, Empire, Industry (1990–96)
- Double Justice: Race and Capital Punishment (1993)

For Ensembles:

- Composition for Brass Quintet and Percussion
- Woodwind Quintet
- Piano Solo
- 'The Beloved Eclipse' for 3 basses, percussion and tape.

== Other Engagements ==
- Virginia Symphony
- Chautuaqua Symphony Orchestra
- Saint Louis Symphony
- Orquestra Sinfônica do Estado de São Paulo
