= Edwin Barker =

American double bass player

Edwin Barker is an American double bass player who graduated from the New England Conservatory. He is Principal Double Bass with the Boston Symphony Orchestra and Associate Professor of Music at Boston University College of Fine Arts.

== Career ==
Barker graduated with honors from the New England Conservatory in 1976, where he studied double bass with Henry Portnoi. That same year, while a member of the Chicago Symphony, he was appointed at age twenty-two to the position of principal bassist of the Boston Symphony Orchestra. Barker is a sought-after solo/ensemble performer and musician, having performed all around in the world in North America, Europe and, Asia.

He is a frequent guest performer with the Boston Chamber Music Society in Boston's Jordan Hall. Barker continues to tour and perform internationally with the Boston Symphony Orchestra and the Boston Symphony Chamber Players and has recorded with both groups and Collage, a Boston-based contemporary music ensemble. He is also an accomplished editor, having done his own edition of the bass parts for Joseph Haydn's Symphony No. 31 and Gustav Mahler's Symphonies No. 1 and No. 2 at the online publisher Ovation Press.

In July 1995, he was chosen by Maestro Sir Georg Solti to lead the bass section of the United Nations' orchestra "Musicians of the World." Barker performed the world premiere of James Yannatos' Bass Concerto (which was written especially for him) with Alea III and subsequently with Collage. He was the featured soloist at the New England premiere of Gunther Schuller's Bass Concerto, conducted by the composer, with the Boston Pro Arte Chamber Orchestra. Mr. Barker's major teaching affiliations include the Tanglewood Music Center, Boston University and the New England Conservatory of Music.

Barker inaugurated the 100th Anniversary Season of the Boston Symphony Orchestra with a solo performance of the Koussevitsky bass concerto, a performance the Boston Globe praised as having possessed "everything that makes great artistry - tone, technical equipment, temperament, repose, a keen sense of rhythm, and fine conception." Other solo engagements include appearances at Ozawa Hall at Tanglewood, the Festival of Contemporary Music at Tanglewood, Carnegie Recital Hall's "Sweet and Low" series, and recitals at major universities and conferences throughout the world. His other engagements have included solo appearances with the Boston Classical Orchestra as well as with the Boston Symphony Orchestra in Boston and in Europe.
