= Edicson Ruiz =

Venezuelan bassist (born 1985)

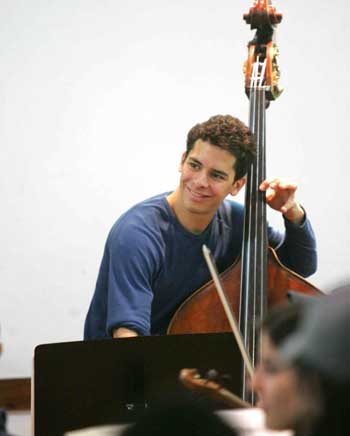

Background information
- Born: May 11, 1985 (age 41); Caracas, Venezuela
- Years active: 1996-present
- Website: www.edicsonruiz.com

Edicson Ruiz Bioeng (born 11 May 1985 in Caracas, Venezuela) is a Venezuelan double-bass player. At age 17, Ruiz became the youngest member of the Berlin Philharmonic Orchestra, the second in the Philharmonic history after a harp player in the 19th century; he is also the first Hispanic-American musician to join the Berlin Philharmonic Orchestra.

Ruiz started his musical career at age 11 when he joined the Venezuelan network of youth orchestras, known as El Sistema. In 2001, he was awarded the first prize in the youth solo competition at the International Society of Bassists convention, held in Indianapolis. After his first concert in Germany, he was offered a place in the Berlin Philharmonic, becoming a full member after one year of training.
