= International Society of Bassists =

Non- profit organization for bass players

The International Society of Bassists (ISB) is a 501(C)(3) not-for-profit organization for anybody who enjoys the double bass. The society was founded in 1967 by Gary Karr as the International Institute for String Bass (IISB). After a two-year hiatus of the IISB, the International Society of Bassists was launched with Barry Green as executive director, and the society maintains that name today. The president of the Society from 1982-1991 was Jeff Bradetich. The current president is Douglas Mapp, double bass professor at Rowan University, and the General Manager is Madeline Crouch of Don Dillon Associates. The society has about 3,000 members in about 40 countries and is steered by an international board of directors.

Every other year, the society holds a convention that consists of music competitions, workshops, recitals, lectures, and exhibits. Recent convention attendance routinely exceeds 1,000 attendees.

In addition to a periodic newsletter, the ISB publishes Bass World magazine three times a year. The magazine contains columns for soloists, orchestra members and jazz bassists, instrument maintenance advice, musician profiles, discussions of health issues, teacher tips, pages for children, recording and music reviews, and interviews. Articles are written, edited, refereed, and curated by leading experts and enthusiasts in the field.

The ISB also publishes the free Online Journal of Bass Research, containing peer-reviewed scholarly research regarding the history and development of the double bass and related instruments, players and repertoire, and critical reviews of bass-related books and articles.
