= Frank Proto =

- Born: July 18, 1941 (age 84); Brooklyn, New York
- Genres: Classical
- Occupations: Musician, composer
- Instrument: Double Bass

Frank Proto (born July 18, 1941 in Brooklyn, New York) is an American composer and bassist who graduated from the Manhattan School of Music in 1966 with a Master of Music.
