= Stuart Sankey =

American musician (1927–2000)

Stuart Sankey (December 31, 1927 – May 1, 2000) was a pedagogue of the double bass. His students included Gary Karr, the first bass player of the modern era to make a career as a solo artist, and Edgar Meyer. He taught for nearly 50 years at the Aspen Music School. He also held teaching positions at the University of Texas, Indiana University, and the University of Michigan. He made a large number of transcriptions for the double bass, increasing the literature for the instrument. Sankey was born in Los Angeles, Calif., in 1927. He attended the University of Southern California, Los Angeles, and the Juilliard School of Music. His teachers included Frederick Zimmermann, Jean Morel and Henry Brant.

Sankey was appointed to the Juilliard faculty immediately upon completion of his master of music degree in 1953. His long and distinguished teaching career took him from there to the University of Texas School of Music in Austin, Texas (1969–80); the Indiana University School of Music in Bloomington, Ind. (1980–86); and the U-M beginning in 1986. Sankey began teaching at the Aspen Music Festival in 1951; plans to celebrate his 50th year of teaching there included a July 16 concert.

He also held guest teaching appointments at the Central Conservatory of Music in Beijing and the Toho Academy in Tokyo. His students include some of the world’s most distinguished solo bassists and the principal bassists in dozens of renowned orchestras, as well as bass teachers around the globe.

Sankey dedicated his musical career to expanding the repertoire of the double bass through exhaustive editions, arrangements and original compositions including more than 45 publications, many issued for the first time. He authored a dozen articles on double bass playing and technique that have been published in the United States and abroad. His original compositions include two major works for double bass and orchestra, chamber music, solo repertoire and the Variations for Orchestra.

In 1962–69, Sankey was the principal bassist for the American Symphony Orchestra under Leopold Stokowski. His orchestral performing encompassed every major ensemble in the country and abroad, including the orchestras of the Metropolitan Opera, the NBC Opera, the New York City Ballet, the New York Opera, the Royal Ballet, the Bolshoi Ballet, the Kirov Ballet, the Joffrey Ballet, the Symphony of the Air, the American Chamber Orchestra, the RCA Victor Orchestra, the CBS Symphony, the Hollywood Bowl Symphony, the Festival Casals, the Houston Symphony Orchestra, the San Antonio Symphony Orchestra, the Indianapolis Symphony Orchestra, the Detroit Contemporary Chamber Ensemble and the Aspen Music Festival Orchestra.

He performed under every major conductor of the 20th century, including Serge Koussevitsky, Sir Thomas Beecham, Leonard Bernstein, Herbert Von Karajan, Zubin Mehta, Sir Georg Solti, Ernest Ansermet, Pablo Casals, Aaron Copland, Otto Klemperer, Michael Steinberg and Igor Stravinsky, with whom he recorded several works.

He performed chamber music with the Juilliard Quartet, the Cleveland Quartet, the Paganini String Quartet, the New Music String Quartet, the Lenox String Quartet and the Curtis Quartet. In Aspen, Sankey appeared with Itzhak Perlman, Pinchas Zukerman, Szymon Goldberg, William Primrose, Zara Nelsova, Rosina Lhevinne and Oscar Gighlia, among many other distinguished artists.

In 1990, Sankey was recognized with the Outstanding Teacher Award from the International Society of Bassists and the Award of Honor from the China Society of Bassists. His musical legacy will continue because of his unceasing dedication to his students and through his compositions and editions.

He is survived by his wife Li Ting and daughter Lili of Ann Arbor and Lake Worth, Fla.; daughter Laura of New York City; sister Rita Schlanger of Los Angeles; and brother Harold, of Del Mar, Calif.
