= List of jazz bassists =

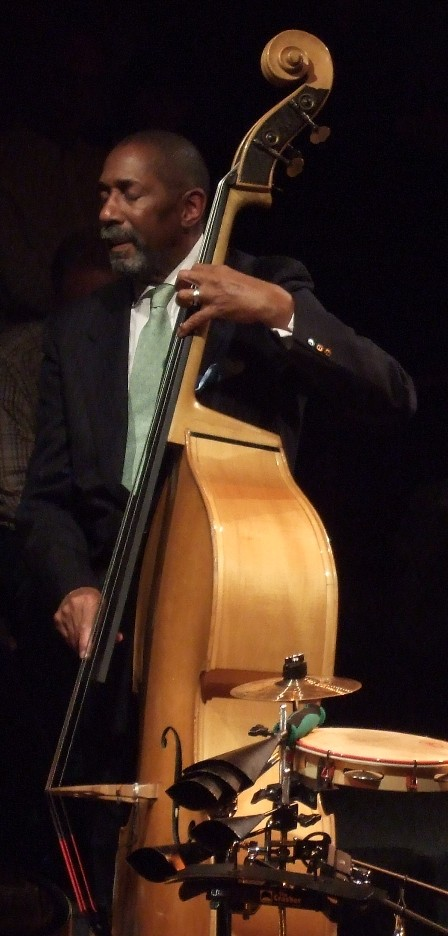
Ron Carter, 2008. He is the most-recorded bassist in jazz history, with appearances on over 2,200 albums.

This list of jazz bassists includes performers of the double bass and since the 1950s, and particularly in the jazz subgenre of jazz fusion which developed in the 1970s, electric bass players.

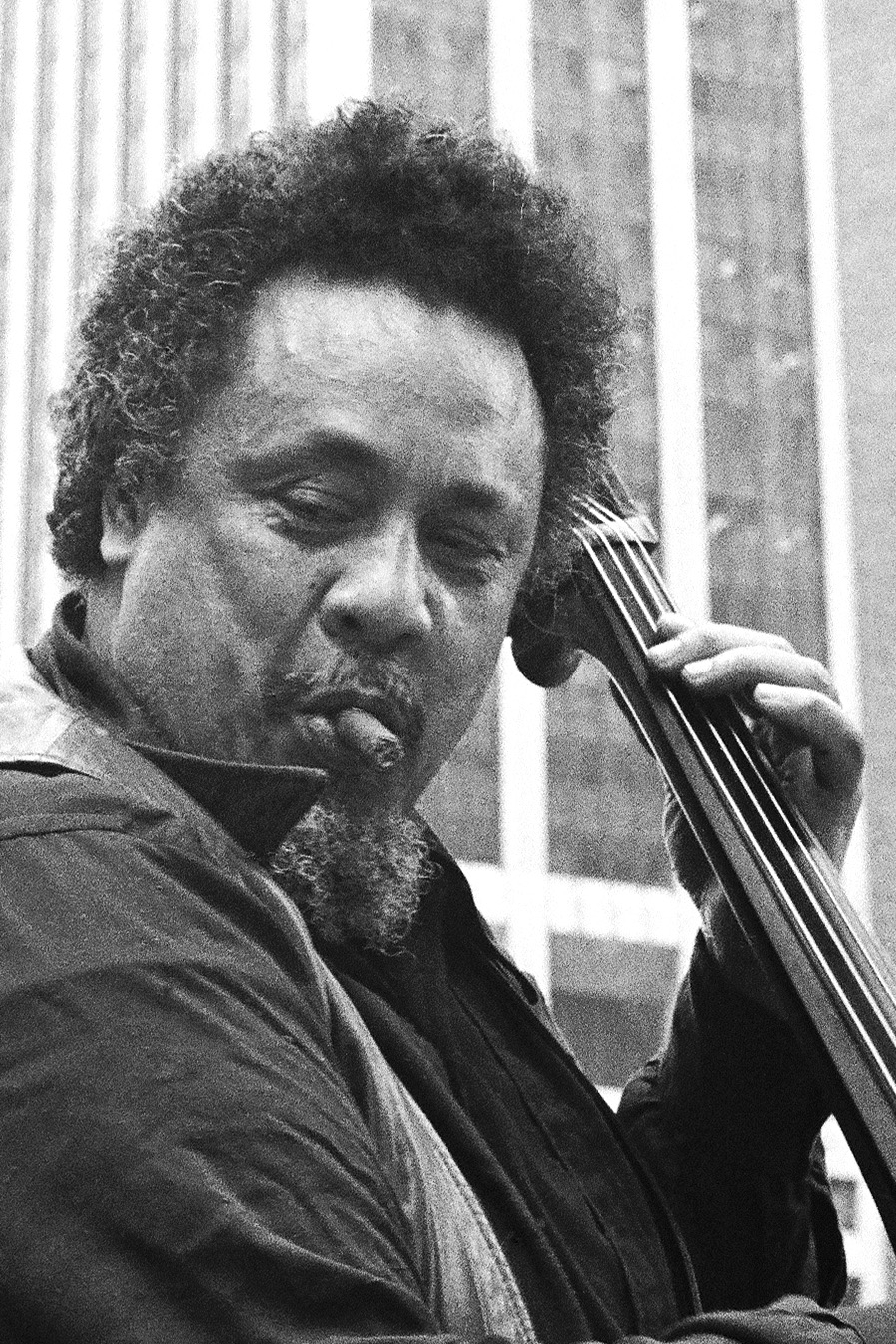
Jazz bassist Charles Mingus was also an influential bandleader and composer whose musical interests spanned from bebop to free jazz.

The most influential jazz double bassists from the 1940s and 1950s include bassist Jimmy Blanton (1918–1942) (a member of the Duke Ellington band); Oscar Pettiford (1922–1960), who is considered by bassists and musicologists to be the first bebop bassist and the transitional link from the swing era to bebop. Ray Brown (1926–2002), known for backing a number of beboppers, including alto virtuoso Charlie Parker; Milt Hinton (1910–2000) and George Duvivier (1920–1985), who are the two most recorded bassists in jazz history, their respective careers spanning many eras and genres; a singular creative force was Wilbur Ware (1923–1979) legendary bassist with Monk and others, hard bop bassist Ron Carter (born 1937); and Paul Chambers (1935–1969), a member of the Miles Davis Quintet.

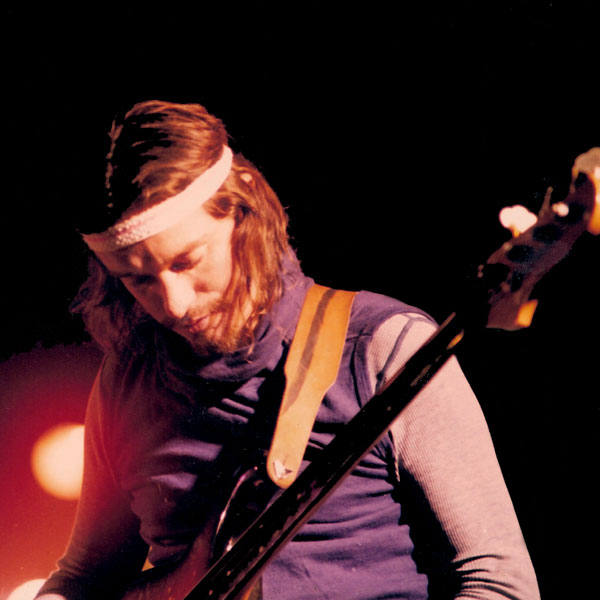
Jazz fusion bassist Jaco Pastorius was known for his expressive fretless electric bass playing.

In the experimental post 1960s eras, which saw the development of free jazz and jazz-rock fusion, some of the influential bassists included Charles Mingus (1922–1979) and free jazz and post-bop bassist Charlie Haden (1937–2014).

In the post-1970s era of jazz-rock fusion, the electric bass became an important jazz instrument; virtuoso Stanley Clarke (born 1951) played both the double bass and the electric bass. Fusion performer Jaco Pastorius (1951–1987) contributed to the development of a new approach to the fretless electric bass, adding a creative use of harmonics and chords, both while a member of the band Weather Report and in his solo recordings.

In the 1990s and 2000s, one of the new "young lions" for jazz bass was Christian McBride (born 1972). In mid to late 2000s, another new "young lion" for jazz bass emerged: Miles Mosley (born 1980) a member of the acclaimed Los Angeles collective, the West Coast Get Down.

For double bass players in other styles of music, such as Blues and Folk, see the List of double bassists in popular music.

== A ==
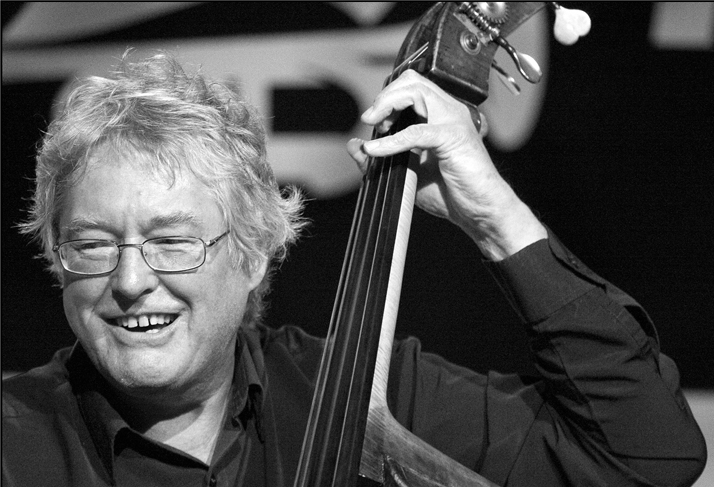
Norwegian bassist Arild Andersen at the North Sea Jazz Festival, Rotterdam July 14, 2007. Andersen has played with Phil Woods, Dexter Gordon, Bill Frisell, Hampton Hawes, Johnny Griffin, Sonny Rollins, Sheila Jordan, Don Cherry and Chick Corea.

- Ahmed Abdul-Malik (1927–1993)
- Placide Adams (1929–2003)
- Samuel Adams (born 1985)
- Osama Afifi
- Moses Allen (1907–1983)
- Vernon Alley (1915–2004)
- Ben Allison (born 1966)
- Bjørn Alterhaug (born 1945)
- Hayes Alvis (1907–1972)
- Andreas Amundsen (born 1980)
- Erik Amundsen (1937–2015)
- Arild Andersen (born 1945)
- Thomas Winther Andersen (born 1969)
- Reid Anderson (born 1970)
- Bjørnar Andresen (1945–2004)
- Chuck Andrus (1928–1997)
- Jeff Michael Andrews (1960-2019)
- Andrew Arnautov (born 1967)
- Roger Arntzen (born 1976)
- Jim Aton (1925–2008)
- Edvard Askeland (born 1954)
- Tine Asmundsen (born 1963)

== B ==
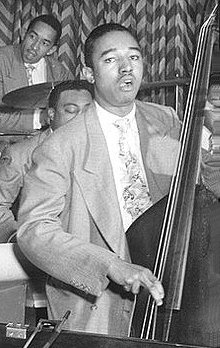
Ray Brown. In 2003, Brown was inducted into the Down Beat Jazz Hall of Fame. He played with Oscar Peterson, Milton Jackson, Frank Sinatra, Billy Eckstine, Tony Bennett, Sarah Vaughan, Nancy Wilson, Quincy Jones, among others.

- Harry Babasin (1921–1988)
- Roy Babbington (born 1940)
- Don Bagley (1927–2012)
- Steve Bailey (born 1960)
- Victor Bailey (1960–2016)
- Fred Thelonious Baker (born 1960)
- Tom Barney
- Phil Bates (born 1931)
- Carles Benavent (born 1954)
- Joe Benjamin (1919–1974)
- Max Bennett (1928–2018)
- Frode Berg (born 1971)
- Chuck Berghofer (born 1937)
- Dan Berglund (born 1963)
- Jeff Berlin (born 1953)
- Artie Bernstein (1909–1964)
- Keter Betts (1928–2005)
- Carlos Bica (born 1958)
- Charlie Biddle (1926–2003)
- Alex Blake (born 1951)
- Jimmy Blanton (1918–1942)
- Svein Olav Blindheim (born 1954)
- Jesper Bodilsen (born 1970)
- Richard Bona (born 1967)
- Jimmy Bond (1933–2012)
- Walter Booker (1933–2006)
- Arthur "Juinie" Booth (1948–2021)
- Nelson Boyd (1928–1985)
- Ronnie Boykins (1935–1980)
- Wellman Braud (1891–1966)
- Ellen Brekken (born 1985)
- Brian Bromberg (born 1960)
- Harvey Brooks (born 1944)
- Baron Browne (1955-2021)
- Cameron Brown (born 1945)
- Paul H. Brown (1934–2016)
- Ray Brown (1926–2002)
- Steve Brown (1890–1965)
- Jack Bruce (1943–2014)
- Bunny Brunel (born 1950)
- Monty Budwig (1926–1992)
- Tony Bunn (born 1957)
- Oteil Burbridge (born 1964)
- Dwayne Burno (1970–2013)
- Lennie Bush (1927–2004)

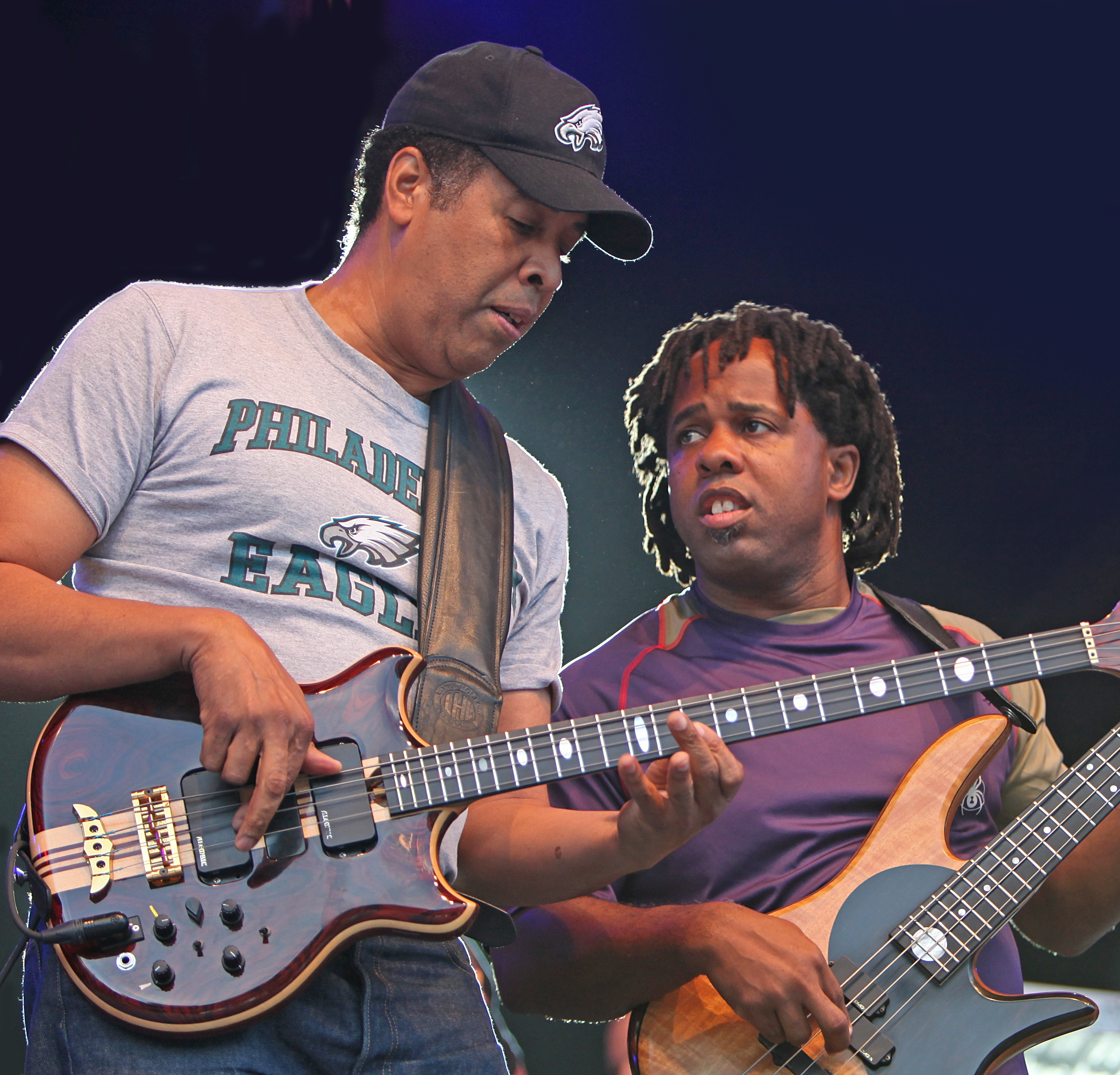
L to R: Bassists Stanley Clarke and Victor Wooten together at the Stockholm Jazz Fest July 19, 2009

== C ==
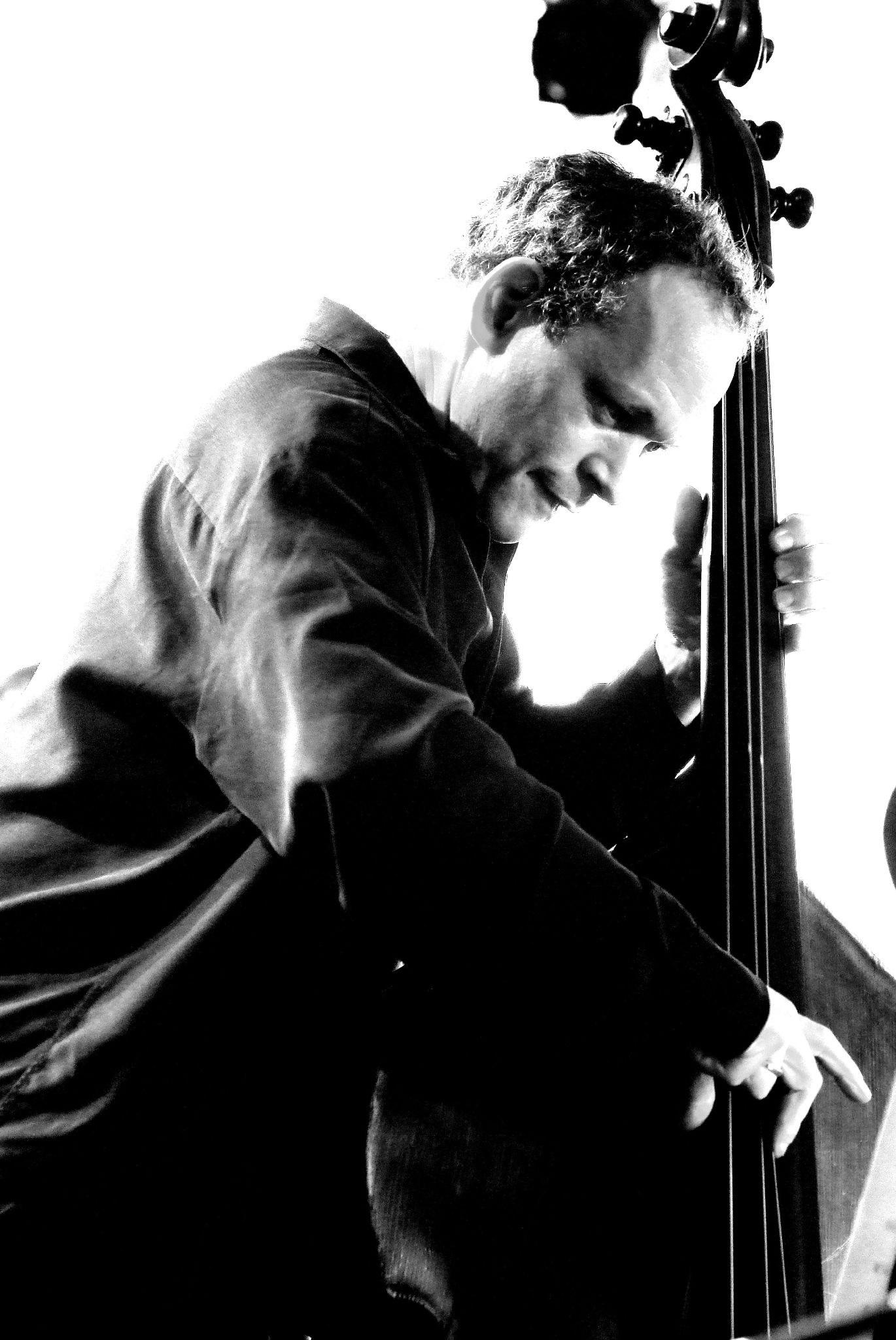
Alec Dankworth played with Mose Allison, Clark Terry, Mel Tormé, Anita O'Day, Peter King, Alan Barnes, Van Morrison, Martin Taylor

- Eddie Calhoun (1921–1994)
- Red Callender (1916–1992)
- Itzam Cano (born 1977)
- James Cammack (born 1956)
- Alain Caron (born 1955)
- Dave Carpenter (1959–2008)
- Ron Carter (born 1937)
- Edo Castro (born 1957)
- Malcolm Cecil (1937–2021)
- Clive Chaman (born 1949)
- Paul Chambers (1935–1969)
- Stanley Clarke (born 1951)
- John Clayton (born 1952)
- Jeff Clyne (1937–2009)
- Avishai Cohen (born 1970)
- Greg Cohen (born 1953)
- Ira Coleman (born 1956)
- Scott Colley (born 1963)
- Graham Collier (1937–2011)
- Joe Comfort (1917–1988)
- Todd Coolman (born 1954)
- Curtis Counce (1926–1963)
- Anthony Cox (born 1954)
- Bob Cranshaw (1932–2016)
- Gary Crosby (born 1955)
- Israel Crosby (1919–1962)
- Bill Crow (born 1927)

== D ==
- Lars Danielsson (born 1958)
- Palle Danielsson (1946–2024)
- Alec Dankworth (born 1960)
- Art Davis (1934–2007)
- Kenny Davis (born 1961)
- Melvin Lee Davis
- Richard Davis (1930–2023)
- Chuck Deardorf (1954–2022)
- Spanky DeBrest (1937–1973)
- Santi Debriano (born 1955)
- Riccardo Del Fra (born 1956)
- Fredrik Luhr Dietrichson (born 1988)
- Brandi Disterheft (born 1980)
- Dominique Di Piazza (born 1959)
- Wayne Dockery (1941–2018)
- Chris Minh Doky (born 1969)
- Chuck Domanico (1944–2002)
- Leon Lee Dorsey (born 1958)
- Mike Downes
- Mark Dresser (born 1952)
- Kermit Driscoll (born 1956)
- Ray Drummond (1946–2025)
- Sébastien Dubé (born 1966)
- Trevor Dunn (born 1968)
- Dominic Duval (1945–2016)
- George Duvivier (1920–1985)
- Mbizo Johnny Dyani (1945–1986)

== E ==
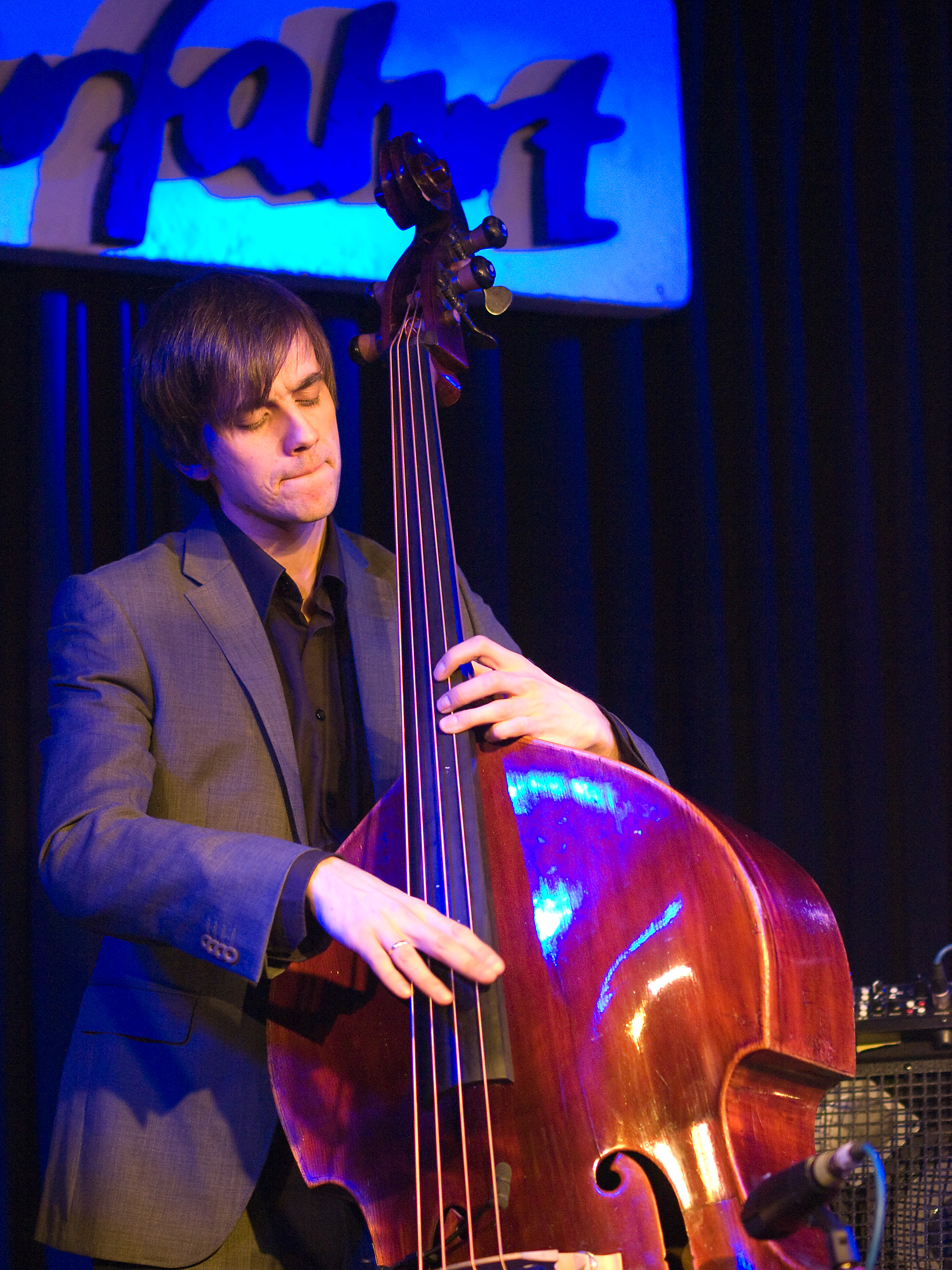
Audun Ellingsen with saxophonist Frøy Aagre live at the Jazz Club Unterfahrt 2010

- Nathan East (born 1955)
- Kyle Eastwood (born 1988)
- Jimmy Earl (born 1957)
- Cleveland Eaton (1939–2020)
- Kai Eckhardt (born 1961)
- Mark Egan (born 1951)
- Johannes Eick (born 1964)
- Mats Eilertsen (born 1975)
- Audun Ellingsen (born 1979)
- Audun Erlien (born 1967)
- Oytun Ersan (born 1978)
- Julian Euell (1929–2019)

== F ==
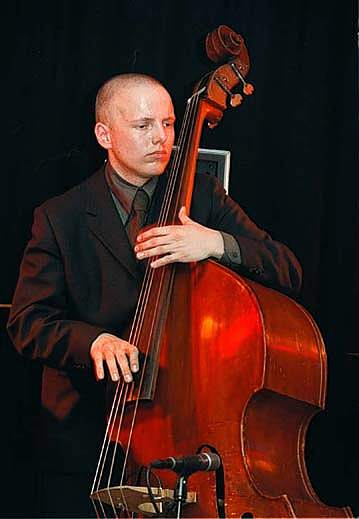
Ingebrigt Håker Flaten live in 2005, known for his work with artists like Ken Vandermark, Joe McPhee, Paal Nilssen-Love, Bugge Wesseltoft, Håvard Wiik and Ola Kvernberg

- Charles Fambrough (1950–2011)
- Addison Farmer (1928–1963)
- Malachi Favors (1927–2004)
- Hadrien Feraud (born 1984)
- Brent Fischer (born 1964)
- Arnold Fishkind (1919–1999)
- Trygve Waldemar Fiske (born 1987)
- Ingebrigt Håker Flaten (born 1971)
- Foley (born 1962)
- Joe Fonda (born 1954)
- Svein Folkvord (born 1967)
- Mo Foster (1944–2023)
- Herbie Flowers (1938–2024)
- Pops Foster (1892–1969)
- Henry Franklin (born 1940)
- David Friesen (born 1942)

== G ==
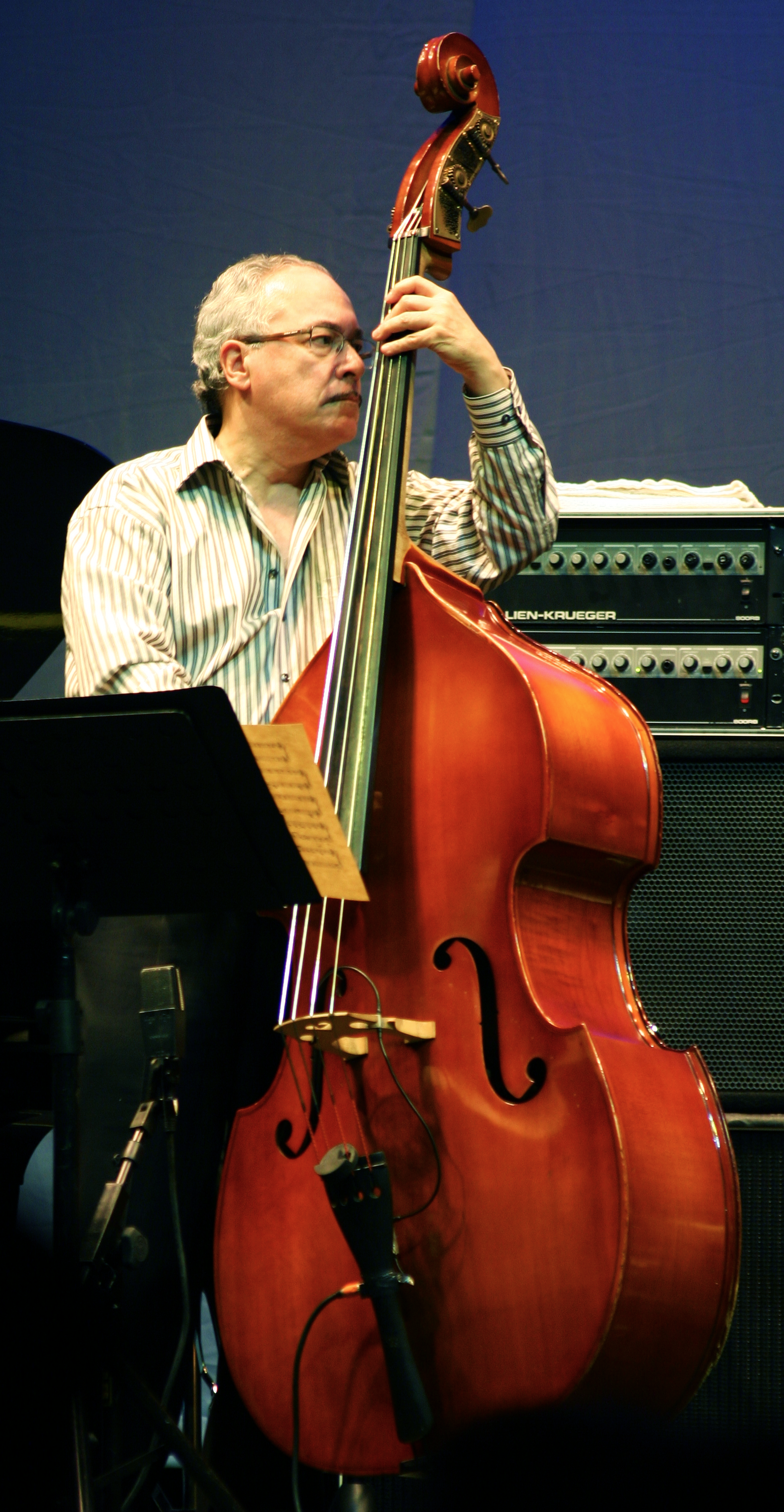
Eddie Gómez, who worked with the Bill Evans trio from 1966 to 1977

- Larry Gales (1936–1995)
- Renaud Garcia-Fons (born 1962)
- Juan Garcia-Herreros (born 1977)
- Ed Garland (1895–1980)
- Kåre Garnes (born 1954)
- Jimmy Garrison (1934–1976)
- Matthew Garrison (born 1970)
- Vivien Garry (1920–2008)
- Leonard Gaskin (1920–2009)
- Victor Gaskin (1934–2012)
- John Geggie
- Terje Gewelt (born 1960)
- Eddie Gibbs (1908–1994)
- John Giblin (1952–2023)
- Steve Gilmore (born 1943)
- Ole Amund Gjersvik (born 1963)
- Lincoln Goines (born 1953)
- Doc Goldberg
- Eddie Gómez (born 1944)
- Coleridge Goode (1914–2015)
- Calum Gourlay (born 1986)
- Sebastian Gramss (born 1966)
- Dave Green (born 1942)
- Larry Grenadier (born 1966)
- Drew Gress (born 1959)
- Tony Grey (born 1975)
- Henry Grimes (1935–2020)
- Duke Groner (1908–1992)
- Finn Guttormsen (born 1968)
- Ketil Gutvik (born 1972)
- Barry Guy (born 1947)
- Janek Gwizdala (born 1978)

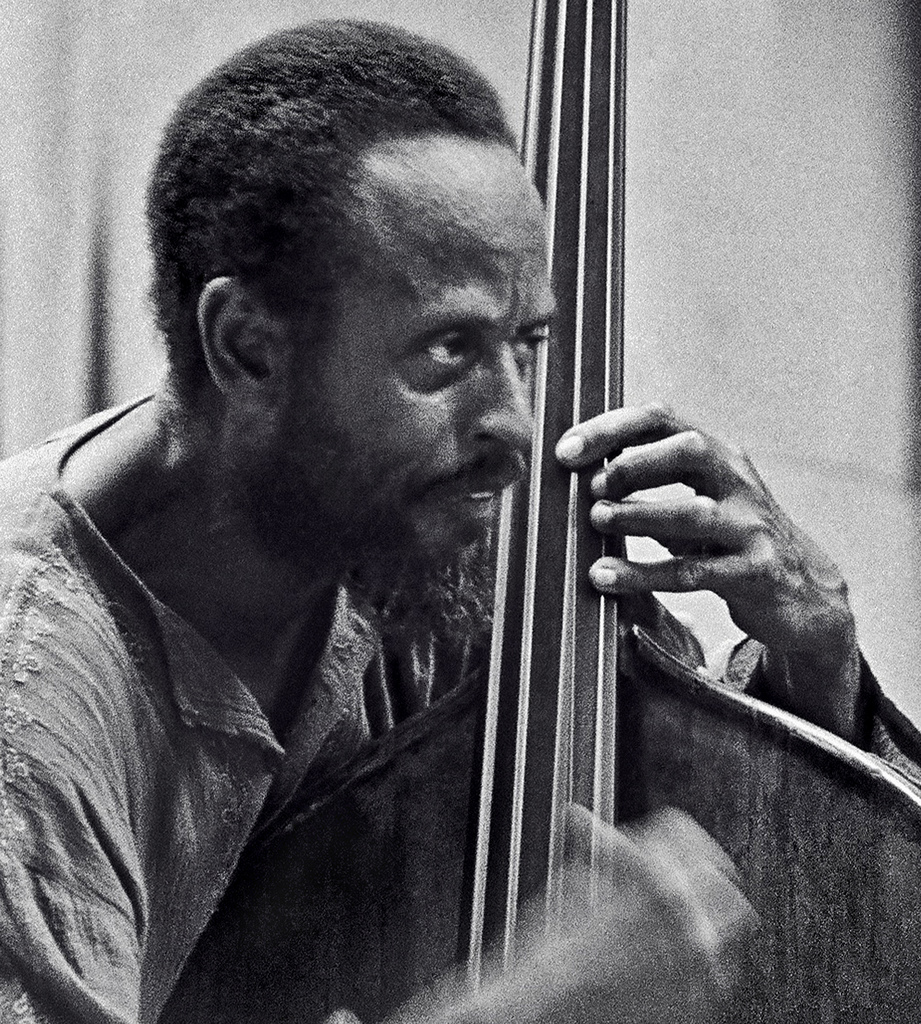
Percy Heath in New York City, pictured here in June 1977. He played with the Modern Jazz Quartet and also worked with Miles Davis, Dizzy Gillespie, Charlie Parker, Wes Montgomery and Thelonious Monk.

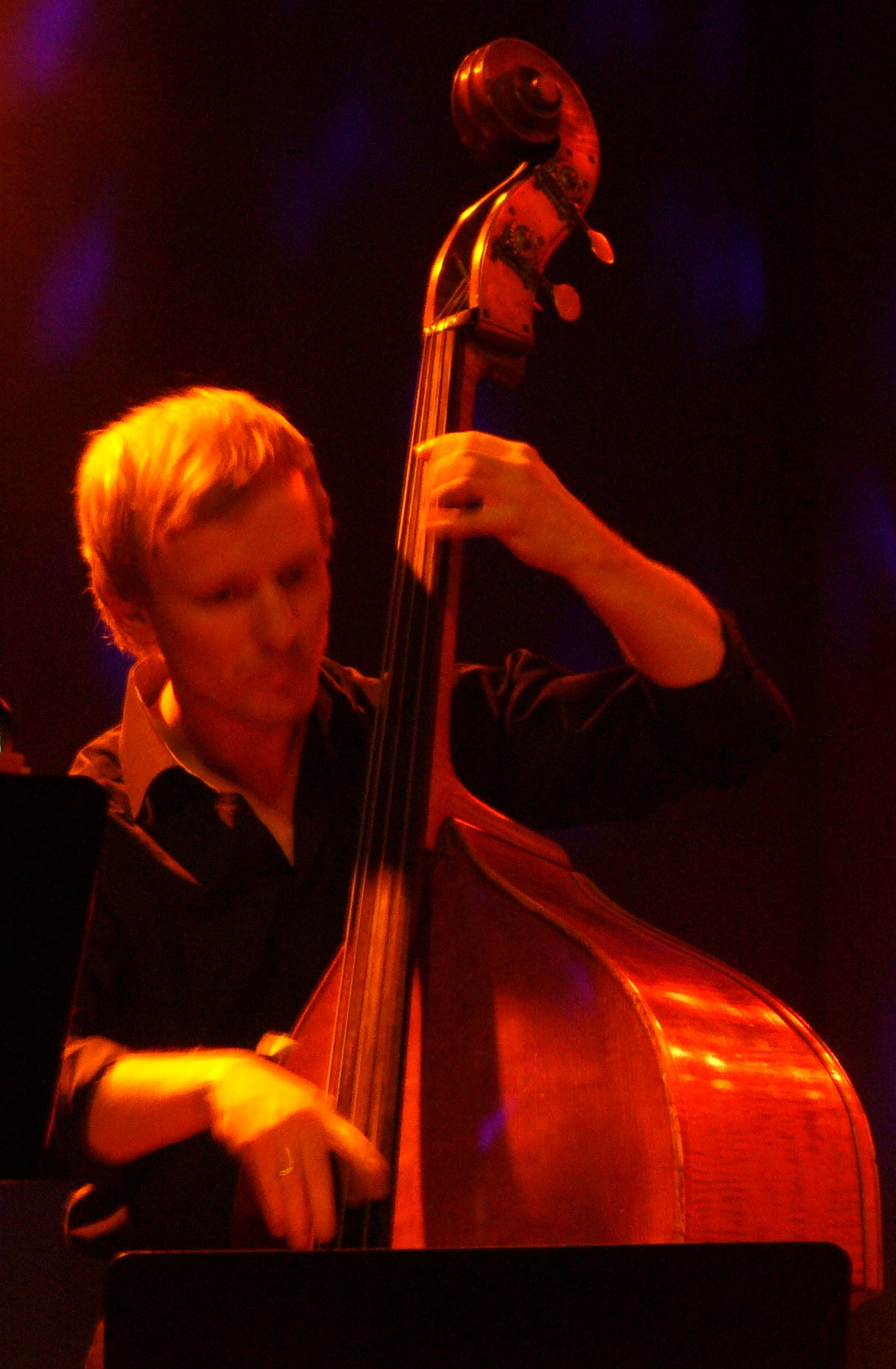
Sigurd Hole at Vossajazz 2014, known for his work with artists like Jon Eberson, Karl Seglem, Gisle Torvik, and within Eple Trio

== H ==
- Charlie Haden (1937–2014)
- Bob Haggart (1914–1998)
- Al Hall (1915–1988)
- Stuart Hamm (born 1960)
- Aslak Hartberg (born 1975)
- Jimmy Haslip (born 1951)
- Hellmut Hattler (born 1952)
- Michel Hatzigeorgiou (born 1961)
- Tim Hauff (born 1952)
- Nick Haywood (born 1961)
- Percy Heath (1923–2005)
- Spike Heatley (1933–2021)
- Mark Helias (born 1950)
- Jonas Hellborg (born 1958)
- Michael Henderson (1951–2022)
- Carlos Henriquez (born 1979)
- Shifty Henry (1921–1958)
- Svante Henryson (born 1963)
- Milt Hinton (1910–2000)
- Derrick Hodge (born 1979)
- Colin Hodgkinson (born 1945)
- Sigurd Hole (born 1981)
- Dave Holland (born 1946)
- Major Holley (1924–1990)
- Scotty Holt
- Fred Hopkins (1947–1999)
- Jim Hughart (born 1936)
- Spike Hughes (1908–1987)
- Stig Hvalryg (born 1960)

== I ==
- Dieter Ilg (born 1961)
- Peter Ind (1928–2021)
- Dennis Irwin (1951–2008)
- Jeff Irwin (born 1977)
- Ike Isaacs (1923–1981)
- Chuck Israels (born 1936)
- Carl Morten Iversen (born 1948)
- David Izenzon (1932–1979)

== J ==
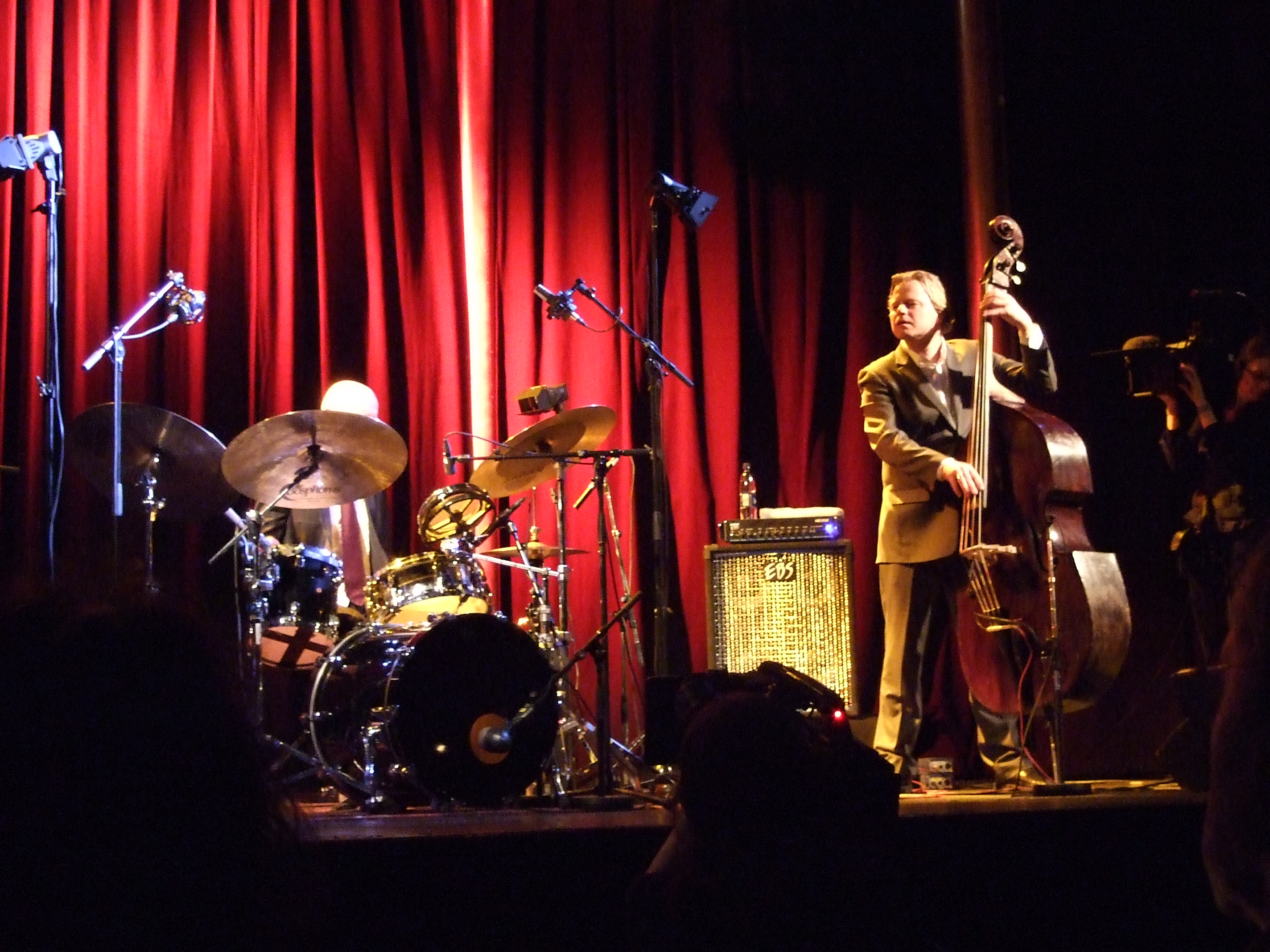
Harald Johnsen with Tord Gustavsen Trio in 2007, known for this collaboration and work with artists like Einar Iversen, Ditlef Eckhoff, Silje Nergaard, Frode Barth, Svein Olav Herstad, and within Køhn/Johansen Sextet

- Ali Jackson (1931–1987)
- Alvin Jackson
- Anthony Jackson (1952–2025)
- Chubby Jackson (1918–2003)
- Paul Jackson (1947–2021)
- Randy Jackson (born 1956)
- Kristian B. Jacobsen (born 1992)
- Michael Janisch (born 1979)
- Neil Jason
- Harald Johnsen (1970–2011)
- Alphonso Johnson (born 1951)
- Bill Johnson (1872–1972)
- Gordon Johnson (born 1952)
- Louis Johnson (1955–2015)
- Marc Johnson (born 1953)
- Darryl Jones (born 1961)
- Isham Jones (1894–1956)
- Percy Jones (born 1947)
- Sam Jones (1924–1981)
- José José (1948–2019)
- Anders Jormin (born 1957)
- Hans Otto Jung (1920–2009)

== K ==
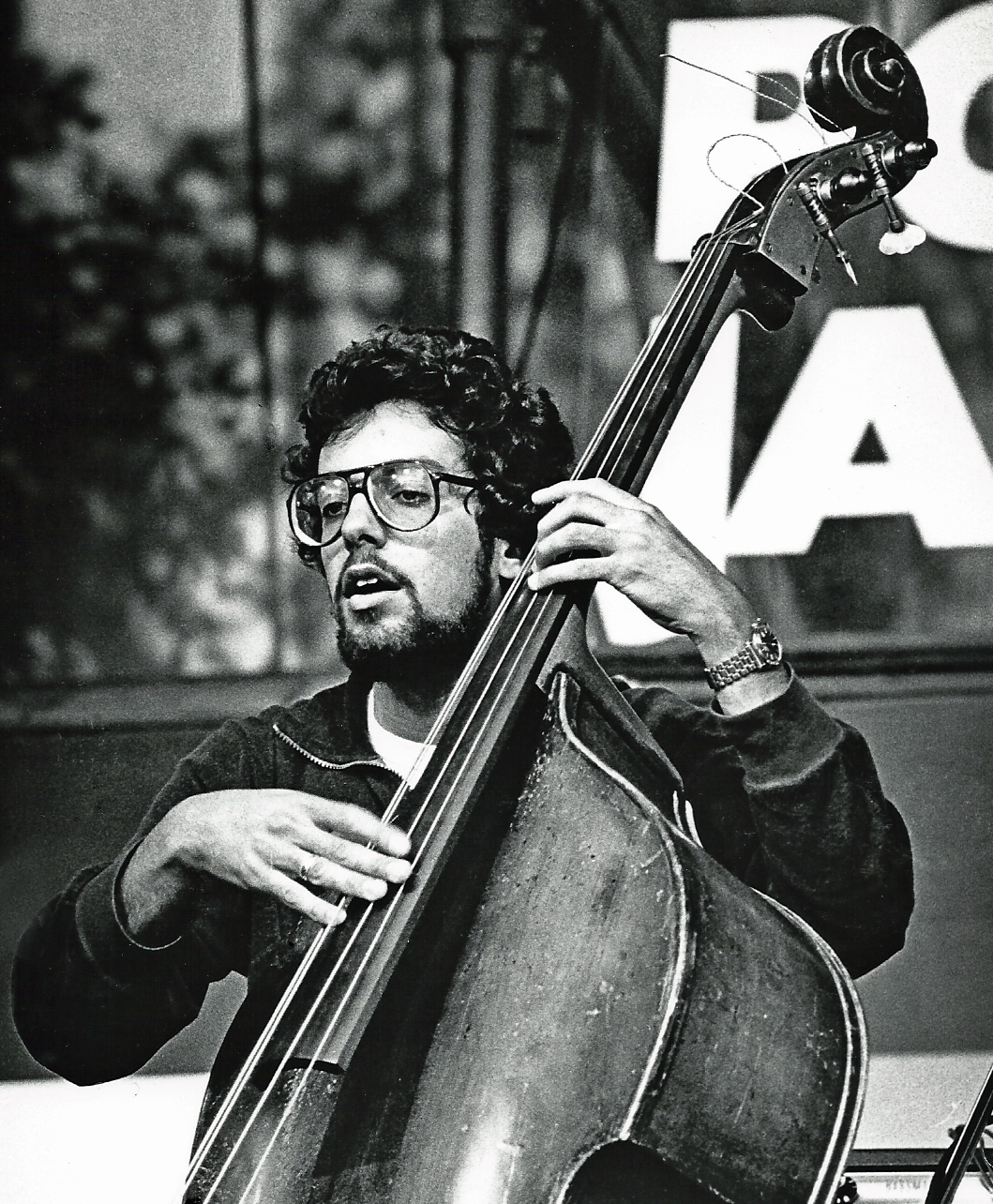
Larry Klein played with Freddie Hubbard, Carmen McRae, Joe Henderson, Bobby Hutcherson, Wayne Shorter, Herbie Hancock, Bobby McFerrin, and Dianne Reeves.

- Olaf Kamfjord (born 1962)
- Konrad Kaspersen (born 1948)
- Red Kelly (1927–2019)
- Tom Kennedy (born 1960)
- Norman Keenan (1916–1980)
- James King (1942–2012)
- Gary King (1947–2003)
- Mark King (born 1958)
- John Kirby (1908–1952)
- Andy Kirk (1898–1992)
- Bjørn Kjellemyr (1950–2025)
- Larry Klein (born 1956)
- Rob Kohler (born 1963)
- Kristin Korb
- Teddy Kotick (1928–1986)
- Peter Kowald (1944–2002)
- Ashley Kozak (c. 1930 – 2008)

== L ==
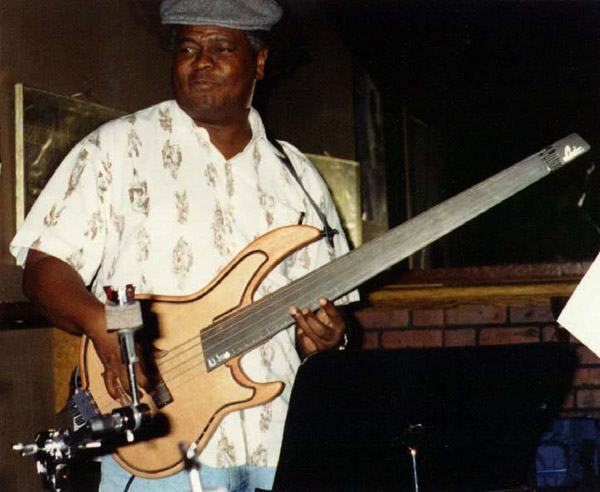
Abraham Laboriel played with Donald Fagen, Lee Ritenour, Dave Grusin, Stevie Wonder, Barbra Streisand, Al Jarreau, Billy Cobham, Ray Charles, Madonna, Paul Simon, Keith Green, Quincy Jones, Lalo Schifrin.

- Abraham Laboriel (born 1947)
- Scott LaFaro (1936–1961)
- Tim Landers (born 1956)
- Rick Laird (1941–2021)
- Jim Lanigan (1902–1983)
- Dominic Lash (born 1980)
- Chris Laurence (born 1949)
- James Leary (1946–2021)
- Ray Leatherwood (1914–1996)
- Jay Leonhart (born 1940)
- Jennifer Jane Leitham (born 1953)
- Jack Lesberg (1920–2005)
- Herbie Lewis (1941–2007)
- Julius Lind (born 1977)
- Wilbur Little (1928–1987)
- Joe Long (1941–2021)
- Israel "Cachao" López (1918–2008)
- Orlando "Cachaíto" López (1933–2009)
- Al Lucas (1912–1983)
- Curtis Lundy (born 1955)
- Brian Lawrence (born 1976)

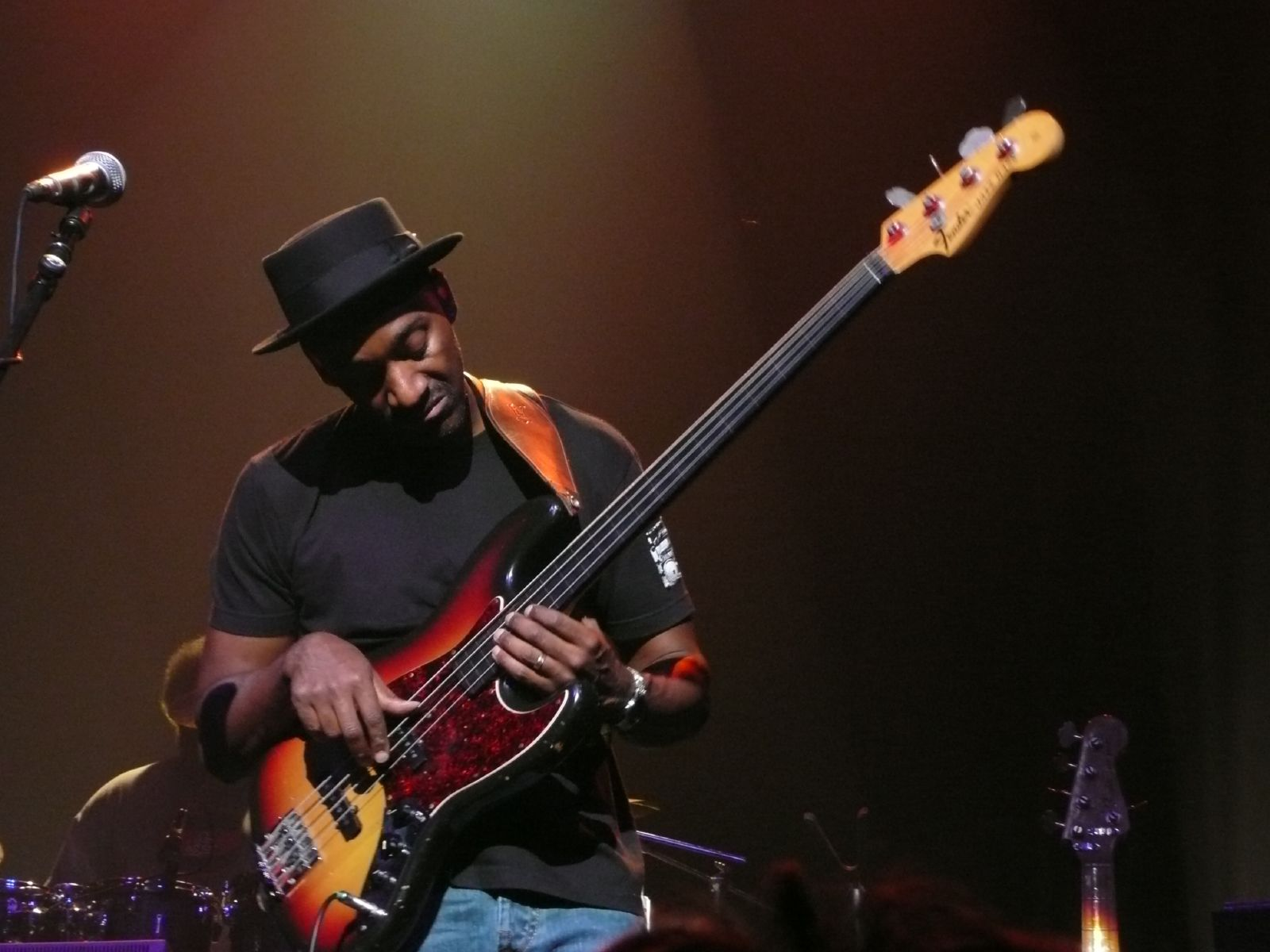
Marcus Miller worked with Miles Davis, Herbie Hancock, Wayne Shorter, McCoy Tyner, Frank Sinatra, Aretha Franklin, Grover Washington Jr.

== M ==
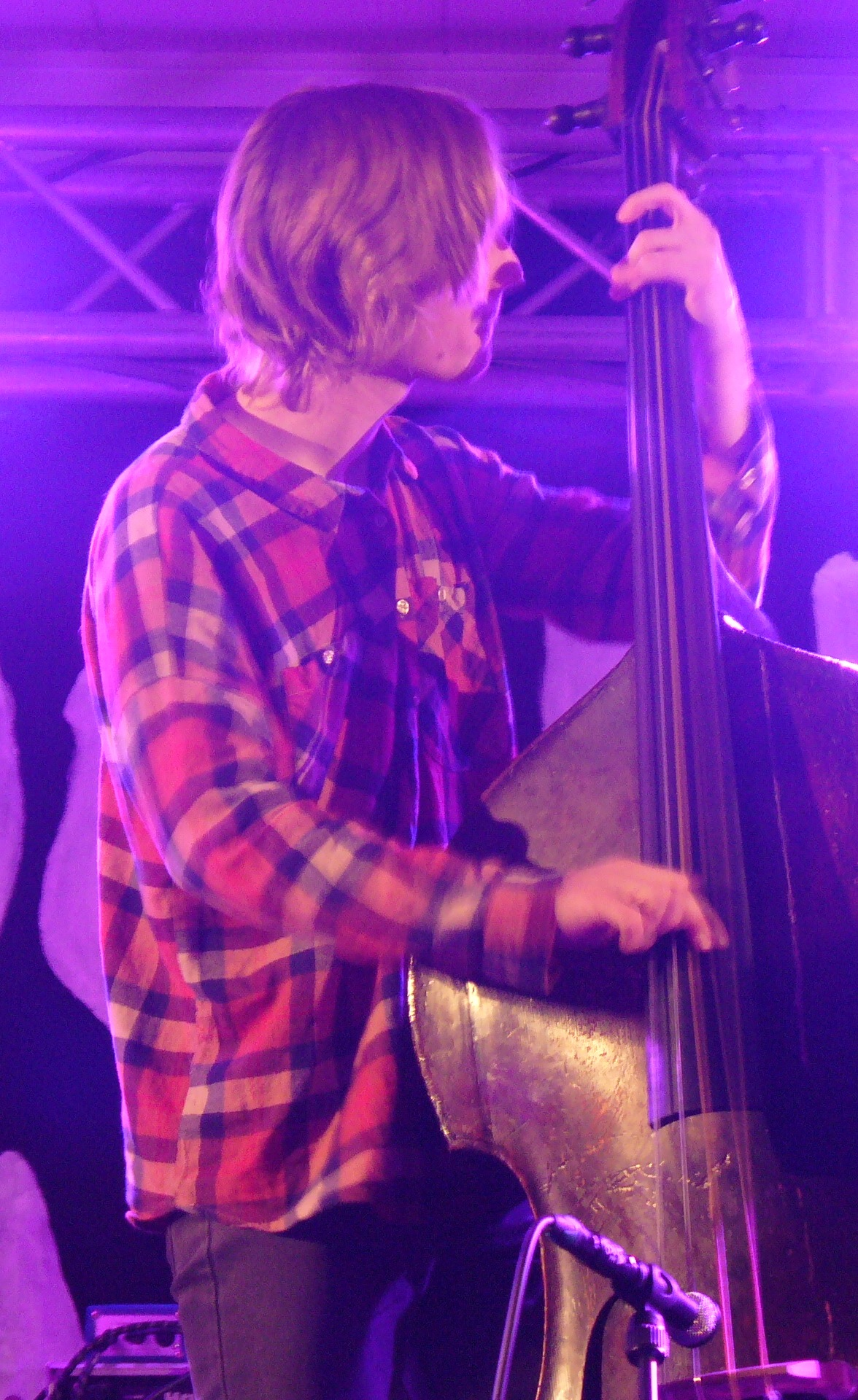
Magnus Skavhaug Nergaard within Monkey Plot at Vossajazz 2014, also known from work with artists like Mats Gustafsson, Christian Skår Winther, and Anja Lauvdal

- Bob Magnusson (born 1947)
- Michael Manring (born 1960)
- Wendell Marshall (1920–2002)
- Ron Mathewson (1944–2020)
- Per Mathisen (born 1969)
- Cecil McBee (born 1935)
- Christian McBride (born 1972)
- Ron McClure (born 1941)
- Andy McKee (born 1953)
- Al McKibbon (1919–2005)
- Sondre Meisfjord (born 1975)
- Chucho Merchán (born 1952)
- Jymie Merritt (1926–2020)
- Björn Meyer (born 1965)
- Pierre Michelot (1928–2005)
- Big Miller (Clarence Horatius Miller) (1922–1992)
- Harry Miller (1941–1983)
- Marcus Miller (born 1959)
- Charles Mingus (1922–1979)
- Red Mitchell (1927–1992)
- Whitey Mitchell (1932–2009)
- Guro Skumsnes Moe (born 1983)
- Charnett Moffett (born 1967)
- Joe Mondragon (1920–1987)
- Monk Montgomery (1921–1982)
- Glen Moore (born 1941)
- Michael Moore (born 1945)
- Al Morgan (1908–1974)
- Thomas Morgan (born 1981)
- Peck Morrison (1919–1988)
- George Morrow (1925–1992)
- John Mosher (1928–1998)
- Miles Mosley (born 1980)
- George Mraz (1944–2021)
- Jo Berger Myhre (born 1984)

== N ==
- Buell Neidlinger (1936–2018)
- Magnus Skavhaug Nergaard (born 1989)
- Rune Nergaard (born 1983)
- Steve Novosel (born 1940)
- Andy Nevala (born 1972)

== O ==
- Jordan O'Connor (born 1972)
- Patrick O'Hearn (born 1954)
- Linda Oh (born 1984)
- Ugonna Okegwo (born 1962)
- Darek Oleszkiewicz (born 1963)
- Eivind Opsvik (born 1973)
- John Ore (1933–2014)
- Endea Owens (born 1988 or 1989)

== P ==
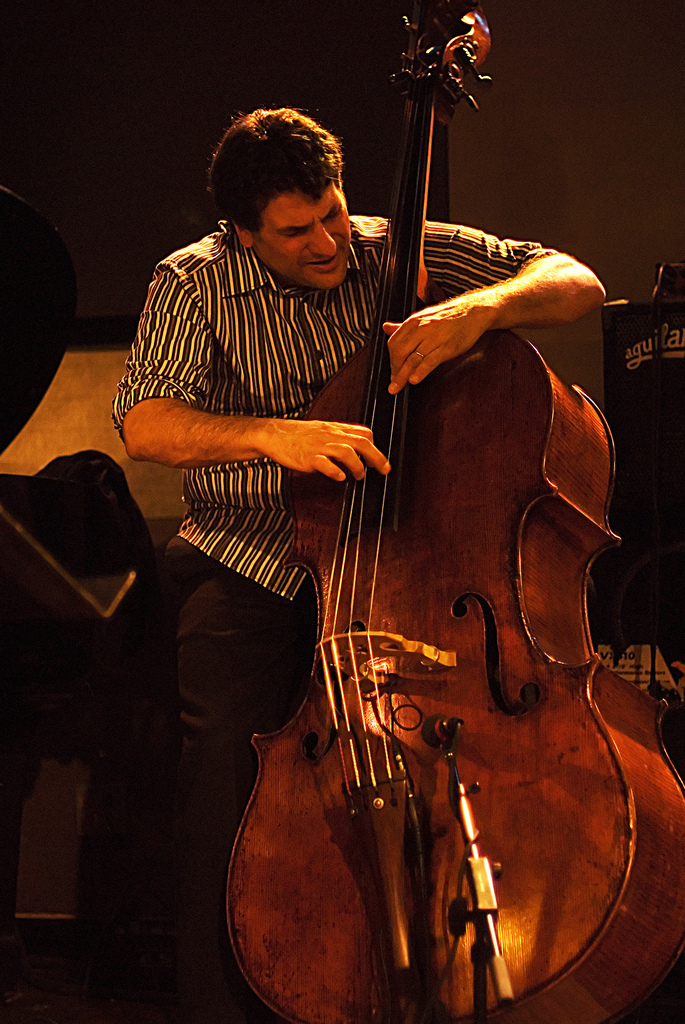
John Patitucci, who plays both electric bass and double bass at a virtuoso level, has worked with Chick Corea, Herbie Hancock, Wayne Shorter, Stan Getz, Wynton Marsalis, Joshua Redman, Michael Brecker, Randy Brecker, Freddie Hubbard, McCoy Tyner, and Tony Williams.

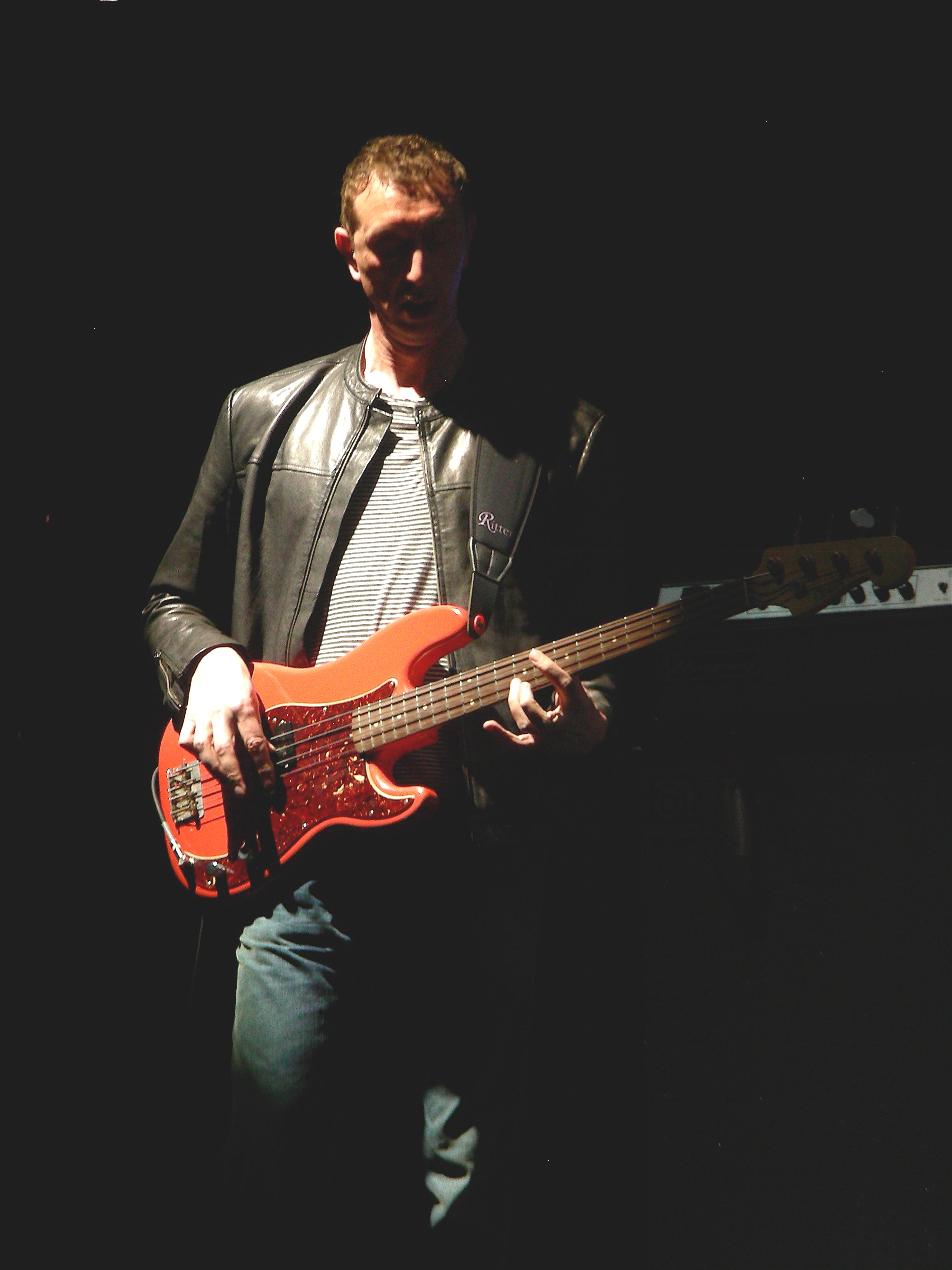
Pino Palladino has played with Roy Hargrove, Steve Gadd, Tony Bennett, Manu Katché.

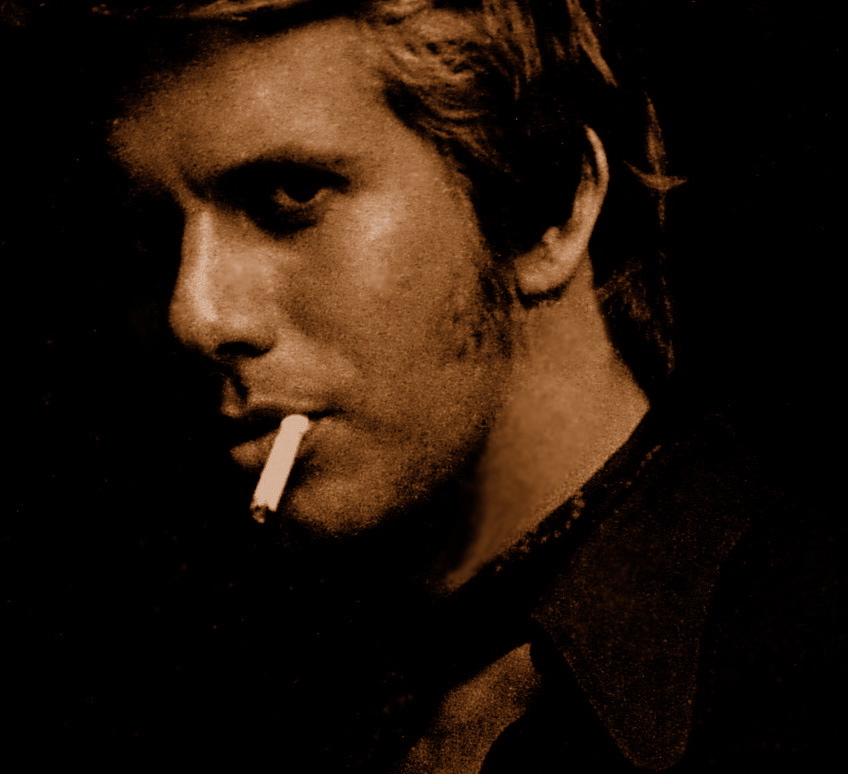
Pino Presti has played with Gerry Mulligan, Quincy Jones, Stéphane Grappelli, Astor Piazzolla, Aldemaro Romero.

- Walter Page (1900–1957)
- Caterina Palazzi (born 1982)
- Pino Palladino (born 1957)
- Truck Parham (1911–2002)
- William Parker (born 1952)
- Jaco Pastorius (1951–1987)
- Johnny Pate (born 1923)
- John Patitucci (born 1959)
- Mario Pavone (1940–2021)
- Alcide "Slow Drag" Pavageau (1888–1969)
- Gary Peacock (1935–2020)
- Niels-Henning Ørsted Pedersen (1946–2005)
- Aladár Pege (1939–2006)
- Ralph Peña (1927–1969)
- Gene Perla (born 1940)
- Oscar Pettiford (1922–1960)
- Barre Phillips (1934–2024)
- Martin Pizzarelli (born 1963)
- Lonnie Plaxico (born 1960)
- Terry Plumeri (1944–2016)
- Robert Popwell (1950–2017)
- Tommy Potter (1918–1988)
- Pino Presti (born 1943)
- Rocco Prestia (1951–2020)
- Jodi Proznick (born 1975)

== R ==
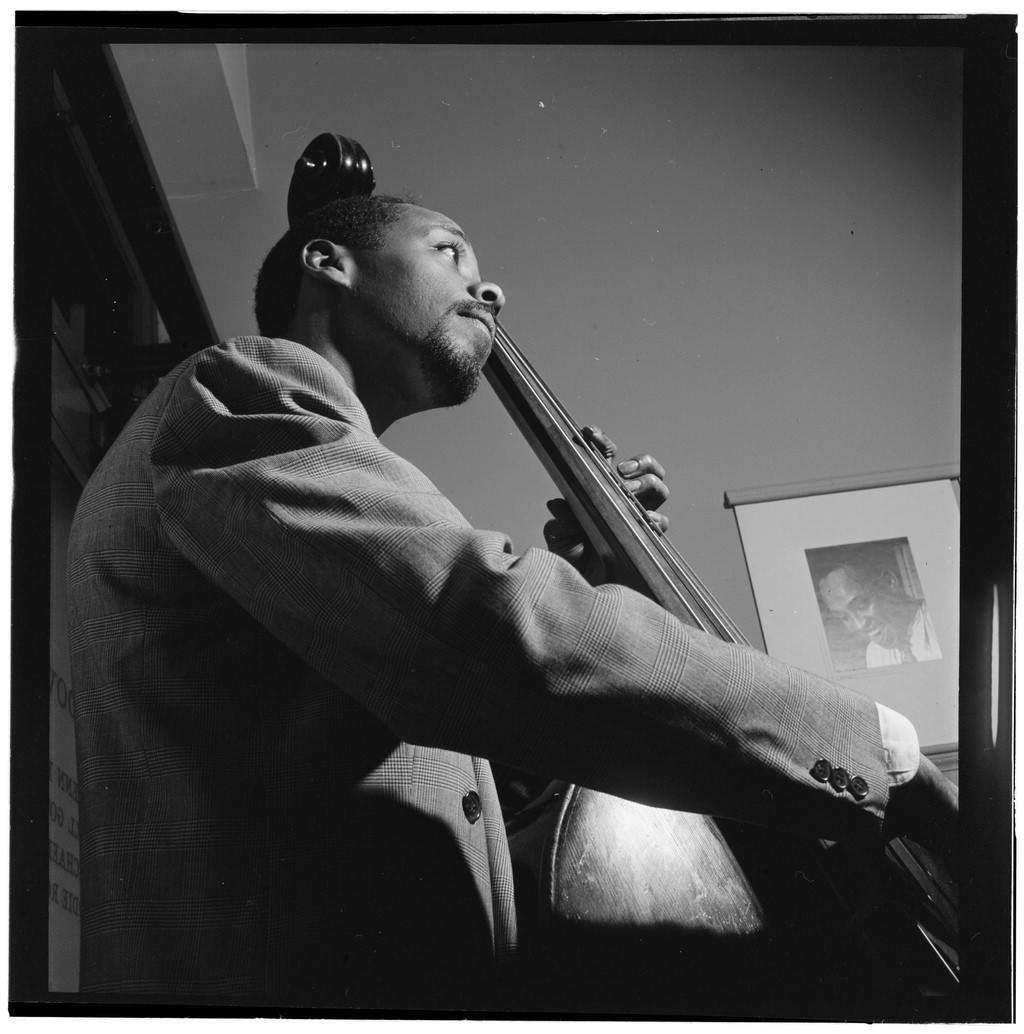
John Simmons played with Roy Eldridge, Benny Goodman, Cootie Williams, Louis Armstrong, Duke Ellington, Erroll Garner, Ben Webster, Billie Holiday, Coleman Hawkins, Don Byas, Benny Carter, Ella Fitzgerald, Thelonious Monk.

- Chuck Rainey (born 1940)
- Steinar Raknes (born 1975)
- Gene Ramey (1913–1984)
- Hugo Rasmussen (1941-2015)
- Nat Reeves (born 1955)
- Rufus Reid (born 1944)
- Marius Reksjø (born 1973)
- Eric Revis (born 1967)
- Jim Richardson (born 1941)
- Larry Ridley (born 1937)
- Georg Riedel (1934–2024)
- Steve Rodby (born 1954)
- Reuben Rogers (born 1974)
- Howard Rumsey (1917–2015)
- Daryl Runswick (born 1946)
- Curley Russell (1917–1986)

== S ==
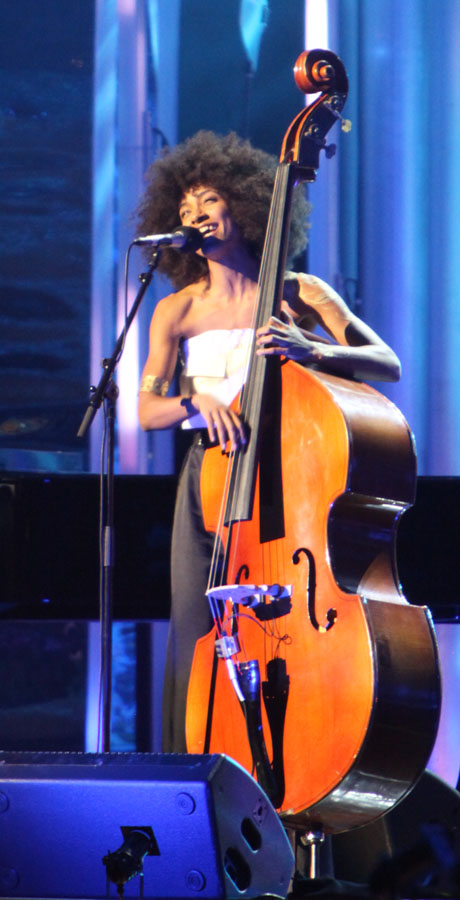
Esperanza Spalding (born October 18, 1984) is an American jazz bassist, cellist and singer, who draws upon many genres in her own compositions. She has won four Grammy Awards, including the Grammy Award for Best New Artist at the 53rd Grammy Awards, making her the first jazz artist to win the award.

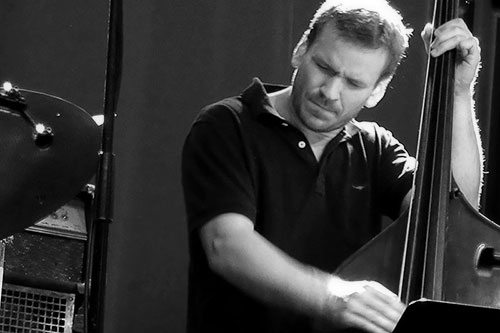
Jon Rune Strøm with Paal Nilssen-Love at Large Unit in 2015. Strøm is known from collaborations with the likes of Kjersti Stubø and Frode Gjerstad.

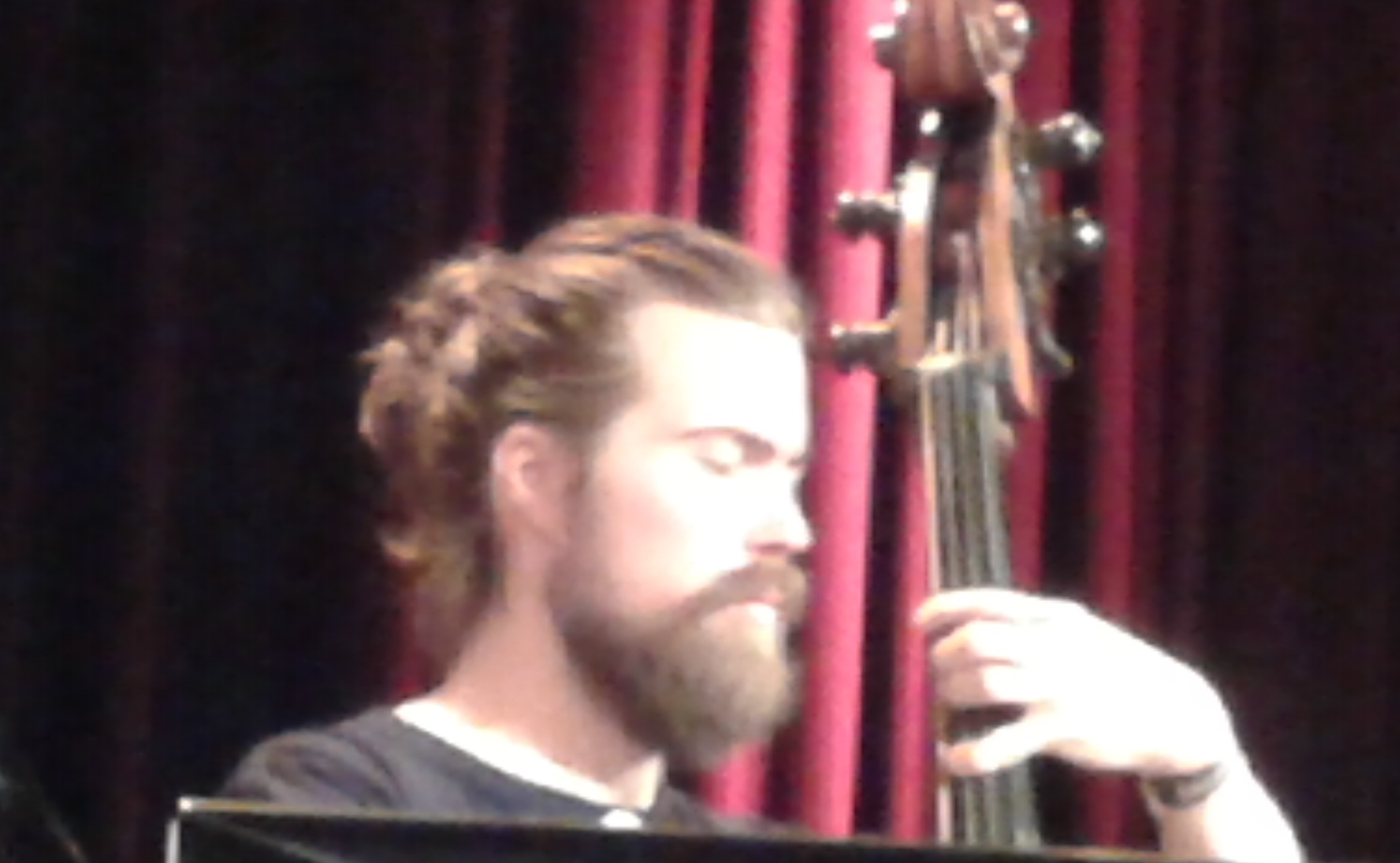
Christian Meaas Svendsen with Ayumi Tanaka Trio at Nattjazz 2015, also known as part of Andrea Kvintett, Duplex and Mopti

- Harvie S (born 1948)
- Igor Saavedra (born 1966)
- Eddie Safranski (1918–1974)
- Ole Marius Sandberg (born 1975)
- Joe Sanders (born 1984)
- Jacky Samson (1943–2012)
- Fernando Saunders (born 1957)
- Tony Saunders
- Patrick Scales (born 1965)
- Tony Scherr
- Lynn Seaton (born 1957)
- Clarence Seay (born 1957)
- Karl E. H. Seigfried (born 1973)
- Pat Senatore (born 1935)
- Avery Sharpe (born 1954)
- Arvell Shaw (1923–2002)
- David Shapiro (1952–2011)
- Todd Sickafoose (born 1974)
- Alan Silva (born 1939)
- John Simmons (1918–1979)
- Andy Simpkins (1932–1999)
- Len Skeat (1937–2021)
- Audun Skorgen (born 1967)
- Baard Slagsvold (born 1963)
- Carson Smith (1931–1997)
- Putter Smith (born 1941)
- Rhonda Smith
- Sean Smith (born 1965)
- Teddy Smith (1932–1979)
- Esperanza Spalding (born 1984)
- Victor Sproles (1927–2005)
- Neal Starkey
- Leroy "Slam" Stewart (1914–1987)
- Øyvind Storesund (born 1975)
- Ben Street
- Jon Rune Strøm (born 1985)
- Neil Stubenhaus (born 1953)
- Ted Sturgis (1913–1995)
- Ike Sturm (born 1978)
- Christian Meaas Svendsen (born 1988)
- Neil Swainson (born 1955)
- Steve Swallow (born 1940)

== T ==
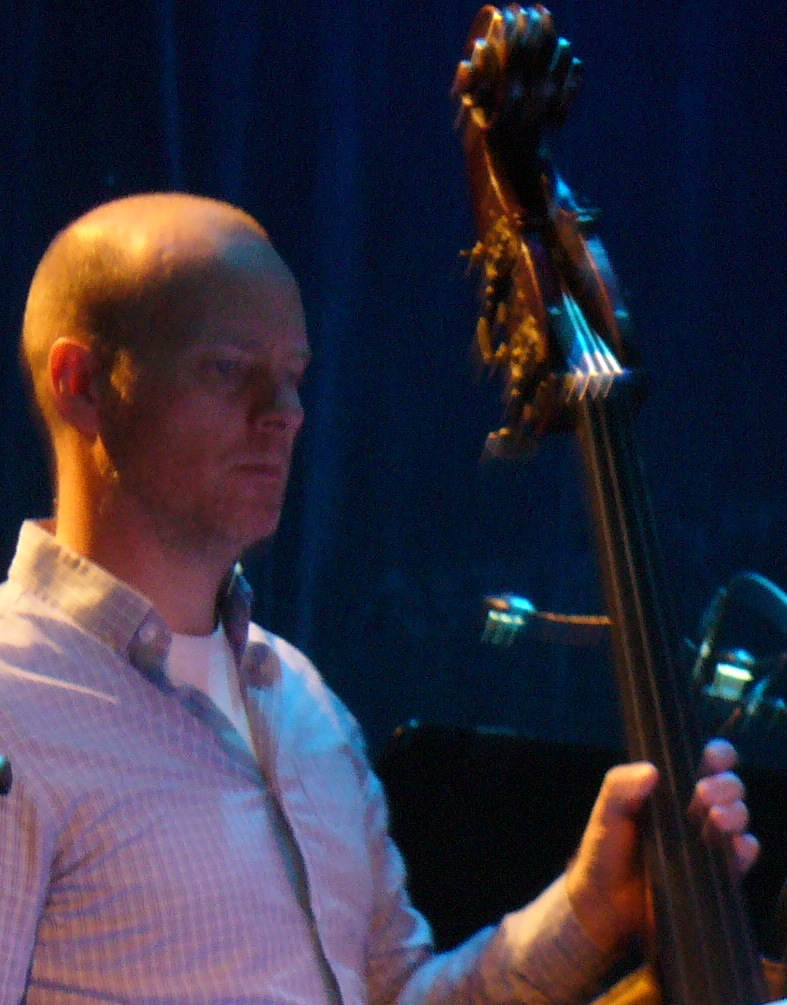
Magne Thormodsæter in Bergen 2014, known for his work with artists like Terje Rypdal, Karin Krog, John Surman, Ståle Storløkken, Paolo Vinaccia, and within Bergen Big Band

- Jamaaladeen Tacuma (born 1956)
- Carl Frederick Tandberg (1910–1988)
- Sandra Riley Tang (born 1990)
- Ares Tavolazzi (born 1948)
- Billy Taylor (1906–1986)
- Dylan Taylor (born 1960)
- Henri Texier (born 1945)
- Kostas Theodorou (born 1965)
- Danny Thompson (1939–2025)
- Don Thompson (born 1940)
- Magne Thormodsæter (born 1973)
- Wayman Tisdale (1964–2009)
- Jannick Top (born 1947)
- Brian Torff (born 1954)
- Frank Tusa (born 1947)
- Bjørnar Kaldefoss Tveite (born 1987)

== U ==
- Sigurd Ulveseth (born 1953)
- Phil Upchurch (1941–2025)

== V ==
- Ole Morten Vågan (born 1979)
- Hein van de Geyn (born 1956)
- Terje Venaas (1947–2025)
- Mads Vinding (born 1948)
- Leroy Vinnegar (1928–1999)
- Miroslav Vitous (born 1947)
- Louis Vola (1902–1990)

== W ==
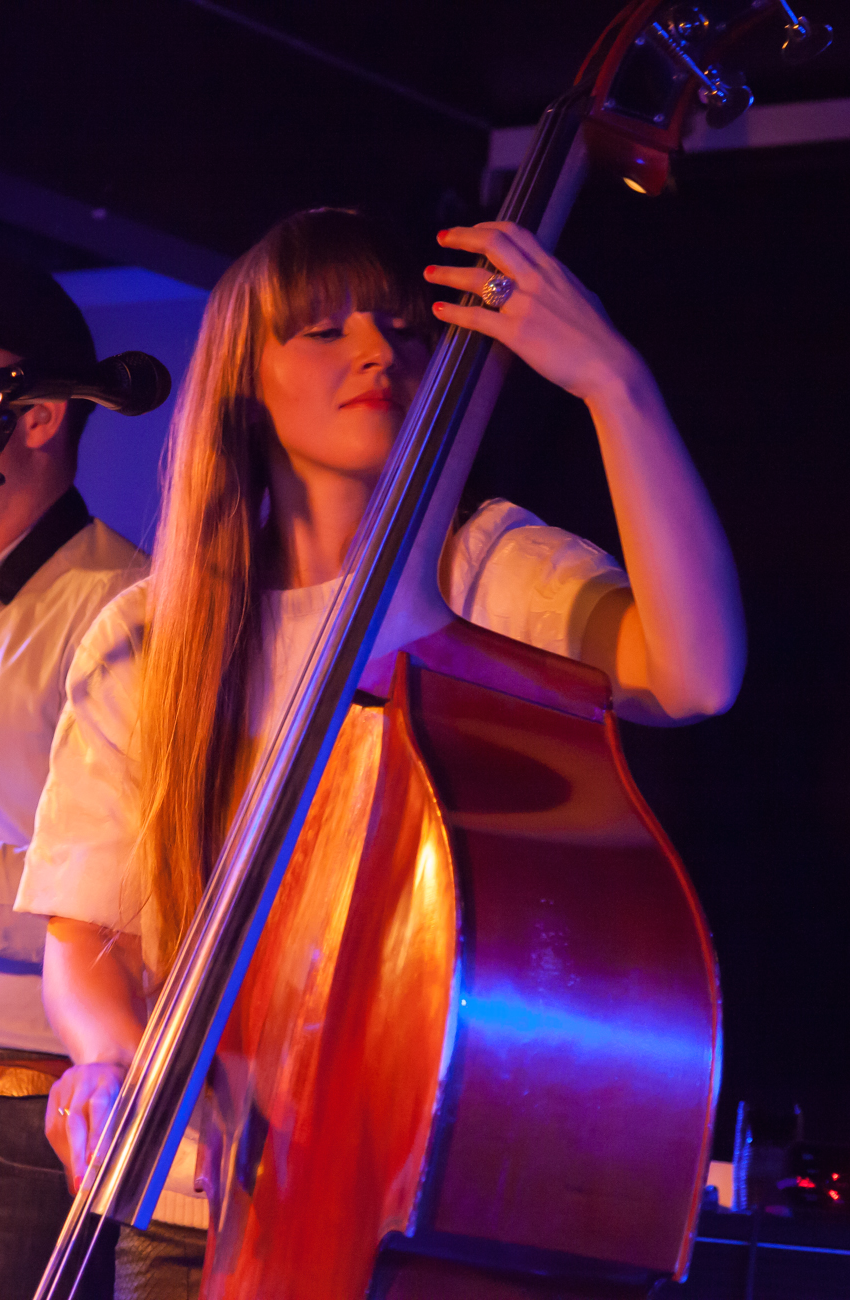
Ellen Andrea Wang live in 2013. Wang is known from collaborations with pianist Dag Arnesen, Norwegian Song 3 (2010), within the band Pixel, Reminder (2012) and We Are All Small Pixels (2013), as solo artist Diving (2014) and as recipient of the 2015 Kongsberg Jazz Award. (Photo by Tore Pettersen)

- Ellen Andrea Wang (born 1986)
- Wilbur Ware (1923–1979)
- Butch Warren (1939–2013)
- Peter Washington (born 1964)
- Rob Wasserman (1952–2016)
- Doug Watkins (1934–1962)
- Hank Wayland (1906–1983)
- Eberhard Weber (born 1940)
- Sid Weiss (1914-1994)
- Rodney Whitaker (born 1968)
- Andrew White (also sax, oboe) (1942–2020)
- Chris White (1936−2014)
- Tal Wilkenfeld (born 1986)
- Buster Williams (born 1942)
- David "Happy" Williams (born 1946)
- Gary Willis (born 1957)
- Quinn Wilson (1908–1978)
- Ben Wolfe (born 1962)
- Chris Wood (born 1969)
- Jimmy Woode (1926–2005)
- Victor Lemonte Wooten (born 1964)
- Reggie Workman (born 1937)
- Eugene Wright (1923–2020)
- Herman Wright (1930–1997)

== Y ==
- Walt Yoder (1914–1978)
- Dave Young (born 1940)
- Eldee Young (1936–2007)
- Bob Ysaguirre (1897–1982)

== Z ==
- Per Zanussi (born 1977)
- Chester Zardis (1900–1990)
- Stuart Zender (born 1974)

== See also ==
- List of contemporary classical double bass players
- List of jazz musicians
