= 1988 in Norwegian music =

The following is a list of notable events and releases of the year 1988 in Norwegian music.

== Events ==
=== March ===
- 25 – The 15th Vossajazz started in Vossavangen, Norway (March 25 – 27).

=== May ===
- 25 – The 16th Nattjazz started in Bergen, Norway (May 25 – June 8).

=== June ===
- 25 – The 19th Kalvøyafestivalen started at Kalvøya near by Oslo (June 25 – 26).
- 26 – Leonard Cohen performed a concert at Kalvøya, Bærum (Kalvøyafestivalen).

=== September ===
- 9 – The 1st Notodden Blues Festival started in Notodden (September 9 – 11).

== Albums released ==
=== Unknown date ===
G

Jan Garbarek

- Legend Of The Seven Dreams (ECM Records)

S

Thorgeir Stubø

- The End Of A Tune (Cadence Jazz Records), with Art Farmer and Doug Raney

== Deaths ==
January

- 9 – Peter L. Rypdal, fiddler and famous traditional folk music composer (born 1909).

July

- 1 – Robert Riefling, classical pianist and music teacher (born 1911).

== Births ==
February

- 5 – Fredrik Luhr Dietrichson, jazz upright bassist.
- 15 – Ragnhild Hemsing, classical and traditional folk violinist.
- 26 – Christian Meaas Svendsen, jazz upright bassist and composer.

April

- 12 – Tone Damli Aaberge, singer.

May

- 7 – David Aleksander Sjølie, jazz guitarist, Mopti.
- 9 – Fredrik Rasten, guitarist, improviser, and composer.

July

- 31 – Andreas Wildhagen, jazz drummer.

August

- 12 – Chriss Rune Olsen Angvik, rhythm & blues guitarist and vocalist.
- 17 - Natalie Sandtorv, jazz singer, percussionist, and electronica artist.

Unknown date

- Jan Martin Gismervik, jazz drummer.

== See also ==
- 1988 in Norway
- Music of Norway
- Norway in the Eurovision Song Contest 1988
