= Arnautović =

- Pronunciation: IPA: [arnǎutovitɕ]
- Language: Serbo-Croatian

Origin
- Language: Ottoman Turkish
- Meaning: 'Albanian'

Other names
- Variant form: Arnautić

Arnautović (Serbian Cyrillic: Арнаутовић, pronounced [arnǎutovitɕ]) is a Serbo-Croatian surname derived from Arnaut, the Ottoman Turkish ethnonym for Albanians. At least 254 individuals with the surname died at the Jasenovac concentration camp. Notable people with the name include:

- Ilija Arnautović (1924–2009), Yugoslav and Serbian architect
- Marko Arnautović (born 1989), Austrian football player
- Nemanja Arnautović (born 1990), Serbian basketball player
- Tijana Arnautović (born 1986), Miss World Canada 2004
- Zlatan Arnautović (born 1956), Yugoslav and Serbian handball player and coach

== See also ==
- Arnautoff, surname of the same origin in Russian
- Arnautovići
