= Arnautoff =

Arnautoff is a transcription of the Russian surname Arnautov derived from Arnaut, the Ottoman Turkish ethnonym for Albanians. Russian-language fminie form: Arnautova. Notable people with the surnames Arnautoff and Arnautov/Arnautova include:

- Andrew Arnautov, American and Ukrainian jazz musician, music producer, virtuoso jazz bassist
- Anna Arnautova (born 1 June 2004) is a Ukrainian diver
- Peter Arnautoff (born 1951), American soccer goalkeeper
- Victor Arnautoff (1896–1979), Russian-American painter and professor
- Vladimir Arnautov, Soviet and Moldovan mathematician

== See also ==
- Arnautović
