= Arnautovići =

- Village
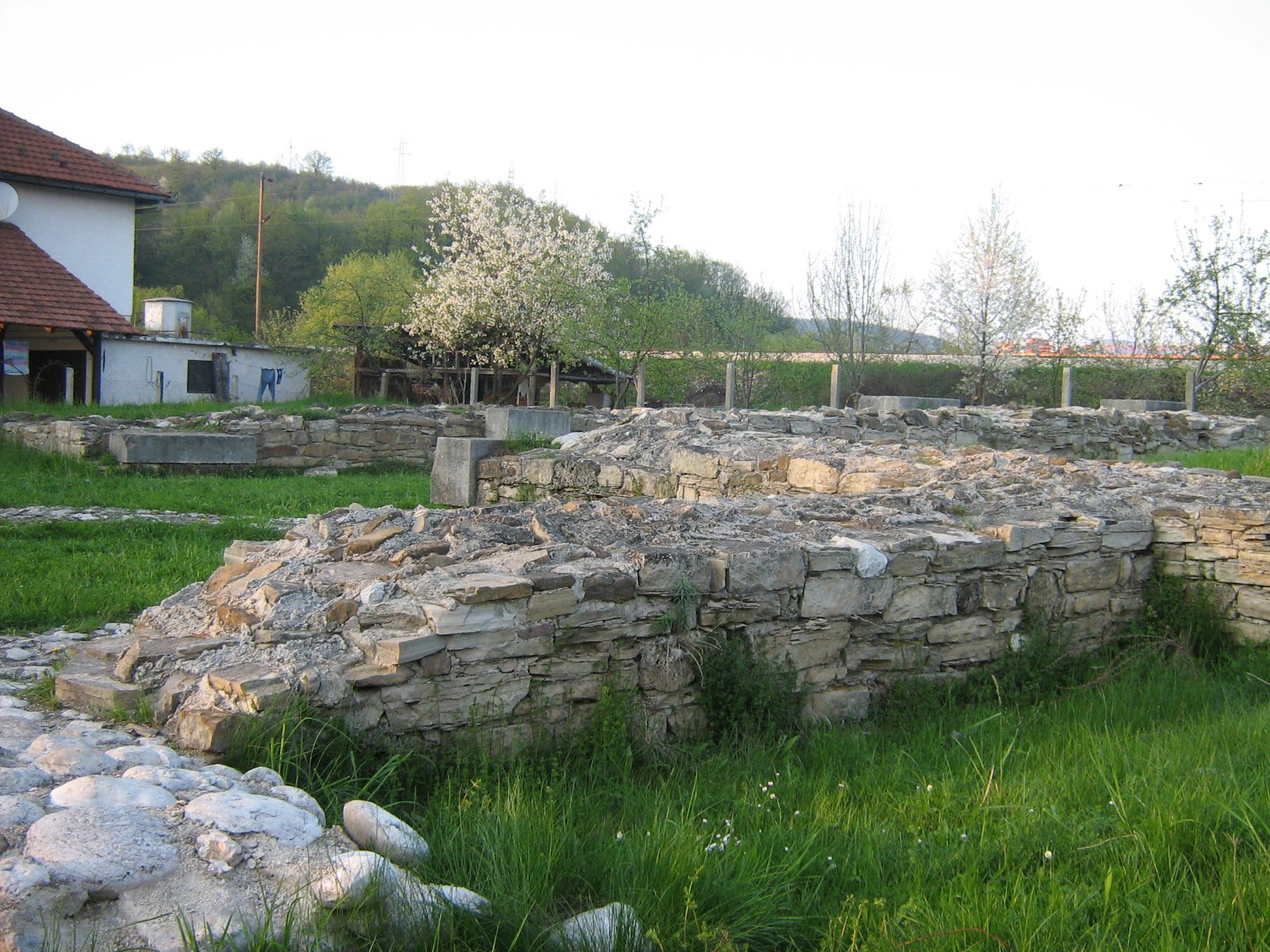
- Remains of medieval church in Mile

- Location within Bosnia and Herzegovina
- Coordinates: 44.0066°N 18.1628°E
- Country: Bosnia and Herzegovina
- Entity: Federation of Bosnia and Herzegovina
- Canton: Zenica-Doboj
- Municipality: Visoko

Area
  - Total: 0.25 sq mi (0.64 km^{2})

Population (2013)
  - Total: 466
  - Density: 1,900/sq mi (730/km^{2})
- Time zone: UTC+1 (CET)
  - Summer (DST): UTC+2 (CEST)

Arnautovići is a village in the municipality of Visoko, Bosnia and Herzegovina.

It is the location of Mile burial place of Bosnian kings.

== Demographics ==
According to the 2013 census, its population was 466.

Ethnicity in 2013
Ethnicity	Number	Percentage
Bosniaks	454	97.4%
other/undeclared	12	2.6%
Total	466	100%
