= Christian Meaas Svendsen =

Norwegian jazz bassist

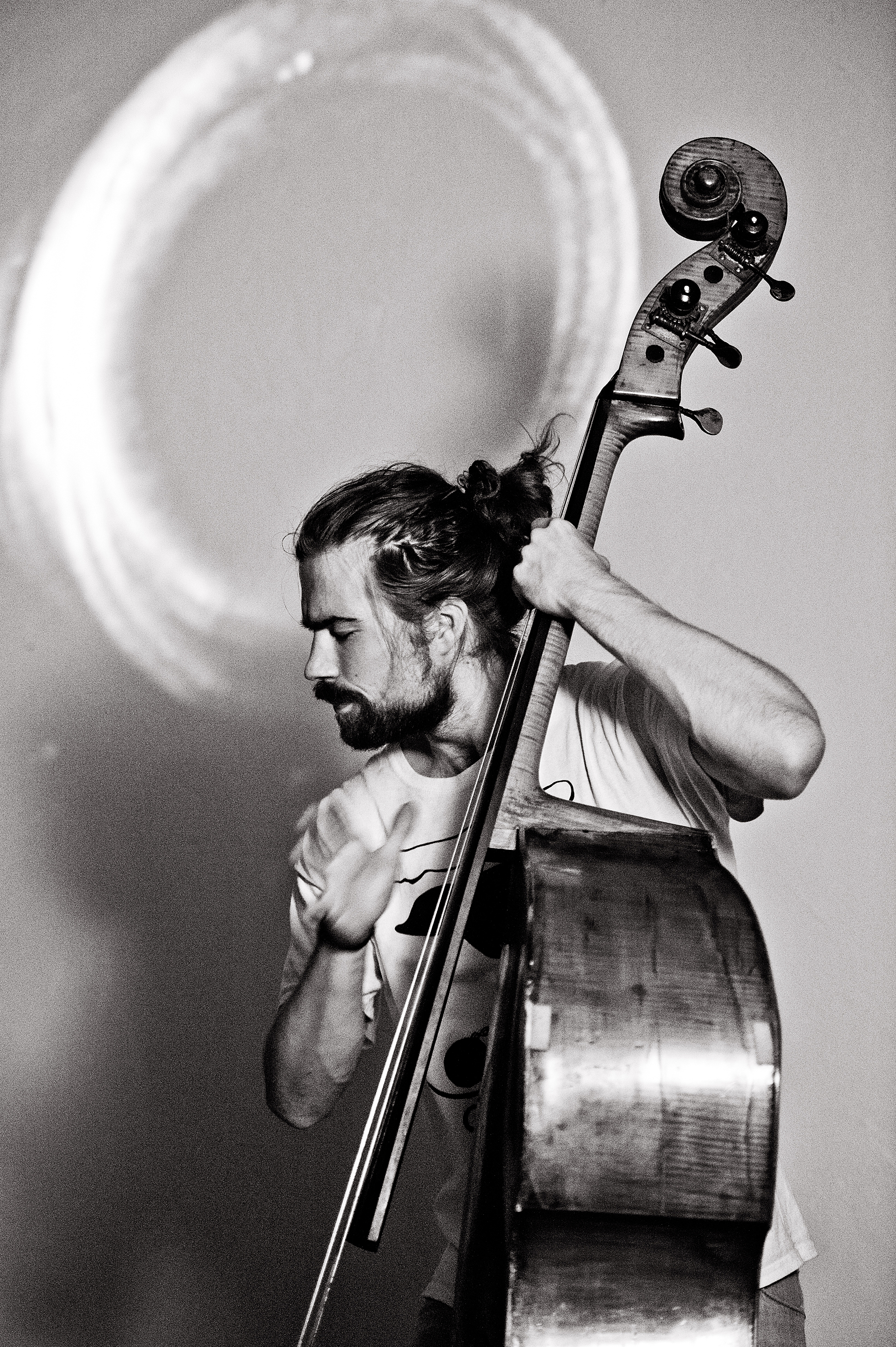
- Meaas Svendsen with Momentum at Spriten Kunsthall, Skien, 10 September 2015. Photo: Ketil Hardy

Background information
- Born: 26 February 1988 (age 38); Kongsberg, Buskerud, Norway
- Genres: Jazz
- Occupations: Musician, composer
- Instruments: Double bass, bass guitar
- Labels: NorCD, Jazzland, Nakama
- Website: christianmeaassvendsen.com

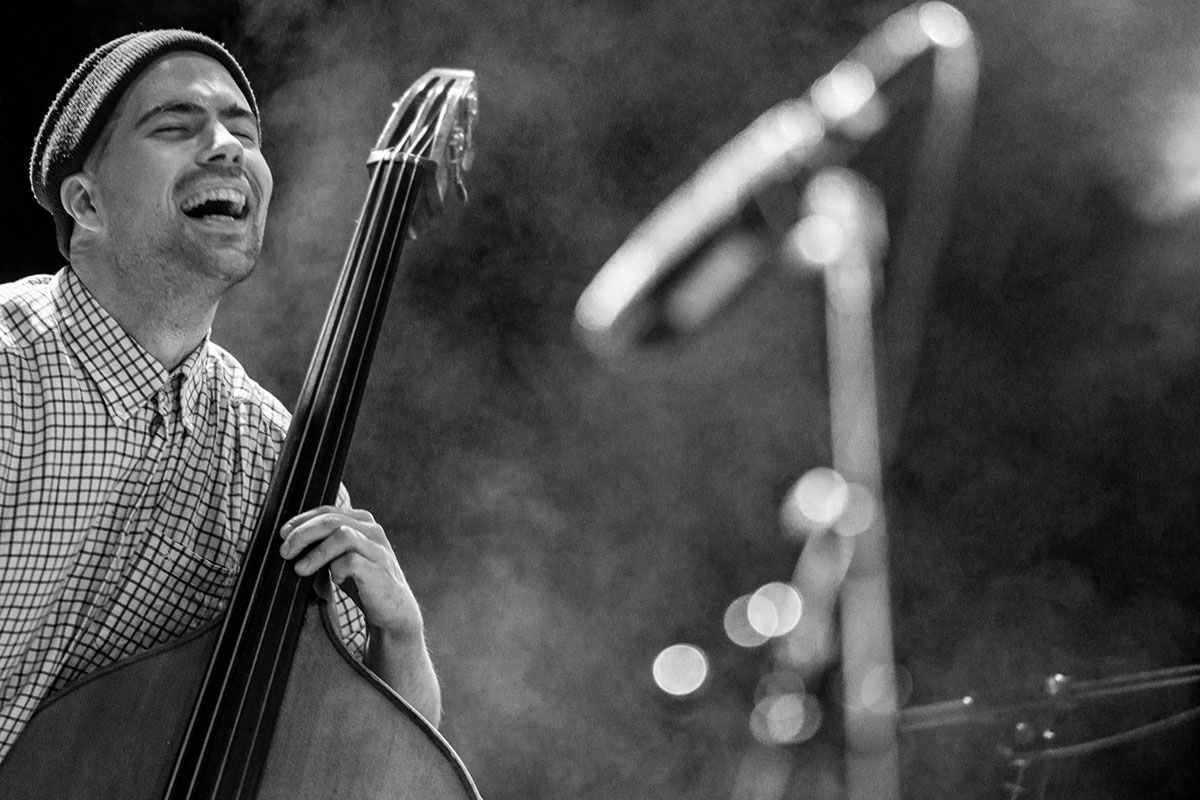
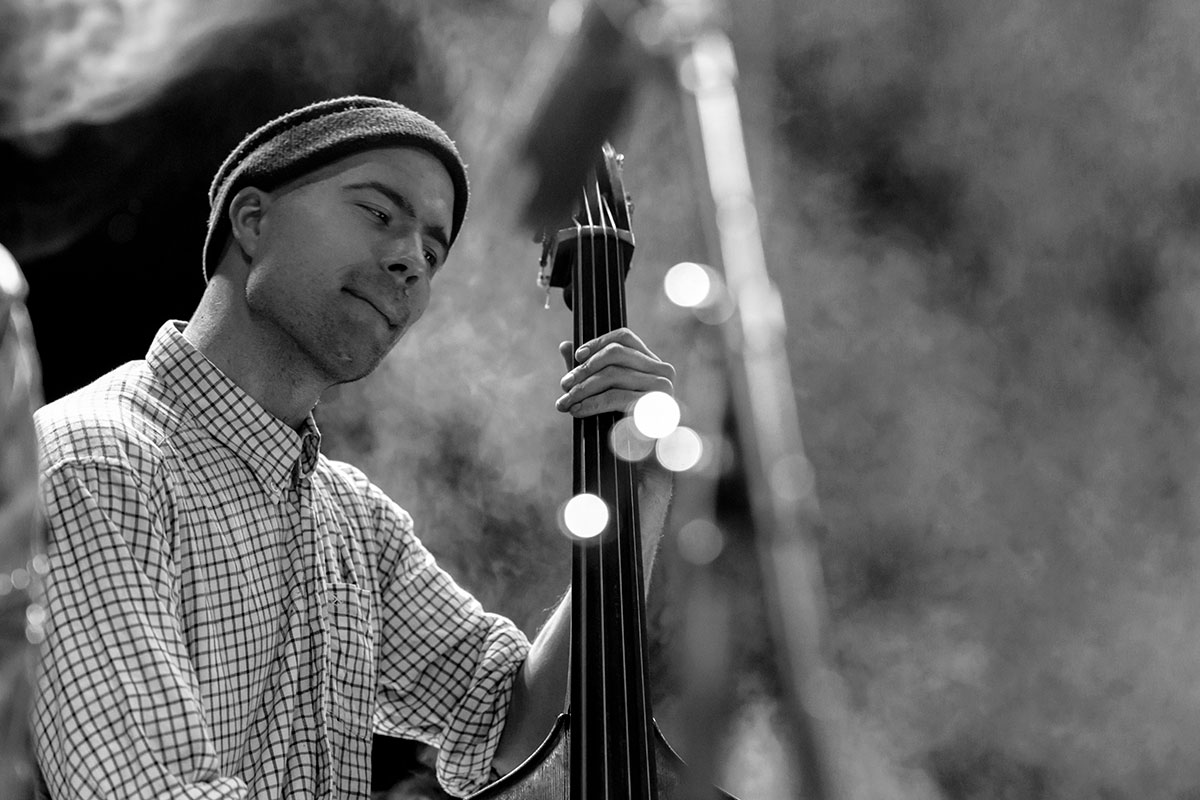
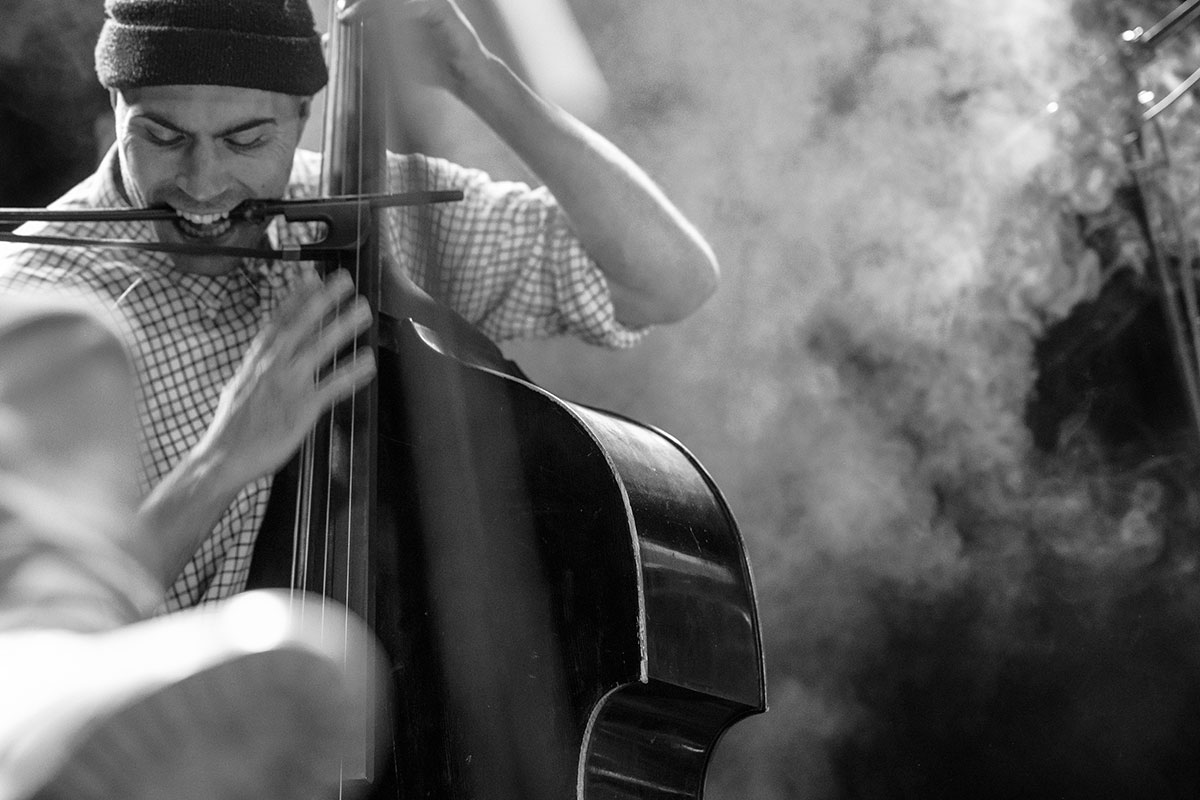
Christian Meaas Svendsen in Aarhus (Denmark 2023 Photo Hreinn Gudlaugsson)

Christian Meaas Svendsen (born 26 February 1988) is a Norwegian jazz bassist. He has worked with Nakama, Paal Nilssen-Love Large Unit, Mopti, Momentum, Aksiom, Ayumi Tanaka Trio and Duplex. He runs Nakama Records.

== Career ==
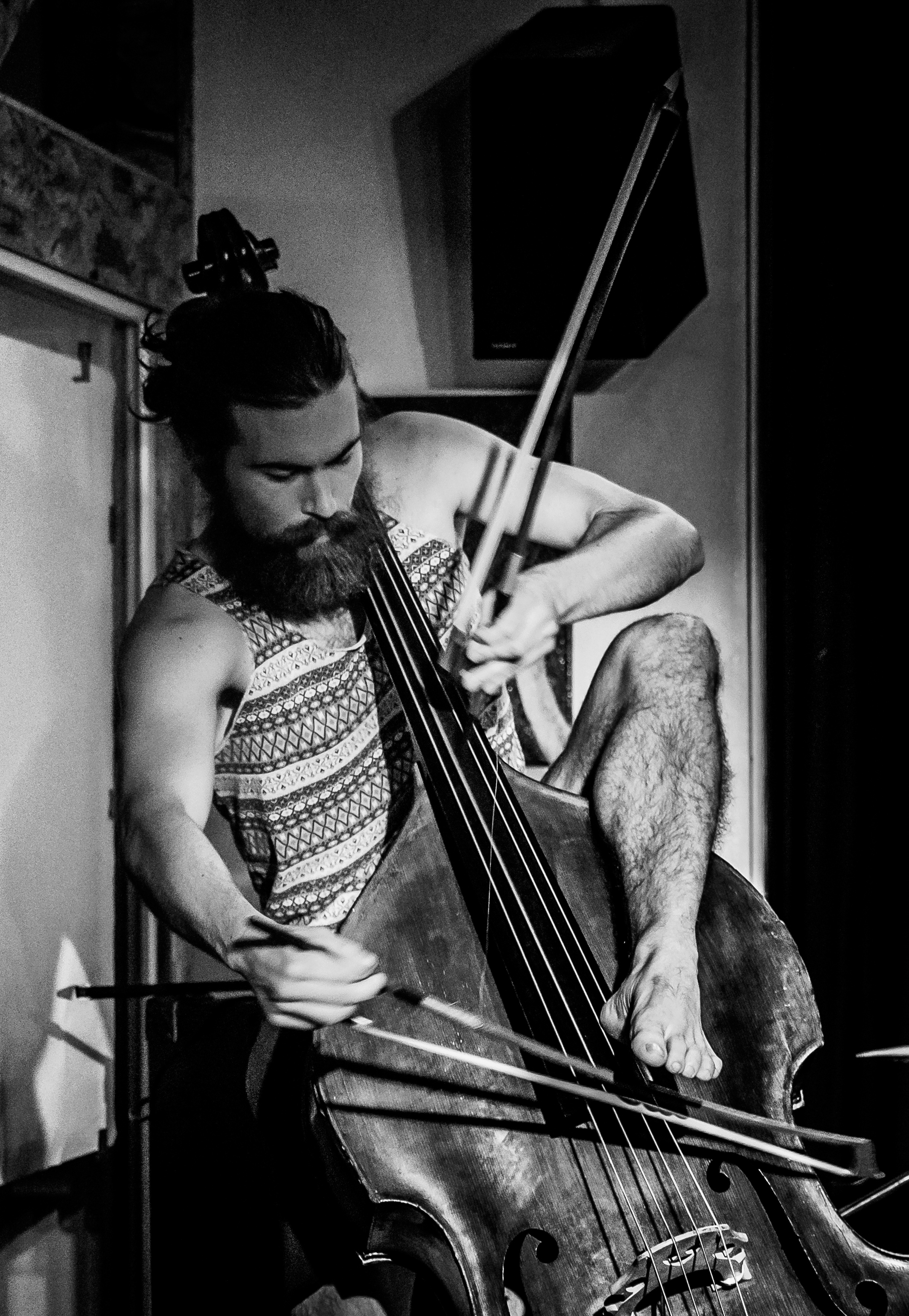
Meaas Svendsen at Christianshavns Beboerhus during Copenhagen Jazz festival 2016 (Photo by Peter Gannushkin)

Svendsen started his jazz career within Kongsberg Big Band, was a year at Toneheim folkehøgskole and later studied Performing jazz music at the Norwegian Academy of Music (NMH) in Oslo where he did a bachelor in both jazz/improv and classical music. During his years at NMH he studied under Bjørn Kjellemyr and Dan Styffe. He also exchanged to Cologne where he studied under Dieter Manderscheid, Sebastian Gramss and Dietmar Fuhr. In 2007 he was awarded Kongsberg Jazzfestival's talent scholarship. During the Kongsberg Jazzfestival in 2010, Svendsen referred to as "the festival's busiest musician" by Laagendalsposten when he performed seven gigs in different constellations during the festival. In 2011 he received Kongsberg Municipality's Cultural . for his involvement with the city's traditional festival JuleJam.

Together with his own quintet Mopti he won the 2012 JazzIntro award. He is a member of the band Nakama with Adrian Løseth Waade, Andreas Wildhagen, Agnes Hvizdalek and Ayumi Tanaka. The band runs Nakama Records.

Svendsen is also noted for his work with several (2–3) bows at the same time, and also playing with his feet. Quoting from one of his essays from his website, "The body of the instrument and our own body is the ingredients that make up sound, so there is always an aspect of physicality involved, sometimes obvious, sometimes not so much ... I am trying to utilize my body in its current condition to create music that is genuine for this exact time and space...Hands, feet, cheek, head, mouth, voice, arms, legs."

He has worked with Paal Nilssen-Love, Susana Santos Silva, Arild Andersen, Per Oddvar Johansen, Akira Sakata, and Jørgen Mathisen.

== Honors ==
- 2007: Kongsberg Jazzfestival's talent scholarship
- 2011: Kongsberg Municipality's Cultural Grant

== Discography ==
- 2016 Forms & Poses (Nakama)
- 2017 Avin (Nakama)
- 2015: Before the Storm, Nakama (Nakama)
- 2016: Grand Line, Nakama (Nakama)
- 2016: Most Intimate, Nakama (Nakama)
- 2017:Worst Generation, Nakama (Nakama)
- 2013: Duolia, Duplex (norCD)
- 2013: Sketches of..., Duplex (norCD)
- 2014: First blow, Large Unit (PNL)
- 2014: Erta Ale, Large Unit (PNL)
- 2015: Én, Duplex (norCD)
- 2015: Riofun, Large Unit (PNL)
- 2016: Memento, Ayumi Tanaka Trio (AMP)
- 2016: Landet Er Gitt Oss, Filosofer (Nakama)
- 2016: Ana, Landet er gitt oss (PNL)
- 2016: Rasengan! Susana Santos Silva, Christine Wodrascka, Christian Meaas Svendsen, and Håkon Berre (Barefoot)
- 2016: Momentum, Momentum (Clean Feed)
- 2012: Andrea Kvintett, Andrea Kvintett (NorCD)
- 2013: Russian Dream, Andrea Kvintett (NorCD)
- 2013: Knyst!, Knyst! (Gaffer)
- 2013: W/M, Christian Meaas Svendsen and Christian Winther (Vafongool)
- 2014: ÄIO, ÄIO (Katariin Raska)
- 2015: Circles, Magnus Bakken Quartet (AMP Music &)
- 2016: Rasengan! (Barefoot)
- 2016: Aksiom, Aksiom (Lawo Classics)
