= Andrew Arnautov =

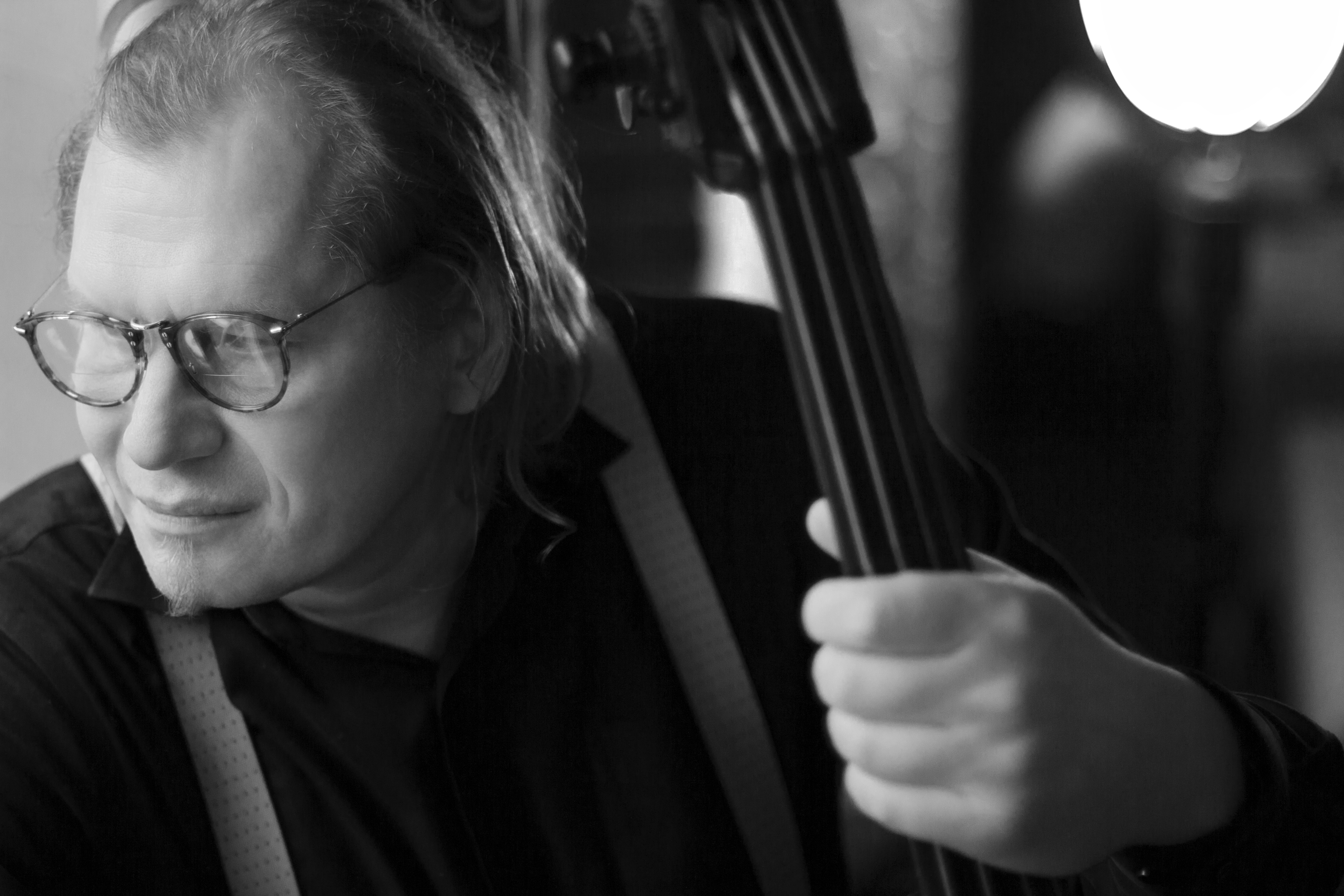
- Andrew Arnautov, 2017

Background information
- Born: Andrew Valentine Arnautov uk. Андрій Арнаутов rus. Андрей Арнаутов; August 27, 1967; Rostov-on-Don, RSFSR
- Genres: Jazz, Contemporary Classical Music, Salsa, Afro-Cuban Jazz, Latin jazz, Trip-Hop, Jazz Fusion
- Occupations: Musician, Composer, Arranger, Educator
- Instruments: Double Bass, Bass Guitar
- Years active: 1986 — present
- Website: andrewarnautov.eu5.net

Andrew Arnautov (also known as Andrew Valentine; born August 27, 1967; Rostov-on-Don, RSFSR) is an American and Ukrainian jazz musician, music producer, virtuoso jazz bassist.

== Early life and career ==
Andrew Arnautov started his music education at Rostov College of Arts jazz department on bass guitar and double bass in 1983. In 1986, he was transferred to Gnesins State College of Music continuing his formal training. While studying in Moscow, he met David Friesen during his USSR tour with Paul Horn. Back then Arnautov frequently performed at Blue Bird Jazz Club, where he played at jam sessions with the jazz legends like Dizzy Gillespie, Pat Metheny and Paul Horn.

In 1990, after graduation from Gnesins State College of Music with BA degree in music performance Andrew Arnautov relocated to the United States. In 1991 he was granted a full Berklee College of Music scholarship. At Berklee he studied bass with Oscar Stagnaro and became fond of Afro-Cuban music, Latin Jazz and Salsa.

During Boston period he occasionally performed with trumpeter Roy Hargrove, Latin Jazz vibraphonist Victor Mendoza. In the late 1990s Andrew formed a Latin Jazz & Salsa band called "West End Mambo".

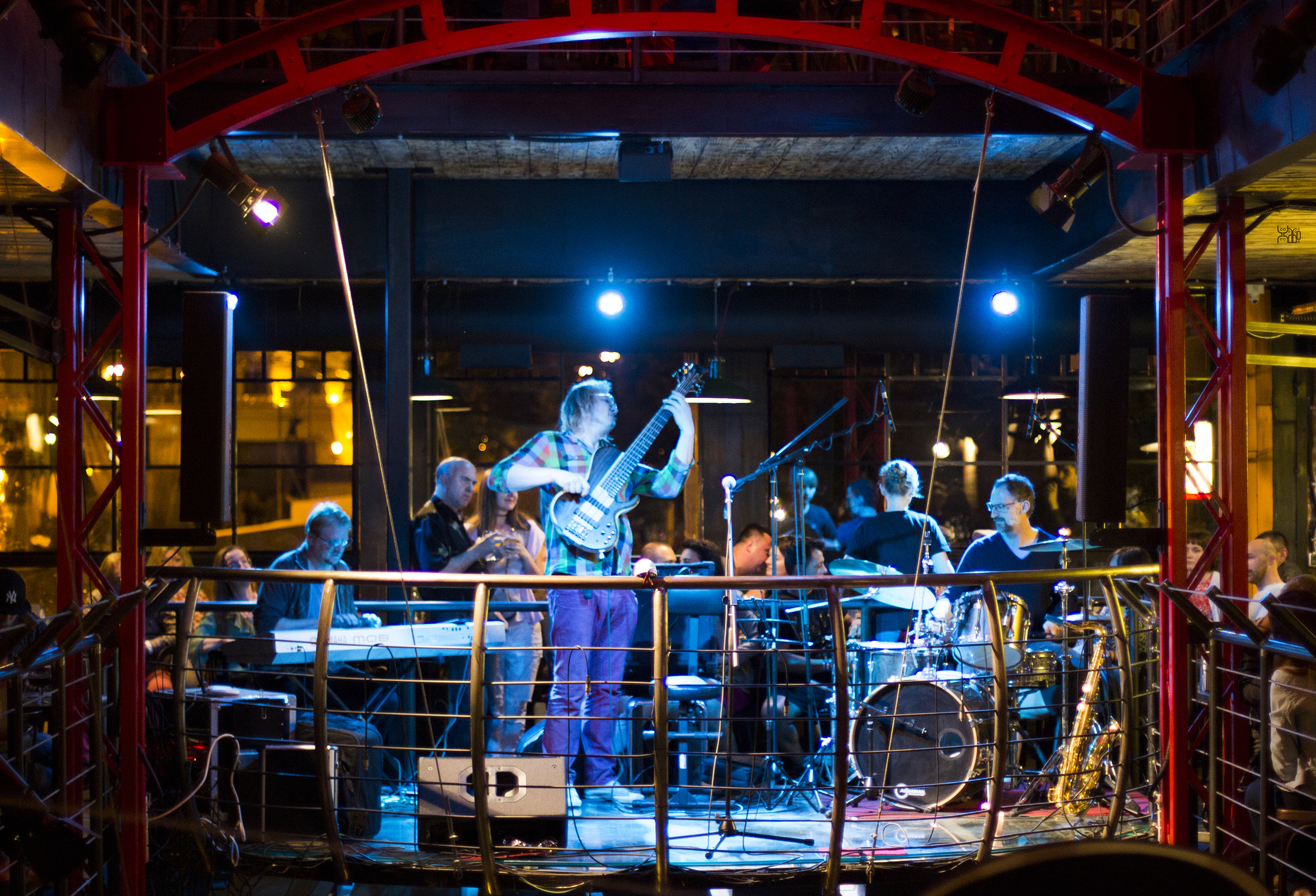
Left to right: David Siegel on keys, Andrew Arnautov on bass, Mark Walker on drums (Leopolis Jazz Fest, Lviv, Ukraine, 2016)

Since 2002, he relocated to Ukraine and has become a frequent guest at various European jazz festivals with his original projects, as well as a sideman for featured guest stars.

In 2005, he performed at the international music festival "Jazz Koktebel 2005" with his "Valentine Quartet" featuring Lew Soloff on trumpet.

In 2008, he recorded an album with Sonny Rollins' pianist Mark Soskin.

In 2013, Andrew was a studio musician for Ukrainian historical drama "The Guide" and appeared in the movie as a double bass player.

In 2016, he performed in a duo project with David Friesen at music festival Jazz Bez. The next year he became an arranger of Friesen's original music written for brass orchestra, which was performed by National Academic Symphonic Band of Ukraine in May, 2017.

Since 2017, Andrew is regularly cooperating with the son of Ray Brown and Ella Fitzgerald — Ray Brown Jr. In 2018 he recorded an album with R. Brown Jr. The same year Arnautov became a bandleader and composer at Ukrainian "Late Night Show with Yuriy Marchenko".

In 2020, the album "Testimony" of David Friesen original music was released with Arnautov's arrangements and orchestration for Brass Orchestra and Quartet.

== Discography ==
1994 — Ken Rhodes Trio "Noble Cause"

2000 — Clare Fader "The Elephant's Baby"

2000 — Greg Hyslop "Greg Hyslop Trio" (with Andrew Valentine on bass in "How insensitive")

2006 — Andrew Valentine "Compiled over the years"

2008 — Alex Fantaev, Andrew Arnautov, Mark Soskin, Dmitry 'Bobeen' Alexandrov "SkhidSide meets Mark Soskin"

2008 — "Compilation: Bass Kolo"

2013 — Andrew Arnautov "Manifestations"

2018 — Ray Brown Jr. "This is Ray Brown Jr."

2020 — David Friesen "Testimony"

== See also ==
List of jazz bassists
