= Tim Hauff =

American jazz musician

Timothy Andrew Hauff (born 1952) is an American jazz double bassist, electric bassist and educator.

== Early years ==
Hauff was born into a musical family in Sioux City and raised in the small nearby community of Merrill. Hauff's brother and a sister played drums and another sister played saxophone. Hauff began the clarinet at age 11 and by age 15 was playing electric guitar. When he was offered a place in a regional rhythm & blues band, Spectacle, on the condition he switch to bass guitar, he removed the top 2 strings from his guitar and began to practice. Hauff was soon proficient on the bass guitar and the band became a regional favorite, touring a 5-state region of Iowa, Nebraska, South Dakota, Minnesota and Wisconsin. The 8-piece group was a popular regional show band and all of its former members have since been inducted into the Iowa Rock & Roll Hall of Fame.1

== Professional development and career ==
In 1973 Hauff enlisted in the U.S. Navy and continued to perform. The military brought him to the San Francisco area by 1974 and it was while in the service that he acquired his first double bass, and began serious study of the instrument. Following discharge, he studied classical double bass from 1981-1983 with Robert Manning and Murray Grodner, and concurrently studied Jazz bass with Ron McLure, Don Haas and Chuck Israels. Additionally, Hauff studied theory and composition with Joe Henderson. In 1983, a combo he formed won high acclaim at the Pacific Coast Jazz Festival.

Hauff received both his B.A. (1984) and his M.A. (1990) from San Jose State University.1

Settling in San Francisco after discharge from the Navy, Hauff performed there through 1994 with a long list of major jazz artists, among them Joe Henderson, Eddie Moore, Steve Turre, Norbert Stachel, Snooky Young, Sam Most, Jeff Clayton, Victor Lewis, Lew Soloff, David Matthews, Wayne Shorter, Vince Lataeno and Herbie Hancock. Additionally, Hauff recorded with John Handy, Eddie Henderson, Calvin Keys, Jeff Chimente, Brian Melvin, Danny Walsh, Gary Fisher, Peter Horvath, Richie Goldberg, Mark Little, Lewis Nash, Gaylord Birch, Mel Martin, Graham Bruce, Paul Mousavi, Steve Cardenas, Bob Bauer, Frank Samuels, Faye Carol, Donald 'Duck' Bailey and Bruce Forman as well as E.W. Wainwright and the African Roots of Jazz.1

== Working abroad ==
In 1994, following performances in Stockholm, Hauff went to Thailand where he remained for six years, teaching music and English and performing with Jazz groups in major Bangkok hotels and at regional jazz festivals. He also performed with the Bangkok Symphony Orchestra during this period. From 1996-1998, Hauff wrote a monthly jazz column in the publication, Guide To Bangkok.1

Hauff currently makes his home in Las Vegas, where he is actively performing and teaching bass.
