= Duplex (Norwegian duo) =

Norwegian jazz duo

- Origin: Oslo, Norway
- Genres: Jazz
- Years active: 2010–present
- Labels: NorCD
- Members: Christian Meaas Svendsen; Harald Lassen
- Website: www.christianmeaassvendsen.com/projects/duplex

Duplex (initiated in 2010 in Oslo, Norway) is a Norwegian jazz duo comprising Harald Lassen and Christian Meaas Svendsen.

== Biography ==
Saxophonist Lassen and bassist Svendsen collaborate in a series of settings, so it came naturally when they decided to explore the duo format. Duplex's repertoire ranges widely, and this to fully exploit the possibilities of this somewhat unorthodox format. The duo emphasizes a strong sense of freedom, but this freedom mainly involves passages within harmonic structures. The most interesting part is the approach to this material, and working to combine jazz tradition with European music.

== Personnel ==
- Harald Lassen – saxophones
- Christian Meaas Svendsen – upright bass

== Discography ==
- 2013: Duolia (NorCD)
- 2013: Sketches Of ... (NorCD)
- 2015: Èn (NorCD)
