= Ayumi Tanaka =

Japanese pianist and composer (born 1986)

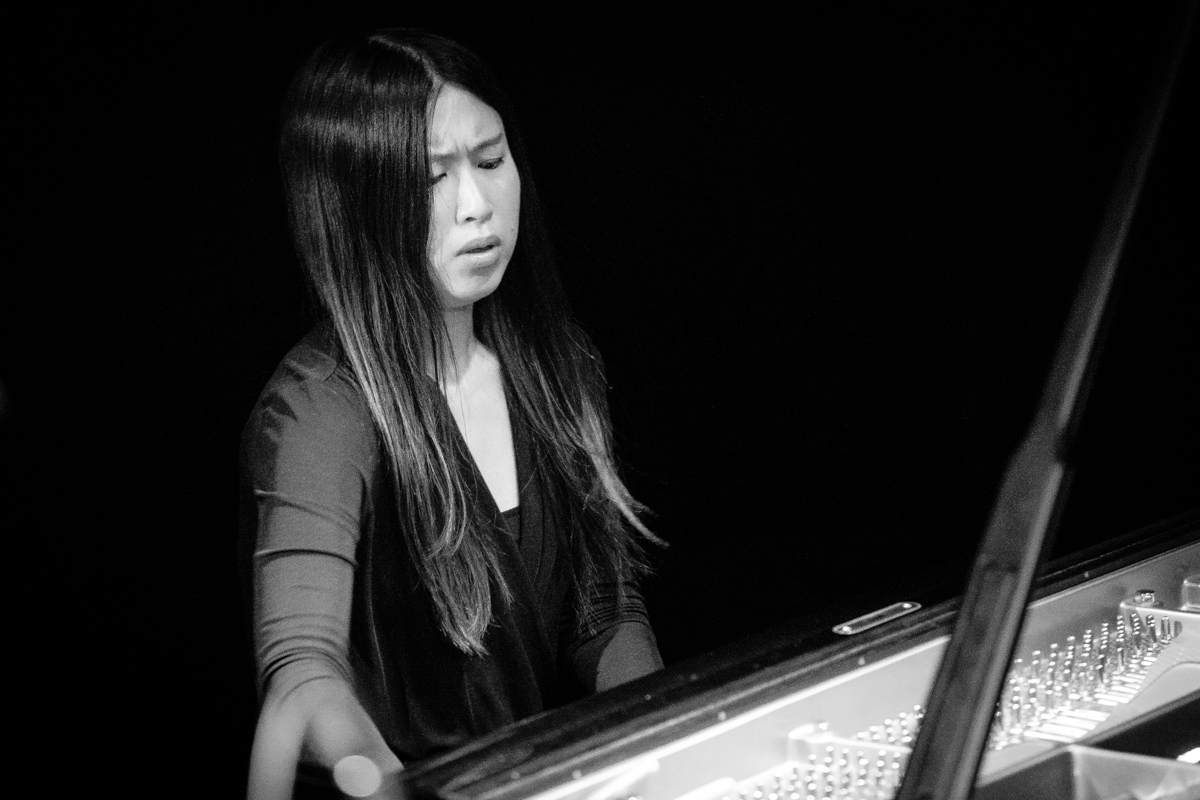
- Ayumi Tanaka performing in 2018

Background information
- Born: 1986 (age 39–40)
- Origin: Japan
- Genres: Jazz
- Occupations: Musician, composer
- Instrument: Piano
- Website: https://www.ayumitanakamusic.com

Ayumi Tanaka (born 1986) is a Japanese pianist and composer, known for numerous albums with Norwegian and international jazz musicians.

== Education ==
Tanaka moved to Norway in 2011, and got her education at the Norwegian Academy of Music in Oslo, where she finished her master's degree as a performing jazz musician, after studies with Misha Alperin, Ivar Antonsen, Helge Lien and others.

== Career ==
Tanaka is acclaimed for her own trio with the bass player Christian Meaas Svendsen and the drummer Per Oddvar Johansen. The group released their debut album Memento in January 2016. With the trio Tanaka/Lindvall/Wallumrød, with Johan Lindvall and Christian Wallumrød, she released the album 3 Pianos i 2016. She has also recorded with Nakama, Mongrel, and with Thomas Strønen's acclaimed Time is A blind Guide on ECM.

== Discography ==
=== As band leader ===
Ayumi Tanaka Trio with Christian Meaas Svendsen and Per Oddvar Johansen

- 2016: Memento (AMP Music & Records)
- 2021: Subaqueous Silence (ECM)

Tanaka/Lindvall/Wallumrød with Johan Lindvall and Christian Wallumrød

- 2016: 3 pianos (Nakama Records)

=== Collaborations ===
With Thomas Strønen's Time is A blind Guide

- 2018: Lucus (ECM)

With Nakama

- 2015: Before The Storm (Nakama Records)
- 2016:Grand line (Nakama Records)
- 2016:Most Intimate (Nakama Records)
- 2017:Worst Generation (Nakama Records)

With Mongrel

- 2016: Thick As Thieves (Losen Records)
