= David Aleksander Sjølie =

- Born: 7 May 1988 (age 38); Kongsberg, Buskerud
- Origin: Norway
- Genres: Jazz
- Occupations: Musician, composer
- Instrument: Guitar
- Labels: NorCD; Jazzland Recordings
- Member of: Mopti
- Website: www.aleksandersjolie.com

David Aleksander Sjølie (born 7 May 1988) is a Norwegian jazz guitarist, known from bands like Mopti, married 31 July 2014, to the jazz singer Anja Eline Skybakmoen.

== Career ==
Sjølie was born in Oslo, where he lives and works as a musician, producer and studio engineer. He studied jazz and improvisation at the Norwegian Academy of Music (2013). As a performing musician, he is grounded in different musical traditions such as jazz, pop, country and rock, and is collaborating in bands like Mopti, Angus and Grandmas Grand. He is teaching guitar in Oslo.

== Discography ==
With Bendik Baksaas Band

- 2012: The Shape of Beats To Come (Dayladore Collective)
- 2013: 1991 (Aspén)

With Ine Hoem

- 2013: The Island (Impeller Recordings)

With Mopti

- 2013: Logic (Jazzland Recordings)
- 2015: Bits & Pieces (Jazzland Recordings)

With Lise Hvoslef

- 2014: Mapping the coincidence (Lise Hvoslef Records)

With Anja

- 2014: We're The Houses (Øra Fonogram)
- 2015: Echo (Triogram)
