= Mopti (band) =

Norwegian band

- Origin: Oslo, Norway
- Genres: Jazz
- Years active: 2008–present
- Labels: Cuneiform Records
- Members: Christian Meaas Svendsen; Andreas Wildhagen; David Aleksander Sjølie; Kristoffer Eikrem; Harald Lassen
- Website: mopti.no

Mopti (established 2008 in Oslo, Norway) is a Norwegian experimental jazz band.

== Band members ==
- Harald Lassen - saxophone
- Kristoffer Eikrem - trumpet
- David Aleksander Sjølie - guitar
- Christian Meaas Svendsen - double bass
- Andreas Wildhagen - drums

== Honors ==
- 2012: Awarded "This year's young jazz musicians" at Moldejazz

== Discography ==
- 2013: Logic (Ocean Sound Recordings)
- 2015: Bits & Pieces (Jazzland Recordings)
