= Andreas Wildhagen =

Norwegian jazz drummer (born 1988)

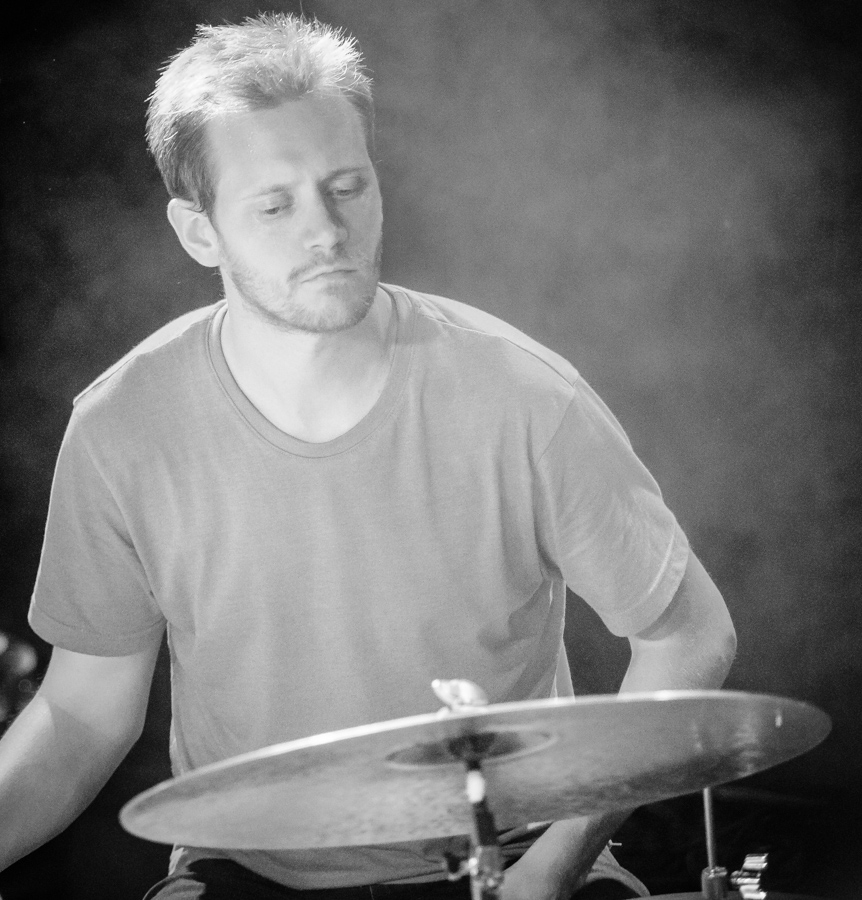
- Andreas Wildhagen performing in 2018

Background information
- Born: 31 July 1988 (age 37); Oslo, Norway
- Origin: Norway
- Genres: Jazz
- Occupations: Musician, composer
- Instrument: Drums
- Label: Nakama Records
- Member of: Mopti
- Website: www.nakamarecords.no/andreas-wildhagen

Andreas Wildhagen (born 31 July 1988 in Oslo, Norway) is a Norwegian jazz drummer.

== Biography ==
Wildhagen was raised in Oslo and attended the Norwegian Academy of Music in 2012, and earned his Master's degree in 2014. He has become a much sought after jazz drummer and participates on a series of records with bands like Paal Nilssen-Love Large Unit, Nakama, Lana Trio, Momentum, Jonas Cambien Trio, and Mopti. In 2016 he released his debut solo album No Right No Left on Nakama Records.

== Discography ==
=== Solo albums ===
- 2016: No Right No Left (Nakama Records)

=== Collaborations ===
With Mopti

- 2013: Logic (Ocean Sound Recordings)
- 2016: Bits & Pieces (Jazzland Recordings), featuring Bendik Baksaas

With Lana Trio

- 2013: Lana Trio (Va Fongool)
- 2014: Live In Japan (Va Fongool)

With Paal Nilssen-Love Large Unit

- 2014: First Blow (PNL Records)
- 2014: Erta Ale (PNL Records)
- 2015: Rio Fun (PNL Records)
- 2015: 2015 (PNL Records)
- 2016: Ana (PNL Records)

With Nakama

- 2015: Before The Storm (Nakama Records)
- 2016: Grand Line (Nakama Records)
- 2016:Most Intimate (Nakama Records)
- 2017:Worst Generation (Nakama Records)

With Momentum

- 2016: Momentum (Clean Feed)

With Jonas Cambien Trio

- 2016: A Zoology Of The Future (Clean Feed)
