= List of compositions for double bass =

The following is a list of notable compositions for the double bass.

== Solo works ==
- Beth Anderson
  - May Swale
- Lera Auerbach
  - Monolog for double bass solo (1996) (2009)
  - Memory of tango: for double bass solo (2002)
- Mary Ellen Childs
  - Unfettered
- Hanne Darboven
  - Opus 17A
- Margaret Marie Dare
  - Study in G minor; Study in D minor; A Minor Major Study; Bowing Study in 3/8; Study in D major
  - Study in E minor; Semi quaver Study, In "Yorke Studies, Vol. 1." (1972)
- Deirdre Gribbin
  - Maps of Awakening (2021)
- Sofia Gubaidulina
  - Eight etudes (preludes): for double bass solo (1974)
  - 5 Etudes (1965)
  - Pantomime (1966)
  - Sonata (1976) pub. Sikorski (1991)
  - Tatar Dance (1992)
  - "Ein EngeL" (1994)
  - Galgenlieder (a3) (Christian Morgenstern) (1995-96)
  - Galgenlieder (a5) (Christian Morgenstern) (1996)
- Sadie Harrison
  - Sparring with Shadows (2013)
- Teppo Hauta-aho
  - Kadenza
  - Raphsody for double bass solo
- Hans Werner Henze
  - Serenade for cello transcribed for double bass
  - San Biagio 9 Agosto Ore 1207
- Dorothy Hindman
  - Time management (2004) (2017)
- Eva-Maria Houben
  - Archipelagos
  - Nachtstück
- Catherine Lamb
  - Mirror
- Joëlle Léandre
  - Taxi (1987)
  - Bass Drum
  - A voix Basse (1981)
  - Octobre (1989)
  - For Peter H. (2005)
  - Temoignege
- Anne LeBaron
  - Inner Voice (2003)
- Annea Lockwood
  - Deep Dream Dive (1973)
  - Secret Life (1989)
- Henri O'Kelly jr.
  - Polyorgane (pub'd 1920)
- Behzad Ranjbaran
  - Ballade for Unaccompanied Contrabass (1999)
- Kajia Saariaho
  - Folia
- Claudio Santoro
  - Fantasia Sul América
- Rebecca Saunders
  - Fury
- Amy Williams
  - Don't Tell Susan (1992)
- Ian Wilson
  - Pianura (2004)
- Peteris Vasks
  - Bass Trip

== Two or more basses ==
- Sofia Gubaidulina
  - Mirage: The Dancing Sun
- Bertold Hummel
  - Sinfonia piccola for 8 double basses (1978)
- Kristin Korb
  - On the Prowl (2005) for 4 double basses

== Chamber works ==
- Els Aarne
  - Sonata for Double Bass and Piano Op. 63 (1980)
- Kyoko Abe
  - Quartet (Ariadne) (1980)
- Esther Aeschlimann-Roth
  - Die Zeiten Andern Sich, 7 Audiovisual Pieces (1984)
    - Nachte (1985)
    - Stmfen (1985)
    - Tage (1985)
    - Flicker-teppich (1983)
    - Ein Baum ist ein Baum ist ein Baum (1986)
    - Crisalida (1996)
    - Secoli
    - Spazio
- Elaine Agnew
  - Rite On! (1995)
- Peg Ahrens
  - And then you laughed (1974)
  - Together Again (1971)
- Kathryn Alexander
  - Lemon Drops (1998) (2001) for baritone voice, double bass, and mixed percussion
- Eleanor Alberga
  - Animal Banter (1989)
- Luna Alcalay
  - Trio (1964)
- Kristi Allik
  - L. A. (1979)
- Birgitte Alsted
  - Timileskoven
- Beth Anderson
  - Ghent Swale for Double Bass and Piano (2001)
  - Skater's Suite (1979)
- Anna Amalie, Princess of Prussia
  - Trio (1767-87)
- Caroline Ansink
  - On my Volcano (1994)
- José Antônio Rezende de Almeida Prado (1943-2010)
  - 4 Corais, for double bass and piano
- Violet Archer
  - Six Miniatures for String Bass and Piano (1984) (1986)
- Pauline Louise Henriette Aubert
  - Two Melodies. Senart (1912)
- May Aufderheide
  - Dusts
  - The Thriller
- Maya Badian
  - Dialogues: trumpet and double-bass = trompette et contrebasse
- Elaine Barkin
  - NB Suite
- Carol Barnett
  - El Tango Languido (1984)
- Amy Beach transcription for double bass by Alexander Verster
  - Romance
- Sally Beamish
  - Dances and Nocturnes (1986)
  - Five Changing Pictures
- Janet Beat
  - Convergences (1992)
- Gustavo Becerra-Schmidt (1925-2010)
  - Sonata, for double bass and piano
- Kirsty Beilharz
  - Earth Essence: Air, Earth, Water, Stars (1993)
- Carla Huston Bell
  - Ode to Martin Luther King (1976)
- Sylvia Bergen
  - Festival Frolic
- Johanna Beyer
  - Movement for Double Bass and Piano (1936) (1996)
  - Movement for String Quartet (1938)
- Annesley Black
  - Lauf: für neun Musiker (2005)
- Victoria Bond
  - C-A-G-E-D (1972)
  - Seesaw (1987)
  - Old New Borrowed Blues (1986)
- Maria Bonzanigo
  - La Gatta (1990)
- Giovanni Bottesini
  - Romanza: Une bouche aimeé, for soprano, double bass and piano
  - Terzetto: Tutto che il mondo serra (transcription of Etude No.19 in C-sharp minor, Op.25/7 by Chopin) for soprano, double bass and piano
  - Rêverie, for double bass and piano
- Linda Bouchard
  - Propos Nouveaux (1988)
  - Web Trap (1982)
  - Icy Cruise (1984)
  - Possible Nudity (1987)
  - Risky. Maurice Tourigny (1993)
- Nadia Boulanger
  - Three Pieces for Cello and Piano
- Margaret Susan Brandman
  - Jazz Impressions (1976)
  - Flights of Fancy (1976)
- Nancy Louise Briggs
  - Little Song (1982)
- Elizabeth Brown
  - Field Guide (1986)
  - Figures in a Landscape (1995)
- Heidi Bruggmann
  - Landler; Marches; Polkas; Schottisches; Waltzes
- Joanna Bruzdowicz-Titel
  - Party Contra (1982)
- Dorothy Buchanon
  - Three Jacques Prevert Settings (1971)
- Dawn Buckholz
  - 20 Century Duets for Strings (1989)
- Diana Burrell
  - Angelus (1986)
- Cheryl Camm
  - Trombone Sonata (1988)
- Karen Campbell
  - Only One (1974)
  - Duo for Double Bass and Piano
- Edith Canat de Chizy
  - Black-Light (1986)
- Constanza Capdeville
  - In sommo pacis. 1980. Ob, va, db, pf. 58.
  - Valse, valsa, vals: Keuschheits Waltz (1987)
  - 1+1+1+1 (1989)
  - Memoriae, quasi una fantasia I
- Ida Carroll
  - Three Pieces for Double Bass. Forsyth Bros. Db, pf. 44, 66.
  - Five National Dances [Five Simple Pieces] (1988)
- Monic Cecconi-Botella
  - Histoire Breve II. Philippa (1968)
- Julia Cenova
  - Music In the Pause (1988)
  - Monday to Friday, Jazz Cycle (1984)
- Paulo C. Chagas (1953)
  - Canzona I, for double bass and piano
- Janine Charbonnier
  - 240 joursa mEtEo (1982)
- Mary Elizabeth Chaves
  - Silentium (1979)
- Rhona Clarke
  - SoundWorks Suite No. 2 for Young Players (1995)
- Rosemary Clarke
  - Suite (1966)
  - Serpents-Soldiers (1969)
- Harry Crowl (1958)
  - Aethra II, for double bass and piano
- Jeanne Colin-De Clerk
  - Trio, op. 10 (1969)
- Lizzie Cook
  - Move On (1987)
- Constance Cooper
  - The Hour of the Shepard (1989)
- Esther Wallach Crane
  - Cords (1977)
- Margaret Marie Dare
  - Minuet
- Tina Davidson
  - Wait for the End of Dreaming (1984)
  - Quintet (1981)
- Jean-Marie Depeisenaire
  - Sous la neige (1968)
- Margaret DeWys
  - St. Jeronimo Variations (1991)
- Arline Diamond
  - Bass Solo (1965)
- Lycia DiBiase Bidart
  - Adulto e Crianco (1976)
- Tamar Diesendruck
  - The Orchestra (1993)
- Violeta Dinescu-Lucaci
  - Satya III (1981)
  - Satya V (1981)
  - Sonatina (1982)
  - Sleep Song (1982)
  - Toy (1982)
  - Figuren 1 (1990)
  - Scherzo da Fantasia IV (1992)
- Elaine Dobson
  - Two Ruthies (1971)
- Isobel Dunlop
  - Ardkinglas Suite (1967)
- Dorothy Smith Dushkin
  - Fantasy for Three
  - Percussion Plus, Suite
- Rosemary Duxbury
  - Three Dances (1989)
- Sylvia Eichenwald
  - Sie erlischt (1977)
- Adrienne Elisha
  - Quintet (1996)
- Caroline Emery
  - Bass is Beautiful, Vol. 1. 120 melodies
- Caroline Emery and Carol Barratt and Sheila Joynes
  - Bass is Beautiful, Vol. 2. 72 melodies: 48 by Emery, 7 arr. Emery, 1 by Sheila Joynes. 23 accompaniments by Carol Barratt
- Rachel Amelia Eubanks
  - Three Songs (1984)
- Mary Even-or
  - Dances (1961)
- Louise Farrenc
  - Piano Quintet No. 1 in a minor, op. 30. Costallat (1842)
  - Piano Quintet No. 2 in E, op. 31. Costallat (1845)
- Vivian Fine
  - Melos (1964)
- Graciane Finzi
  - Songes (1973-74)
  - Processus 2 (1986)
- Elena Firsova
  - Rakovina [Sea Shell]
- Susan Fisher
  - Song of Vanessa (1976)
  - Honore a B (1983)
- Jennifer Fowler
  - Echoes from an Antique Land (1983)
  - Restless Dust (1988)
- Erika Fox
  - Pas de Deux (1981)
- Dorothea Franchi
  - A Man of Life Upright
- Sherilyn Gail Fritz
  - Childhoods Ago (1978)
- Janina Garscia-Gressel
  - Miniatures (1970)
- Brigitte Gauthier
  - Improvisation et Final (1956)
- Debra Lynn Ginsberg
  - Polyphony 2
- Ruth Gipps
  - Introduction and Carol, op 71 (1988)
- Suzanne Giraud
  - Episode en forme d'oubli (1989)
  - Bleu et Ombre. Visage (1993)
- Peggy Glanville-Hicks
  - Girondelle for Giraffes (1978)
- Diana R. Green
  - Rigorisms, no. 2 (1982)
- Maria Grenfell
  - Concertino (1995)
- Margaret Ann Griebling-Haigh
  - Sonata
- Deena Grossman
  - Music of Spaces; Asunder; Expanses; Ellipse; Unfolding (1983)
  - Sea Cliff Hands Quartet
  - Grzondziel, Eleonora. Sonata (1966)
- Radamés Gnattali (1906-1988)
  - Canção e dança, for double bass and piano
  - Valsa triste, for saxophone, double bass and piano
- Sofiya Gubaidulina
  - Sonata for double bass and piano
  - Pantomime (1966) (1991)
- Elizabeth Gyring
  - Concert Piece; Largo
- Ann Hanskausen
  - Duo
- Sadie Harrison
  - A Journey, (2015) (2016)
  - Harlequinade (2012)
  - Theo's Lullaby (2021)
  - Flower of the cherry
  - Robin's lullaby: for double bass & piano (2015)
  - Theo's Toddle (2013)
- Sorrel Hays
  - Tuning, no. 1 (1978)
  - Hedstr~m,Ase
  - Touche (1996)
- František Hertl
  - Sonata for Double Bass and Piano (1946)
- Moya Henderson
  - Clearing the Air (1974)
- Paul Hindemith
  - Sonata for Double bass and Piano
- Imogen Clare Holst
  - Homage to William
- Eleanor Hovda
  - Journey music (1981)
  - Music from Several Summers (1972)
  - Earth runner (1966)
  - Firefall (1979)
  - Gargoyles
  - Oracles (1976)
  - Solo for Anthony (1973)
- Bertold Hummel (1925-2002)
  - Sonatina for double bass and piano (1979)
- Anne LeBaron
  - Fertility (1971) for flute, marimba, 2 bongos, and double bass
- Arthur Lourié (1892-1966)
  - Sonata for violin and double bass
- Cecilia McDowall
  - Blue Giant (2000)
- Cindy McTee
  - Changes (1996) (2013)
- Flo Menezes (1962)
  - Apologia dos Arquétipos, for double bass and piano
- Florentine Mulsant
  - Sonate pour contrebasse et piano op. 52 (2014)
- Pauline Oliveros
  - Double Basses at Twenty Paces - For two basses, their seconds, referee and tape
  - Trio for Accordion, Trumpet and String Bass (1961)
  - Blue Heron: In Memory of James Tenney for Piano and string bass (2006)
  - Epigraphs in the Time of Aids for Accordion, Trombone, Keyboard
- Sergei Prokofjev
  - Quintet in G minor, Op. 39
- Behzad Ranjbaran (1955)
  - Dance of Life for Violin and Contrabass (1990)
- Elizabeth Raum
  - A poet's day for soprano and string bass
  - Arabesque for English horn and double bass
- Franz Schubert
  - Trout Quintet in A major, D.667
- Alexander Shchetynsky
  - Seven Screen Shots for double bass and piano (2005)
- Germaine Tailleferre
  - Impressionisme for flute, double bass and two pianos
- Raul do Valle (1936)
  - Interação, for double bass and piano
- Ellen Taaffe Zwilich
  - Excursion (2017) for bass and piano

== Concertante works ==
=== Concertos ===
- Els Aarne
  - Concerto for Double Bass (1968) double bass and orchestra
- Ardashes Agoshian
  - Concerto for Double Bass and a cappella choir "Romeo and Juliet" (2011)
- Kalevi Aho
  - Double Bass Concerto (2005)
- Mauricio Annunziata
  - Concerto No. 1 for Double Bass and Orchestra "Argentino", Op. 123 (2015)
  - Concerto No. 2 for Double Bass and Orchestra "Afroargentino", Op. 125 (2015)
  - Concerto No. 3 for Double Bass and Orchestra "Porteño", Op. 129 (2016)
- Francine Aubin
  - Concert pour Ariane (1988)
- Judith Bailey
  - Double Bass Concerto in the Style of Haydn (2008) (2017)
- Ragnhild Berstad
  - Origo (1989-91) for Solo Double Bass and String Quartet
- Anatoly Bogatyrev
  - Double bass concerto (1964)
- Giovanni Bottesini
  - Gran Concerto in F♯ minor
  - Concerto No. 2 in B minor
  - Concerto No. 3 in A major (concerto di bravura)
- Joanna Bruzdowicz-Titel
  - Concerto (1982)
- Antonio Capuzzi
  - Concerto in D (F) major
- Georgi Conus
  - Concerto in h moll, op.29 (1910)
- Andrzej Cwojdziński
  - Concerto
- Peter Maxwell Davis
  - Strathclyde Concerto No. 7 for Double Bass and Orchestra (1992)
- Carl Ditters von Dittersdorf
  - Concerto in E♭ major
  - Concerto No. 2 in E Major
- Domenico Dragonetti
  - Concerto in G major, D290
  - Concerto in D dur
  - Concerto in A major no 3
  - Concerto in A major no 5
  - Concerto in A major (Nanny)
- Pere Valls i Duran
  - Gran Concert Obligat
- Fernand Fontaine
  - Concerto As dur
- Jean Françaix
  - Concerto for double bass and orchestra (1974)
- Harald Genzmer
  - Concerto for Kontrabass and String Orchestra (1996)
- Thomas Goss
  - Double Bass Concerto in E Minor
- Jamie Tait-Glossop
  - Concerto in D major, Op. 5
- Teppo Hauta-aho
  - Hippovariaatioita putkessa ja ilman (Hippo-Variations Within a Tube Without, 1983)
- Hans Werner Henze
  - Double Bass Concerto (1966)
- Franz Anton Hoffmeister
  - Concerto No. 1 in D major
  - Concerto No. 2 in D major
  - Concerto No. 3 in D major
- Robin Holloway
  - Concerto for Double Bass and Small Orchestra Op. 83 (2002)
- Fredrik Högberg
  - Hitting the First Base, concerto for double bass and strings
- Jiří Hudec
  - Burleska for double bass and orchestra (1981)
- Konstantin Ivanov
  - Concerto "In Romantic Style" for Double Bass and Orchestra
- Gordon Jacob
  - Concerto for Double Bass (1972)
- Tadeusz Zygfryd Kassern
  - Concerto op. 12 for Double-bass solo
- Serge Koussevitsky
  - Concerto in F♯ minor, Op. 3 (1902)
- Edward Kravchuk
  - Concerto for Double Bass, Drum set, Piano and Strings (2014)
- Serge Lancen
  - Concerto pur contrebasse et cordes
- Anne Lauber
  - Intermezzo #1) for double bass and orchestra
- Juliusz Łuciuk
  - Concerto for Double Bass and Orchestra
- Raymond Luedeke
  - Concerto for Double Bass and Orchestra (1997)
- Gennady Lyashenko
  - Concerto for Double bass and chamber orchestra (1989)
- Rolf Martinsson
  - Double Bass Concerto
- Missy Mazzoli
  - "Dark With Excessive Bright" for double bass and strings
- Edgar Meyer
  - Concerto in D for Double Bass and Orchestra (2002)
- Aleksandar Miljković
  - "Trio Olivera" solo concert for Double Bass and Orchestra (2022)
- Virgilio Mortari
  - Concerto per Franco Petracchi
- Edouard Nanny
  - Concerto in E minor
- Václav Pichl
  - Concerto in D major
- Stefan Boleslaw Poradowski
  - Double Bass Concerto
- Behzad Ranjbaran
  - Concerto for Double Bass and Orchestra (2018)
- Elizabeth Raum
  - Concerto for Double Bass and orchestra (1993/1995)
- Einojuhani Rautavaara
  - Angel of Dusk, concerto for double bass and orchestra (1980)
- Anthony Ritchie
  - Whalesong (2006)
- Malcolm D Robertson
  - Concerto for Double Bass & small orchestra (2020)
- Aldemaro Romero
  - Concierto risueño
- Nino Rota
  - Divertimento Concertante for double bass and orchestra (1968–1973)
- Rebecca Saunders
  - Fury II (2009)
- Tatyana Pavlovna Sergeyeva
  - Concerto (1980)
- Nikos Skalkottas
  - Double Bass Concerto (1942)
- Johannes Matthias Sperger
  - Concerto in D major, No. 15
- Eduard Tubin
  - Double Bass Concerto (1948)
- Johann Baptist Wanhal
  - Double Bass Concerto
- Inna Abramovna Zhvanetskaia
  - Concerto for Double Bass and Orchestra (1978)
