= Double bass concerto =

Musical work for solo contrabass/double bass and ensemble

Cover of the piano score version of Inna Zhvanetskaya's Concert for Double Bass and Orchestra

A double bass concerto is a notated musical composition, usually in three parts or movements (see concerto), for a solo double bass accompanied by an orchestra. Bass concertos typically require an advanced level of technique, as they often use very high-register passages, harmonics, challenging scale and arpeggio lines and difficult bowing techniques. Music students typically play bass concerti with the orchestral part played by a pianist who reads from an orchestral reduction (the orchestra parts arranged for piano).

== History ==
=== Origins ===
Concerti originated in the Classical era. At first, double bass concertos were very rare due to the gut strings. These strings were difficult to move with the bow and did not resonate or project as loud.

It was around 1650 that the overwound gut string was invented. This greatly increased the popularity for composers to write double bass solos.

The main eras of double bass concerts are the Classical and Romantic period. These are considered the main concerto eras until the 20th and 21st century when the Andrés Martí and Eduard Tubin concertos were written.

=== Early double bass concerti ===
The earliest bass concerto was composed by Carl von Dittersdorf in the mid 1700s. He wrote two bass concertos as well as a symphonic concerto for viola and double bass.

Other composers from the late Baroque to classical periods, such as Johannes Matthias Sperger, wrote eighteen double bass concertos. Double Bass concerti were also written by Johann Baptist Wanhal, and Joseph Haydn, although Haydn's has since been lost.

Michel Corrette changed the tuning of the double bass in 1773. Before this, double basses were tuned in thirds, known as Viennese-style tuning. This changed the way composers of the Viennese School to write virtuosic double bass solos. The appearance of Italian composer Domenico Dragonetti officially changed the status of the double bass. Dragonetti did not use the Viennese-tuned bass.

At this point, composers of the Viennese School began to try to write new double bass works. Dragonetti was a bass virtuoso who introduced advanced new techniques for the instrument, like playing in the high register, bouncing the bow (ricochet and spiccato), and using more harmonics around the instrument.

=== Further development ===
Giovanni Bottesini was known as the Paganini of double bass, a nineteenth-century bass virtuoso and composer. He made enormous contributions to the solo double bass repertoire. Among his many works are two concerti for double bass which use extremely high harmonic passages that, when Bottesini first introduced them, were deemed "unplayable".

Bottesini preferred the three-string double bass that was popular in Italy. In contrast to Dragonetti's preference for the older, palm-up bow, Bottesini adopted a cello-style bow, with the palm down. The Dragonetti-style bow is similar to the modern-day German bow and the Bottesini bow is the modern French bow.

This improvement had a great influence on later generations. Another indirect influence was the rise of an outstanding school of double bass players in the Czech region, represented by Franz Simandl, who devoted himself to the technique and teaching of double bass and left behind a number of works.

Around the late 20th century to present-day, Simandl has slowly been replaced by a new technique and theory of the double bass from François Rabbath. He has taken the work of Simandl and increased the technique to work around the entire fingerboard, improving modern-day double bassists’ technique even more to play old and new concertos.

=== Development after the 20th century ===
Synthetic strings have gained a lot of popularity in the last 50 years. They have a lot of benefits, including they are vegan, have a more consistent tone, easier to play, and last longer on the bass. Some composers, of course, still prefer to find special effects on gut strings, but some companies have started making strings that sound exactly like gut strings, for example D’addario Zyex Strings.

== Challenges ==
The double bass has not been a popular choice for a solo instrument, mainly due to the difficulties of balancing the soloist and orchestra so that the former is not overshadowed by the orchestra's volume. The low register of the double bass makes it difficult to project; to help resolve this problem, many composers (most notably Bottesini) wrote solo parts in the high register of the instrument. Another solution is to refrain from large tuttis, or employ chamber orchestration, when the double bass is playing in its lower register. Few major composers of the classical and romantic eras were disposed to writing double bass concerti, as there were few instrumentalists capable of taking on the demands of playing as a soloist; it was only through the efforts of virtuosos like Dragonetti, Bottesini, Koussevitsky, and Karr that the double bass began to be recognized as a solo instrument. As the twentieth century began, the standard of double bass technique improved by a significant degree, making it a more popular choice for composers.

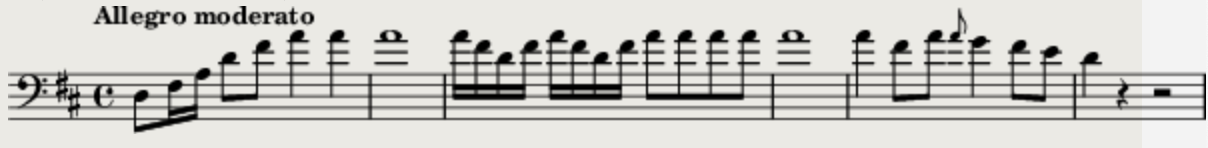
First six bars of solo bass part of Dittersdorf's Concerto for Double Bass No. 2. Note the arpeggiated passage in bar 3.

Double basses have changed since the 18th century, when the concerti by Wanhal, Dittersdorf, and Pichl were written. One difference concerns the fingerboard; bassists would tie old strings or cloth to make frets on their instrument, much like a viola da gamba. This is in contrast to the present day, where the bassist is in charge of tuning purely based on their left hand finger placement due to a lack of frets. Another factor that makes playing Classical-era concerti more difficult on a modern instrument is the tuning. Many concerti from the late 18th century from the Vienna region were intended for a bass tuned (low to high) D_{1}/F_{1}–A_{1}–D_{2}–F♯_{2}–A_{2} for a five-string bass. Four-string basses would omit the lowest string. This tuning used a D major arpeggio for the top four strings (or all the strings on a four-string bass), and this is the reason many concerti from this period are in that key. Some concerti are, however, in E♭, E, or even F major. In these situations, the bassist would tune the strings as needed, raising the pitch by as much as a minor third, possible due to the lower-tension gut strings from that period. The result was better balance: the other string instruments would have a duller, less resonant sound in E♭ major, while the bassist, reading a transposed part in D major, would have a more resonant tuning and the bass would project better. Certain passages from that time included fast arpeggios, which were relatively easy to execute with Viennese tuning. However, now that basses are tuned in fourths, (low to high) E_{1}–A_{1}–D_{2}–G_{2}, many of these Classical-era concerti are difficult to play. Dittersdorf's Concerto No. 2 (pictured at right) is an example of this. That passage could be played with a bass in Viennese tuning using only open strings and harmonics. In standard tuning, it is much harder to play, and can be executed in several different ways, each way having major challenges for either the left or right hand.

== Haydn's lost double bass concerto ==
The only surviving parts of Haydn’s missing double bass concerto are the first two measures. It is assumed that this concerto dates back around 1763, around 2 years after Haydn was hired as a full-time composer for the Prince’s Orchestra. Haydn wrote it specifically for the second bassoonist that also played double bass in the orchestra, Johann Georg Schwenda. Typical to the time, this concerto was written in D major, for Viennese-tuned double basses. Sam Suggs, a double bassist and composer, took the first two measures Haydn wrote and completed the rest of the piece in the style of Haydn. He calls it Haydn [Re]Creation: Reviving the Lost Concerto. He took the small melody Haydn wrote and made different permutations throughout the three movements. Suggs has not yet published this work, but performed it at the International Society of Bassists Convention in 2019 in Bloomington, Indiana.

== Selected list ==
- Carl Ditters von Dittersdorf (1739–1799)
  - Concerto in E♭ major
  - Concerto No. 2 in E Major
- Johann Baptist Wanhal (1739–1813)
  - Double Bass Concerto in E♭ major (pub. 1969)
- Johannes Matthias Sperger (1750–1812)
  - Double Bass Concerto No. 2 in E♭ major
  - Double Bass Concerto No. 3 in B♭ major
  - Double Bass Concerto No. 4 in F major
  - Double Bass Concerto No. 5 in E♭ major
  - Double Bass Concerto No. 7 in A major
  - Double Bass Concerto No. 8 in E♭ major
  - Double Bass Concerto No. 9 in E♭ major
  - Double Bass Concerto No. 10 in E♭ major
  - Double Bass Concerto No. 11 in B♭ major
  - Double Bass Concerto No. 15 in D major
  - Double Bass Concerto No. 17 in B♭ major
  - Double Bass Concerto No. 18 in C minor
- Anton Zimmermann (1741–1781)
  - Concerto No. 1 in D major
  - Concerto No. 2 in D major
- Wenzel Pichl (1741–1805)
  - Concerto in D major
- Karl Kohaut (1726–1784)
  - Concerto in D major
- Franz Anton Hoffmeister (1754–1812)
  - Concerto No. 1 in D major
  - Concerto No. 2 in D major
  - Concerto No. 3 in D major
- Antonio Capuzzi (1755–1818)
  - Concerto in D (F) major
- Domenico Dragonetti (1763–1846)
  - Concerto in G major, D. 290
  - Concerto in D dur
  - Concerto in A major No. 3
  - Concerto in A major No. 5
  - Concerto in A major (Nanny)
- Giovanni Bottesini (1821–1889)
  - Gran Concerto in F♯ minor
  - Concerto No. 2 in B minor
  - Concerto No. 3 in A major (concerto di bravura)
- Serge Koussevitsky (1874–1951)
  - Double Bass Concerto in F♯ minor, Op. 3 (1902)
- Angel Mattias Peña
  - Concerto for Double Bass (1969)
- Konstatin Ivanov
  - Concerto in the Romantic Style
- Mauricio Annunziata
  - Concerto No. 1 for Double Bass and Orchestra "Argentino", Op. 123
  - Concerto No. 2 for Double Bass and Orchestra "Afroargentino", Op. 125
  - Concerto No. 3 for Double Bass and Orchestra "Porteño", Op. 129
  - Concerto No. 4 for Double Bass and Orchestra "Popular", Op. 135
  - Concerto No. 5 for Double Bass and Orchestra "Andino", Op. 141
  - Sinfonia Concerto for Double Bass, Piano and Orchestra, Op. 137
- Georgi Conus
  - Concerto in h moll, Op. 29 (1910)
- Edouard Nanny
  - Concerto in E minor
- Nikos Skalkottas
  - Double Bass Concerto (1942)
- Eduard Tubin
  - Double Bass Concerto (1948)
- Stefan Boleslaw Poradowski
  - Double Bass Concerto (1929)
- Andrzej Cwojdziński
  - Concerto (1959)
- Serge Lancen
  - Concerto pur contrebasse et cordes
- Anatoly Bogatyrev
  - Double bass concerto (1964)
- František Hertl
  - Concerto for double bass (1957)
- Xavier Foley
  - Double bass concerto "Victory concerto"
- Andrés Martín
  - Double Bass Concerto (2012)
- Tan Dun
  - Double bass concerto "Wolf Totem"
- Luis Serrano Alarcón
  - Concerto for Double bass, Winds and Percussion (prem. 25 June 2022)
- Aldemaro Romero
  - Concierto risueño (2006)
- Hans Werner Henze
  - Double Bass Concerto (1966)
- Denis Grotsky
  - Double Bass Concerto (2009)
- Virgilio Mortari
  - Concerto per Franco Petracchi
- Nino Rota
  - Divertimento Concertante for double bass and orchestra (1968–1973)
- Henri Tomasi
  - Concerto for Double Bass (1970)
- Gordon Jacob
  - Concerto for Double Bass (1972)
- Friedrich Schenker
  - Double Bass Concerto (1973)
- Jean Françaix
  - Concerto for double bass and orchestra (1974)
- Einojuhani Rautavaara
  - Angel of Dusk, concerto for double bass and orchestra (1980)
- Wilfred Josephs
  - Double Bass Concerto Op. 118 (1980)
- Jiří Hudec
  - Burleska for double bass and orchestra (1981)
- Juliusz Łuciuk
  - Concerto for Double Bass and Orchestra (1986)
- Kurt Schwertsik
  - Double Bass Concerto Op. 56 (1989)
- Gennady Lyashenko
  - Concerto for Double bass and chamber orchestra (1989)
- Peter Maxwell Davies
  - Strathclyde Concerto No. 7 for Double Bass and Orchestra (1992)
- Harald Genzmer
  - Concerto for Kontrabass and String Orchestra (1996)
- Raymond Luedeke
  - Concerto for Double Bass and Orchestra (1997)
- Ståle Kleiberg
  - Double bass Concerto (1999)
- Edgar Meyer
  - Concerto in D for Double Bass and Orchestra (2002)
- Robin Holloway
  - Concerto for Double Bass and Small Orchestra Op. 83 (2002)
- Kalevi Aho
  - Double Bass Concerto (2005)
- Anthony Ritchie
  - Whalesong (2006)
- Katarzyna Brochocka
  - Double Bass concerto (2007)
- Dai Fujikura
  - Double Bass Concerto (2010)
- Rolf Martinsson
  - Double Bass Concerto
- Andrés Martín
  - Double Bass concerto (2012)
- Edward Kravchuk
  - Concerto for Double Bass, Drum set, Piano and Strings (2014)
- Thomas Goss
  - Double Bass Concerto in E Minor
- Behzad Ranjbaran
  - Concerto for Double Bass and Orchestra (2018)
- Arda Ardaşes Agoşyan
  - Concerto for Double Bass and a cappella choir (Romeo and Juliet)
- Pere Valls i Duran
  - Gran Concert Obligat
- Fredrik Högberg
  - "Hitting the First Base" Concerto for Double Bass and Strings
- Missy Mazzoli
  - Dark with Excessive Bright (2018)

== See also ==
- List of compositions for double bass
