= Červený Újezd =

Červený Újezd may refer to places in the Czech Republic:

- Červený Újezd (Benešov District), a municipality and village in the Central Bohemian Region
- Červený Újezd (Prague-West District), a municipality and village in the Central Bohemian Region
- Červený Újezd, a village and part of Hrobčice in the Ústí nad Labem Region
- Červený Újezd, a village and part of Zbůch in the Plzeň Region
