= Gary Karr =

American double bassist (1941–2025)

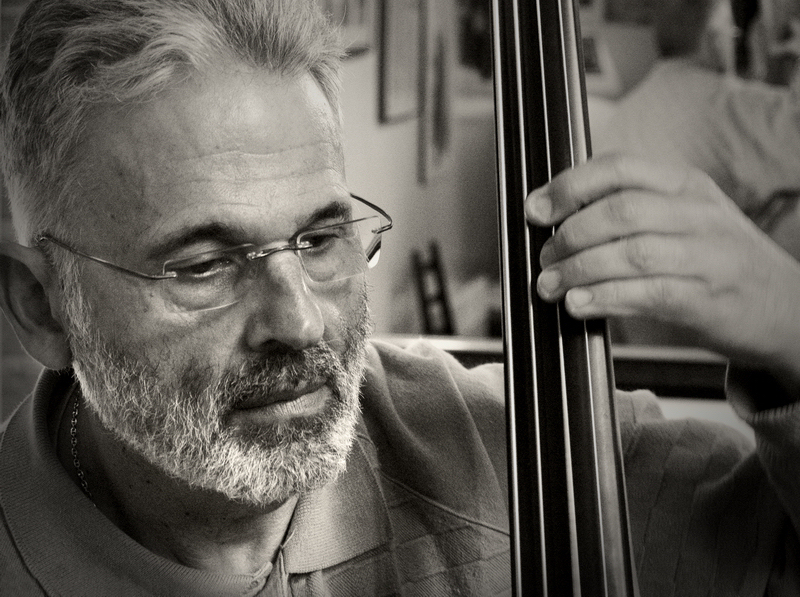
- Born: November 20, 1941; Los Angeles, California, U.S.
- Died: July 16, 2025 (aged 83); Victoria, British Columbia, Canada
- Occupations: Classical double bassist; Academic teacher
- Organizations: Juilliard School; New England Conservatory of Music; The Hartt School; Yale University; Indiana University; International Society of Bassists
- Website: www.garykarr.com

Gary Michael Karr (November 20, 1941 – July 16, 2025) was an American classical double bass virtuoso and academic teacher. In the 1960s he pioneered the use of the double bass as a solo instrument and new compositions were written for it. The Times said he was to the double bass "what Segovia was to the classical guitar". His playing was described as singing "with all the richness of the cello, the warmth of the viola and the agility of the violin". He performed with orchestras worldwide and founded the International Society of Bassists in 1976.

== Life and career ==
=== Early life and education ===
Karr was born Gary Michael Kornbleit in Los Angeles on November 20, 1941, into a Jewish family of Lithuanian descent. His father Joe Kornbleit, who changed the family name, worked in a shoe shop; his mother Miriam (nee Nadel) was an oboist. A younger sister played the harp. Seven generations of his ancestors had been double bass players but he was not encouraged to go into music, and in an interview he said he had no contact with the professional bassists in his family. His parents tried to steer him into a career in medicine. He was first taught by his grandfather's friend, Uda Demenstein, and at age nine started learning on a one-eighth size instrument which was a family heirloom.

Karr began playing in an orchestra as a child with violinist Jack Benny. He attended Fairfax High School in Los Angeles and in 1959 gave a recital which included the bass recitative from the finale of Beethoven's Ninth Symphony. He won a scholarship to the Juilliard School in New York, where he performed in the US premiere of Henze's opera 'Elegy for Young Lovers'. He studied at the University of Southern California; at the Juilliard School in New York City his major teachers included Herman Reinshagen and Stuart Sankey.

=== Playing ===
Karr's breakthrough came in 1962 when he was featured as a soloist in a nationally televised New York Philharmonic Young People's Concert, conducted by Leonard Bernstein. On that telecast Karr performed "The Swan" from The Carnival of the Animals by Saint-Saëns. Bernstein, introducing him, said that at the age of twenty Karr was already "a master of this instrument". Karr played two years later at Wigmore Hall in London, performing Bach, Boccherini and Paganini's 'Moses Fantasy'. He appeared as a soloist with orchestras internationally, including the Chicago Symphony Orchestra, London Symphony Orchestra, London Philharmonic Orchestra, Montreal Symphony Orchestra, Hong Kong Philharmonic Orchestra, Simón Bolívar Symphony Orchestra, Jerusalem Symphony Orchestra, Oslo Philharmonic, Zurich Chamber Orchestra, and with the major orchestras of Australia.

Karr premiered works written for him by Vittorio Giannini (Psalm CXX), Alec Wilder (Double bass Sonata, Suite for double bass and guitar), Robert Xavier Rodriguez (Ursa, Four Seasons for double bass and orchestra), and the double bass concertos by Gunther Schuller, Hans Werner Henze, John Downey and Ketil Hvoslef. He commissioned works from such composers as Wilfred Josephs, Joseph Horovitz and Lalo Schifrin. In 1966 he recorded as a duet a difficult neo-romantic concerto for double bass by Henze with the English Chamber Orchestra. He recorded Koussevitzky's Double bass Concerto with the Oslo Philharmonic, among 90 recordings. He also made transcriptions and arrangements for his instrument.

=== Teaching ===
Karr taught double bass on the faculties of the Juilliard School, New England Conservatory of Music, The Hartt School, Yale University and Indiana University. He also taught at music schools such as the Halifax (Nova Scotia) Schools Music Program, the University of Wisconsin and publicly funded schools, and published a number of instructional books for the double bass, including for beginners. When teaching, he focused on each player finding a unique sound on the double bass, and playing with the lyrical emphasis of a singer.

=== Foundations ===
In 1967 Karr founded the International Society of Bassists (ISB), an organization devoted to the study, promotion and advancement of double bass playing around the world. The ISB, with a membership of more than 3,000 double bass performers, teachers, students, and aficionados in more than 40 countries, hosts an international conference every two years to further these goals.

In 2005, Karr donated his primary instrument, the Karr-Koussevitzky bass, to the ISB. This instrument had been given to Karr by Olga Koussevitzky, Koussevitzky's widow, in 1961. It is the intention of the ISB to make this valuable instrument available for use by double bassists worldwide. The Karr-Koussevitzky bass was once believed to have been made by the Amati family and is also referred to as the Amati bass.

The non-profit Karr Double Bass Foundation, which loans instruments to promising young double bassists to assist in their professional development, was established by Karr in 1983.

=== Personal life and death ===
Karr was featured in two BBC documentaries: The Great Double Bass Race in 1978 and Amazing Bass in 1984. After 40 years as a concert artist, he retired in 2001 to Victoria, British Columbia, where he lived with his dog Shin-Ju, and his husband and accompanist Harmon Lewis, who died on January 11, 2023.

Gary Karr died from a brain aneurysm in Victoria, British Columbia, on July 16, 2025, at the age of 83. He also had cancer at the time of his death.
