= List of compositions by Johann Baptist Wanhal =

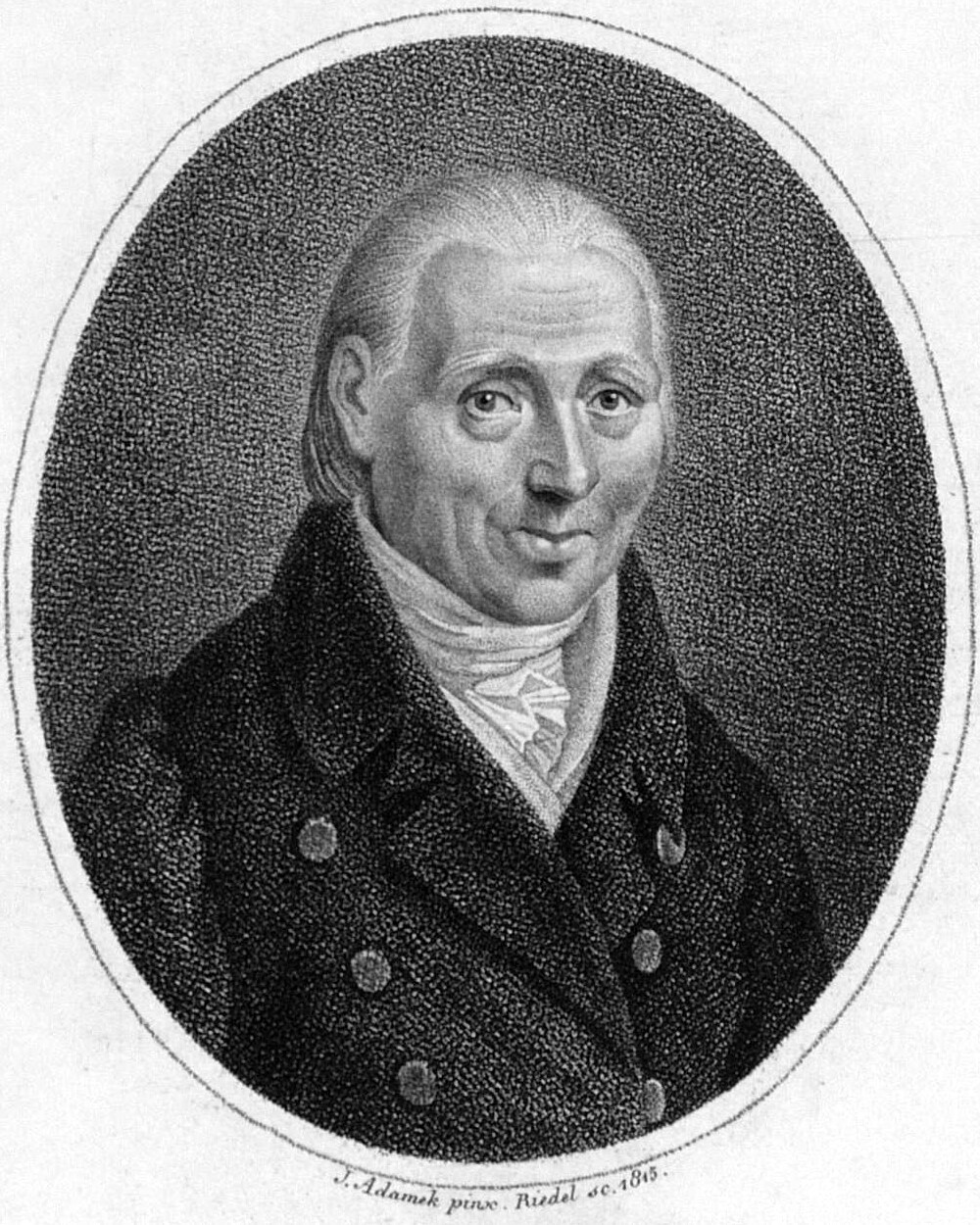
Johann Baptist Wanhal

This is a list of compositions by Johann Baptist Wanhal.

== Concertos ==
=== Published ===
- 4 Sinfonie Concertanti (Paris, 1775)
- "A favourite" Concerto for the German Flute or Violin (London, c.1775)
- 6 Harpsichord Concertos:
  - Concerto for Harpsichord No. 1 (Wien, 1785)
  - Concerto for Harpsichord No. 2 (London, 1788)
  - Concerto for Harpsichord No. 3 (London, 1788)
  - Concerto for Harpsichord No. 4 (Offenbach, 1789)
  - Concerto for Harpsichord No. 5 (Mainz, 1780)
  - Concerto for Harpsichord No. 6 (Wien, 1808)
- 1 Concertino for Harpsichord (Wien, s.a.)
- 3 Concertos for Flute (Bailleux, Paris, c.1782):
  - Flute Concerto No. 1 in A major
  - Flute Concerto No. 2 in B♭ major
  - Flute Concerto No. 3 in E major / E♭ major
- 2 Viola Concertos:
  - Concerto for Viola in C major (Prague: Artia/Supraphon 1973 ed V. Blazek & J. Plichta Musica Viva Historica No. 10)
  - Concerto for Viola in F major (Vienna: Doblinger, c.1978. ed Weinmann, Alexander, Karl Trotzmuller)

=== Manuscripts ===
- Concerto for Harpsichord and Violin
- Concertos for Harpsichord (or Piano) (the exact number of which is still unknown)
- 2 Concertos for Harpsichord (or Organ)
- Organ Concerto
- Concerto for 2 Violins
- 5 Violin Concertos
- 2 Concertos for Cello:
  - Cello Concerto in C major (WeiV IId:C1 - Possibly the same work as Viola Concerto in C)
  - Cello Concerto in A major
- 2 Concertos for Flute:
  - Flute Concerto No. 1 in D major (MS.1, WeiV IIe:D1, Lund University Library; now publ. Artaria)
  - Flute Concerto No. 2 in E♭ major (MS.2, WeiV IIe:Eb1, The Danish Royal Library Mu.6304.2368; now publ. Artaria)
- 2 Concertos for Viola (see also Published section):
  - Viola Concerto in F major (c.1785) [original version for Bassoon and orchestra (c.1780), transcription by the composer-
  - Viola Concerto in C major (WeiV IId:C1 - Possibly the same work as Cello Concerto in C)
- Double Bass Concerto (1773) (played in D major, E major or E♭ major)
- Clarinet Concerto, originally Flute Concerto IIe:C1 (ed. G. Balassa and M. Berlész: Budapest, 1972)
- Concerto for 2 Bassoons in F major (ed. H. Voxman: Monteux, 1985), also attributed to Zimmermann
- Bassoon Concerto in С major (piano score arr. by K.M. Schwamberger: Hamburg, 1964)
- Bassoon Concerto in С major No. 2 (pub. Hans-Peter Vogel, 2016)
- Bassoon Concerto in F major, WeiV IIi:F2 (published in Diletto musicale, No. 537, Vienna, 1978)
- 2 Oboe Concertos in F major and C Major (Schloss Wallerstein, c. 1770)

== Symphonies ==
Wanhal left 51 published symphonies. There are also another 81 symphonies which are preserved only in manuscripts. [according to the catalogue published by Civra Ferruccio, Turin 1985]. Even though the modern actual French spelling of Symphonie Périodique is Symphonie Périodique, the original 18th century French title of such works was Simphonie Periodique, as it can be seen on the 18th century frontispiece of Wanhal's published symphonies "a Amsterdam chez J.J. Hummel, Marchand & Imprimeur de Musique".

=== Published ===
- 4 Symphonies, Op. 10 (Paris, 1771–72)
- 3 Symphonies, Op. 10 (Paris, 1773)
- 3 Symphonies, Op. 16 (Paris, 1773)
- 2 Symphonies, Op. 17 (Paris, 1773)
- 1 Symphony (Paris, 1778)
- 3 Symphonies, Op. 10 (Amsterdam, ca. 1783)
- 1 Symphony, Op. 10 (Offenbach, s.a.)
- 34 Symphonies Périodiques (Amsterdam)

=== Selection of best known symphonies ===
- Symphony in A major, Bryan A2
- Symphony In A major, Bryan A4
- Symphony in A major, Bryan A9
- Symphony in A minor, Bryan a1
- Symphony in A minor, Bryan a2
- Symphony in A♭ major, Bryan As1
- Symphony in B♭ major, Bs1
- Symphony in B♭ major, Bs3
- Symphony in C major, Bryan C1
- Symphony in C major, Bryan C3
- Symphony in C major (Comista), Bryan C11
- Symphony in C major, Bryan C17
- Symphony in C minor, Bryan c2
- Symphony in D major, Bryan D2
- Symphony in D major, Bryan D4
- Symphony in D major, Bryan D17
- Symphony in D minor, Bryan d1
- Symphony in D minor, Bryan d2
- Symphony in E minor, Bryan e1
- Symphony in E minor, Bryan e3
- Symphony in E♭ major, Bryan Es1
- Symphony in F major, Bryan F5
- Symphony in G major, Bryan G6
- Symphony in G major, Bryan G8
- Symphony in G major, Bryan G11
- Symphony in G minor, Bryan g1
- Symphony in G minor, Bryan g2

== Chamber music ==
- 6 Viola Sonatas (4 as Op. 5, 2 others in E♭ major and G major)
- 3 Violin Sonatas, Op. 43:
  - Sonata No. 1 in G major
  - Sonata No. 2 in B♭ major
  - Sonata No. 3 in D minor
- 6 Violin Sonatas (WeiV Xa:8-13)
- String Trios:
  - 6 Sonatas for 2 Violins and Cello, Op. 12
    1. Sonata in B♭ major
    2. Sonata in F minor
    3. Sonata in A major
    4. Sonata in E major
    5. Sonata in G major
    6. Sonata in E♭ major
  - 6 Sonatas for 2 Violins and Cello Op. 17 (c.1780)
- Clarinet Sonatas
  - Clarinet Sonata in C Major
  - Clarinet Sonata in B♭ Major
- Piano Trios:
  - Trio Op. 20 No. 1
  - Trio Op. 20 No. 2
  - Trio Op. 20 No. 3
  - Trio Op. 20 No. 5 for clarinet, violin and piano
- 3 Piano Quartets:
  - Piano Quartet in E♭ major, Op. 40 No. 1
  - Piano Quartet in G major, Op. 40 No. 2
  - Piano Quartet in B♭ major, Op. 40 No. 3
- 6 Oboe (or Flute) Quartets, Op. 7 (1771):
  - Quartet No. 1 in F major
  - Quartet No. 2 in B♭ major
  - Quartet No. 3 in G major
  - Quartet No. 4 in E♭ major
  - Quartet No. 5 in A major
  - Quartet No. 6 in C major
- Caper Quartet:
  - Caper Quartet in G major, Op. 4 No. 1
- String Quartets:
  - String Quartet in E♭ major, WoO
  - 6 String Quartets, Op. 6
  - 6 String Quartets, Op. 13
  - 6 String Quartets, Op. 21
- String Quintets, for 2 Violins, 2 Violas and Cello (RISM A/I:V362) (1774):
  - Quintet No. 1 in D major
  - Quintet No. 2 in E♭ major
  - Quintet No. 3 in G major
  - Quintet No. 4 in F major
  - Quintet No. 5 in G major
  - Quintet No. 6 in D major

== Operas ==
These works were written during Wanhal's journey to Italy, where they were written after he had met Florian Gassmann. Sources do not agree whether Wanhal wrote the operas in their entirety, or merely supplied arias to operas by Gassmann. Both works are lost.

- Il Demofoonte (Metastasio; Roma, 1770)
- Il trionfo di Clelia (Metastasio; Roma, 1770)

== Sacred music ==
=== Published ===
- 2 Masses (C major and G major, Wien, s.a.)
- 2 Offertories (Wien, s.a.)
- Pange Lingua (Wien, s.a.)
- IV breves et faciles Hymni in honorem SS. Altari Sacramenti (Wien, s.a.)

=== Manuscripts ===
- 58 Masses:
  - (MS 1-G major Missa Pastoralis ca. 1782: Weinmann XIX: G4, Austrian National Library Mus.Hs.926)
  - (MS 2-C major Missa Solemnis ca. 1778: Weinmann XIX: C7, Austrian National Library Mus.Hs.22290)
  - Both the Masses are now publ. Artaria.
- 1 Credo
- Kyrie and Gloria
- 54 Offertories
- 16 Salve Regina
- 10 litanies
- 14 motets
- Stabat Mater
- Te Deum
- Tantum ergo
- Pange Lingua
- Quatro stationi
- Sacrum Solenne
- 31 arias
