= Double Bass Concerto (Wanhal) =

Musical composition by Johann Baptist Wanhal

- by Johann Baptist Wanhal
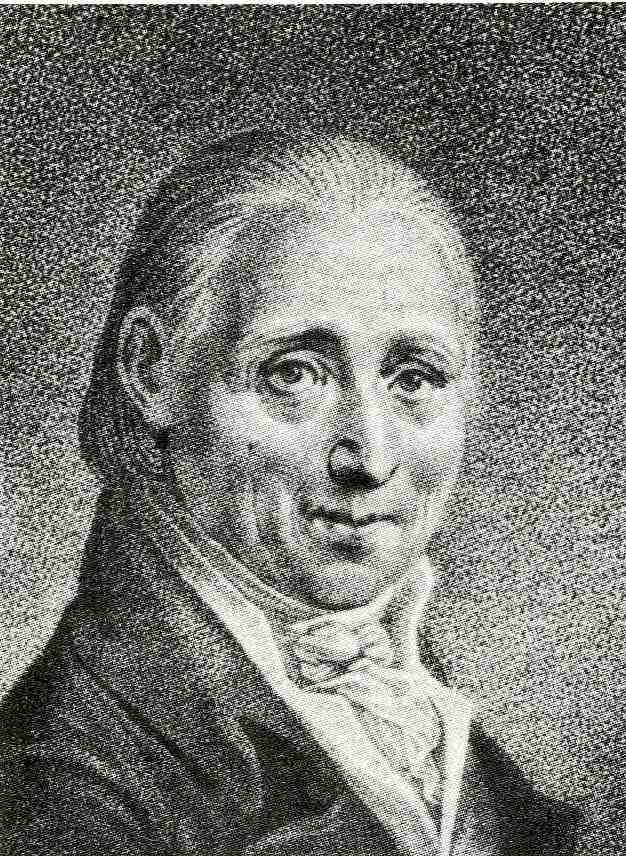
- The composer
- Key: E♭ major
- Period: Classical
- Composed: 1773
- Duration: 20 minutes
- Movements: 3

Premiere
- Date: 1969
- Location: Vienna

The Double Bass Concerto in E♭ major is a composition for double bass and orchestra by Johann Baptist Wanhal. The piece runs approximately 20 minutes.

== Background ==
Wanhal's concerto is dated as the third major double bass concerto, behind Haydn's lost concerto, and Dittersdorf's concerto. The date of the work's composition is not known, but it is speculated to have been finished in 1773. No original manuscripts have been found in Wanhal's handwriting, but a version by an unknown copyist was found in the estate of bassist Johann Matthias Sperger. It is speculated that Sperger was the composer's intended performer of the concerto.

The concerto was originally written in the key of E♭ major for basses tuned in the standard Viennese tuning (A, F♯, D, A, F) of the time. In modern performances, the work is transposed down a semi tone to D major or three semi tones to C major.

== Structure ==
In typical concerto form, the work contains three movements:

1. Allegro moderato
2. Adagio
3. Allegro

== Recordings ==
- Rinat Ibragimov (musician) Double Bass, April 1, 2011.
- Budapest Festival Orchestra, Gábor Takács-Nagy Conductor, January 5, 2016.
- Detroit Symphony Orchestra, Kevin Brown Double Bass, March 1, 2017.
