= Double Bass Concerto (Koussevitzky) =

Double bass concerto by Serge Koussevitzky

- by Serge Koussevitzky
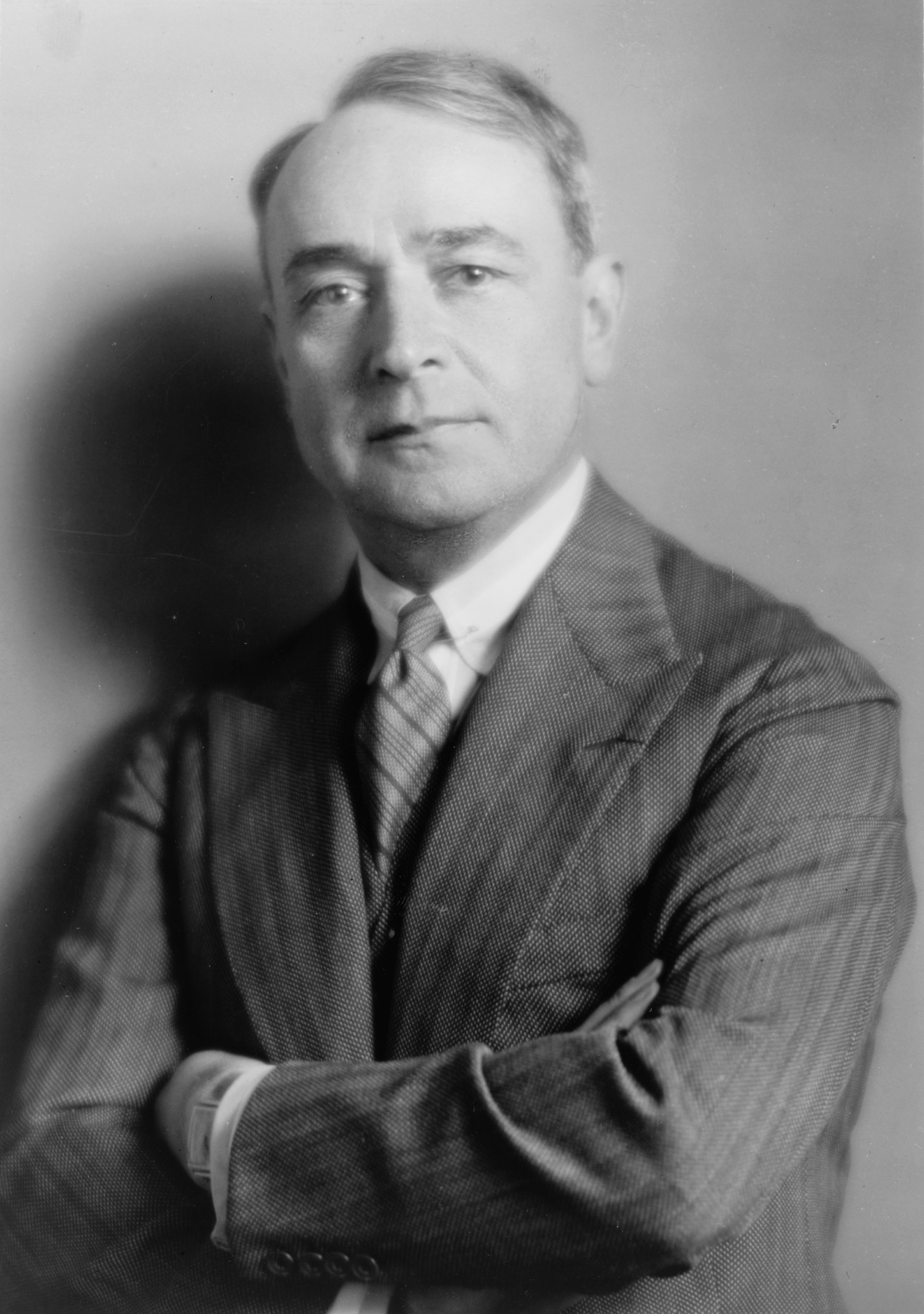
- Key: F♯ minor
- Opus: 3
- Period: Romantic
- Composed: 1902
- Movements: 3

Premiere
- Date: 1902

The Double Bass Concerto in F♯ minor, Op. 3, is a concerto for double bass and orchestra in three movements composed by Serge Koussevitzky in 1902.

== Creation ==
The concerto was composed in 1902 by Serge Koussevitzky. The composer dedicated the concerto to Natalie Ouchkoff, his fiancé, whom he married the year of the composition's premiere. The work's production came at a time of little repertoire for the double bass, which was often considered as an instrument only for ensembles. Some bassists argue that Koussevitzky did not write the entire concerto himself, instead receiving help from his friend, Reyngol’d Glière. But others argue that the concerto is tailored too closely to the double bass to have been written by someone who does not play the instrument. Olga Koussevitzky, his widow, remains adamant that the concerto was written entirely by him.

== Characteristics ==
Opening five bars of the solo part of the first movement.

The concerto was written as a long, single movement that is split into three sections with a tertiary (ABA) structure. It is written in the Russian bel canto style which began to appear at the beginning of the twentieth century. Its performance takes approximately 20 minutes from start to finish. Several sources of inspiration have been identified for the work, including a Dvorák Cello Concerto and a Tchaikovsky Opera. The work was written at the end of the romantic period but is still considered to be a prime example of Russian romanticism.

The first movement, marked allegro, makes an intense opening declaratory statement before taking on a lyrical melody. The movement ends with an attacca marking, moving straight into the second movement without pause. The second movement is marked with a significantly slower andante, in which the composer uses the instrument's middle and lower ranges. The third and final movement repeats the introductory theme verbatim, taking on the same allegro marking. This movement brings forward a new theme in its development, before ending abruptly.

The composition represents a range of technical challenges for the double bass. This includes triplet and sixteenth passages with ambiguous bowings and double stops, an uncommon feature in double bass repertoire.

== Premiere ==
Koussevitzky was the soloist in the world premiere of his concerto in Moscow on 25 February 1905 with the Moscow Symphony Orchestra. He later played it in Germany, Paris, and Boston. The first piano reductions of the work's accompaniment appeared in Moscow in 1906, with a later set following in Leipzig in 1910. Both editions, however, contained mistakes.

== Recordings ==
- Serge Koussevitzky, Double Bass 1929
- Rinat Ibragimov, Double Bass (2010)
- Luis Martin, Double Bass, Netherlands Philharmonic Orchestra (2021)
