= Isobel Dunlop =

Isobel Dunlop MBE
- Born: Isobel Violet Skelton Dunlop; March 14, 1901; Edinburgh, Scotland
- Died: May 12, 1975 (aged 74); Haddington, East Lothian
- Occupations: Composer, music teacher, concert organiser
- Employer: Scottish Arts Council
- Known for: Co-founding the Saltire Music Group

Isobel Violet Skelton Dunlop MBE (14 March 1901 – 12 May 1975) was a Scottish composer, music teacher, concert organiser, and co-founder of the Saltire Music Group and the Saltire Singers.

== Early life and education ==
Isobel Dunlop was born in Edinburgh, the daughter of Ellen Thompson and William Dunlop, company secretary. She was educated at Rothesay House, and Edinburgh University. She studied singing with Michael Poutiatine, violin with Camillo Ritter, and at Edinburgh with Donald Tovey and Hans Gál, before moving to London to become a pupil of George Dyson.

She taught at two notable girls' schools, Westonbirt and Downham.

== Career ==
Throughout her life, Dunlop worked both as a freelance composer, and performer, writing choral music, songs, and works for viola and piano. She worked as Assistant National Officer and Concert Organiser for the Scottish Arts Council between 1943 and 1948.

In 1950, with Hans Oppenheim, she founded the Saltire Music Group and the Saltire Singers, a vocal quartet. For them, she wrote various vocal and instrumental pieces and became well known for commissioning new works from the young Scottish composers. From 1949 until her retirement she was Secretary of the Saltire Music Group.

Her children’s opera, The Scarecrow, was performed in Malvern in 1955 and 1956 and other instrumental and choral were broadcast, including the one-act opera The Silhouette (1969, BBC Commission) and a Septet (1972, commissioned by John Noble). Her Fantasy String Quartet, depicting the four seasons, was commissioned by the University of Glasgow and performed at the 1972 McEwen Memorial concert. Her three movement Suite for cello and piano, described by Leah Broad as "embracing 'modern' directions of twentieth century music while remaining rooted in a tonal language", has been recorded by Alexandra Mackenzie and Ingred Sawyers.

Dunlop was appointed MBE for her services to music and the arts in Scotland.

== Death and legacy ==
Isobel Dunlop died in Haddington, East Lothian on 12 May 1975. A correspondent to The Times wrote:

Isobel Dunlop was by any standards a remarkable woman. As a composer her talent was considerable: so, too, was her ability to encourage and assist other, younger composers and musicians. It was through Isobel Dunlop that Hans Oppenheim came to Scotland and with him she created the Saltire Singers and developed the programmes of verse and music presented by the Saltire Music Group. She was not only the artistic inspiration for this work but quietly made it possible with her financial support. She instituted awards for young composers, commissioned works of music and poetry for performance at the festival and elsewhere, worked for Lamp of Lothian, the Edinburgh International Festival, the Scottish Arts Council, the BBC Music Committee and was for many years music secretary, latterly honorary president, of the Saltire Society.

In the Biographical Dictionary of Scottish Women, published in 2007, it was noted that:

Although she is best remembered for her work for the Saltire Society, in particular her founding of the Saltire Music Group and Saltire Singers, Isobel Dunlop's contribution as a composer deserves re-evaluation.

Her papers are held by the National Library of Scotland.
