= Saltire Music Group =

Scottish Ensemble

The Saltire Music Group or Saltire Singers were a Scottish musical group founded by composer Isobel Dunlop in 1950 for The Saltire Society and directed and conducted by Hans Oppenheim (1892–1965). In addition to performing traditional songs the group also commissioned and performed new works from Scottish composers.

== Discography ==
- Burns Night - Songs And Poems Of Robert Burns, with poetry readings by Ian Gilmour and Meta Forrest Angel Records ANG 35256 1956
  - Also released as An Evening With Robert Burns, Columbia Records 1956
- William Byrd Madrigals, Motets, & Anthems, The Saltire Singers Lyrichord LLST 7156 1966
- Scotland In The Festival - Songs And Poems Of Scotland, The Saltire Music Group SIF 01 1970
- John Dowland Music Of Love And Friendship, Saltire Singers with Desmond Dupré, Musical Heritage Society MHS 870
