= Rinat Ibragimov (musician) =

Russian musician (1960–2020)

Rinat Ibragimov (5 November 1960 – 2 September 2020) was a virtuoso Russian-Tatar classical double bassist, best known as the principal bass of the London Symphony Orchestra and for his solo performances and recordings.

== Education and competitions ==
After studying cello for ten years, Rinat Ibragimov switched to playing the double bass at age 16. He studied at the Ippolitov-Ivanov State Musical Pedagogical Institute in Moscow with Georgy Favorsky and at the Moscow Conservatory with Professor Evgeny Kolosov, where he also studied conducting with Dmitri Kitaenko.

He won first prize in the All-Soviet Union Student Competition in 1984 and in the Giovanni Bottesini International Competition in Parma, Italy in 1989.

== Orchestral and solo performances and teaching ==
He was principal double bass of the Bolshoi Theatre Orchestra, the Moscow Academy of Ancient Music, Moscow Soloists, and the Soloists of the Moscow Philharmonic from 1983 to 1997. Between 1991 and 1997 he was a double bass instructor at the Moscow State Tchaikovsky Conservatory and its Central Specialist Music School. From 1995 to 1998 he was artistic director and conductor of the Moscow Instrumental Capella.

From 1995 to 2014, he was principal bass of the London Symphony Orchestra. He taught at the Guildhall School from 1999 and began teaching at the Royal College of Music in 2007. He provided a video master class for prospective members of the YouTube Symphony Orchestra in 2008.

A noted soloist, he made a number of recordings and videos of solo bass repertoire, including a Bottesini album with Elena Filonova, Bach's Cello Suite No. 3, works by Hindemith, Mozart, Schubert, Schumann, and Richard Strauss, and concertos by Bottesini, Dittersdorf, Koussevitzky, Smirnov, and Wanhal.

== Health ==
Ibragimov suffered a stroke in 2014, leaving him unable to perform, though he continued teaching occasionally at the Guildhall School.

He died from COVID-19 on September 2, 2020.

== Family ==
Rinat's wife is Lutsia Ibragimova, his son is Timur Ibragimov and daughter is Russian violinist Alina Rinatovna Ibragimova MBE.
