= Sadie Harrison =

Sadie Harrison (born 1965) is an Australian-born composer, performer and academic.

== Early life and education ==
Harrison was born in Adelaide, Australia and moved to England in 1970. She studied composition to doctoral level at King's College, London under Nicola LeFanu and David Lumsdaine. Her music has been performed worldwide by ensembles including London Chamber Symphony, Bournemouth Sinfonietta, the Kreutzer Quartet and the Kaskados Trio. Harrison's music is published by the University of York Music Press. Coming from a household of musicians, her father brought Sadie and her family to Britain from Australia in 1970 to pursue a career as an opera singer. She learned the piano and violin as a child but did not take to the instruments with much enthusiasm.

== Career ==
Harrison was first introduced to modern classical music during a composition class at Surrey University and described it as "ridiculously emotive but honestly, it was like coming home. I wrote my first piece the same day, eventually played by the brilliant composer and clarinettist Sohrab Uduman, and from then I’ve been on my composing journey." From 2015 to 2016, Harrison worked on a substantial collaboration with US Ensemble Cuatro Puntos, for whom she is currently Artist-in-residence. The project resulted in a commission for string sextet and youth ensemble. The project was generously supported by two Arts Council England Grants for the Arts, a PRSF Women Make Music Award and others.
