= Červený Újezd (Benešov District) =

- Municipality
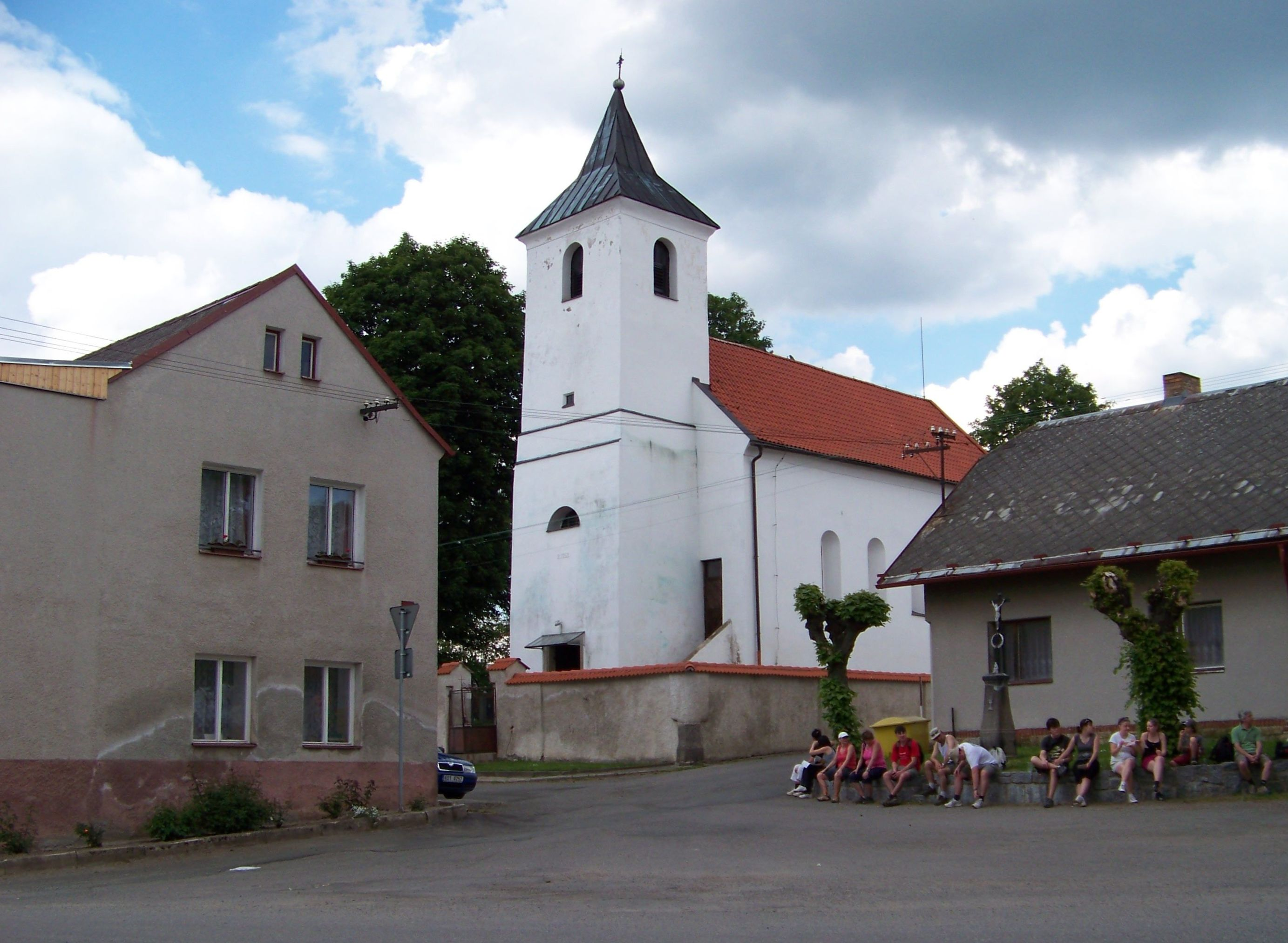
- Church of Saint Matthew

- Flag Coat of arms

- Location in the Czech Republic
- Coordinates: 49°33′20″N 14°36′15″E
- Country: Czech Republic
- Region: Central Bohemian
- District: Benešov
- First mentioned: 1352

Area
  - Total: 12.59 km^{2} (4.86 sq mi)
- Elevation: 590 m (1,940 ft)

Population (2026-01-01)
  - Total: 350
  - Density: 28/km^{2} (72/sq mi)
- Time zone: UTC+1 (CET)
  - Summer (DST): UTC+2 (CEST)
- Postal code: 257 88
- Website: www.obeccervenyujezd.cz

Červený Újezd is a municipality and village in Benešov District in the Central Bohemian Region of the Czech Republic. It has about 400 inhabitants.

== Administrative division ==
Červený Újezd consists of six municipal parts (in brackets population according to the 2021 census):

- Červený Újezd (210)
- Horní Borek (62)
- Milhostice (11)
- Nové Dvory (43)
- Styrov (16)
- Třetužel (8)

== Demographics ==
Historical population
Year	Pop.	±%
1869	789	—
1880	774	−1.9%
1890	738	−4.7%
1900	670	−9.2%
1910	682	+1.8%
1921	666	−2.3%
1930	609	−8.6%
1950	515	−15.4%
1961	495	−3.9%
1970	410	−17.2%
1980	354	−13.7%
1991	341	−3.7%
2001	303	−11.1%
2011	314	+3.6%
2021	350	+11.5%
Source: Censuses
