= Hans Oppenheim =

Conductor (1892–1965)

Hans Oppenheim (Berlin, 25 April 1892 – Edinburgh, 19 August 1965) was a German-born conductor. He was son of the Jewish German neurologist Hermann Oppenheim.

Oppenheim emigrated to England and was first assistant to Fritz Busch at Glyndebourne Opera from c. 1935; after Busch took from him the position of assistant conductor, he was director of the Dartington Hall Music Group, 1937–1945, then conductor of the English Opera Group, 1946, and associate conductor of the Glyndebourne Opera at the Edinburgh Festival, 1949, as well as co-founder of the Saltire Music Group in 1950 with Isobel Dunlop.
