= Červený Újezd (Prague-West District) =

- Municipality
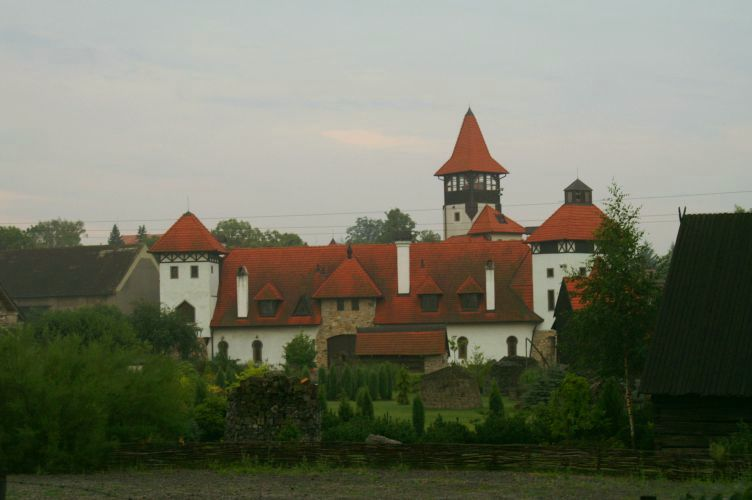
- Museum built as a castle

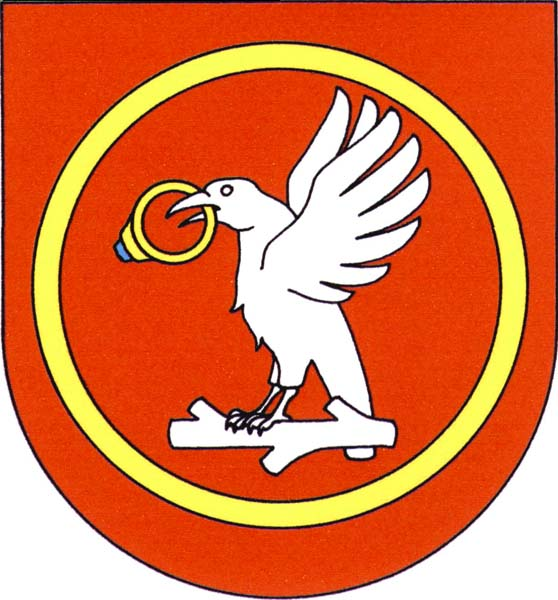
- Flag Coat of arms

- Location in the Czech Republic
- Coordinates: 50°4′11″N 14°9′58″E
- Country: Czech Republic
- Region: Central Bohemian
- District: Prague-West
- First mentioned: 1318

Area
  - Total: 5.34 km^{2} (2.06 sq mi)
- Elevation: 401 m (1,316 ft)

Population (2026-01-01)
  - Total: 1,650
  - Density: 309/km^{2} (800/sq mi)
- Time zone: UTC+1 (CET)
  - Summer (DST): UTC+2 (CEST)
- Postal code: 273 51
- Website: www.cervenyujezd.com

Červený Újezd is a municipality and village in Prague-West District in the Central Bohemian Region of the Czech Republic. It has about 1,700 inhabitants.

== Etymology ==
Újezd is a common Czech toponym. The prexif červený means 'red'.

== Geography ==
Červený Újezd is located about 11 km (7 mi) west of Prague. It lies in an agricultural landscape on the border between the Prague Plateau and Křivoklát Highlands.

== History ==
The first written mention of Červený Újezd is from 1318.

== Demographics ==
Historical population

Year	Pop.	±%
1869	746	—
1880	783	+5.0%
1890	828	+5.7%
1900	865	+4.5%
1910	1,004	+16.1%

Year	Pop.	±%
1921	910	−9.4%
1930	794	−12.7%
1950	729	−8.2%
1961	735	+0.8%
1970	729	−0.8%

Year	Pop.	±%
1980	684	−6.2%
1991	768	+12.3%
2001	763	−0.7%
2011	1,075	+40.9%
2021	1,533	+42.6%

Source: Censuses

== Transport ==
The railway line Prague-Dejvice–Kladno briefly passes through the municipal territory, but there is no train station.

== Sights ==
In the local part named Hájek is located a pilgrimage site with a Franciscan monastery. The oldest part of the early Baroque complex is a Loretan chapel, built in 1623–1625. The monastery was then added to the chapel in 1663–1681. Hájek is the destination of the pilgrimage starting in Prague-Břevnov.

In 2001, an artificial castle was built in Červený Újezd. It houses a museum, but it also serves cultural and social purposes. There is a small open-air museum in the castle's gardens. Near the castle is ArcadeHry gaming-house and a museum with more than 170 functional arcade video games.
