= Zbůch =

- Municipality
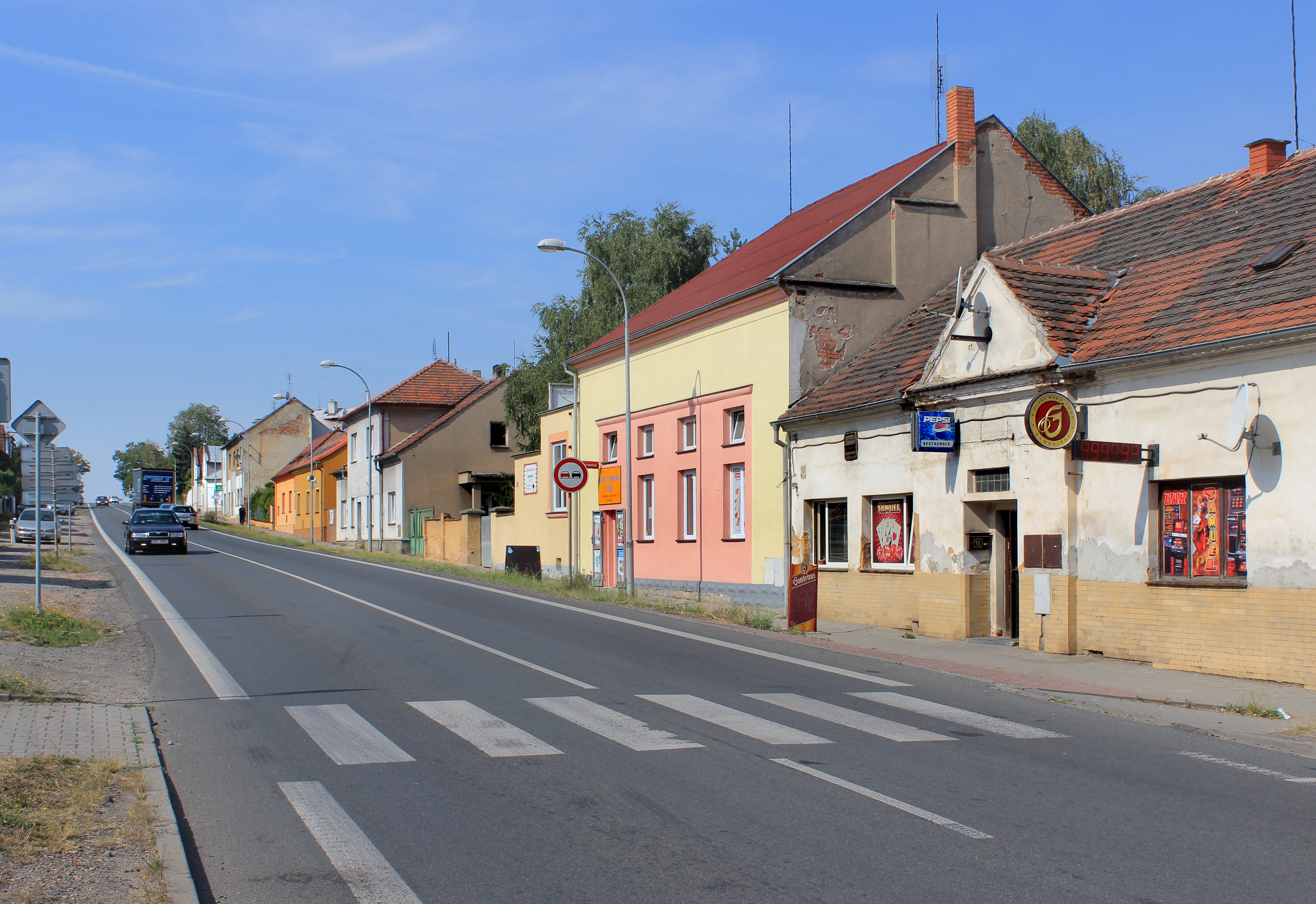
- Main street

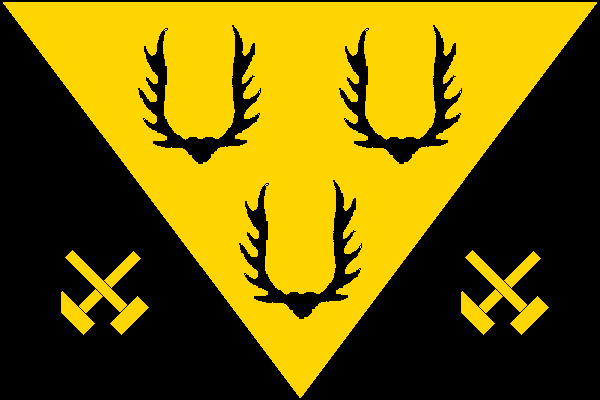
- Flag Coat of arms

- Location in the Czech Republic
- Coordinates: 49°40′43″N 13°13′33″E
- Country: Czech Republic
- Region: Plzeň
- District: Plzeň-North
- First mentioned: 1253

Area
  - Total: 8.57 km^{2} (3.31 sq mi)
- Elevation: 338 m (1,109 ft)

Population (2026-01-01)
  - Total: 3,057
  - Density: 357/km^{2} (924/sq mi)
- Time zone: UTC+1 (CET)
  - Summer (DST): UTC+2 (CEST)
- Postal code: 330 22
- Website: www.zbuch.cz

Zbůch (Czech pronunciation: [ˈzbuːx]; German: Zwug) is a municipality and village in Plzeň-North District in the Plzeň Region of the Czech Republic. It has about 3,100 inhabitants.

== Administrative division ==
Zbůch consists of two municipal parts (in brackets population according to the 2021 census):

- Zbůch (2,620)
- Červený Újezd (104)

== Etymology ==
The origin of the name Zbůch is uncertain. It was probably derived from the Old Czech zbóh, zbuoh (in modern Czech zbůhdarma), meaning 'in vain'.

== Geography ==
Zbůch is located about 11 kilometres (7 mi) southwest of Plzeň. It lies in the Plasy Uplands. The terrain is flat to slightly undulating. The highest point is at 387 m (1,270 ft) above sea level.

== History ==
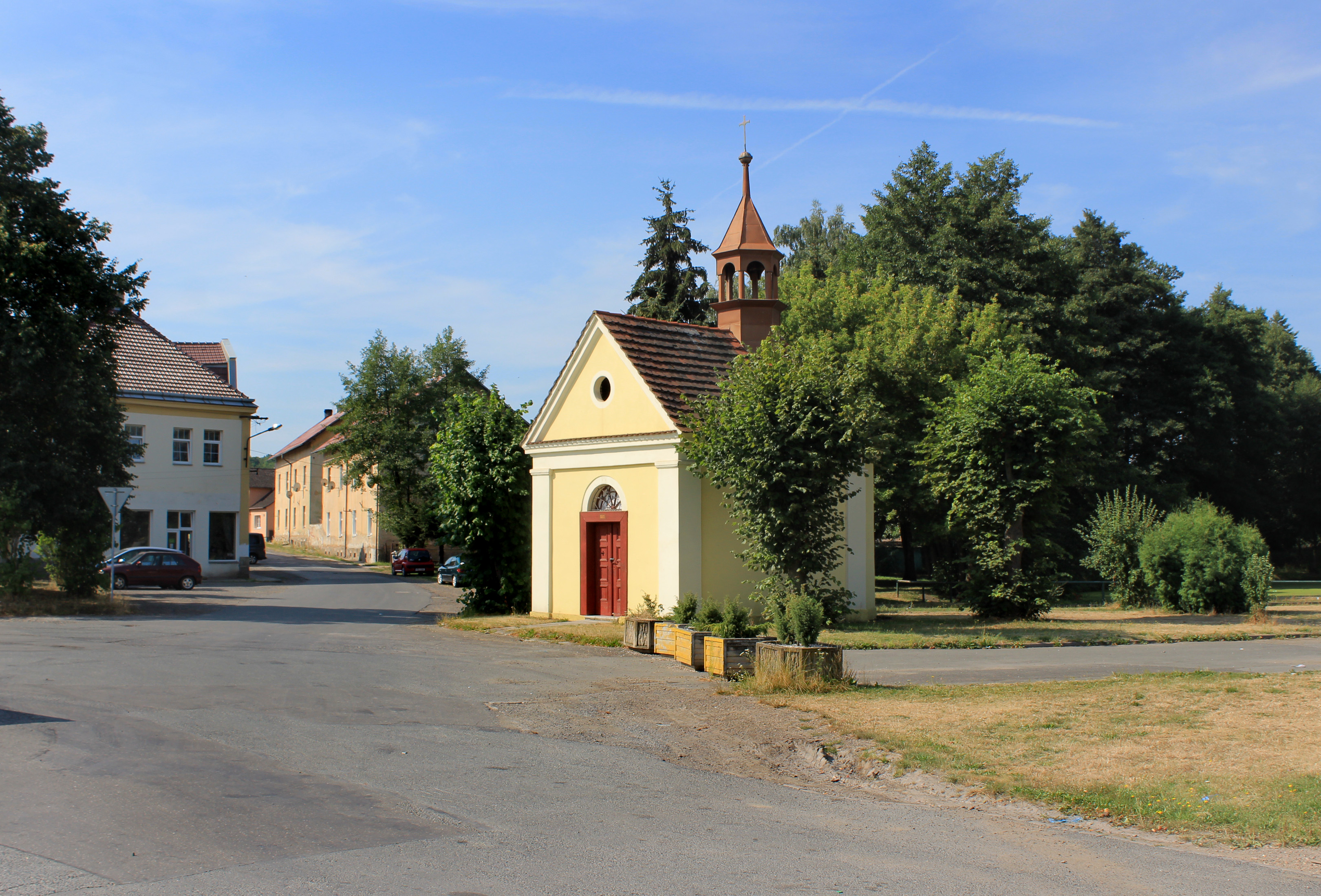
Common in Zbůch

=== Early history ===
The first written mention of Zbůch is from 1253, when it was cited as a property of the Premonstratensian monastery in Chotěšov. However, the settlement is thought to have its roots in prehistoric times, as evidenced by numerous archaeological finds in the area dating from the Bronze Age. During the Middle Ages, the area was established farmyard that was owned by a number of secular feudal lords, such as Velek of Zbůch or Votík of Chotěšovice during the 15th century. Shortly after the 17th century, tax records state that only five farmers lived in the village. The last feudal lords, whose family farmed Zbůch until the first land reform, built a large manor house on the northern outskirts of the village. The site is still partially preserved. Records from the 19th century suggest the village consisted of 28 houses. In 1861 a railway line from Plzeň to Brod was built near the village, however, a railway station for the village was not opened until 1906.

=== 20th century ===
By the end of the 19th century, Zbůch was a small agricultural village connected to the nearby parish of Úhercům. The village consisted of a small village square lined with farmhouses, which was dominated by the chapel. In the first 20 years of the 20th century, the population increased from the original few dozen to about two thousand by 1921. This population boom was due to the development of the coal mines on the edge of the village. In January 1919, the first general school was established in Zbůch. By 1932, after many delays, a fully functional school building was built in the village. By the mid-1920s, the village had built a town hall with a memorial statue of president Tomáš Garrigue Masaryk out front.

In October 1938, following the Munich Agreement, Zbůch was ceded to the Nazi Germany, along with other lands in the Sudetenland region. Although there were many Czech/non-Germans living in the village who migrated there to work the coal mines, the village was considered German and subject to the Munich Agreement. Many Czech miners were forced into early retirement to accommodate large numbers of French and later Russian prisoners of war which were interned here. At the beginning of 1945, U.S. tanks liberated the area from Nazi occupation on their way to meet with Russian allies in Torgau. After the war the region was ceded to the new Czechoslovakia. Most ethnic Germans were forcibly removed and resettled within the newly established borders of Germany.

In the period after February 1948, the communist government took state ownership of the mine and collectivised the local peasant labor force. The former camp was gradually transformed into a hostel. Although part of the area works was acquired by private individuals. The pub near the railway station was built to house a cultural hall, which became the largest facility of its kind in Plzeň-North District. Since 1990 the private companies have transformed the mining facilities for the production of precast concrete, interlocking tiles, and several other products. Several apartment buildings were built near the concrete plant and near the football field in the centre of the village. In recent times the northern and eastern side of the village square was demolished and planning for the site includes a small mall.

=== Červený Újezd ===
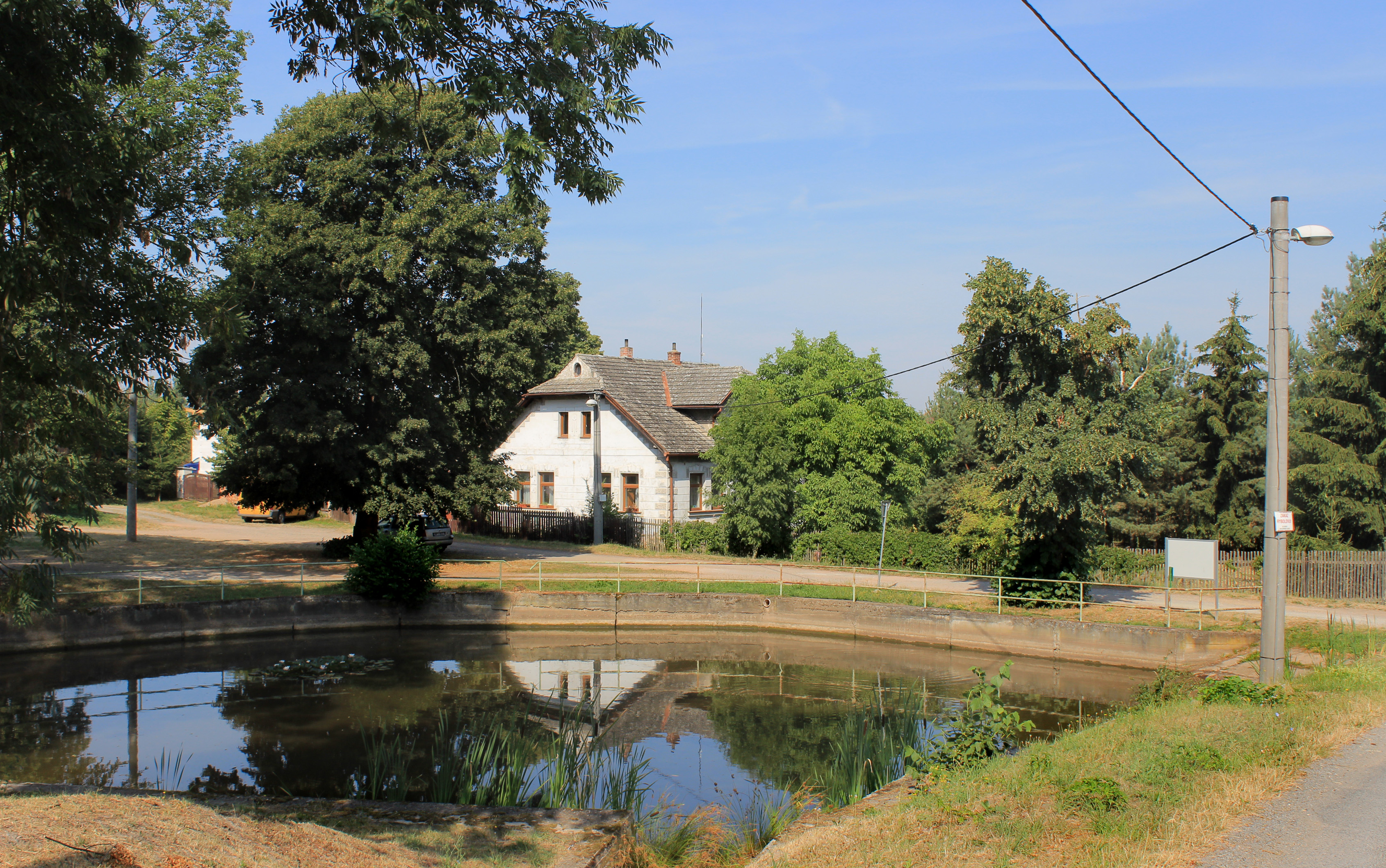
A pond in Červený Újezd

The nearby small village of Červený Újezd is now part of the municipality of Zbůch. The first written mention of this village is in the property listing of the Kladruby monastery dating from 1115. Later the village became the property of the monastery in the neighbouring Chotěšov. In the late 18th century, the village consisted of 16 residential listings. In October 1938, the village was annexed by Nazi Germany along with Zbůch. After the war, the local ethnic Germans were expelled and replaced by settlers from the Plzeň region as well as the Czechoslovakia's interior. The village has retained its historic village square, with a chapel and several valuable estates. Address No. 2 is a unique residential timbered house dating from 1773. At the beginning of the 1950s, a military airfield was built in the woods above the village.

=== Mining activities ===
The Western Bohemia Mining stock club was built in 1906–1908 on the eastern outskirts of the village, between Zbůch and the nearby village of Červený Újezd. The site has two deep mining pits (800 and 720 m) of exceptional quality coal, used in the manufacturing of gas and coke, and also in the chemical industry. After 1918 the original name was changed to Masaryk Jubilee mine in honour of Tomáš Garrigue Masaryk, the first President of Czechoslovakia. This name lasted until 1948, with an exception during World War II when the name was temporarily changed to the Adolf Hitler mine. The mining of coal significantly increased the size of the village during the early 20th century. At one time the mine was among the largest buildings of its kind in the Plzeň Region. After 1948, Masaryk Jubilee was renamed the Jubilee Mine Pit Defenders of Peace. Mining operations ceased in 1977. The area around the former mine has become an industrial zone.

== Demographics ==
Historical population

Year	Pop.	±%
1869	347	—
1880	361	+4.0%
1890	424	+17.5%
1900	473	+11.6%
1910	1,382	+192.2%

Year	Pop.	±%
1921	2,248	+62.7%
1930	2,441	+8.6%
1950	2,180	−10.7%
1961	2,537	+16.4%
1970	2,330	−8.2%

Year	Pop.	±%
1980	2,171	−6.8%
1991	1,829	−15.8%
2001	1,864	+1.9%
2011	2,257	+21.1%
2021	2,724	+20.7%

Source: Censuses

== Transport ==
The I/26 road from Plzeň to Domažlice runs through the municipality.

Zbůch is located on the railway line Plzeň–Domažlice.

== Sights ==
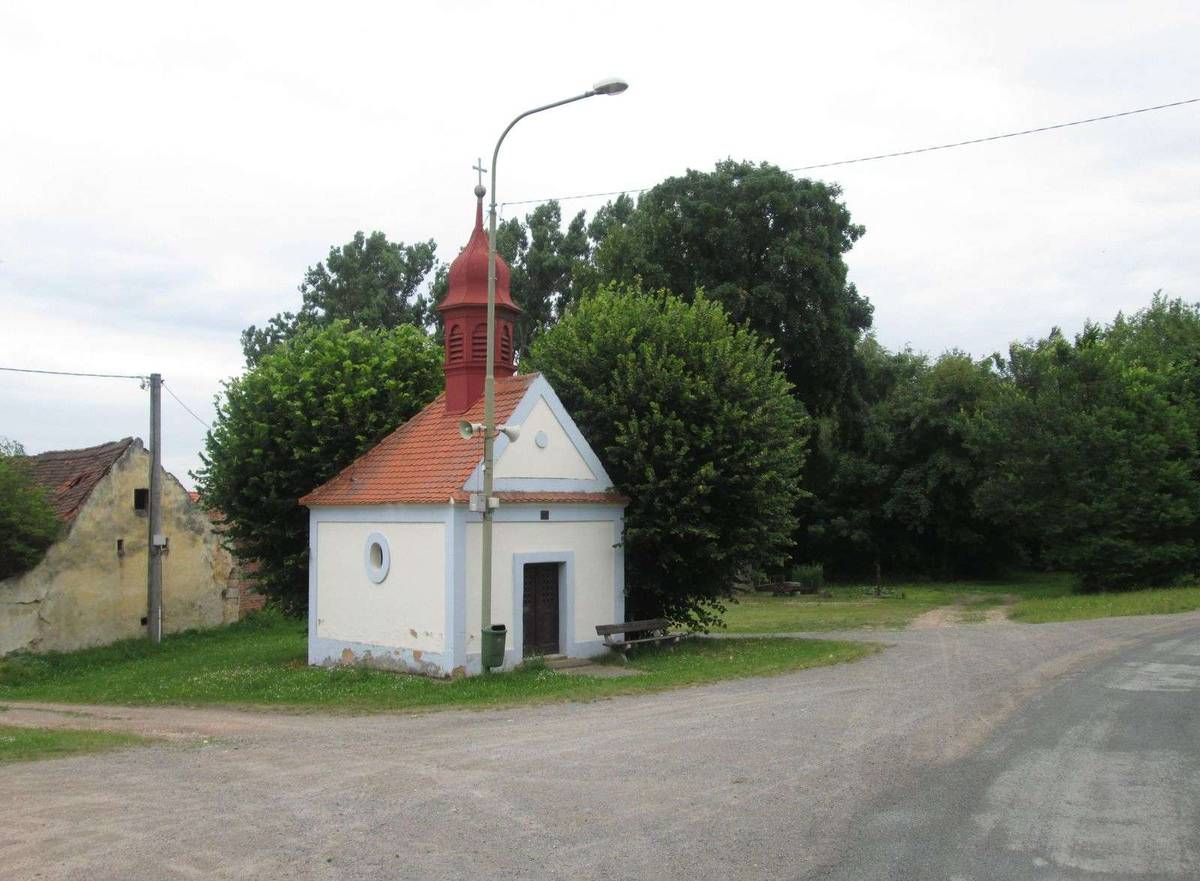
Chapel in Červený Újezd

There are two protected cultural monuments in the municipality: a chapel in Zbůch and a chapel in Červený Újezd. Both date from the first half of the 19th century.

== Notable people ==
- František Hertl (1906–1973), double bassist and composer
