= Serge Lancen =

French composer and pianist (1922–2005)

Serge Jean Mathieu Lancen (5 November 1922 – 10 July 2005) was a French composer and classical pianist.

== Life ==
Born in Paris, already in his earliest childhood Lancen developed an extraordinary interest in music. He completed the Conservatoire de Paris in piano with Marguerite Long and Lazare Lévy, harmony, counterpoint and musical composition with Tony Aubin and Noël Gallon. His exams were awarded a first prize. In 1950 he received the 2nd Prix de Rome for his cantata Bettina, the French Radio Composition Prize and other prizes and awards.

His oeuvre includes numerous compositions ranging from symphonic music to chamber music, concertos for piano, flute, double bass and harp, as well as two ballets and a chamber opera. Since 1960 he has devoted himself particularly to the creation of works for symphonic wind orchestra. His friend Désiré Dondeyne introduced him to this medium.

Lancen died in Paris on 10 July 2005.

== Works ==
=== Pieces for Orchestra ===
- 1964 Charlot
- 1965 Triptyque
- 1968 En route pour Monte-Carlo
- 1968 Fifres en fête
- 1969 Symphonietta
- 1993 Jeunes archets
- 1993 Jeux pour musiciens (for wind ensemble)

=== Masses and religious works ===
- 1957 Narcisse profane oratorio
- 1975 Poème œcuménique for nine soloists, mixed choir, children's choir, organ and symphony orchestra
- 1986 Missa solemnis dedicated to John Paul II for soprano, baritone, mixed choir, harp and symphonic wind orchestra
  1. Introit
  2. Kyrie
  3. Gloria
  4. Offertorium
  5. Sanctus
  6. Pater Noster
  7. Agnus Dei
  8. Communio
  9. Deo Gratias
  10. Alleluia
- 1991 Te Deum for tenor solo, baritone solo, male choir and winds
  1. Te Deum Laudamus
  2. Tu Rex Gloriae, Christe
  3. Salvum fac populum tuum
  4. Miserere nostri, Domine
  5. Laudamus

=== Works for wind orchestra ===
- 1962 Manhattan Symphonie
  1. Arrivée à Manhattan
  2. Le Central Park
  3. Harlem
  4. Broadway
  5. Rockefeller Building
- 1964 Symphonie de Noël
  1. Impressions of the first hours of the solemn Holy Night
  2. Joy and hope
  3. Finale
- 1967 Mini Symphonie
- 1968 Festival à Kerkrade
- 1969 Obsession
- 1969–1970 Cap Kennedy
- 1971 Hymne a la musique
- 1971 Parade Concerto for piano and symphonic wind orchestra
  1. Introduction et Allegro
  2. Andantino
  3. Allegro
- 1971 Ouverture texane
- 1975 Marche pour un anniversaire
- 1975 Symphonie de Paris
- 1976 Ouverture triomphale
- 1976 Rapsodie sui temi bretoni
- 1976 Rhapsodie sur des thèmes Normands
- 1977 Suite pastorale
- 1979 Le Mont Saint Michel Tableaux Symphoniques - musical fresque in four movements
  1. Moderato / Allegro / Moderato - Near le Mont-Saint-Michel rising out of the fog and sand. Crossing the ramps that surround the heart of this small site. Climbing up to the abbey church. Discovering the incomparable panorama without horizon.
  2. Allegro Moderato - A patch of green, peaceful and unexpected.
  3. Maestoso - The proud fortress, its steep buttresses, its austere and echoing vaults.
  4. Moderato / Grandioso - The highest plan of the abbey, with its church, its monastery and the refectory of the monks. The shadow of the Mont-Saint-Michel stretches over the sand into the setting sun. As the night falls, "the miracle" rises from the darkness in the flames of the projectors. Like an arrow, the cathedral and statue of St. Michael rise high above the floods.
- 1980 Trianon for Band
  1. Moderato maestoso
  2. Allegro
  3. Allegro
  4. Moderato maestoso
- 1980 Festival rhapsodie
- 1980 Bocage
- 1980 Versailles
- 1980 Le Chant de l’Arbre
- 1980 Hymne de Fraternité for choir and wind orchestra from the Poème œcuménique
- 1981 Dédicace for alto saxophone and wind orchestra
- 1983 Scandinave
- 1984 Divertimento
- 1984 Marche nuptiale
- 1984 Concerto de Paris for piano and symphonic wind orchestra
- 1986 Mascarade for brass quintet and brass orchestra
  1. Ouverture
  2. Columbine
  3. Pierrot
  4. Harlequin
  5. Mezzetin
  6. Spavento
  7. Le Vagabond
  8. Final
- 1988 Concerto pour Trombone
- 1986 Symphonie de l’Eau Water circuit in nature
- 1986 Aunis et Saintonge en fête
- 1988 Sonate Concertante for clarinet and wind orchestra
- 1990 Concerto pour harpe
- 1990 Divertimento pour petite orchestre d'harmonie
- 1990 Eveil
- 1990 Hymne au soleil
- 1990–1991 Concerto pour cœur
- 1991 Symphonie Ibérique
  1. Andante moderato - Allegro Viva
  2. Lento - Andante
  3. Andante - Allegro - Vivace
- 1991 Concerto pour Hautbois
  1. Allegro
  2. Andante
  3. Allegro
- 1993 Images d’Ollioules
  1. Allegro
  2. Andante
  3. Andante
  4. Allegro Vivo
- 1993 Cinquantième
- 1993 Symphonie joyeuse
- 1993 Zwiefache Symphonique
  1. Allegro
  2. Allegretto
  3. Moderato
  4. Allegro
- 1994 Remerciements for baritone, harp and harmony orchestra based on texts from the Bible and from prayers
  1. Introduction
  2. Prière
  3. Remerciements à Dieu
  4. Benidicamus Domine
  5. Prière du Souvenir
  6. Gloire à Dieu - Alleluia
- 1994 Credo for mixed four-part choir and harmony orchestra
- 1995 Hymne aux musiciens
- 1996 Espaces harmoniques for reciter, choirs and harmony orchestra
- 1996 Jubilé
- 1998 Jour de fête
- Contraste for alto saxophone and wind orchestra
- Ouverture pour un Matin d’Automne
- Copacabana

=== Stage works ===
- 1962 Mauvaise conscience, chamber opera

=== Concerts with accompaniment (orchestra, piano and other instruments) ===
- 1954 Concerto pour harmonica
- 1962 Concerto pour flûte et orchestre
- 1962 Concerto pour contrebasse
- 1966 Concerto pour violon
- 1968 Concerto champêtre pour harpe et orchestre
- 1974 Concerto Rhapsodie pour piano et orchestre
- 1978 Mouvement pour cornet ou trompette et piano
- 1985 Concerto pour violon et contrebasse
- 1987 Concerto pour contrebasse et orchestre
- 1988 Concerto pour harpe (also in a version for wind players)
- 1992 Concerto pour saxophone alto et orchestre

== Bibliography ==
- Jozef Robijns, Miep Zijlstra: Algemene muziekencyclopedie, Haarlem: De Haan, (1979)-1984, ISBN 978-90-228-4930-9
- Wolfgang Suppan, Armin Suppan: Das Neue Lexikon des Blasmusikwesens, 4th edition, Freiburg-Tiengen, Blasmusikverlag Schulz GmbH, 1994, ISBN 3-923058-07-1
- Paul E. Bierley, William H. Rehrig: The heritage encyclopedia of band music : composers and their music, Westerville, Ohio: Integrity Press, 1991, ISBN 0-918048-08-7
- Jean-Marie Londeix: Musique pour saxophone, volume II : répertoire général des œuvres et des ouvrages d' enseignement pour le saxophone, Cherry Hill: Roncorp Publications, 1985.
- Jean-Marie Londeix: 125 ans de musique pour saxophone, répertoire général des œuvres et des ouvrages d' enseignement pour le saxophone, Paris: Éditions Musicales, 1971.
- Nicole Lacombe, Alain Lacombe: Des compositeurs pour l'image (Cinéma et Teélévision), Neuilly sur Seine: Musique et promotion éditeur, 1982, 602 pages.
