= František Hertl =

Czech double bassist and composer (1906–1973)

František Hertl (18 April 1906, Zbůch – 23 February 1973, Prague) was a Czech double bassist, composer and conductor.

== Life ==
Hertl was the oldest of five children born in to a Kapellmeister. As a child he was taught by his father; he played violin and several other instruments. In 1920 he took the entrance exam for violin study at the Prague Conservatory; on the recommendation of František Černý he switched to double bass, and studied with Černý at the Conservatory from then on.

After concluding his studies in 1926, Hertl was engaged as principal bassist at the National Theatre in Ljubljana. At the same time, he took a teaching position at a music school in the city. After a short stint in the military, he became the principal bassist of the Czech Philharmonic, then directed by Václav Talich, with whom Hertl studied conducting. He also studied composition from 1933 to 1936 with Otakar Šín and Jaroslav Řídký at the Prague Conservatory.

In 1935, he left the Czech Philharmonic and took a position with the Radio Symphony Orchestra of Prague (Symfonický orchestr Českého rozhlasu). He served as principal double bassist there until 1950. From 1936 to 1950 he was also the artistic director and double bassist for the chamber ensemble Czech Nonet. In 1950–1951 he co-founded the Prague Chamber Orchestra (Pražský komorní orchestr) and served as its artistic director until 1955.

After 1950 Hertl was no longer active as an orchestral musician, but dedicated his efforts instead to conducting. From 1950 to 1961 he conducted for Czechoslovak Radio; he led the Brno Radio Orchestra (Brněnský estrádní rozhlasový orchestr) from 1952 to 1958.

In 1951 he was appointed professor of double bass and chamber music at the Prague Conservatory, and later taught conducting there as well. He also taught at the Janáček Academy of Music and Performing Arts in Brno from 1954 to 1961. From 1953 until his death, he taught double bass and chamber music at the Academy of Musical Arts in Prague, receiving the title of Professor in 1969. As a pedagogue he was especially renowned for raising the technical standard of double bass playing, creating a Method for Double Bass and 20 Etudes for Double Bass that are widely used by double bass instructors.

== Selected works ==
=== Symphonic ===
- Czech Suite (1940)
- Dramatic Overture (1945)
- Czech Overture (1947)
- Czech Dances (1947)
- Symphonic Scherzo (1950)

=== Concertos ===
- Tarantella for flute and orchestra (1950)
- Symfonieta for oboe and small orchestra (1956)
- Concerto for double bass and small orchestra (1957)
- Concertino for trumpet and string orchestra (1967)

=== Chamber music ===
- Sonata for Flute and Piano (1948)
- Sonata for Double Bass and Piano (1946)
- Sonata for Cello and Piano (1958, lost)
- Four Pieces for Double Bass and Piano (1967)
- 30 Miniatures for Double Bass and Piano (1971)
