= Andrzej Cwojdziński =

Polish composer, conductor, and music teacher (1928–2022)

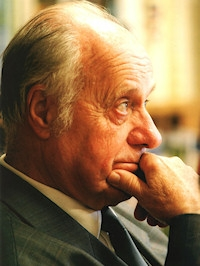
- Born: 28 January 1928; Jaworzno, Poland
- Died: 23 March 2022 (aged 94)
- Education: John Paul II Catholic University of Lublin
- Occupations: Composer, conductor, music teacher

Andrzej Cwojdziński (28 January 1928 – 23 March 2022) was a Polish composer, conductor and music teacher.

== Biography ==
Cwojdziński was born in Jaworzno. He attended the Academy of Music in Kraków, where he studied composing and conducting. He also attended John Paul II Catholic University of Lublin from 1960 to 1962. Cwojdziński served as the director for the Koszalin Philharmonic from 1964 to 1979. He also served as the director for the Polish Piano Festival in Słupsk from 1967 to 1999. He served as a member of the Polish Composers' Union.

Cwojdziński taught at the Academy of Music in Gdańsk from 1991 to 1999. He also taught at the Pomeranian Academy in Słupsk. Cwojdziński was honored with medals, such as, Order of Polonia Restituta, Cross of Merit, Medal of the 40th Anniversary of People's Poland, Pro Ecclesia et Pontifice and Medal for Merit to Culture – Gloria Artis. He served as a member of the West Pomeranian Social Committee. In 2020, Cwojdziński was made an honorary citizen of Koszalin.

Cwojdziński died in March 2022, at the age of 94.
