= Inna Zhvanetskaya =

Ukrainian composer

- Zhvanetskaya about the age of 60

Background information
- Born: Inna Abramovna Zhvanetskaya; January 20, 1937; Vinnytsia, Ukrainian SSR, Soviet Union
- Died: December 18, 2024 (aged 87)
- Occupation: Composer

Inna Abramovna Zhvanetskaya (20 January 1937 – 18 December 2024) was a Soviet composer and musical educator. Born in the Ukrainian SSR, she spent most of her career in Moscow before moving to Germany after the fall of the Soviet Union. She has lived in Stuttgart since 1998.

== Early life ==
Inna Zhvanetskaya was born in Vinnytsia, Ukrainian SSR, in 1937. Her family was of Jewish origin and was forced to flee their hometown after the Nazi invasion of the Soviet Union. She has been described as a holocaust survivor in various media outlets.

== Musical career ==
Moving to Moscow, she taught piano at music schools in Podolsk, on the outskirts of the Soviet capital, and studied composition under Nikolay Peyko at the Gnessin Musical-Pedagogical Institute, graduating in 1964. In 1964–1965 she taught piano at a vocational school. In 1965, she became a lecturer in score-reading and instrumentation at her alma mater. She was released from her position at Gnessin in 1986.

== Later life ==
After the fall of the Soviet Union Zhvanetskaia moved to Germany, and since 1998 she has lived in Stuttgart. During the coronavirus pandemic, Zhvanetskaya was alleged to have been pressured by German authorities into getting vaccinated. Her case became a cause célèbre in right-wing, anti-vaxxer and Querdenker circles. She was claimed to have gone into hiding with anti-vaccine activists, and was reported by one such group to have passed away in late 2024.

== Work ==
Zhvanetskaya's compositions include:

=== Chamber ===
- Burlesque (violin and piano; 1959)
- Five Dance Pieces for Children (two cellos; 2007)
- La Bale (viola and piano; 2015)
- Memories of the Composer Alfred Schnittke (solo cello)
- Six Pieces (wind quintet; 1969)
- Violin Sonata (1976)
- Splinters of Childhood (solo violin)
- String Quartet (1962)
- Variations on a Jewish Theme (two violins)

=== Orchestral ===
- Double Bass Concerto (with piano reduction; 1978)
- Overture (1963)
- Piano Concerto
- Suite (string orchestra; 1965)

=== Piano ===
- Partita (1966)
- Polyphonic Fantasy (1962)
- Toccata (1961)
- Variations on a Theme of Brahms (1958)
- Memories of Russia [6]
- Piano concerto [6]

=== Vocal ===
- Cycle (words by A. Izaakian; voice and piano; 1960)
- From Medieval Hebrew Poetry (1998)
- Loud Songs of Anna Akhmatova
- Romances (words by V. Bryusov and other unspecified poets)
- Yanvarski Stroki (words by S. Smirnov; voice and piano; 1968)
- Zemiyai! (words by Tvorenye-Cholovek; chorus and orchestra; 1972)
