= Rolf Martinsson =

Swedish composer (born 1956)

Rolf Martinsson (born 1 May 1956 in Glimåkra, Skåne, Sweden) is a Swedish composer. Martinsson studied composition at Malmö Academy of Music, Lund University 1981-85 under Brian Ferneyhough, Sven-David Sandström, Hans Eklund, Sven-Eric Johanson, Jan W. Morthenson and Sven-Erik Bäck. Since 1987 he has taught composition and arranging at the same academy.

In 1980, he was one of the founders of FUTIM (Föreningen unga tonsättare i Malmö), Association of young composers in Malmö. In 1984 he was the producer for UNM (Ung nordisk musik), Young Scandinavian music, in Malmö and in 1986 was elected into the Association of Swedish composers. Since 2002 he has been artistic director (for new music) of the Malmö Symphony Orchestra. Rolf Martinsson has written pieces in many different genres such as orchestral music, solo concertos, choral music, chamber music and music for radio theatre. Several pieces have been commissioned by Swedish and overseas ensembles.
