= Václav Pichl =

Czech classical composer (1741-1805)

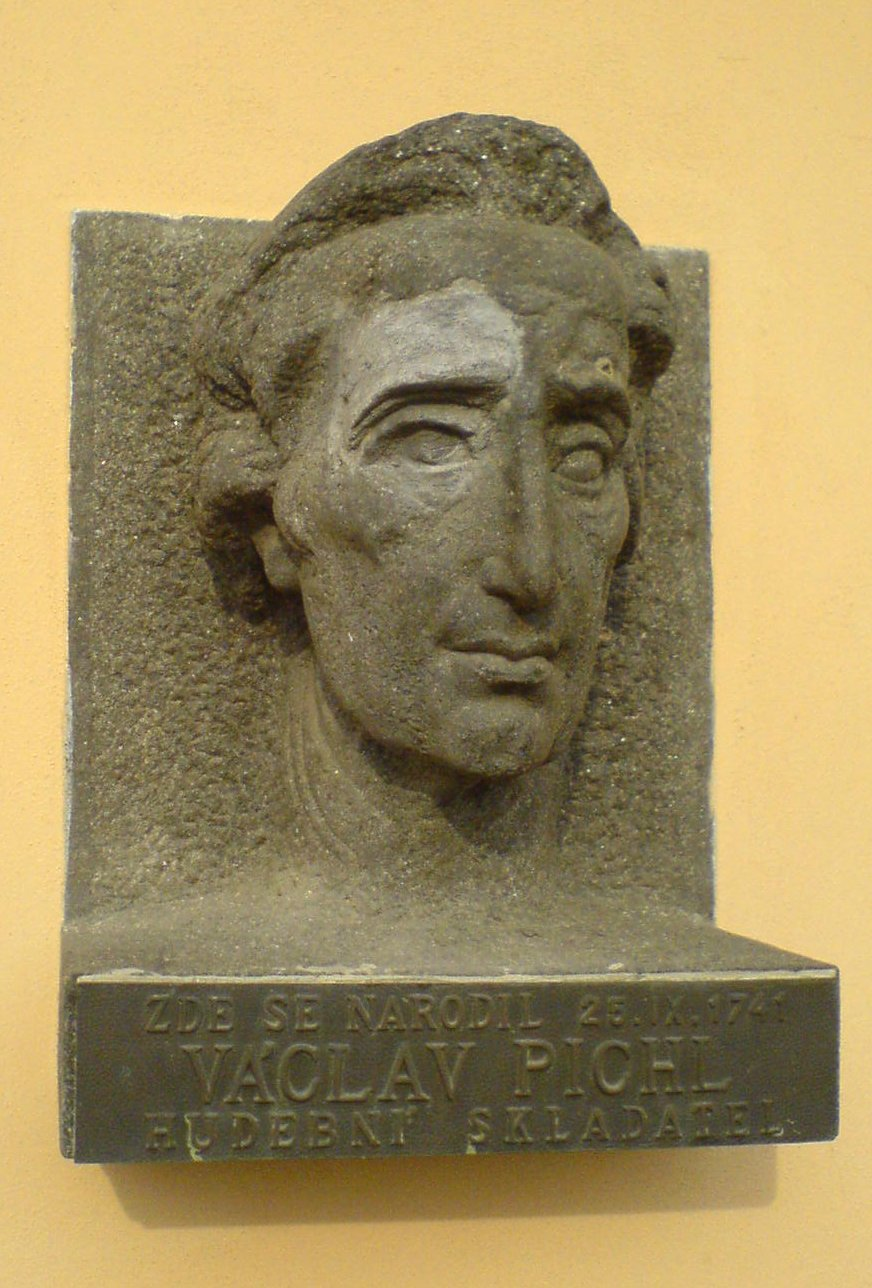
Bust of Pichl on his birth house

Václav Pichl (German: Wenzel Pichl; 25 September 1741 – 23 January 1805) was a Czech classical composer. He was also a violinist, music director and writer.

== Life ==
Pichl was born in Bechyně in Bohemia. His first musical training was at Bechyně with the cantor Jan Pokorný. He served as a singer between the years 1752 and 1758 at the Jesuit college at Březnice. In Prague, he was a violinist at the Jesuit seminary of Saint Wenceslaus and his studies while at the university were philosophy, theology and law.

He was appointed to the post of first violinist of the Týn Church in 1762 and studied counterpoint with the organist J. N. Seger. In 1765 he was engaged by the composer Carl Ditters von Dittersdorf as a violinist for the private orchestra of Bishop Adam Patachich at Nagyvárad (now Oradea, Romania). The orchestra was dissolved in 1769 and Pichl became the music director for Count Ludwig Hartig in Prague.

In about 1770 he became first violinist of the Vienna court theatre and on the recommendation of the Empress Maria Theresa, he became music director for the Austrian governor of Lombardy at Milan, Ferdinand Karl, Archduke of Austria-Este. Pichl went to the Kingdom of Italy in 1777 and remained there until 1796 when the French invaded Lombardy, he then returned to Vienna, where he stayed in the service of the archduke until his death (apart from a brief visit to Prague in 1802). In 1785, he met Mozart and became friends with him. While Pichl was active in Milan, he served as Nikolaus I, Prince Esterházy's musical trustee in Milan, as well having composed over 148 pieces for the prince's favorite instrument, the baryton. Through this connection with the Prince, he was also able to get in touch with Haydn who would also be a friend. He was known to be a fan of Pichl's compositions, even having a set of Pichl's "new quartets" copied by hand to be played at Eszterháza in 1780. A detailed list of works that Pichl prepared for Dlabac's Künstler-Lexikon (1802) runs to around 900 items, most of which are still extant. Václav Pichl died in Vienna, Austrian Empire, on 23 January 1805, as the result of a stroke while playing a violin concerto at the Palais Lobkowitz. He was 63 years old.

== Selected works ==
- Six symphonies, op. 1 (two oboes, two clarinets, two horns, drums, strings. c. 1778. "SEI SINFONIE A PIÙ STROMENTI. Dedicate A SUA ALTEZZA REALE IL SERENISSIMO ARCIDUCA FERDINANTO Principe Reale d'Ungeria e Boemia ... Da WENCESLAO PICHL. in attuale Servizio dell'Istessa Altezza Reale. OPERA PRIMA")
- Six String Quartets, op. 2 (in A, C, F, Em, D, and B♭. ca. 1779.)
- Three Violin Concertos, op. 3 (in D, G and B♭. 1779.)
- Six trios concertans, op. 7 (in C, F, B♭, E♭, A and D. 1783.) The front page of this work (IMSLP) states that he was a pupil of M. Haydn
- Three Symphonies, op. 8 (in C, E♭ and D. 1784.)
- Six Duos for Violin and Viola, op. 10 (in C, G, D, B♭, F, E♭. 1784.)
- Three quartets for flute, violin, viola, and violoncello, op. 12 (1787)
- Three String Quartets, op. 13 (in A, B♭ and E♭. 1788.)
- Three Duets for viola and cello, op. 14 (in C, G and A. ca. 1788.)
- Three Symphonies, op. 15 (in D, B♭ and ca. 1790.)
- Three Duos for violin and cello, op. 16 (Amadeus Edition edited by Bernhard Pauler, published in 2002)
- Twelve Caprices for solo violin, op. 19 (1796)
- Three Sonatas for Solo Violin with Accompaniment of Violin or Viola, op. 23
- Symphonies for Orchestra op. 24
- Sei fughe con un preludio fugato: per un violino solo (may be op. 41)
- Etude for the Violin in the Form of Twelve Caprices, op. 46 (about 1801)
- Koncert for String Bass and Orchestra in C major
