= Édouard Nanny =

French double bass player, teacher, and composer (1872–1942)

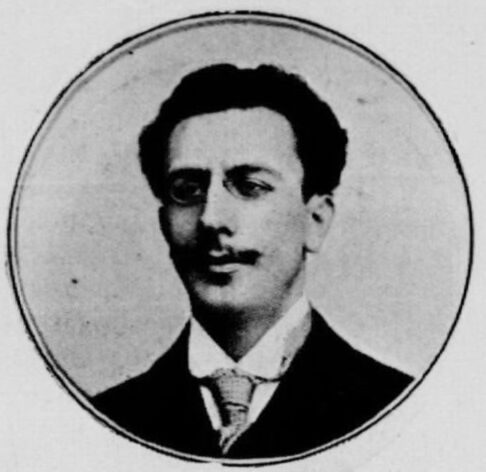
Image of Édouard Nanny

Édouard Nanny (March 24, 1872 in Saint-Germain-en-Laye – October 12, 1942 in Paris) was an important French double bass player, teacher, and composer. He was a longtime professor of double bass at the Paris Conservatory.

== Career ==
Nanny was part of la Société de concerts des Instruments anciens. He gained some international exposure as a composer during his lifetime, although he never enjoyed the respect he received in France worldwide. Among his most famous works are his Concerto in E minor and his Enseignement Complet (a collection of pedagogical works including the 2-part Méthode complète pour la contrebasse à quatre et cinq cordes, the Vingt études de virtuosité (Paris, 1920), and his Dix étude-caprices).

Although his two concertos (his own and the musical hoax under Dragonetti's name) are important repertory items, Nanny's most lasting contribution was in the field of pedagogy (instructional method). Edouard Nanny taught at the Paris Conservatory until 1940. In his principle work, Enseignement Complet considered his most lasting accomplishment, Nanny passed to others the method he used to become a virtuoso during his lifetime. This is his from-basic-to-virtuoso, ‘A-to-Z’ repertoire of studies for the double bassist, originally for bowing but also for pizzicato (plucked). Quite naturally it can be applied to the bass guitar and cello – same clef and similar range as the double bass. For the cello, although the notes are read identically they will however, sound an octave higher. This does not detract from this method advancing the artistry of cellists as well as bassists.

The initial exercises use scale phrases in the keys of C Major, G Major, and D Major. The studies include jumps and scale phrases, progressing to different rhythms, keys, and tempos. A beginner or intermediate bassist may complete the book in two to five years, while an advanced player may complete it in one to three years. The method covers fifty-two pages.

Nanny's Concerto in A major that was attributed to classical Italian virtuoso Domenico Dragonetti was, in fact, penned by Nanny.

Nanny's study method, "Enseignement Complet" his études and caprices have been studied and played for close to a century by double bassists, performers, teachers and students alike.
