= Johannes Matthias Sperger =

Austrian double bass player and composer (1750–1812)

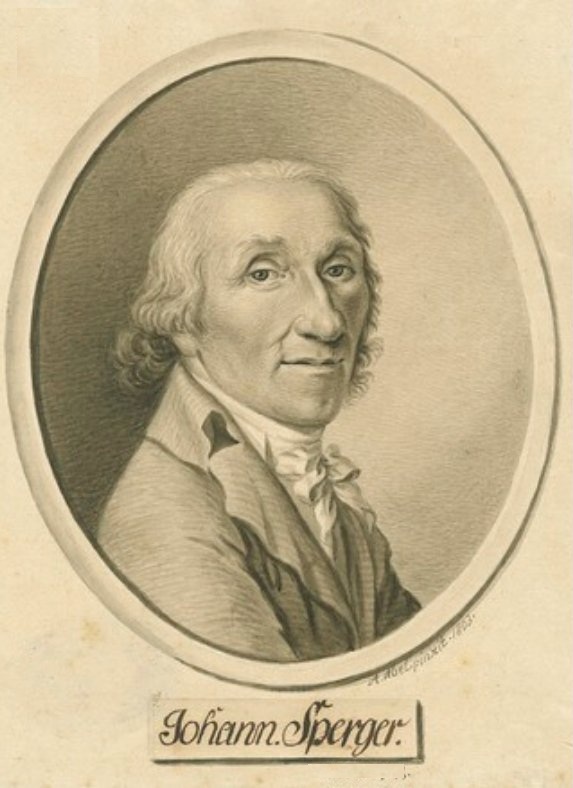
- Leopold August Abel 1803
- Born: 23 March 1750; Feldsberg, Lower Austria, Holy Roman Empire
- Died: 13 May 1812 (aged 62); Ludwigslust, Germany
- Occupations: Double bassist, composer

Johannes Matthias Sperger, also often Johann, (Czech: Jan Matyáš Sperger; 23 March 1750 – 13 May 1812) was an Austrian double bassist and composer.

Sperger was born in Feldsberg, Lower Austria, now Valtice, Czech Republic, and trained from 1767 in Vienna as a contrabassist and composer. He worked from 1777 in the Hofkapelle of the Archbishop of Pressburg. From 1778 he was also a member in the Wiener Tonkünstler-Sozietät, participating in its concerts several times playing his own works and as soloist. From 1783 to 1786, Sperger was a member of the Hofkapelle of count Ludwig von Erdődy in Kohfidisch. From 1789 he was employed as first contrabassist of the Mecklenburg Schwerin Hofkapelle in Ludwigslust. He was a prolific composer, writing at least forty-four symphonies, numerous instrumental concertos, including eighteen for contrabass. He also wrote sonatas, rondos and dances, cantatas, choral works, and airs. He died in Ludwigslust in 1812 aged 62.

Double bassist and musicologist Darija Andelic-Andzakovic announced in 2025 that her examination of the manuscript of one of the concerts attributed to Sperger, the Double Bass Concerto in E-flat major, was in fact by Ignaz Pleyel. It may have been performed in Pressburg when it was composed, but has not been played since. Its modern premiere was played by double bassist Robert Nairn and the Australian Brandenburg Orchestra in 2026.
