= Johann Baptist Wanhal =

Czech composer (1739–1813)

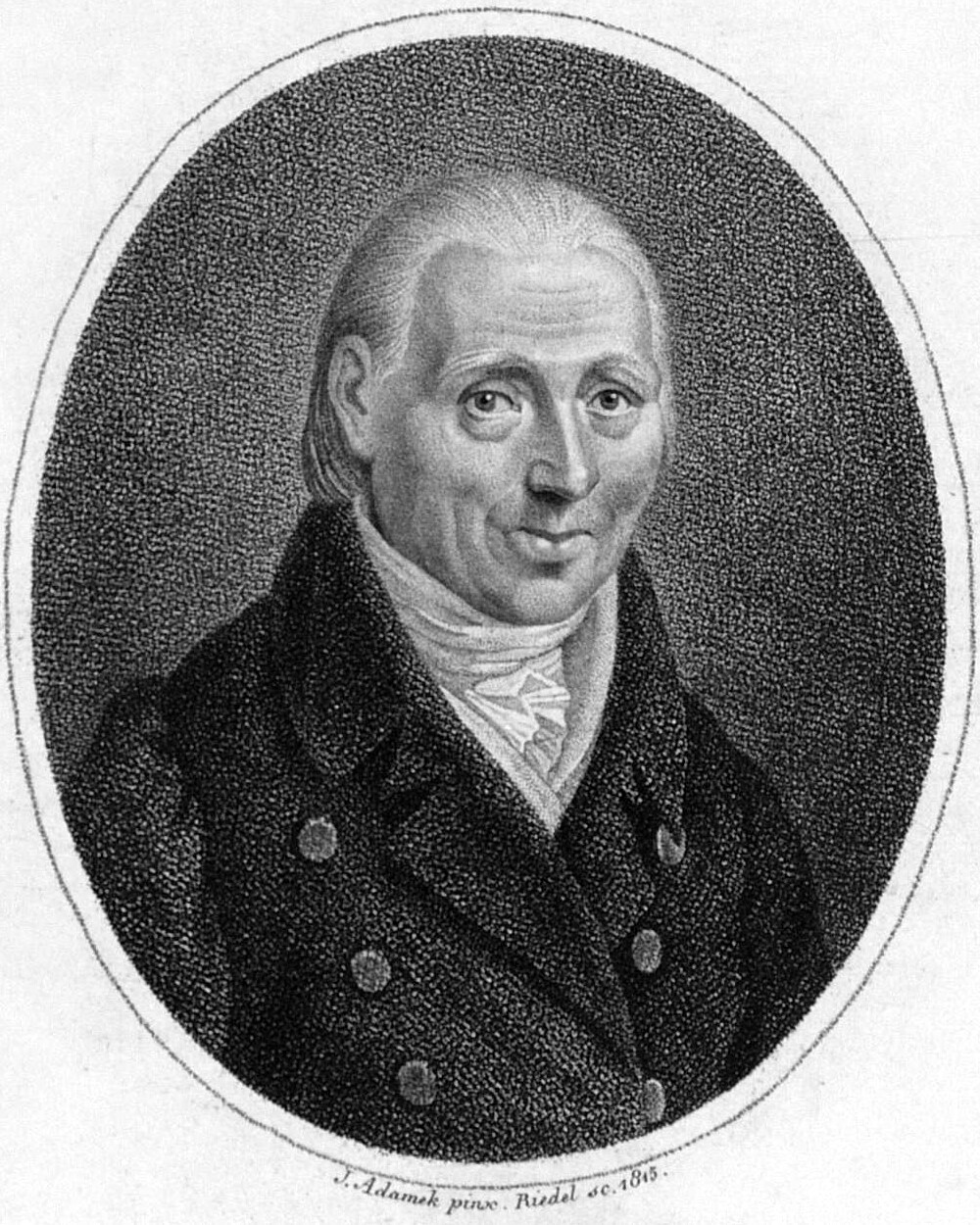
Johann Baptist Wanhal

Johann Baptist Wanhal (12 May 1739 – 20 August 1813) was a Czech composer of the Classical period. He was born in Nechanice, Bohemia, and died in Vienna. His music was well respected by Wolfgang Amadeus Mozart, Joseph Haydn, Ludwig van Beethoven and Franz Schubert. He was an accomplished instrumentalist as well; a proficient organist, he also played the violin and cello.

== Name ==
Wanhal and at least one of his publishers used the spelling Waṅhal, the dot being an archaic form of the modern háček. Other attested variants include Wanhall, Vanhal and Van Hall. The modern Czech form Jan Křtitel Vaňhal was introduced in the 20th century.

== Biography ==
=== Birth and youth in Bohemia: 1739–1760/61 ===
Wanhal was born in Nechanice, Bohemia, into serfdom in a Czech peasant family. He received his first musical training from his family and local musicians, the organist Anton Erban being one of his most prized mentors, and excelled at violin and organ at an early age. From these humble beginnings, he was able to earn a living as a village organist and choirmaster. He was also taught German from an early age, as this was required for someone wishing to make a career in music within the Habsburg empire.

=== First period in Vienna: 1760/61–1769 ===
By the age of 21, Wanhal must have been well under way to become a skilled performer and composer, as his patron, Countess Schaffgotsch, took him to Vienna as part of her personal train in 1760. There, he quickly established himself as a teacher of singing, violin and piano to the high nobility, and he was invited to conduct his symphonies for illustrious patrons such as members of the Erdődy family and Baron Isaac von Riesch of Dresden. During the years 1762–63, he is said to have been the student of Carl Ditters von Dittersdorf, even though they were born the same year. Baron Riesch sponsored a trip to Italy in 1769 so that Wanhal could learn the Italian style of composition, which was very much in fashion. To return the favour, Wanhal supposedly became Riesch's Kapellmeister.

=== Journey to Italy: 1769–1771 ===
The details of Wanhal's journey to Italy are scant, but it is known that he met his fellow Bohemians Gluck and Florian Gassmann in Venice and Rome, respectively. The Italian journey offers the only evidence of Wanhal writing operas. It is thought that he wrote music for the Metastasian opera libretti Il Trionfo di Clelia and Demofonte, either by himself or in collaboration with Gassmann. Wanhal might have supplied some or all of the arias, but nothing can be evaluated, since these works have been lost. In additions to his documented travels in northern and central Italy, Wanhal may have intended to travel to Naples, but never seems to have arrived there.

=== Vienna and Varaždin: 1771–1780 ===
After his journey to Italy, Wanhal returned to Vienna rather than to go to Riesch in Dresden. Claims have been made that Wanhal became heavily depressed or even insane, but these claims are likely to have been overstated. During this period it is supposed that he acted occasionally as a de facto Kapellmeister for Count Erdődy in Varaždin, Croatia, although the small number of compositions by him remaining there suggests that this was not the full-time role that would have been expected if he had worked with Riesch; Vanhal might have preferred such employment with the Count precisely because of its part-time nature. There is no evidence of visits after 1779.

=== Return to Vienna and final years: 1780–1813 ===
Around 1780, Wanhal stopped writing symphonies and string quartets, focusing instead on sacred works and music for piano and small-scale chamber ensembles. His piano music, written for a growing middle class, supplied him with the means to live a modest, economically independent life. For the last 30 years of his life, he did not work under any patron, probably being the first prominent Viennese composer to do so. During these years, more than 270 of his works were published by Viennese printers. In the 1780s, he was still an active participant in Viennese musical life. In 1782, he met Mozart, who admired Wanhal's symphonies. He enjoyed playing music with Mozart and some of his friends who were composers, as testified in Michael Kelly's account of the string quartet Wanhal played in together with Haydn, Mozart and Dittersdorf in 1784. After 1787 or so, however, he seems to have ceased performing in public, but he nevertheless was economically secure, living in good quarters near St. Stephen's Cathedral. He died without heirs in 1813, an elderly composer whose music was still recognized by the Viennese public.

== Style ==
Johann Baptist Wanhal: Simphonie Periodique, N. 22: Highlights from the 3 movements: Allegro-Andante (Piano)-Presto.
Porticodoro / SmartCGArt Media Productions – Classical Orchestra.

Wanhal had to be a prolific writer to meet the demands made upon him, and attributed to him are 100 quartets, at least 73 symphonies, 95 sacred works, and a large number of instrumental and vocal works. The symphonies, in particular, have been committed increasingly often to compact disc in recent times, and the best of them are comparable with many of Haydn's. Many of Wanhal's symphonies are in minor keys and are considered highly influential to the "Sturm und Drang" movement of his time. "[Wanhal] makes use of repeated semiquavers, pounding quavers in the bass line, wide skips in the themes, sudden pauses (fermatas), silences, exaggerated dynamic marks ... and all these features ... appear in Mozart's first large-scale Sturm und Drang symphony, no. 25 in g minor (K. 183) of 1773." This kind of style also appears in Joseph Haydn's Symphony No. 83 in g minor, The Hen (1785), and Muzio Clementi's Sonata in g minor, Op.34, No.2 (circa 1795).

Johann Baptist Wanhal: Sonata for Flute and Bass, Op. 10 N. 1: Highlights from the 4 movements: Allegro-Adagio-Presto-Minuetto and Variations.
Porticodoro / SmartCGArt Media Productions – Flute and Bassoon.

Around 1780 Wanhal seems to have stopped writing large-scale instrumental music, and rather contented himself with writing piano music for the growing middle class, and church music. In the former category his programmatic pieces, often related to recent events such as "the Battle of Würzburg", "the Battle of Abukir", and "the Return of Francis II in 1809". Judging from the number of extant manuscripts available, these works must have been highly popular. Wanhal was also the most prolific writer of Masses and other Catholic church music of his generation in Vienna. Despite this, it appears that he was never in the employ of any religious institution. This means that his late Masses are both testaments to a genuine personal faith, and evidence of how lucrative his focus on incidental piano music must have been.

Robert O. Gjerdingen sees a change in Wanhal's style as he redirected his attention towards the middle class, his music becoming didactic in the sense that it employed musical figures in a clear and self-referential manner, rather than the seamless continuity from figure to figure that had characterized his earlier pieces. In this, Gjerdingen sees Wanhal as prefiguring Beethoven.

Such was his success that within a few years of his symphonies being written, they were being performed around the world, and as far distant as the United States. In later life, however, he rarely moved from Vienna, where he was also an active teacher.
