= Kronberg Academy =

Music school in Kronberg im Taunus, Germany

Coordinates: 50°10′51″N 08°30′54″E

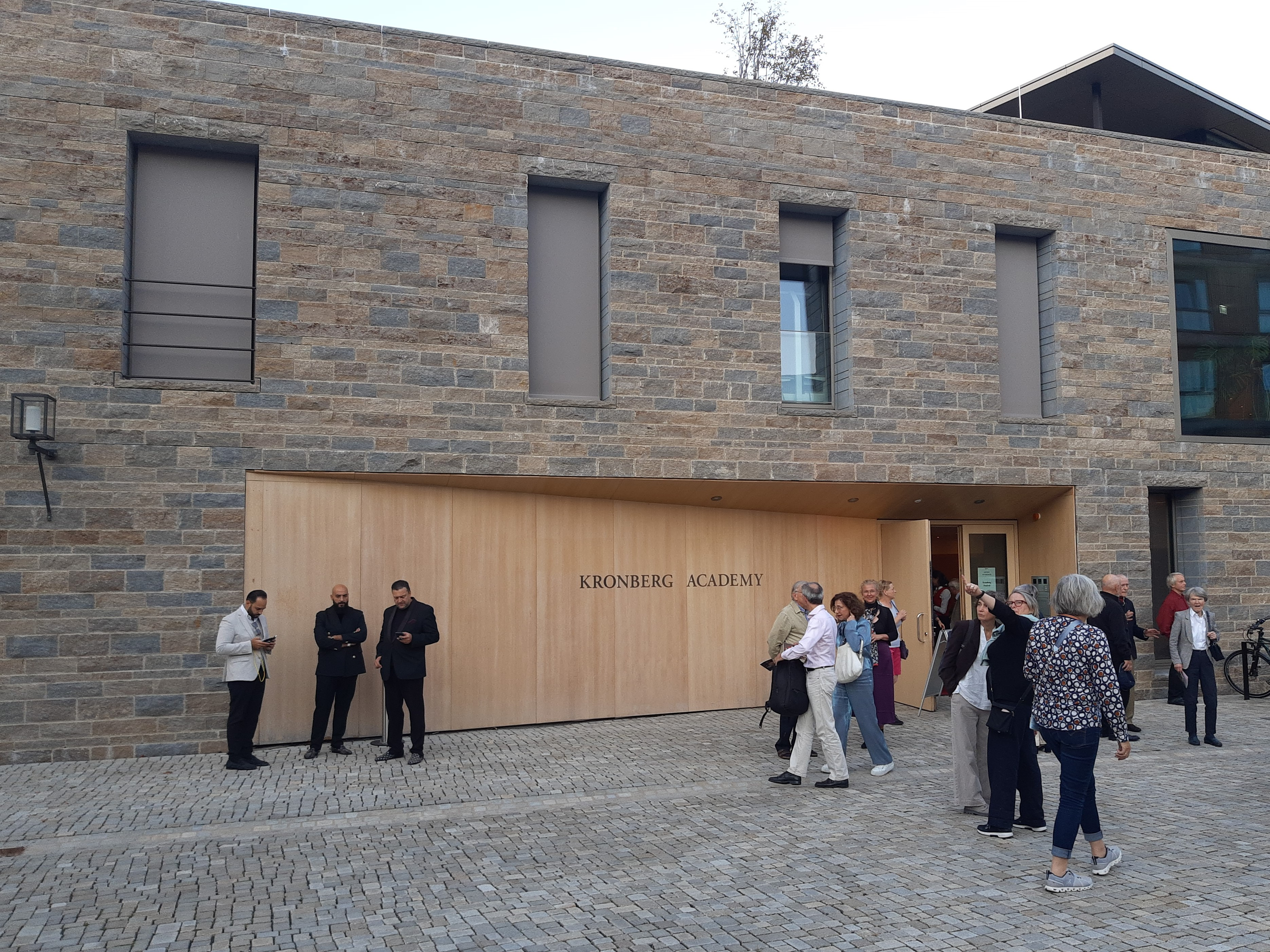
- Type: Private
- Established: 1993; 33 years ago
- Chairman: Raimund Trenkler
- Director: Friedemann Eichhorn
- Students: 39
- Location: Kronberg im Taunus, Hesse, Germany
- Website: kronbergacademy.de

Kronberg Academy is a private music school for string instrumentalists based in Kronberg im Taunus, Germany. Founded in 1993 by Raimund Trenkler, the Academy trains a select group of young musicians who have the potential to build international careers as soloists and chamber musicians.

Initially, the focus of Kronberg Academy was to train and support young cellists but has since been extended to include violinists, violists and pianists . It also organises a diverse range of projects, competitions, masterclasses and concerts. Kronberg Academy was granted charitable status in 2004.

== Programmes ==
Kronberg Academy offers study programmes that are unique within Europe. These include a Bachelor and Master programme for outstanding young musicians who seek to develop international careers as soloists. The Bachelor and Master courses are offered in collaboration with Frankfurt University of Music and Performing Arts. The school also offers a two-year Professional Studies programme focusing on concert performance.

Since Autumn 2018 the Sir András Schiff Performance Programme for Young Pianists has offered a programme for select young pianists who wish to focus on chamber music.

== Artistic Council ==
Kronberg Academy receives active support from many well-known artists. The members of the Artistic Council are Marta Casals Istomin, Christoph Eschenbach, Gidon Kremer and Sir András Schiff. The cellist Mstislav Rostropovich, member of the Artistic Council until his death in 2007, declared Kronberg to be the “world capital of the cello” as early as 1997, and founded the Rostropovich Cello Foundation in Kronberg in support of young cellists.

Since 2012 the director of Kronberg Academy's study programmes has been Friedemann Eichhorn, who is also Co-Artistic Director with Raimund Trenkler.

== Facilities ==
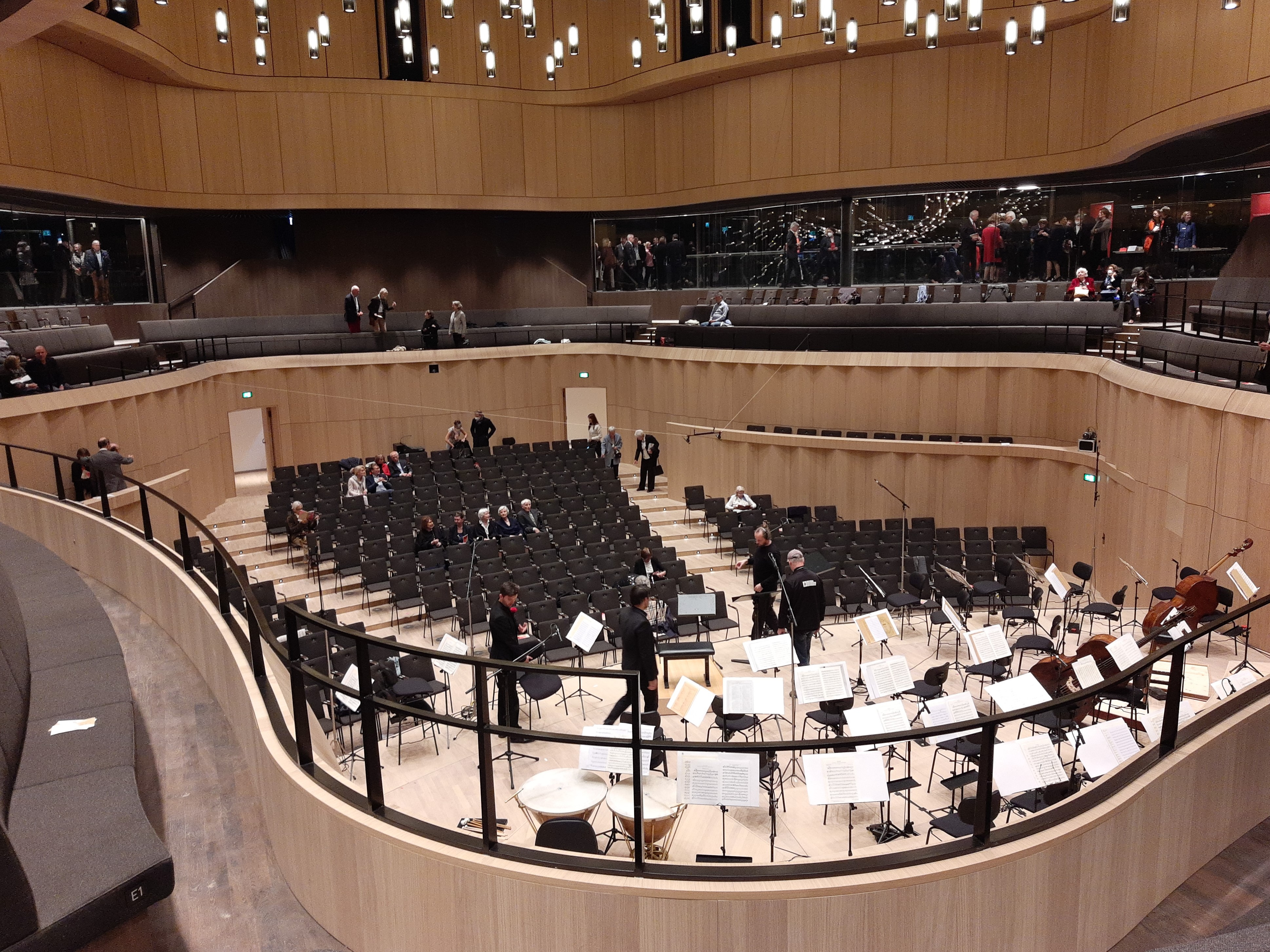
The public opening of Casals Forum in 2022

In September 2022, the Kronberg Academy opened a new concert hall, the Casals Forum. Designed by Volker Staab from Berlin with acoustic supervision by Martijn Vercammen (Netherlands), building started in 2017 and was completed in 2022. It is named in honour of the cellist Pablo Casals, whose values of humanity and human dignity Kronberg Academy has adopted.

The venue houses two concert halls; the main hall with a capacity of 550 persons and the Carl Bechstein Saal, a smaller hall with a capacity of 150 seats. The complex also includes practise and tuition rooms for Academy students, as well as the administrative area of Kronberg Academy.

== Projects ==
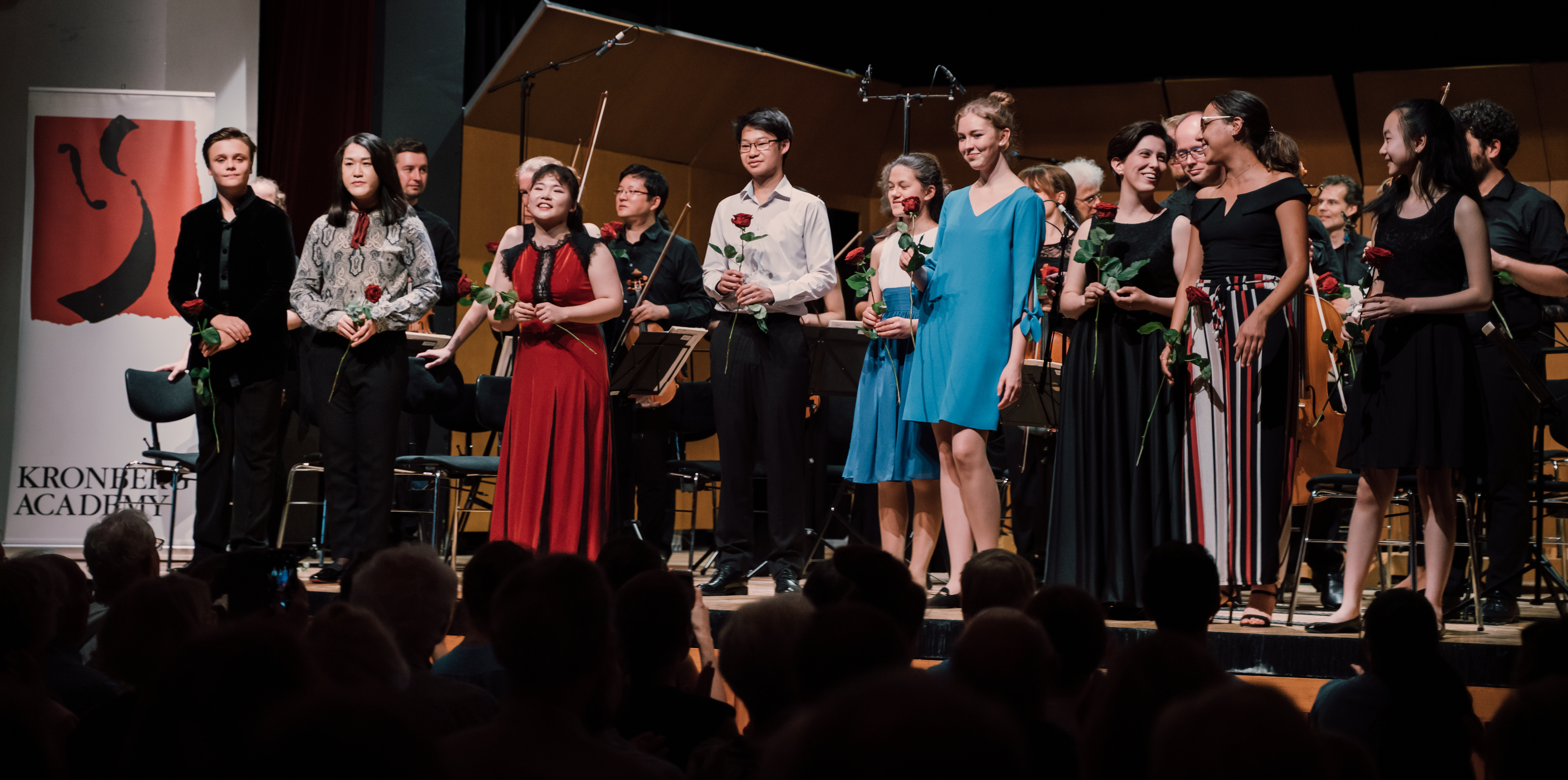
Kronberg Academy’s Violin Masterclasses & Concerts in 2019

Kronberg Academy organises numerous renowned events, all of which designed to inspire, train and shape young musicians. As a result, Kronberg has become a meeting place for artists from around the globe. The main events include:

- Kronberg Festival (every two years since 1993, annual since 2022, formerly called Kronberg Academy Festival)
- Cello Masterclasses & Concerts (every two years since 1994)
- Violin and Viola Masterclasses & Concerts (every two years since 2009)
- Viola-Fest (1989 and 2003)
- Chamber Music Connects the World (every two years since 2000, annually since 2022)
- Kronberg Academy on Tour (2004, 2006 and 2008)
- Projects for children and teenagers: Kids@Casals, Mit Musik – Miteinander and various youth concerts

Kronberg Academy also organises these competitions:

- Grand Prix Emanuel Feuermann, organised in collaboration with the Berlin University of the Arts (every four years since 2002)
- International Pablo Casals Cello Competition (2000 and 2004)
- International Piano Competition for Young Pianists Kronberg also takes place in Kronberg Academy with the laureate concert taking place in Casals Forum

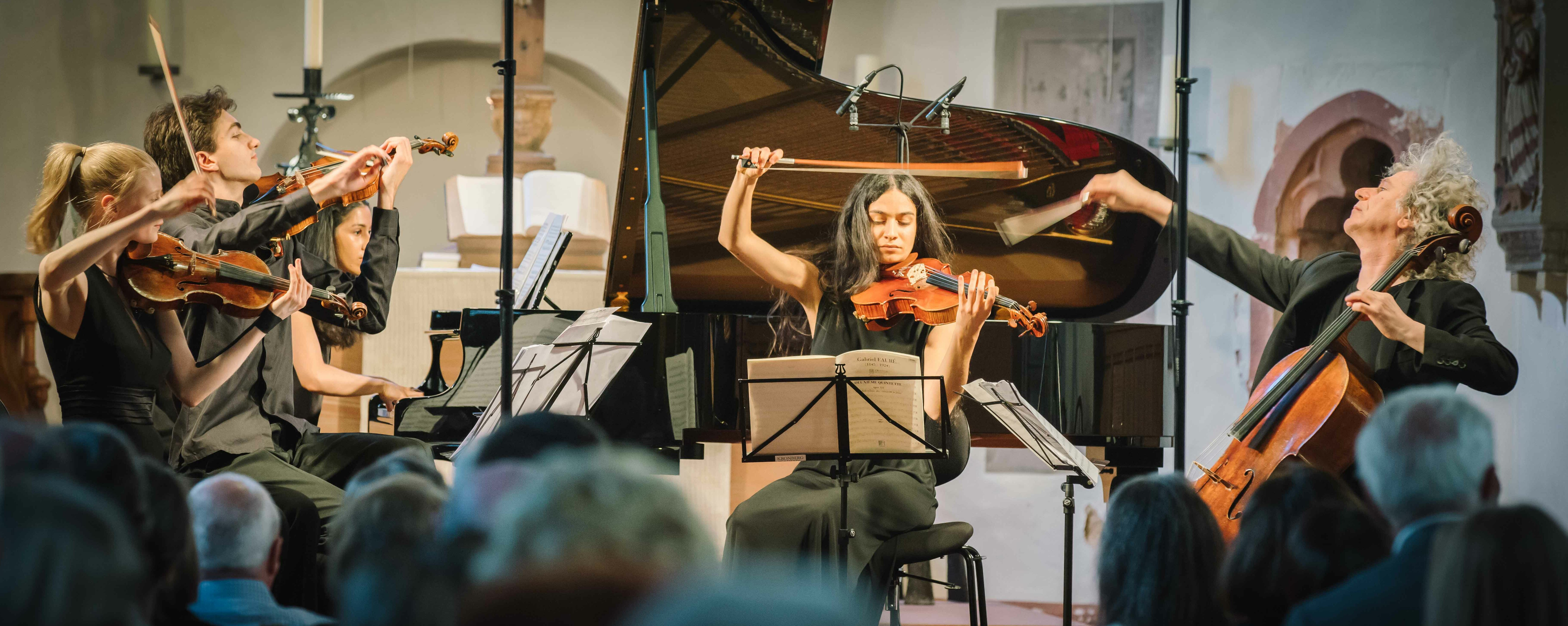
Chamber Music Connects the World with cellist Steven Isserlis

World-renowned artists have established foundations based in Kronberg:

- Rostropovich Cello Foundation
- Gidon Kremer Stiftung

Kronberg Academy also offers violin, viola and cello tuition for children and teenagers through the Emanuel Feuermann Conservatory. The conservatory is one of three representatives of the Associated Board of the Royal Schools of Music (ABRSM) in the state of Hesse.

Many of Kronberg's residents – who make up a substantial portion of the 2000 or so members (September 2023) of the Friends of Kronberg Academy – act as hosts for the numerous young string players from around the world who come to Kronberg for its workshops, concerts and festivals.

== Pablo Casals Award ==
As part of the Kronberg Festival,Kronberg Academy presents the Pablo Casals Award – For A Better World.

- 2022 Martin Helmchen and Marie-Elisabeth Hecker for their project Music Road Rwanda
- 2023 Lars Vogt for the project Rhapsody in School (posthumous)
- 2024 Jennifer Stumm for her artist collective Ilumina
- 2025 Midori for her commitment to social and educational projects, including Midori & Friends and Music Sharing
- 2026 Gabriela Montero in recognition of her longstanding and courageous commitment to democracy, human rights, and freedom in her native Venezuela.

== Notable alumni ==
- Nikita Boriso-Glebsky – violin
- Andreas Brantelid – cello
- Stella Chen – violin
- Timothy Chooi – violin
- Pablo Ferrández – cello
- Vilde Frang – violin
- William Hagen – violin
- Marie-Elisabeth Hecker – cello
- Alina Ibragimova – violin
- Ivan Karizna – cello
- Anastasia Kobekina – cello
- Harriet Krijgh – cello
- Anna Lee – violin
- Christel Lee – violin
- Niklas Liepe – violin
- Ji Young Lim – violin
- Edgar Moreau – cello
- Timothy Ridout – viola
- Alexander Sitkovetsky – violin
- Kian Soltani – cello
- Julian Steckel – cello
- Ella van Poucke – cello
- Stephen Waarts – violin
- Itamar Zorman – violin

== Notable faculty ==
- Ana Chumachenco – violin
- Kirill Gerstein – piano
- Martin Helmchen – piano
- Frans Helmerson – cello
- Nobuko Imai – viola
- Janine Jansen – violin
- Jens Peter Maintz – cello
- Nils Mönkemeyer – viola
- Ferenc Rados – piano
- Sir András Schiff – piano
- Christian Tetzlaff – violin
- Torleif Thedéen – cello
- Antje Weithaas – violin
- Tabea Zimmermann – viola
