= Chamber Orchestra of Europe =

London-based orchestra

- Orchestra
- Short name: COE
- Founded: 1981
- Location: London, United Kingdom
- Website: www.coeurope.org

The Chamber Orchestra of Europe (COE), established in 1981, is an orchestra whose office is based in London. The orchestra comprises about 60 members from across Europe. The players pursue parallel careers as international soloists, members of chamber groups and as tutors and teachers of music. The orchestra receives substantial support from the Gatsby Charitable Foundation, the Underwood Trust and a number of other Friends; they have no single home resident hall and no appointed resident conductor. The orchestra is a registered charity under English law.

The idea for the COE came from musicians in the European Community Youth Orchestra, from members who were past the age limit for the ECYO and who wanted to continue working together in a chamber orchestra context. The founding members included the oboist Douglas Boyd, who served as the COE's principal oboist from 1981 to 2002. Over the years the COE has developed strong relationships with Claudio Abbado, Bernard Haitink and Nikolaus Harnoncourt, together with Thomas Adès, Pierre-Laurent Aimard, Emanuel Ax, Lisa Batiashvili, Joshua Bell, Paavo Berglund, Renaud Capuçon and Gautier Capuçon, Isabelle Faust, Janine Jansen, Vladimir Jurowski, Leonidas Kavakos, Yannick Nézet-Séguin, Sakari Oramo, Murray Perahia, Maria João Pires, Sir András Schiff and Rolando Villazon among others.

The COE performs regularly in the major cities of Europe, with occasional visits to the United States, South Korea, Japan and Australia. The COE has strong links with many of the major festivals and concert halls in Europe including the Festspielhaus Baden-Baden, the Kammermusiksaal der Philharmonie in Berlin, the Cologne, Luxembourg and Paris Philharmonies, the Concertgebouw in Amsterdam and the Alte Oper in Frankfurt. The Chamber Orchestra of Europe has been “Residenzorchester Schloss Esterházy” in Eisenstadt since 2022. In partnership with the Kronberg Academy, the COE also became the first-ever Orchestra-in-residence at the Casals Forum in Kronberg in 2022. From 2007 to 2013, the COE was appointed cultural Ambassador by the European Union in its culture programme. The COE created the COE Academy in 2009 in order to provide opportunities to gifted music students to study with COE musicians.

== Recordings ==
The orchestra has made over 250 commercial recordings for all the major recording companies with various conductors, including Claudio Abbado, Paavo Berglund, Nikolaus Harnoncourt, and Yannick Nézet-Séguin. The orchestra has won a number of prizes for its recordings, including three Gramophone Awards for the Record of the Year and two Grammys. The COE was the first orchestra to create its own label, COE Records, in association with ASV Records (now distributed by Sanctuary/Universal Music).

== Honorary members ==
The orchestra has awarded honorary membership to selected special collaborators: formerly the late Nikolaus Harnoncourt, Alice Harnoncourt, Bernard Haitink, and today Yannick Nézet-Séguin, Sir Antonio Pappano, Sir Simon Rattle, Sir András Schiff and Robin Ticciati.

== See also ==
- European Union Baroque Orchestra
- European Union Chamber Orchestra
- European Union Youth Orchestra
