= Ella van Poucke =

Dutch cellist (born 1994)

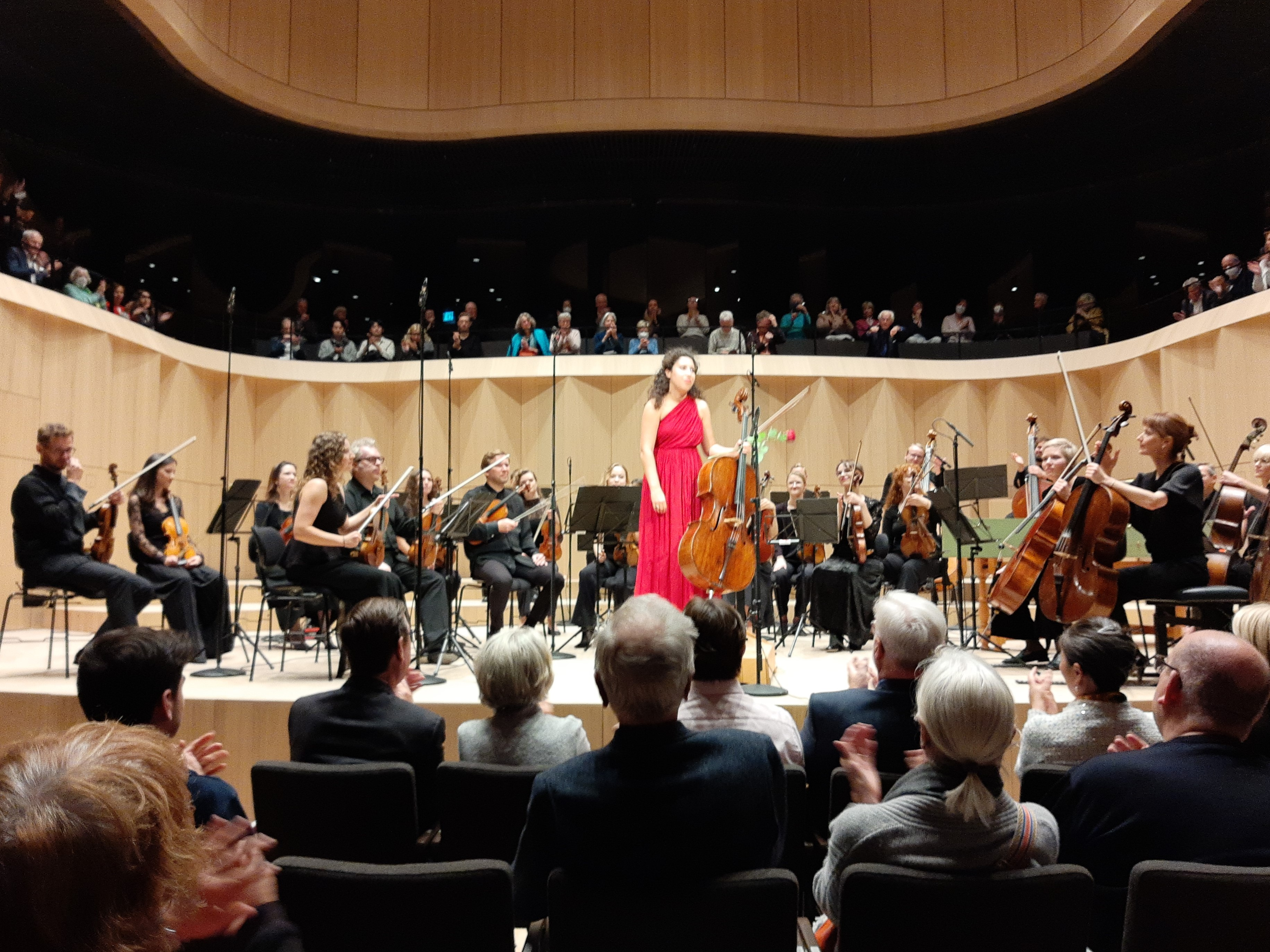
- Poucke and the Kremerata Baltica at the Casals Forum in 2022
- Born: 1994 (age 30–31); Amsterdam, Netherlands
- Education: Royal Conservatory of The Hague; Conservatorium van Amsterdam; Kronberg Academy
- Occupations: Classical cellist; Festival director; Academic teacher
- Organizations: Chamber Music Festival Amsterdam; Conservatorium van Amsterdam
- Website: Official website

Ella van Poucke (born 1994) is a Dutch classical cellist. She has performed internationally as a soloist and chamber musician. From 2010, she has directed a chamber music festival in Amsterdam. Poucke has lectured at the Conservatorium van Amsterdam from September 2022.

== Career ==
Poucke was born in Amsterdam in 1994 to a family of musicians. She received cello lessons from age six, and studied at the Royal Conservatory of The Hague from age ten. She studied at the Conservatorium van Amsterdam with Godfried Hoogeveen, taking masterclasses with Steven Isserlis, Menahem Pressler and András Schiff, among others. She studied at the Kronberg Academy with Frans Helmerson from 2009 to 2016, supported by an Opel/Schaefer Scholarship. She then became artist in residence at the Queen Elisabeth Music Chapel in Brussels, studying with Gary Hoffman until 2019.

Poucke played at the Concertgebouw in Amsterdam first at age ten. She has performed as a soloist with orchestras such Netherlands Philharmonic Orchestra, Brussels Philharmonic Orchestra, the Rotterdam Philharmonic Strings, Varsovia Chamber Orchestra, the Camerata Wrocław, Tongyeong Festival Orchestra, working with conductors including Michael Sanderling and Christoph Eschenbach.

Poucke is a member of the Amsterdam Chamber Music Society. Her chamber music partners have included violinists Vilde Frang, Gidon Kremer and Christian Tetzlaff, and violist Tabea Zimmermann, among others. In 2010, she founded with her brother, the pianist Nicolas van Poucke, the Chamber Music Festival Amsterdam, serving as its artistic director. She was chosen “Rising Star” in Amsterdam, giving her the chance to perform two programs of her choice at the Concertgebouw in Amsterdam in the 2013/14 season.

In November 2012, she was the soloist in the world premiere of a cello concerto composed for her by Uljas Pulkkis. She played it at the International Cello Biennale in Amsterdam, and repeated it at the 2013 Kronberg Festival with members of the hr-Sinfonieorchester. When the Kronberg Academy's new concert hall, the Casals Forum, opened in 2022, she appeared as a soloist, playing Haydn's Cello Concerto No. 1 with the Kremerata Baltica.

For her first recording, she chose the complete works for cello by Robert Schumann, the Cello Concerto, with the Phíon Orchestra conducted by Günter Neuhold, and works for cello and piano, with pianist Jean-Claude Vanden Eynden. A reviewer from Gramophone credited her with "a strong feel for Schumann's Romantic sensibility", and noted that her playing in the concerto was "distinguished by its spontaneity and delicacy".

Poucke has lectured at the Conservatorium van Amsterdam. from 1 September 2022. She played a cello built by Pieter Rombouts (1667–1740), and turned to an instrument built in 1620 by Giovanni Paolo Maggini, both on loan from an anonymous sponsor.

Her awards include being named Dutch Musician of the Year in 2012, the special prize for an outstanding performance at the Grand Prix Emanuel Feuermann in 2014, and the first prize at the 2015 Isang Yun cello competition 2015.
