= Gunzenhauser =

Gunzenhauser may refer to:

- Gunzenhauser Museum, a museum and art gallery located in Chemnitz, Germany
- Stephen Gunzenhauser (born 1942), American conductor
