= Anna Lee (violinist) =

American concert violinist (born 1995)

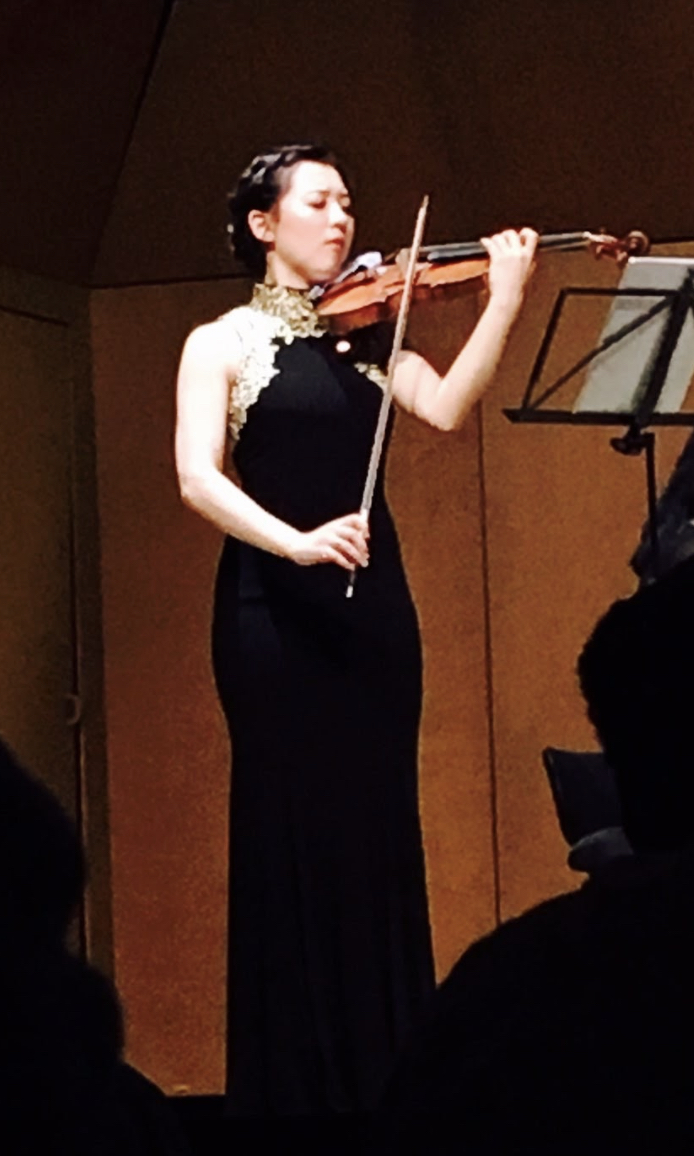
- Lee performing in Kronberg, Germany in June 2017

Background information
- Born: 11 July 1995 (age 31); Seoul, South Korea
- Occupation: Violinist

Anna Ji-eun Lee (Korean: 이지은), known professionally as Anna Lee, is an American concert violinist of Korean descent. She made her professional orchestral debut at the age of 6 with the Singapore Symphony Orchestra.

== Early life and education ==
Anna Lee was born in Seoul, South Korea. She started violin lessons at the age of 4, and soon after began formal training with Alexander Souptel after her family moved to Singapore. Two years later, she performed a sold-out concert at age 6 in Victoria Concert Hall, performing the first movement of the Paganini Violin Concerto No. 1 on invitation from maestro Lan Shui, music director of the Singapore Symphony Orchestra. A few months later, she and her family moved to New York City after she was accepted to the Pre-College Division of the Juilliard School to study with Masao Kawasaki. Lee finished her studies with Masao Kawasaki and Cho-Liang Lin and graduated from the Juilliard School Pre-College Division and the Dalton School in 2013. She then matriculated at Harvard College, majoring in Comparative Literature, and took several leaves of absences to accommodate her performing career, eventually graduating in May 2020. She also completed a formal study abroad program in Paris, where she took courses in Critical Theory, Media Studies, and Comparative Literature at the Sorbonne University and the New Sorbonne University.

While living in Boston, Lee studied with Miriam Fried and Donald Weilerstein; between 2014 and 2017, she studied with Ana Chumachenco at the Kronberg Academy. She earned a Master of Musical Arts from the Yale School of Music in 2023, studying with Ani Kavafian, where she received the Raymond Plank Residency at the Ucross Foundation Award and the Horatio Parker Memorial Prize. She is currently Artist in Residence and completing an Artist Diploma at the Queen Elisabeth Music Chapel.

== Career ==
=== Soloist ===
As a soloist, Lee made her New York Philharmonic debut with maestro Daniel Boico in 2011, as well as her Frankfurt debut in 2016 with maestro Christoph Eschenbach and the Hessische Rundfunk Radio Orchestra. She has appeared with other notable orchestras, such as the Singapore Symphony Orchestra, the Indianapolis Symphony Orchestra, the Belgian National Orchestra, and the Montreal Symphony Orchestra. She has also collaborated with conductors including David Danzmayr, Peter Oundjian, and Andrés Orozco-Estrada.

She has been featured in music festivals around the world such as the Gstaad Menuhin Festival, as well as on radio shows such as From the Top with host Christopher O’Riley and NPR Performance Today with host Fred Child. She was also one of the youngest performers at the EG Conference, presenting alongside other notable figures such as Mark Bittman, Marc-Andre Hamelin, Anderson & Roe, Esther Wojcicki, Dick Cavett, Cady Coleman, and Cameron Carpenter.

=== Chamber music ===
Lee has collaborated with artists such as Mitsuko Uchida, Gidon Kremer, Sol Gabetta, Wu Han, Yuri Bashmet, and Steven Isserlis at internationally renowned chamber music festivals, most notably the Marlboro Music Festival, Chamber Music Northwest, Seoul Spring Festival, La Jolla Summerfest, Gstaad Menuhin Festival, and Kronberg Academy's "Chamber Music Connects the World". She has also been invited on "Musicians from Marlboro" Tours across the United States and Canada.

=== Teaching ===
Lee has taught chamber music at international summer festivals, most notably at the Kronberg Academy's Mit Musik - Miteinander festival in Germany, Festival MusicAlp in France, and the Classical Music Institute in San Antonio, Texas.

== Publications and media ==
Lee has been featured in publications such as the Wall Street Journal Magazine, the Harvard Gazette, and Asian Fortune. She has also been a guest writer for the Office for the Arts at Harvard as well as for the Sungjoo Foundation.

At age 9, she was interviewed by Fred Child on NPR's Performance Today, performing the first movement of the Wieniawski Violin Concerto No. 1. A few years later, she appeared in two more shows of NPR's From the Top, and was invited to feature as a soloist and chamber musician on From the Top's limited PBS series, From the Top at Carnegie Hall.

She was also featured on "Pause for Art: Creative Moments from Harvard", a series produced by the Office for the Arts at Harvard, collaborating with composer Sam Wu and dancer Ileana Riveron to close out the series as well as the portion dedicated to Harvard Seniors.

== Competitions and awards ==
In May 2020, the Office for the Arts at Harvard co-awarded Anna Lee and visual artist George Liu the Louis Sudler Prize in the Arts, which "recognizes outstanding artistic talent and achievement in the composition of performance of music, drama, dance, or the visual arts . . . [and] honors the sum of a student's artistic activities at Harvard". Other awards include the Bernhard and Mania Hahnloser Prize from the Verbier Festival Academy, From the Top's Jack Kent Cooke Young Artist Award, the Prinz von Hessen prize from the Kronberg Academy Violin Masterclasses, the Artist Development Fellowship from the Office for the Arts at Harvard, the Raymond Plank Residency at the Ucross Foundation Award, and the Horatio Parker Memorial Prize.

She has claimed numerous top and special prizes at competitions, such as in the 2019 Montréal International Violin Competition, the 2018 International Violin Competition of Indianapolis, 2020 Ysaÿe International Music Competition, the 2022 Classic Strings Competition Dubai, the 2011 Sion-Valais International Violin Competition (renamed the Tibor Varga International Violin Competition), the 2010 and 2012 Yehudi Menuhin International Competition (Junior and Senior Divisions, respectively), the Aspen Music Festival's 2009 American Academy of Conducting Competition, and the 2008 Blount-Slawson Young Artist Competition.

== Instrument ==
Previously, she was one of the youngest recipients of the Stradivari Society for several years, which generously loaned her a Nicolò Amati (c.1635-40) violin. She also previously played on a Giovanni Tononi violin, dated ca. 1690, on a loan from the Ravinia’s Steans Music Institute.
