= Casals Forum =

German concert hall for chamber music

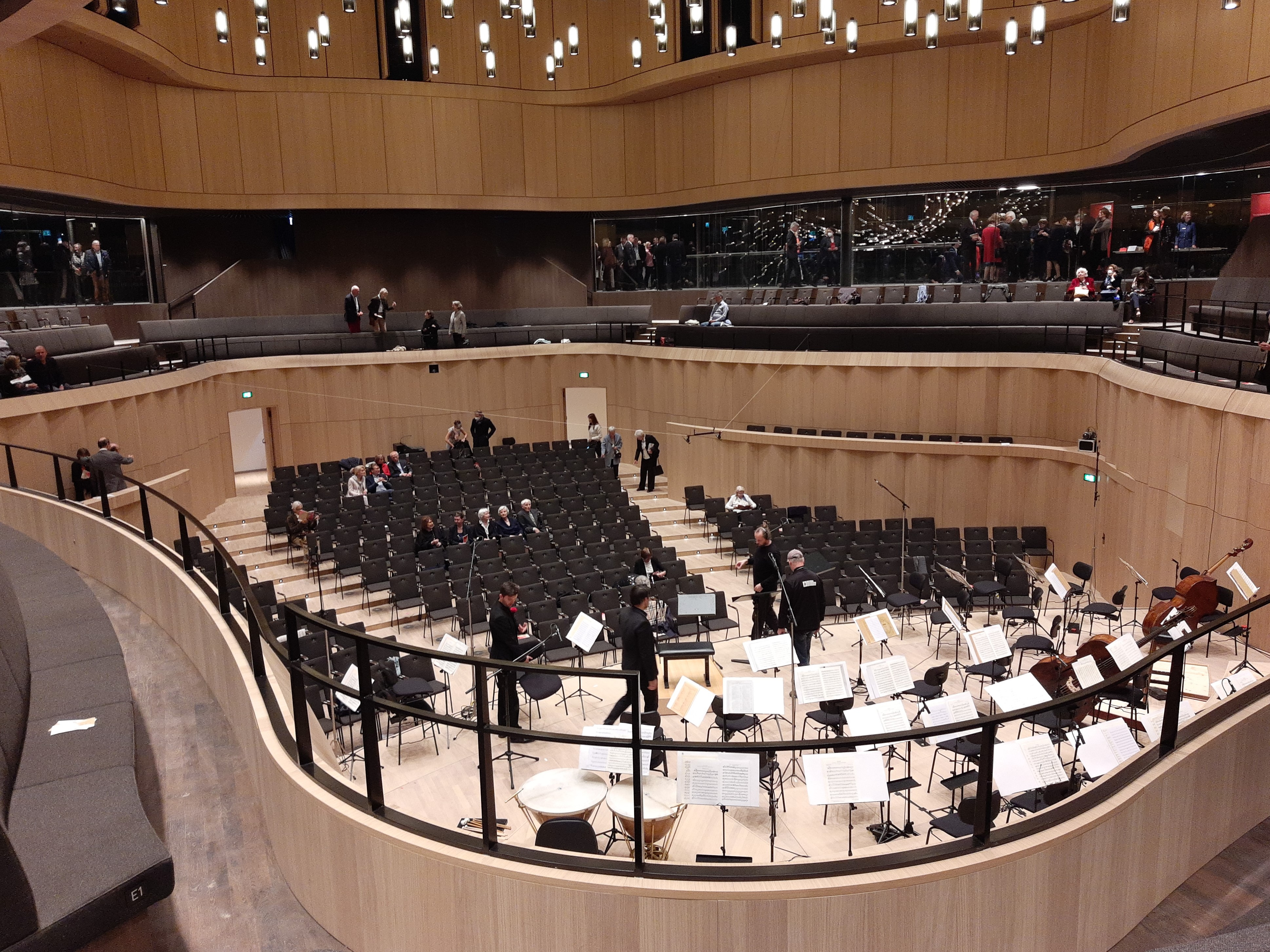
- The hall on 25 September 2022
- Interactive map of Casals Forum
- Location: Kronberg im Taunus, Hesse, Germany
- Coordinates: 50°10′51″N 08°30′52″E
- Capacity: 550

Construction
- Groundbreaking: 2017
- Opened: 2022
- Architect: Volker Staab

Casals Forum is the concert hall for chamber music of the Kronberg Academy in Kronberg im Taunus, Hesse, Germany. Designed by Volker Staab from Berlin, building started in 2017 and the hall opened in 2022. It is named in honour of the cellist Pablo Casals. The complex includes rooms for teaching and practising for the students of the academy. Per the requests from the acoustic engineer, the architect designed the hall in a free form with curved convex and concave walls, to spread the sound widely. The acoustics have been compared to those of the hall of the Curtis Institute of Music and Wigmore Hall in London.

== History ==
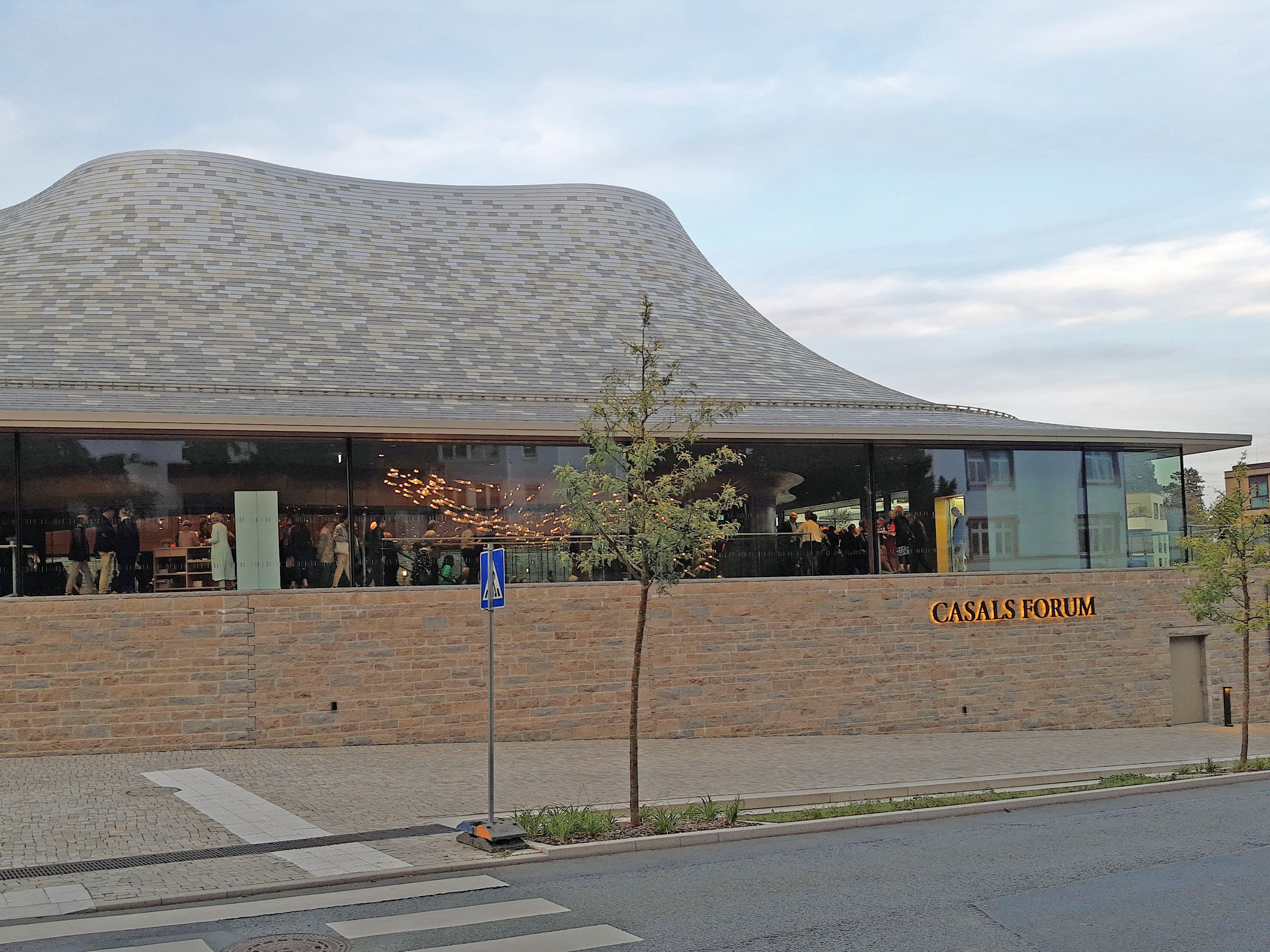
Casals Forum

The Kronberg Academy, an international educational institution for string players, has been located in Kronberg since 1993. It runs concerts and an annual festival. The Casals Forum was built as a concert venue and study facility for the institution. Raimund Trenkler, the founder and president of the academy, explained that it was named after Pau Casals who was recognised as a model for both music making and humanity from the beginning of the academy; its first cello festival on the 20th anniversary of the cellist's death in 1993. His widow, Marta Casals Istomin, has remained the patron of the event.

The cornerstone of the new building was laid on 1 October 2017. Building costs were then estimated as €36 million. As of 2022, costs of c. €60M were mostly covered by private sponsors, with support from Kronberg, the Hochtaunuskreis district, the state of Hesse and the federal government.

The hall was opened on 23 September 2022 in the presence of Angela Dorn, the minister of the arts in Hesse. Around 80 concerts are planned each year. The Casals Forum will be the new home of the Chamber Orchestra of Europe, which is moving from London.

The opening was celebrated with a festival of 24 concerts, including students and soloists such as Gidon Kremer, András Schiff and Tabea Zimmermann. Ensembles included the Chamber Orchestra of Europe, hr-Sinfonieorchester, Kremerata Baltica, Stuttgarter Kammerorchester, and Ensemble Resonanz. After the opening, the hall was regarded as a place for highest musical demands ("Ort für höchste musikalische Ansprüche"), and its quality was compared to those of the hall of the Curtis Institute of Music and Wigmore Hall in London.

== Building ==
The hall is located next to the Kronberg station, and to the municipal park. It was designed by the Berlin architect Volker Staab, who collaborated with the acoustic engineers Martijn Vercammen and Margriet Lautenbach from the Dutch consultancy Peutz.

The main hall seats an audience of 550, the Bechstein hall seats 150, and a study centre is located in an adjacent building. Per the requests from the acoustic engineer, the architect designed the hall in a free form with curved convex and concave walls, to spread the sound widely. Walls in the hall are covered by light-brown wood. The curved space is reminiscent of the shape of a stringed instrument, and musicians said after the first rehearsal that "it felt and sounded as if you were playing inside a violin" ("es fühle sich an und klinge so, als ob man im Inneren einer Geige spiele"). On the top level, a front of fanned glass panes offers views of the park. The climate control is efficient by an innovative storage technology for climate-neutral operation.

=== Visual art ===
The Casals Forum has on display a collection of sculptures and installations including works by Tony Cragg, Antoni Tàpies, Karin Sander and Studio Drift, and a bust of Casals by Robert Berks.
