= Gustav Wunderwald =

German painter

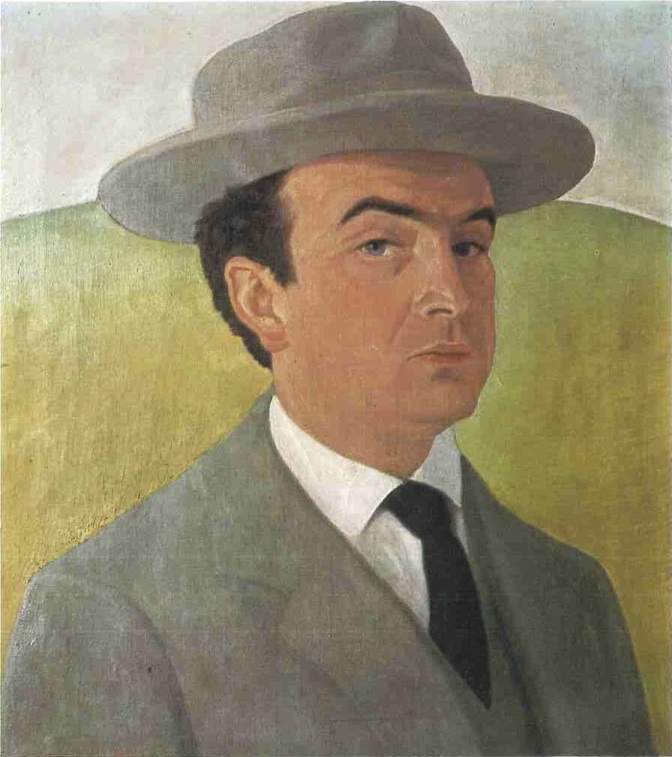
- Self-portrait of Gustav Wunderwald, 1914
- Born: 1 January 1882; Kalk, Cologne, Kingdom of Prussia, German Empire
- Died: 24 June 1945 (aged 63); Berlin, Germany
- Known for: Painting
- Movement: New Objectivity

Gustav Wunderwald (1 January 1882 – 24 June 1945) was a German painter of the New Objectivity style, and a theatrical set designer.

== Career ==
The son of the gunsmith Karl Wunderwald and his wife Adelheid née Hirtz, Gustav Wunderwald was born in Kalk, Cologne in 1882. Beginning his artistic career in 1896, Wunderwald began as an apprentice of the Cologne master painter Wilhelm Kuhn. In 1899 he became a scenery painter under Professor Max Bruckner, and from 1900 to 1904 he worked at G. Hartwig's studio for stage painting in Charlottenburg. From 1904 to 1907 he worked as a set designer at the Royal Swedish Opera. Then he joined the Drama and Music Executive Board of the Theatre in Düsseldorf under Louise Dumont and Gustav Lindemann. It was here that he also had the first exhibition of his art, and he met his longtime friend, the Rhenish writer and playwright Wilhelm Schmidtbonn (1876–1952). In May 1908 he married Amalie Minna Gerull (1881–1941). With her and the Schmidtbonns he spent the years 1908 to 1909 in Tegernsee.

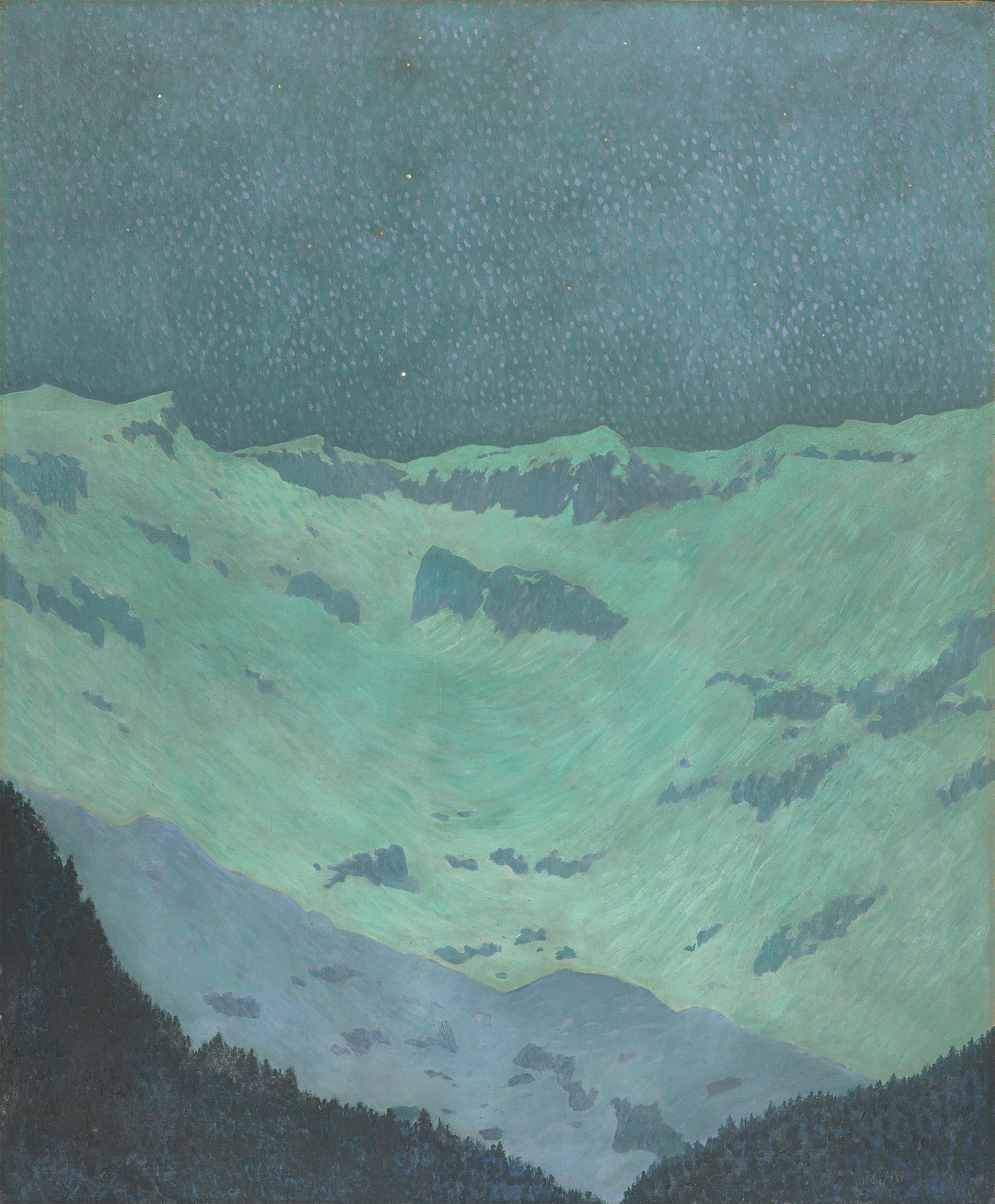
Moonlight in The Mountains, 1909

After leaving his position in Düsseldorf, which had earned him recognition from renowned theatre critics, he decided to live and work for a year "in nature", as an experiment. But in 1909 he returned to conventional employment, when he worked briefly as a member of the technical staff at the Stadttheater Innsbruck. In 1910 he moved to Freiburg, where he held the position of the Chief Stage Painter at the Municipal Theatre until 1911. He held an exhibition in the Kunstverein Freiburg in March 1911. In 1912 Wunderwald made the longed-for career move to Berlin: He worked as a decorative painter at the Deutsche Oper Berlin in Charlottenburg until 1915, when he was called up. During World War I he was posted to the Macedonian front.

Up to the war, in addition to his stage scenery work, Wunderwald created realistic paintings and drawings of the Rhineland, Tyrol, the Black Forest, Havel and East Prussian landscapes. He also did figure paintings of his wife, family members and fellow soldiers. In 1918 Wunderwald realized his lifelong dream; from that time until his death in 1945 Wunderwald worked as a freelance artist in Charlottenburg. In 1924 the Berlin Art and Landsberg bookshop displayed 20 of his works in his first comprehensive solo exhibition. In 1925 and 1926, Wunderwald was represented at the Great Berlin Art Exhibition, and from 1927 in numerous national exhibitions. His works dealt with industrial landscapes in the Berlin districts of Moabit and Wedding, street canyons of Prenzlauer Berg, tenements, houses and back-to-backs in Spandau. He painted bridges, subways, train stations, billboards, as well as villas in Charlottenburg. Rural subjects included villages in the immediate vicinity of Berlin, Havel, Spree and East Prussia landscapes. People were reduced to the role of anonymous figures seen from behind.

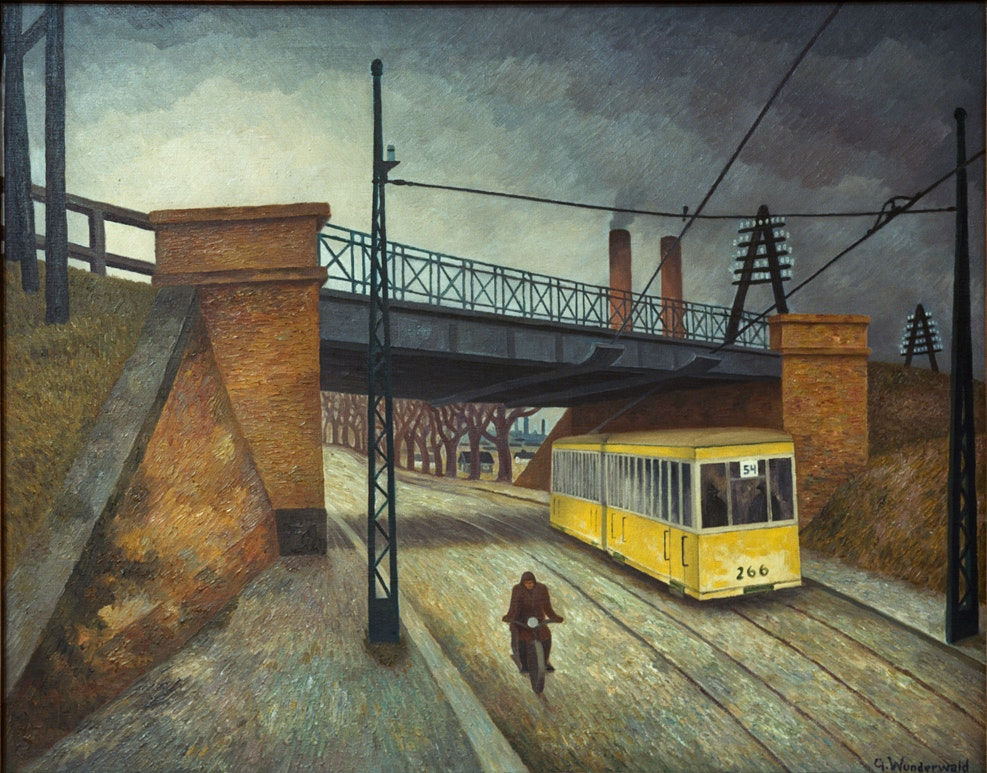
Underpass in Spandau, 1927

Of this period of his creativity he wrote: "The saddest things hit me in the stomach. Moabit and Wedding grab me most with their sombreness and desolation" (1926). In 1927 on the occasion of the group exhibition "The face of Berlin 1926" at the Neumann & Nierendorf gallery, the art critic Paul Westheim (1886–1963) devoted a monographic essay to Wunderwald in the January issue of the Art Journal which he edited, in which he described Wunderwald as "the Berlin Utrillo" a label that Wunderwald felt flattered him.

The final Wunderwald exhibition before the Second World War took place at the 1934 Great Berlin Art Exhibition. In the Nazi era, his works were disparaged by the authorities and from 1934 he was not allowed to exhibit or sell work. During this period he made a living tinting advertising films for Ufa and Mars Film, and looked after his wife, a seamstress. After her death, Wunderwald married Bertha Ludwig in 1941. However he himself died on 24 June 1945 in Berlin, as a result of hyponatremia (water poisoning).

== Legacy ==
The rediscovery of Wunderwald's work after the Second World War was initiated in 1950 by Friedrich Lambart, head of the Berlin art office, with the retrospective "Berlin im Bild" (Berlin in Pictures) at the Tiergarten Town Hall. This was followed by solo exhibitions in Berlin (Haus am Lützowplatz, 1962, and Galerie Bassenge, 1971/72), Munich (Galerie Gunzenhauser, 1972), Berlin (Märkisches Museum,1992), and, from 1965 onward, due to the growing interest in New Objectivity art, participation in numerous national and international group exhibitions. The most comprehensive retrospectives were held by the Berlinische Galerie in 1982 and the Städtische Galerie Albstadt in 1982/83 to mark the 100th anniversary of the painter's birth. Recently, works by Gustav Wunderwald have been featured more frequently in exhibitions, including at the Kunstmuseum Bonn (“The Flâneur: From Impressionism to the Present,” 2018/19), the Museum Gunzenhauser Chemnitz (“New Objectivity: Art in the Weimar Republic,” 2019), the Chemnitz Art Collections (“Otto Dix and New Objectivity,” 2026), and the Neue Nationalgalerie Berlin (“Ruin and Rush: Berlin 1910–1930”, 2026/27).

Wunderwald’s painted oeuvre comprises approximately 180 paintings, of which about 40 are considered lost. His work is predominantly located in Germany, in private collections and in the collections of the following museums: Berlinische Galerie, Berlin; Neue Nationalgalerie, Berlin; Märkisches Museum of the Stiftung Stadtmuseum Berlin; Stadtmuseum Bonn; Museum Gunzenhauser of the Chemnitz Art Collections; Hessisches Landesmuseum, Darmstadt; Theaterwissenschaftliche Sammlung der Universität Köln; Kunstforum Ostdeutsche Galerie, Regensburg; State Museums of Berlin of the Prussian Cultural Heritage Foundation.

== Gallery ==
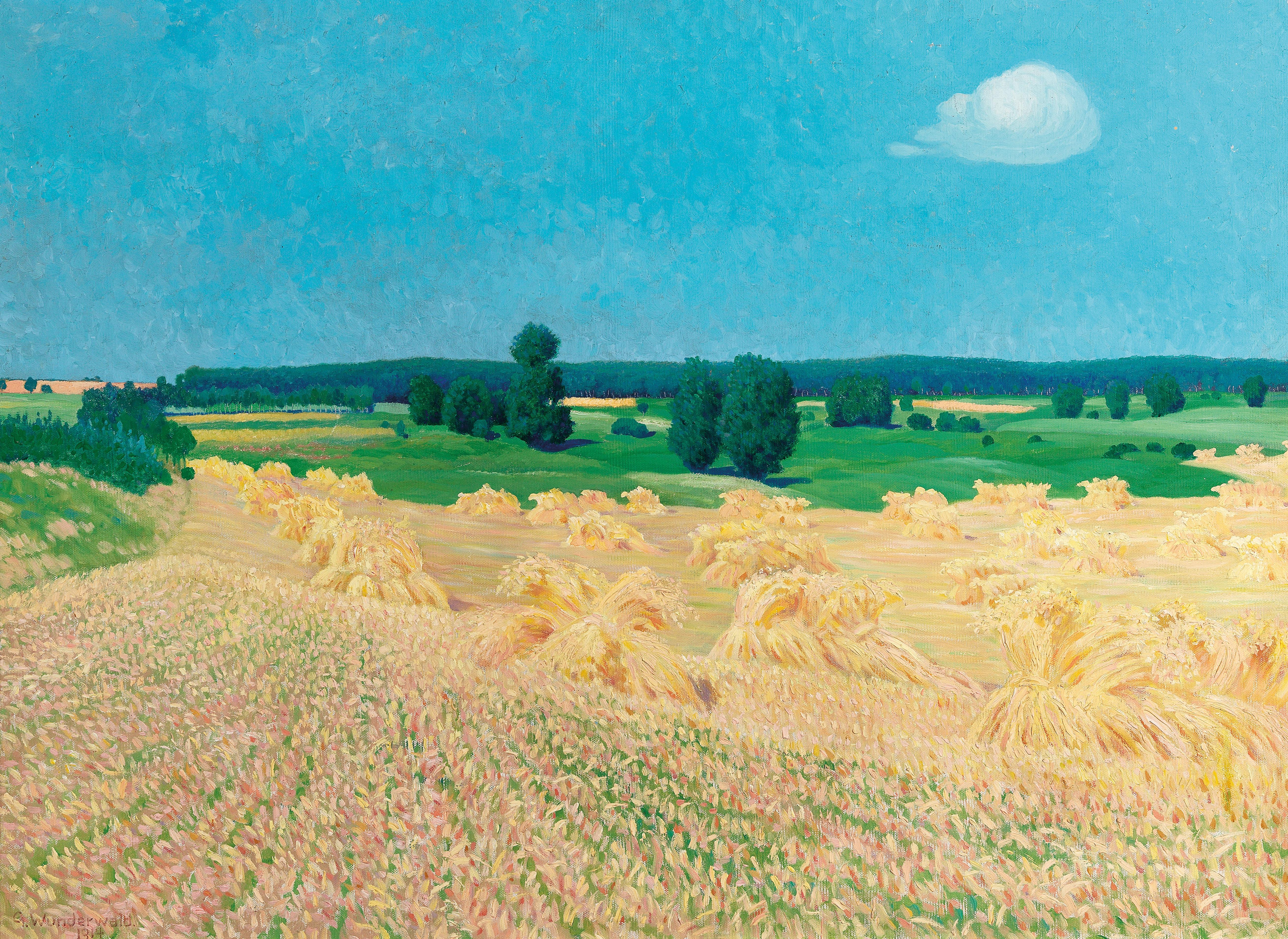
Sommerlandschaft, dated and signed: "G. Wunderwald 1914", oil on canvas, 80 × 110 cm

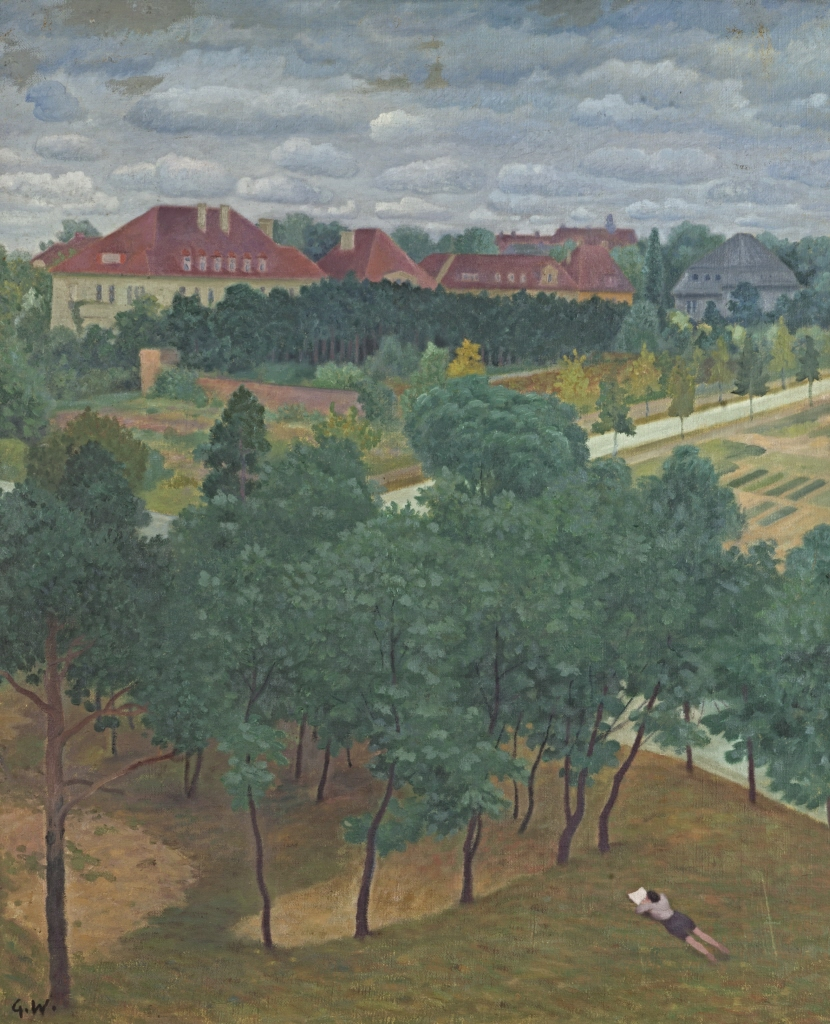
Berlin-Westend, signed: "G.W.", 1916, oil on canvas, 90 × 80 cm, Berlinische Galerie, Berlin

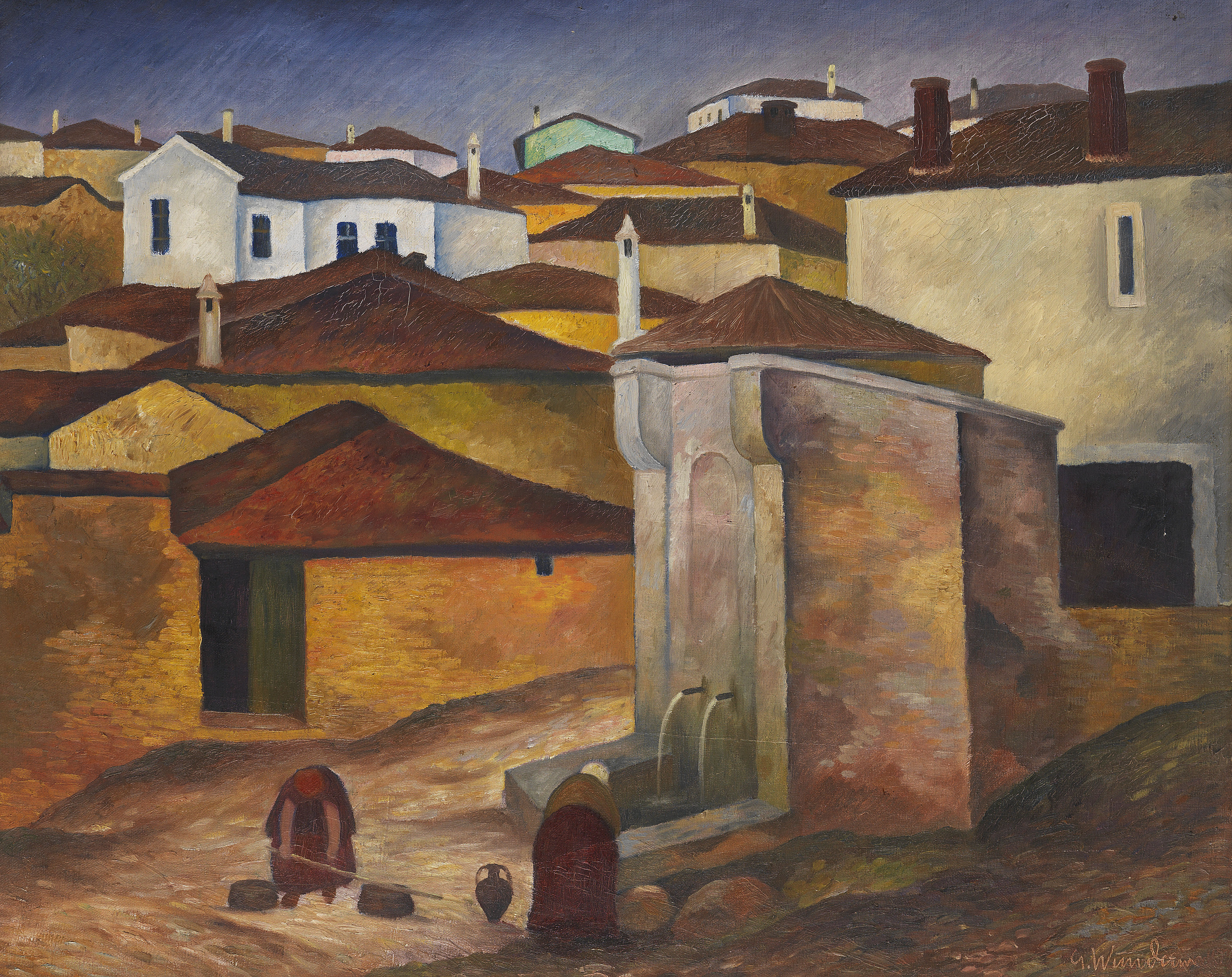
Brunnen in Veles (Mazedonien), signed: "G. Wunderwald", 1919, oil on canvas, 61 × 75 cm

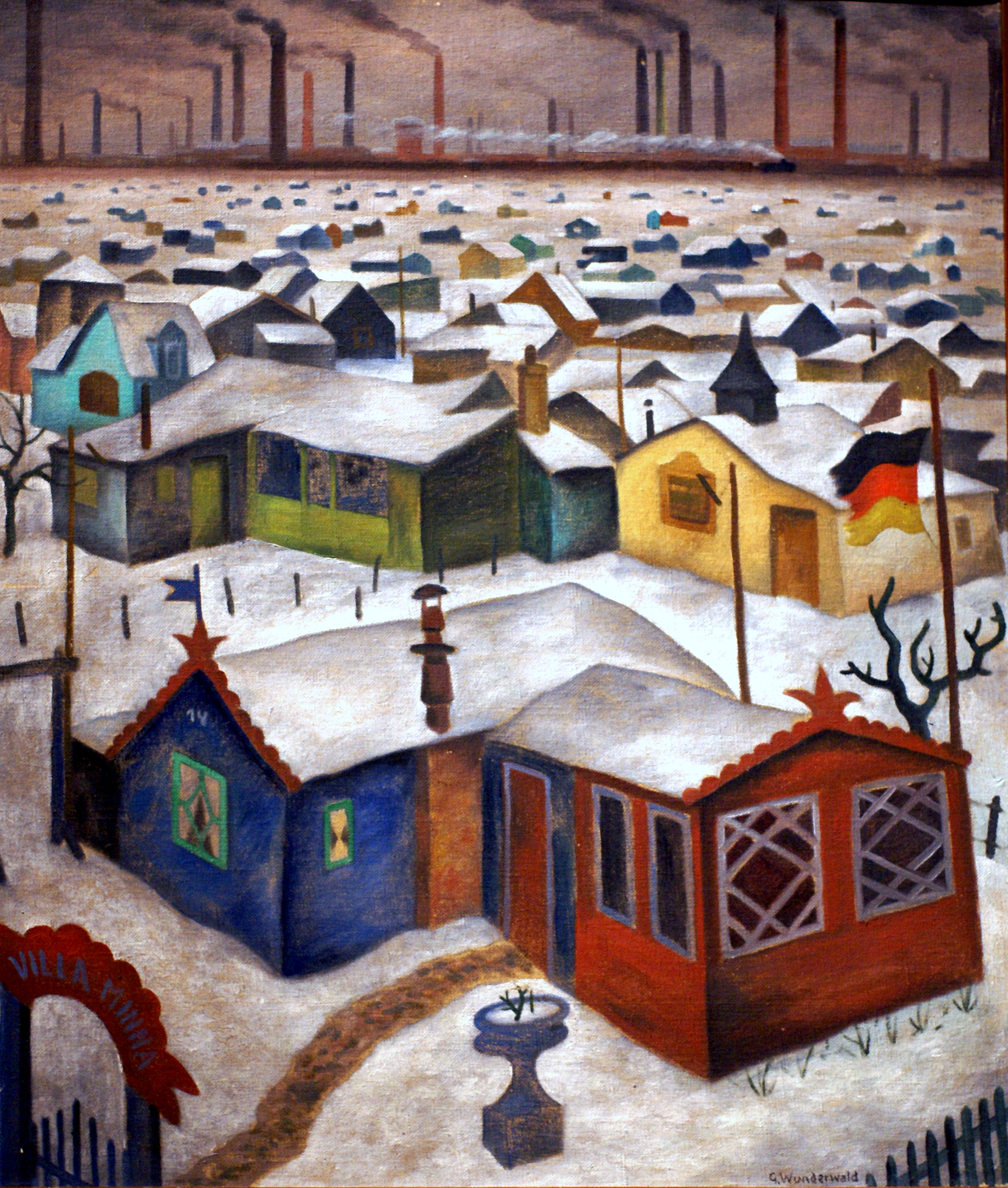
Laubenkolonie, signed: "G. Wunderwald", 1923, oil on canvas,74 × 60 cm

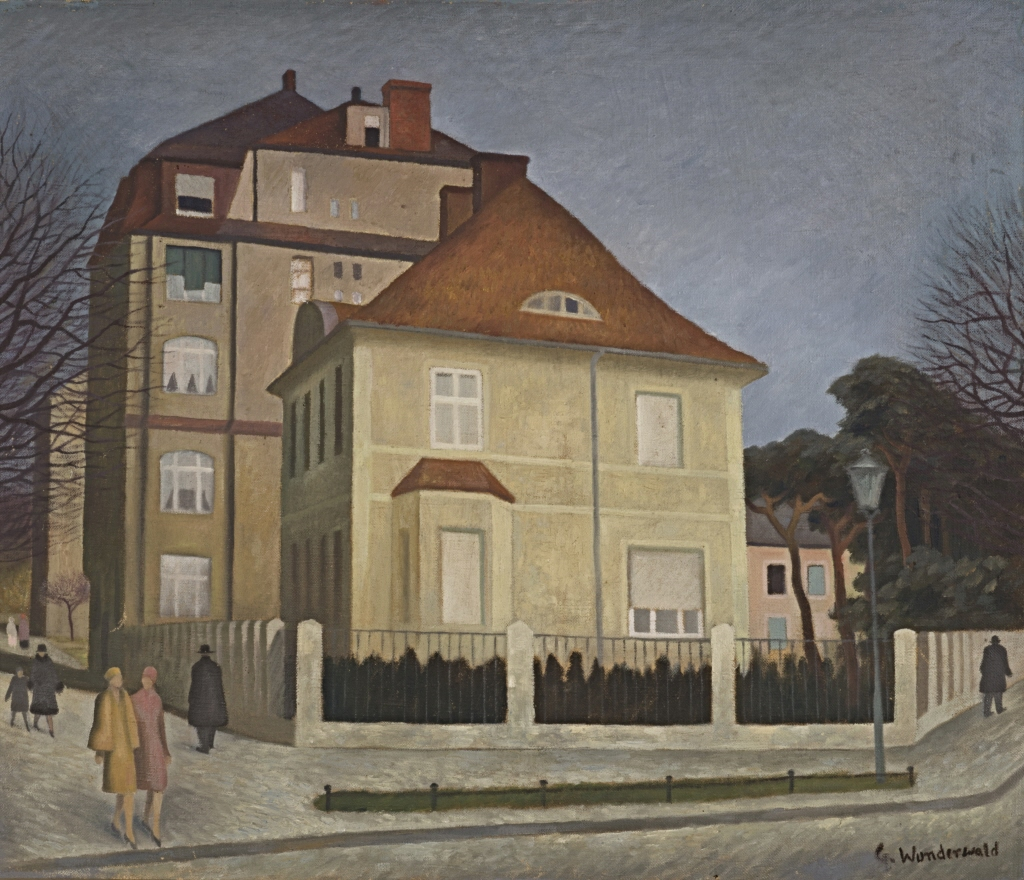
Am Kaiserdamm, signed: "G. Wunderwald", 1926, oil on canvas,, 62 × 72 cm, Berlinische Galerie, Berlin

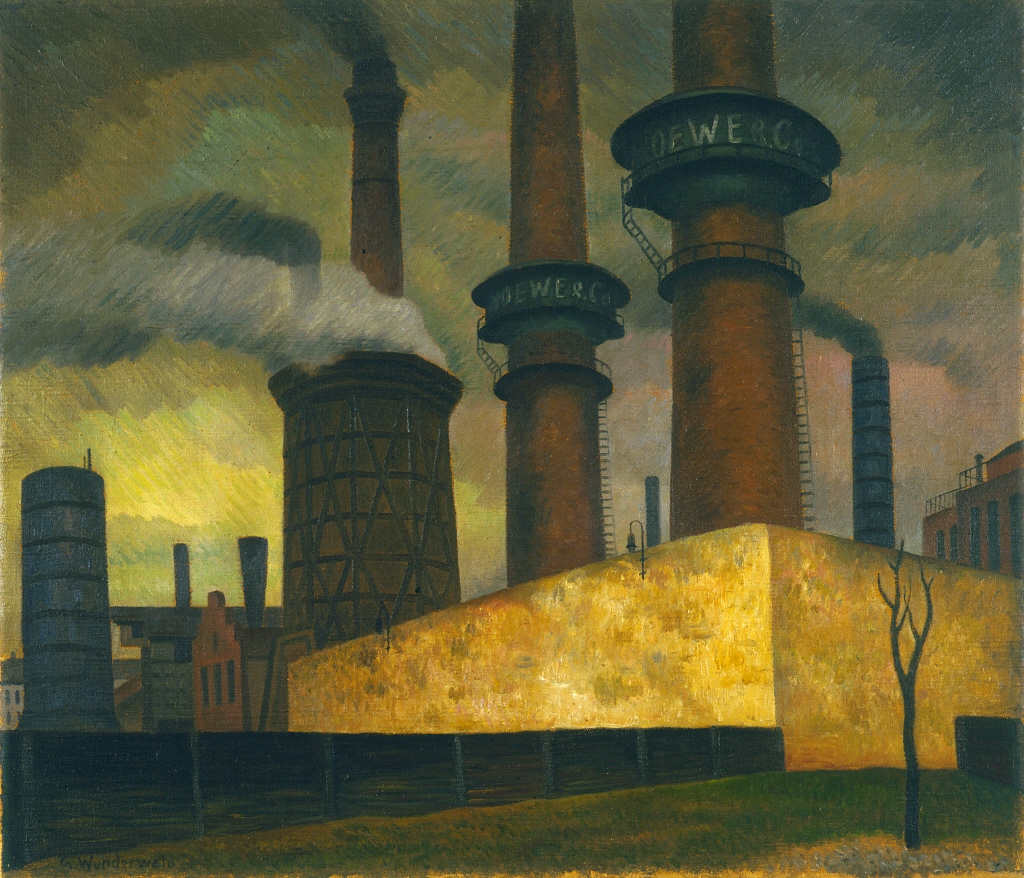
Fabrik von Loewe & Co. (Moabit), signed: "G. Wunderwald", 1926, oil on canvas, 61 × 71 cm, Berlinische Galerie, Berlin

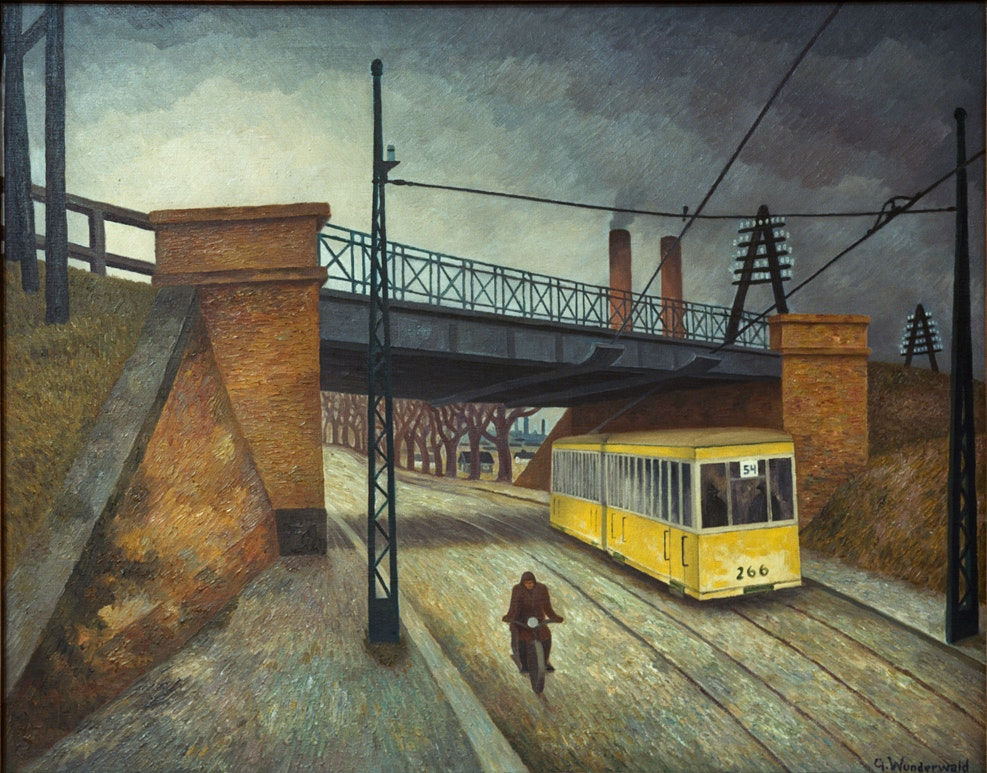
Unterführung in Spandau, signed: "G. Wunderwald", 1926, oil on canvas, 66,3 × 83,7 cm, University of Wisconsin-Milwaukee, Milwaukee, USA

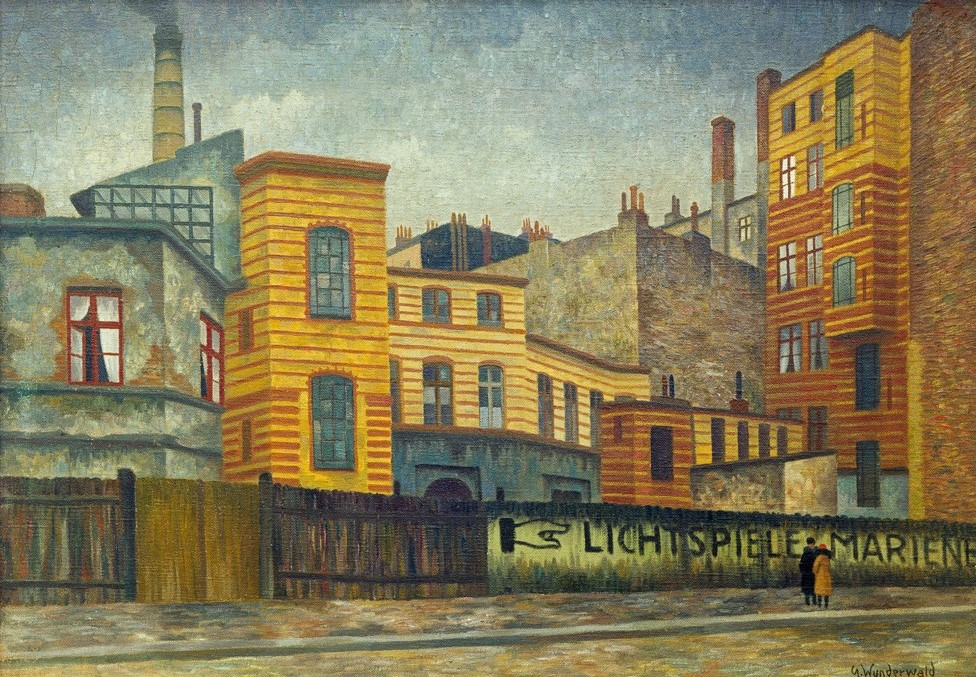
An der Travemünder Straße (Berlin N), signed: "G. Wunderwald", 1927, oil on canvas, 61 × 85 cm, Berlinische Galerie, Berlin

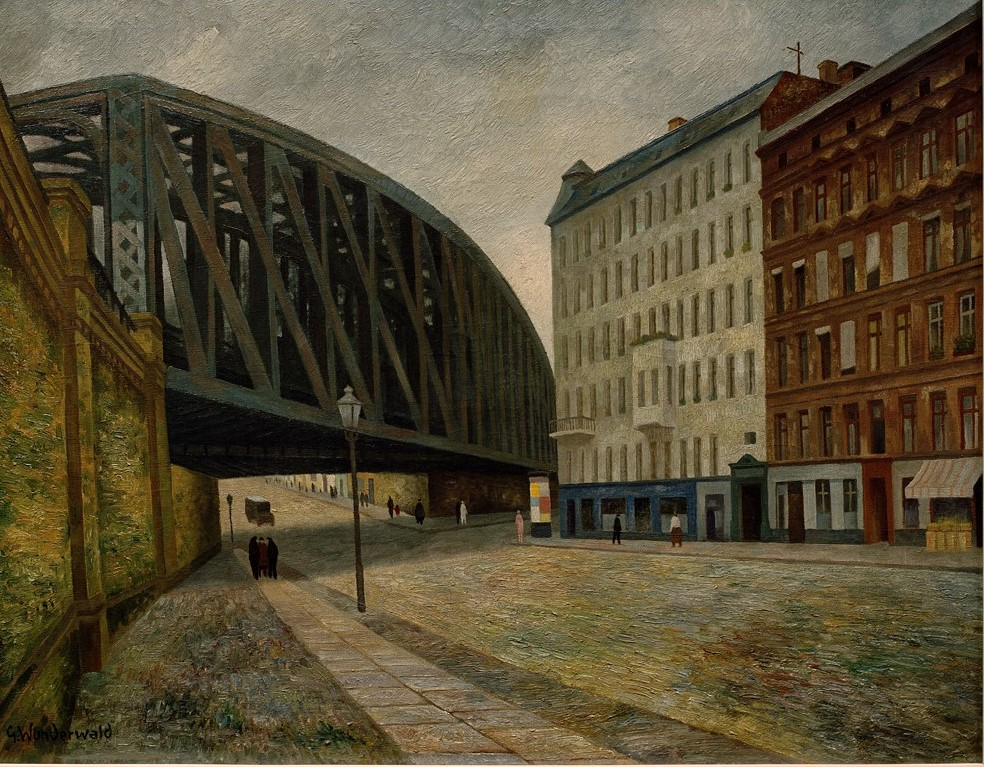
Brücke über die Ackerstraße, signed: "G. Wunderwald", 1927, oil on canvas, 66 × 84 cm, Bankgesellschaft Berlin AG

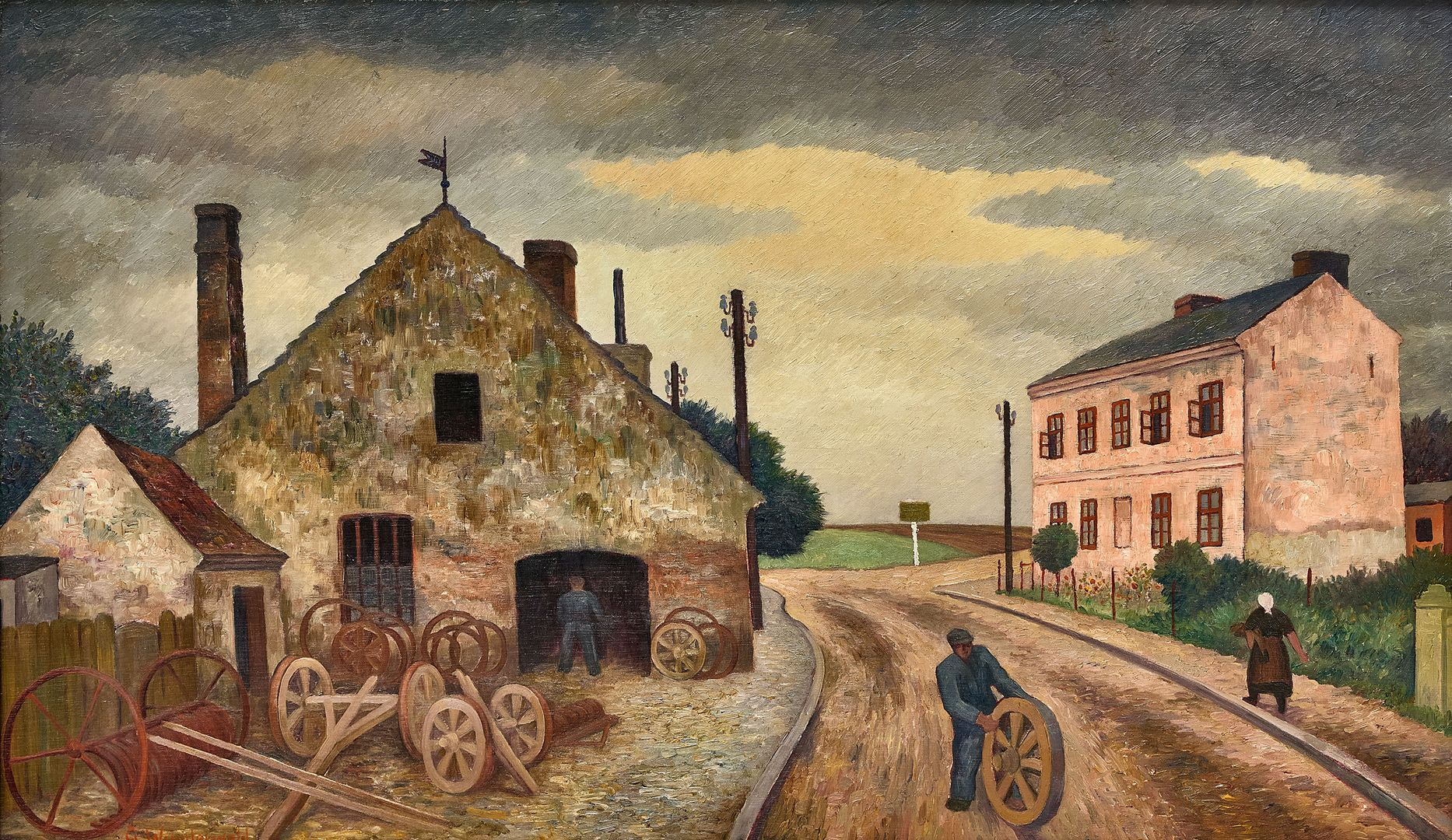
Dorf in der Mark, signed: "G. Wunderwald", 1930, oil on wood, 50,4 × 85 cm

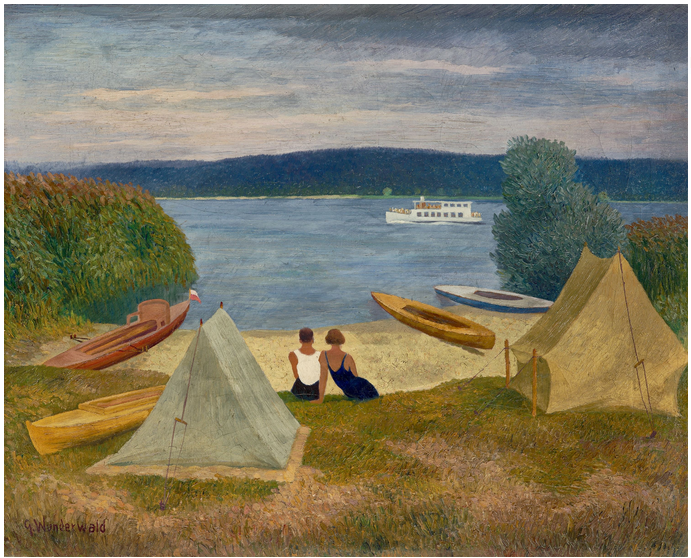
Wochenende am See, signed: "G. Wunderwald", 1930, oil on canvas, 52 × 64,5 cm

== Publications ==
- Wilhelm Schmidtbonn: The right to the name, in: Die Schaubühne, April 8, 1909.
- Oskar Maurus Fontana: Gustav Wunderwald, in: Der Merker, 1st year, No. 16, 1910.
- Paul Westheim: Gustav Wunderwald, in: Das Kunstblatt, 11 year, No. 1, 1927.
- Fritz Burger: Introduction to Modern Art, Potsdam 1928.
- Felix Dargel: Berlin without makeup, in: Depesche, July 25, 1950, No. 89th.
- Wilhelm Schmidtbonn: Gustav Wunderwald, in: Kurt Loup (ed.), Das festliche Haus. Das Düsseldorfer Schauspielhaus Dumont-Lindemann. Spiegel und Ausdruck der Zeit, Cologne / Bonn 1955.
- Elisabeth Erdmann-Macke: Memoir of August Macke, Stuttgart 1962.
- Wieland Schmied: Neue Sachlichkeit und Magischer Realismus in Deutschland 1918–1933, Hanover 1969.
- Wunderwald Calendar 1982, Texts: Hildegard Reinhardt and Eberhard Roters, Informationszentrum Berlin (ed.), Berlin 1981.
- Berlinische Galerie (ed.): Gustav Wunderwald. Gemälde, Handzeichnungen, Bühnenbilder. Eine Ausstellung zum 100. Geburtstag des Künstlers. Berlin 1982. (exhibition catalogue)
- Hildegard Reinhardt: Gustav Wunderwald (1882–1945). Untersuchung zum bildkünstlerischen Gesamtwerk. Olms Verlag, Hildesheim/Zürich/New York 1988, ISBN 3-487-09079-1. (Catalogue of Works)
- Berliner Bank AG (ed.), Gustav Wunderwald 1882–1945. Ausstellung Märkisches Museum und Museum Knoblauchhaus. Berlin 1992. (exhibition catalogue)
- Gustav Wunderwald’s Paintings of Weimar Berlin. Text: Mark Hobbs: In: The Public Domain Review, 31 May 2017.
- The City as a Stage: Gustav Wunderwald’s Berlin. Text: Mark Hobbs: In: slowtravelberlin, 29 October 2025.
