= Neues Museum Nürnberg =

Art and design museum in Nuremberg, Germany

Coordinates: 49°26′52″N 11°04′48″E

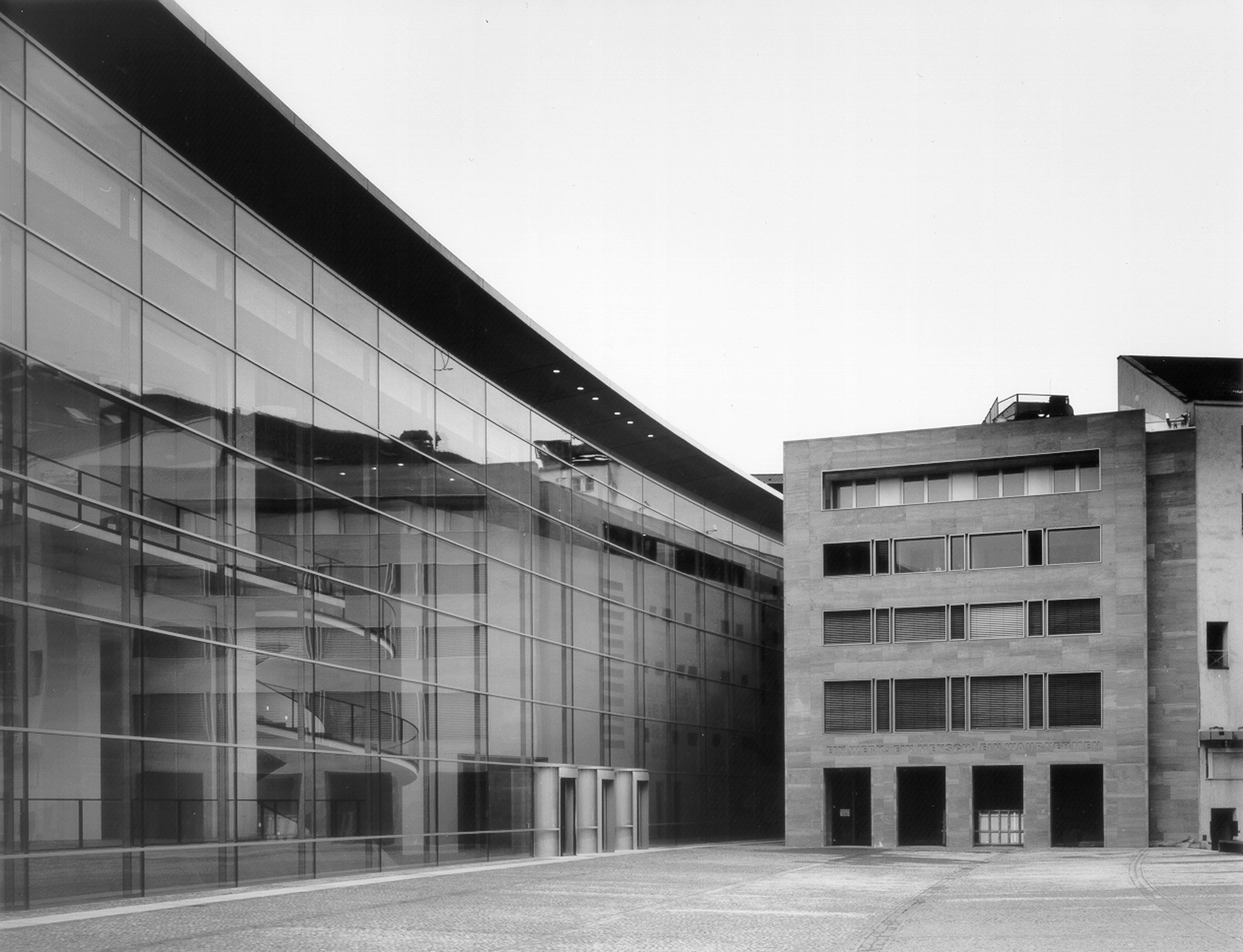
- Established: April 2000
- Location: Luitpoldstraße 5, 90402 Nuremberg, Germany
- Visitors: record of 60000 visitors in 2015 for the Gerhard Richter exhibition
- Director: Dr. Eva-Christina Kraus
- Public transit access: U1 (Nuremberg U-Bahn): Hauptbahnhof
- Website: http://www.nmn.de

Neues Museum Nürnberg (NMN) is a museum for modern and contemporary art and design in Nuremberg.

== Architecture ==
In 1990 the Bavarian government decided to build a 20th-century museum.

The building in which the museum is located was designed by the architect Volker Staab. Construction started on 11 September 1996 and ended in October 1999. The official opening was on 15. April 2000. On 3000 sq/m contemporary art as well as art and design dating back to the 1950s is being shown.

== Environmental Protection ==
Since March 2015, the NMN houses bees on its roof. City beekeeper Bernd J. Kobr currently looks after the bees. Their honey "Stadtgold" ("City Gold") can be bought in the museum shop.

== Directors ==
- Lucius Grisebach from 1 October 1997 to 31 August 2007
- Angelika Nollert from 1 October 2007 to 1 May 2014
- Eva-Christina Kraus from 1 September 2014 to 31 July 2020
- Simone Schimpf since 1 July 2021
