= Gunzenhauser Museum =

Museum in Germany

Coordinates: 50°49′43.6″N 12°54′55.82″E

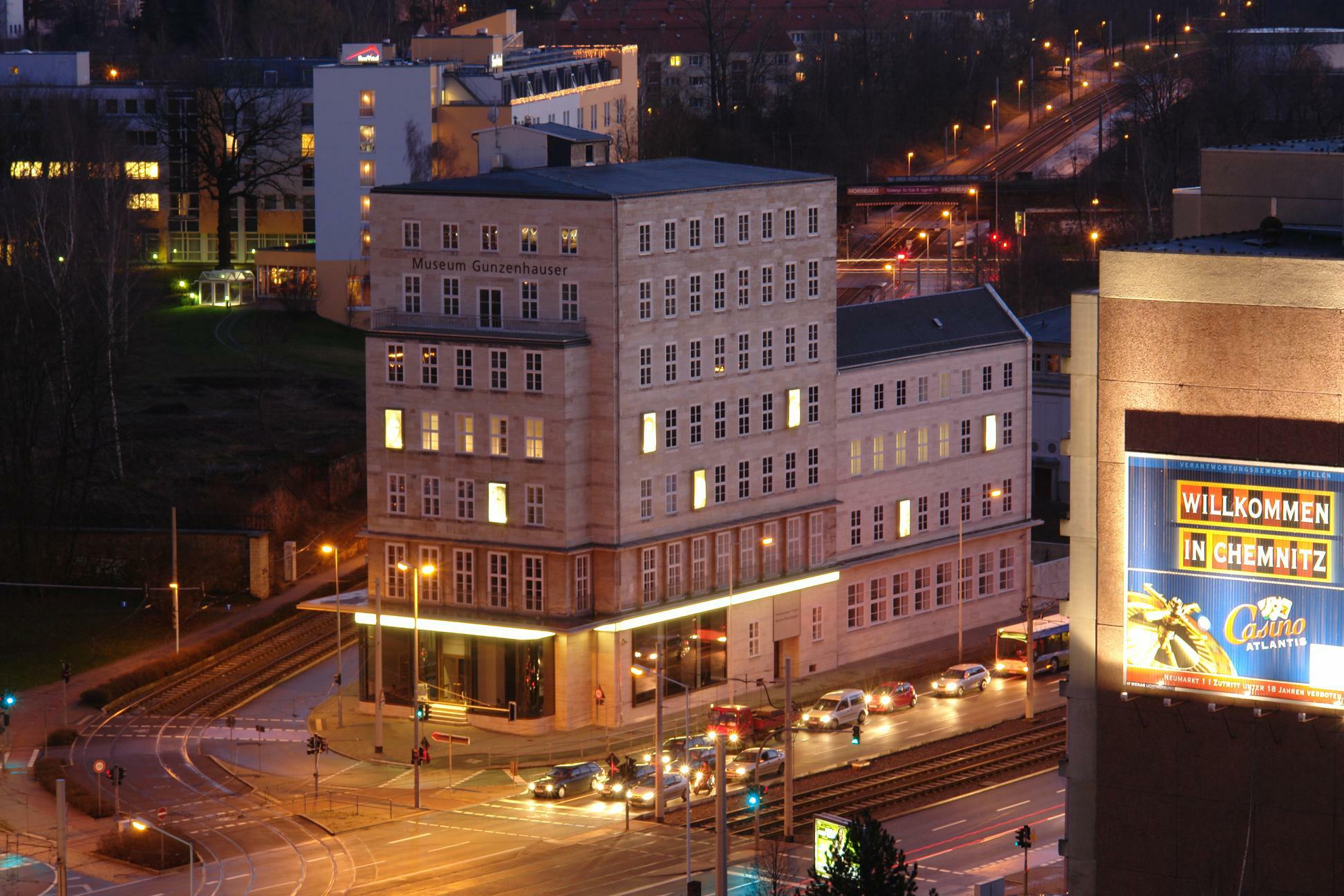
The museum's building

Gunzenhauser Museum, Chemnitz

The Gunzenhauser Museum (German: Museum Gunzenhauser) is a museum and art gallery located in Chemnitz, the third largest city of Saxony, Germany. It contains 2,459 works by 270 modern artists of the 20th century that have been collected by the art dealer Dr. Alfred Gunzenhauser. The Gunzenhauser Museum was inaugurated in December 2007 in the presence of German President Horst Köhler and is one of the most important museums of modern art in Germany.

== Building's history ==
The museum's building was constructed between 1928 and 1930 in the New Objectivity style as the former headquarters of the Sparkasse Chemnitz ("Savings and loan association of Chemnitz") and was one of the first high-rise buildings in Chemnitz. Fred Otto (1883–1944), head of the municipal planning and building control office between 1925 and 1944, purposely abandoned decorative elements and used bright, beige-coloured travertine for the facades. Thus, the building shows its balanced proportions and clear structure to good effect. The building's aesthetic centre is the former tills' hall, which is lighted by a glass roof. During the renovation, the architect Volker Staab took advantage of the existing building's potential and minimized the use of structural addition and interventions.

== Exposition ==
The collection's main component are numerous works of Expressionism. The exhibition consists of works by Ernst Ludwig Kirchner, Erich Heckel and Karl Schmidt-Rottluff. They attended school in Chemnitz and participated in the expressionist group Die Brücke. The museum also contains the second largest collection of works by Alexej von Jawlensky and Gabriele Münter, who were members of Der Blaue Reiter. There are works of several other artists like Christian Rohlfs, Paula Modersohn-Becker and Helmut Kolle. Furthermore, the museum has pictures of Max Beckmann drawn in the 1930s and 1940s. From the Weimar Republic period there are works by Karl Hubbuch, Franz Radziwill, Alexander Kanoldt, Georg Schrimpf and Gustav Wunderwald. 110 paintings originate from Conrad Felixmüller. The exhibition's centrepiece is the largest collection of 290 pieces by Otto Dix. The first self-portrait drawn with oil in 1912, early paintings from the period of the art college in Dresden (Dresdner Kunstgewerbeschule), important Aquarelles und Gouaches from the period of the First World War as well as considerable works of the 1920s and the late work. From the period after the Second World War many works originate from Willi Baumeister, Fritz Winter, Ernst Wilhelm Nay, Bernard Schultze and Emil Schumacher as well as from Karl Hofer, Johannes Grützke, Horst Antes, Klaus Fußmann, Karl Horst Hödicke and Rainer Fetting.

== See also ==
- List of museums in Saxony
