= Midori and Friends =

American organization for music education

Midori & Friends is a New York City–based non-profit organization that provides accessible musical education programs to children with little to-no-access to the arts. Founded by virtuoso violinist Midori Goto in 1992, the organization provides both concerts and instrumental instruction to students who would not otherwise have the benefit of music in their schools. Midori & Friends integrates New York State standards for music education, as well as the benchmarks and goals of the New York City Department of Education’s Blueprint for Teaching and Learning in the Arts.

== Programs ==
Depending on the needs and resources of the school involved, Midori & Friends provides a few different programs.

=== Play to Learn ===
Honed over almost three decades of implementation in public schools, Play to Learn provides instruction to students in grades K-12 in strings, percussion, winds, and chorus, both during and after school. Students showcase their accomplishments in culminating group performances for their families and school communities. While performances represent concrete goals for students to work toward and achieve, they also cultivate positive arts experiences for themselves, peers, parents, and friends.

=== Celebrate! Music ===
Celebrate! Music expands the musical horizons of students in grades K-12 by introducing them to different cultures and music genres through live performances and classroom workshops. Students experience both live artist performances and interactive workshops with teaching artists, deepening their understanding of a particular music tradition over the course of a celebratory four-session residency. By learning about the richness of cultural traditions, works of art, and musical customs around the globe—in class and through live performances—students cultivate a global perspective that nurtures empathy and understanding. Midori & Friends provides professional development for classroom teachers to help facilitate curriculum connections in the classroom and school community.

=== NEXTGen Musician ===
NEXTGen Teen Leaders is a two-year paid leadership development program for 10th and 11th grade musicians attending New York City public and charter high schools. Students have the opportunity to explore career pathways, in music and beyond, through workshops, masterclasses, performances, work-study opportunities, and career labs with critical thinkers in each field of study and extraordinary artists, including world-renowned virtuoso violinist, Midori! Alongside artistic development, teens develop skills in advocacy by telling the story of the importance of music education, speak with elected officials with confidence, and stay involved. The program culminates in the opportunity for each student to create an arts advocacy campaign and present it in the community.

== Quotes ==
"Midori & Friends has become a cornerstone of music instruction for students throughout New York City."

—The New York Times, April 23, 2006

"Amazing, exhilarating, and invigorating define our school's relationship with Midori & Friends. These adjectives speak to how this partnership has transformed the way the arts are integrated at our school. Our partnership has enabled our school to uplift children and their families through the richness of music."

—Dr. Peter McFarlane, Principal, P.S. 180M, Harlem

“Through its extraordinary dedication to nurturing our city’s young virtuosos, Midori & Friends helps this administration provide public school students with quality arts education. We are grateful for their efforts to help our children learn, grow, and achieve their dreams.”

– Michael R. Bloomberg
