= Midori (violinist) =

Japanese violinist (born 1971)

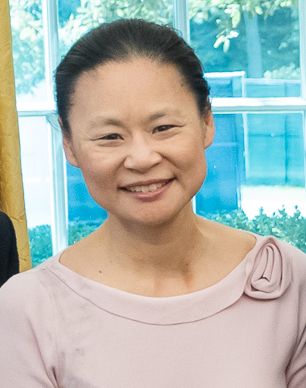
- Midori at the White House in 2021

Background information
- Also known as: Midori (formerly styled as Mi Dori)
- Born: Midori Goto; October 25, 1971 (age 55); Hirakata, Osaka, Japan
- Genre: Classical
- Occupation: Musician
- Instrument: 1731 Guarneri "ex-Huberman" violin
- Years active: 1982–present

Midori Goto (五嶋 みどり, Gotō Midori; born October 25, 1971), who performs under the mononym Midori, is a Japanese-born American violinist. She made her debut with the New York Philharmonic at age 11 as a surprise guest soloist at the New Year's Eve Gala in 1982. In 1986 her performance at the Tanglewood Music Festival with Leonard Bernstein conducting his own composition made the front-page headlines in The New York Times. Midori became a celebrated child prodigy, and one of the world's preeminent violinists as an adult.

Midori has been honored as an educator and for her community engagement endeavors. When she was 21, she established her foundation Midori and Friends to bring music education to young people in underserved communities in New York City and Japan, which has evolved into four distinct organizations with worldwide impact. In 2007, Midori was appointed as a UN Messenger of Peace. In 2018, she joined the violin faculty at the Curtis Institute of Music. She is also on the faculty of the University of Southern California's Thornton School of Music serving as Distinguished Professor and Judge Widney Professor of Music. She was elected to the American Academy of Arts and Sciences in 2012.

== Early life ==
Midori was born Midori Goto in Osaka, Japan, on October 25, 1971. She dropped her father's surname from her stage name after her parents’ divorce in 1983, initially performing under the name Mi Dori, then deciding on the single word Midori. Her father was a successful engineer and her mother, Setsu Gotō, was a professional violinist. Setsu regularly took young Midori to her orchestra rehearsals where the toddler slept in the front row of the auditorium while her mother rehearsed. One day Setsu heard a two-year-old Midori humming a Bach concerto that had been rehearsed two days earlier. Subsequently, Midori often tried to touch her mother's violin, even climbing onto the bench of the family piano to try to reach the violin on top of the piano. On Midori's third birthday, Setsu gave her a 1/16-size violin and began giving her lessons.

== Career ==
Midori gave her first public performance at the age of six, playing one of the 24 Caprices of Paganini in her native Osaka. In 1982 she and her mother moved to New York City, where Midori started violin studies with Dorothy DeLay at Pre-College Division of Juilliard School and the Aspen Music Festival and School. As her audition piece, Midori performed Bach's thirteen-minute-long Chaconne, generally considered one of the most difficult solo violin pieces. In the same year, she made her concert debut with the New York Philharmonic under Zubin Mehta, a conductor with whom she would later record on the Sony Classical label. In 1986 came her legendary performance of Leonard Bernstein's Serenade at Tanglewood, conducted by Bernstein. During the performance, she broke the E string on her violin, then again on the concertmaster's Stradivarius after she borrowed it. She finished the performance with the associate concertmaster's Guadagnini and received a standing ovation. The next day's The New York Times front page carried the headline, "Girl, 14, Conquers Tanglewood with 3 Violins".

When Midori was 15, she left Juilliard Pre-College in 1987 after four years and became a full-time professional violinist. In October 1989, she celebrated her 18th birthday with her Carnegie Hall orchestral debut, playing Bartok's Violin Concerto No. 2. She made her Carnegie Hall recital debut in 1990 four days before her 19th birthday. Both performances were critically acclaimed. In 1990, she also graduated from the Professional Children's School which she attended for academic subjects.

As an international soloist, Midori has appeared with orchestras including the New York Philharmonic, London Symphony Orchestra, Chicago Symphony Orchestra, San Francisco Symphony, Bavarian Radio Symphony Orchestra, Berlin Philharmonic, Vienna Philharmonic, Mahler Chamber Orchestra, Sofia Philharmonic Orchestra and Boston Symphony Orchestra. Conductors with whom she has worked include Zubin Mehta, Leonard Bernstein, Claudio Abbado, Christoph Eschenbach, Paavo Järvi, Mariss Jansons, Daniel Harding, Susanna Mälkki, Joana Mallwitz, Andris Nelsons, Kent Nagano and Nayden Todorov.

In 1992, after learning of severe cutbacks to music education in U.S. schools, she formed Midori and Friends, a non-profit organization that aims to bring music education to children in New York City and in Japan. Her organization Music Sharing began as the Tokyo branch-office of Midori and Friends and was certified as an independent organization in 2002. Music Sharing focuses on education about Western classical music and traditional Japanese music for young people, including instrument instruction for the disabled. Its International Community Engagement Program is a training program for internationally chosen aspiring musicians that promotes cultural exchange and community engagement.

In 2000, Midori graduated magna cum laude from the Gallatin School at New York University with a bachelor's degree in Psychology and Gender Studies, completing the degree in five years while also continuing to perform in concerts. She later earned a master's degree in psychology from NYU in 2005. Her master's thesis was about pain research. In 2001, Midori had returned to the stage and took a teaching position at the Manhattan School of Music. In 2001, with the money Midori received from winning the Avery Fisher Prize, she established the Partners in Performance program focusing on classical music organizations in smaller communities. In 2004, Midori launched the Orchestra Residencies program in the U.S. for youth orchestras, which was expanded to include collaborations with orchestras outside the U.S. in 2010.

In 2004, Midori was named a professor at University of Southern California's Thornton School of Music where she is holder of the Jascha Heifetz Chair. She became a full-time resident of Los Angeles in 2006 after a period of bicoastal commuting and was promoted to the chair of the Strings Department in 2007. In 2012 she was named distinguished professor at USC, elected to the American Academy of Arts & Sciences, and was awarded an honorary doctorate in music by Yale University. Midori was Humanitas Visiting professor in Classical Music and Music Education at Oxford University 2013–2014. Midori joined the violin faculty of Philadelphia's Curtis Institute in the 2018–2019 academic year and remains on the University of Southern California Thornton School of Music's violin faculty as a Judge Widney Professor of Music. She is currently the artistic director of the Piano & Strings program at Ravinia's Steans Institute.

== Accolades ==
In addition to being named Artist of the Year by the Japanese government (1988) and the recipient of the 25th Suntory Music Award (1993), Midori has won the Avery Fisher Prize (2001), Musical America’s Instrumentalist of the Year award (2002), the Deutscher Schallplattenpreis (2002, 2003), the Kennedy Center Gold Medal in the Arts (2010) and the Mellon Mentoring Award (2012). In 2007, Midori was named a United Nations Messenger of Peace. In 2012, she received the prestigious Crystal Award by the World Economic Forum in Davos for "20-year devotion to community engagement work worldwide". In May 2021, she was an honoree of the 43rd Kennedy Center Honors. In May 2022, Midori was awarded the John D. Rockefeller III Award by the Asian Cultural Council alongside artist Cai Guo-Qiang. The John D. Rockefeller 3rd Award is given to individuals from Asia or the U.S. who have made significant contributions to the international understanding, practice or study of the visual or performing arts of Asia.

== Personal life ==
In September 1994, Midori suddenly canceled her concerts and withdrew from public view. She was hospitalized and given an official diagnosis of anorexia for the first time. In her twenties, Midori struggled with anorexia and depression, resulting in a number of hospital stays. She later wrote about these personal difficulties in her 2004 memoir Einfach Midori ('Simply Midori'), which has been published in German but not English. (It was updated and reissued in German-speaking countries in 2012.) After recovering, she continued to perform and also studied psychology and gender studies at New York University. For a while, she considered psychology as an alternative career, with a focus on working with children.

Midori's half-brother Ryu and her stepfather Makoto Kaneshiro (Ryu's father, a former violin assistant of Dorothy DeLay) are both violinists.

Midori is a 2019 Honoree of the Great Immigrants Award by the Carnegie Corporation of New York.

== Instrument ==
Midori plays on the 1731 Guarneri "ex-Huberman" violin. Her bows are made by Dominique Peccatte (two) and François Peccatte (one).

== Discography ==
- Bach/Vivaldi: Double Violin Concertos (Philips Records, 1986) – with Pinchas Zukerman (violin, conductor), St. Paul Chamber Orchestra. Bach's Concerto for Two Violins in D minor and Violin Concerto No. 2 in E major; Vivaldi's 12 Concertos, Op.3 – "L'estro armonico" / Concerto No. 8 In A Minor For 2 Violins
- Paganini: 24 Caprices for Solo Violin, Op.1 (CBS Masterworks Records, 1989)
- Dvořák: Violin Concerto, Romance and Carnival Overture (Sony Classical, 1989) – with New York Philharmonic Orchestra, Zubin Mehta (conductor). Concerto for Violin and Orchestra in A minor, Op. 53; Romance in F minor for Violin and Orchestra, Op. 11; and Carnival Overture, Op 92.
- Bartok – Violin Concertos No.1 & No.2 (Sony Classical, 1991) – with Berlin Philharmonic Orchestra, Zubin Mehta (conductor)
- Midori: Live At Carnegie Hall (Sony Classical, 1991) – with Robert McDonald (piano)
- Encore! (Sony Classical, 1992) – with Robert McDonald (piano)
- Sibelius: Violin Concerto / Bruch: Scottish Fantasy (Sony Classical, 1994) – with Israel Philharmonic Orchestra, Zubin Mehta (conductor). Sibelius's Concerto for Violin and Orchestra in D minor, Op. 47, and Bruch's Scottish Fantasy, Op. 46
- Tchaikovsky & Shostakovich: Violin Concertos (Sony Classical, 1994) – with Berlin Philharmonic Orchestra, Claudio Abbado (conductor); Tchaikovsky's Concerto for Violin and Orchestra in D Major and Shostakovich's Concerto for Violin and Orchestra No.1 in A minor
- Franck: Elgar: Violin Sonata in E minor, Op. 82, Violin Sonata in A Major (Sony Classical, 1997) – with Robert McDonald (piano)
- Mozart: Sinfonia Concertante in E-Flat Major & Concerto in D Major (Sony Classical, 2001) – with Nobuko Imai (viola), Christoph Eschenbach (conductor and piano), NDR Symphony Orchestra
- Debussy, Poulenc & Saint-Saëns: Violin Sonatas (Sony Classical, 2002) – with Robert McDonald (piano). Poulenc's Sonata for Violin and Piano, Debussy's Sonata in G Minor for Violin and Piano, and Saint-Saëns's Sonata No.1 in D minor for Violin and Piano, Op. 75
- Midori – 20th Anniversary Album (Sony Classical, 2002) – with Leonard Slatkin (conductor), Saint Louis Symphony Orchestra, Robert McDonald (piano)
- Mendelssohn & Bruch Violin Concertos (Sony Classical, 2002) – with Berlin Philharmonic Orchestra, Mariss Jansons (conductor). Mendelssohn's Concerto for Violin and Orchestra in E minor, Op. 64 and Bruch's Concerto No.1 for Violin and Orchestra in G Minor, Op. 26
- Bach Sonata No. 2 in A minor, Bartók: Sonata No. 1 (Sony Classical, 2008) – with Robert McDonald (piano)
- The Essential Midori (Sony Classical, 2008)
- Violin Sonatas of Bloch, Janáček and Shostakovich (Sony Classical, 2013) – with Ozgür Aydin (piano)
- Hindemith: Violin Concerto; Symphonic Metamorphosis; Konzertmusik (Ondine, 2013) – with NDR Symphony Orchestra, Christoph Eschenbach (conductor)
- Bach: Sonatas & Partitas for Solo Violin (Onyx Classics, 2015)
- Beethoven: Violin Concerto & Romances Nos. 1 & 2 (Warner Classics, 2020) – with Daniel Dodds (violin), Festival Strings Lucerne

== Films ==
- 2003: ... and on and on! The violinist Midori (Director: Holger Preuße, ZDF/ARTE)
- 2017: Sonatas and Partitas for Solo Violin, BWV 1001–1006 (Midori Plays Bach) (Production: Accentus Music, Co-Production: NHK, In cooperation with: MDR/Arte, Bachfesttage Köthen, Director: Andreas Morell)
