= Volker Staab =

German architect

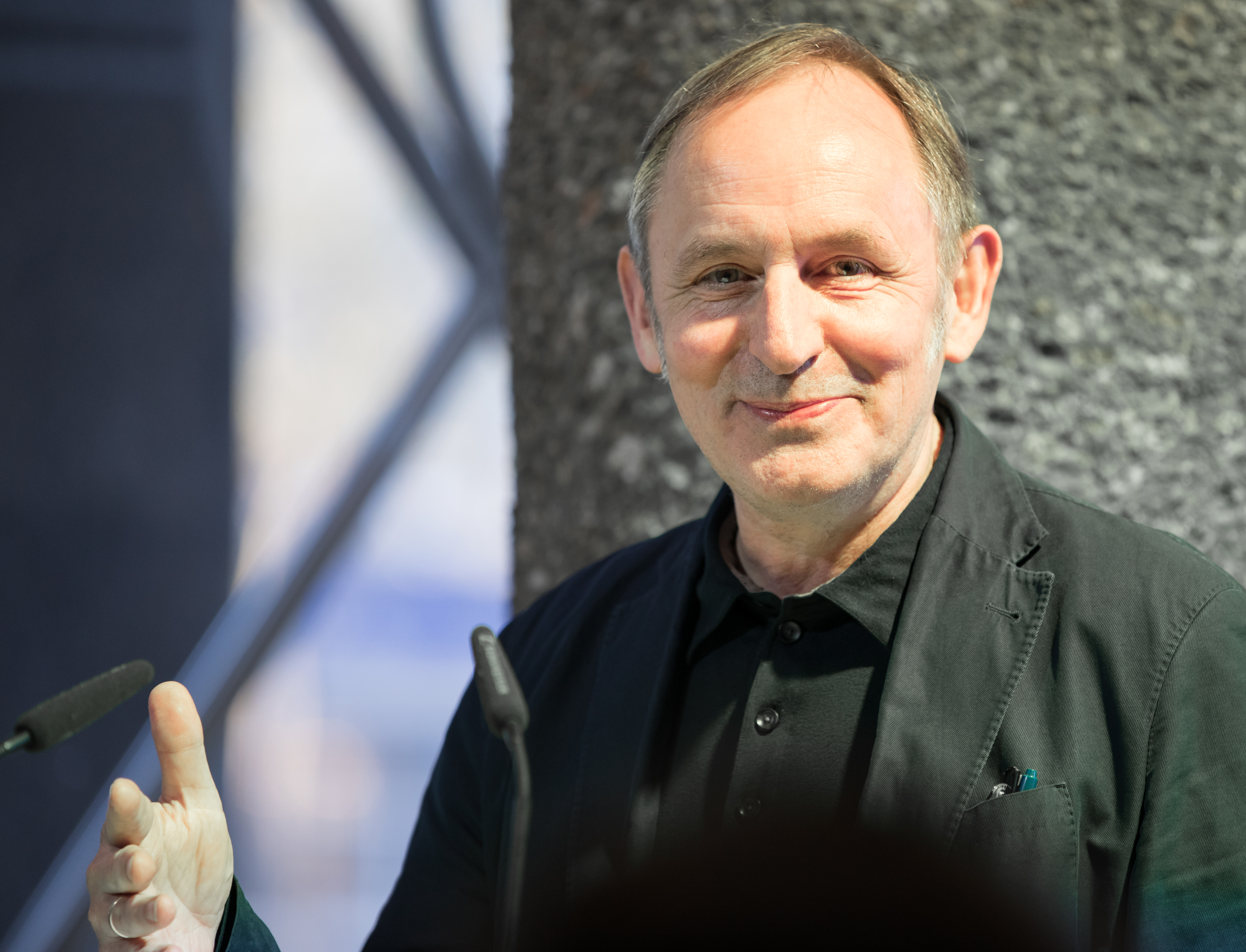
Volker Staab, 2018

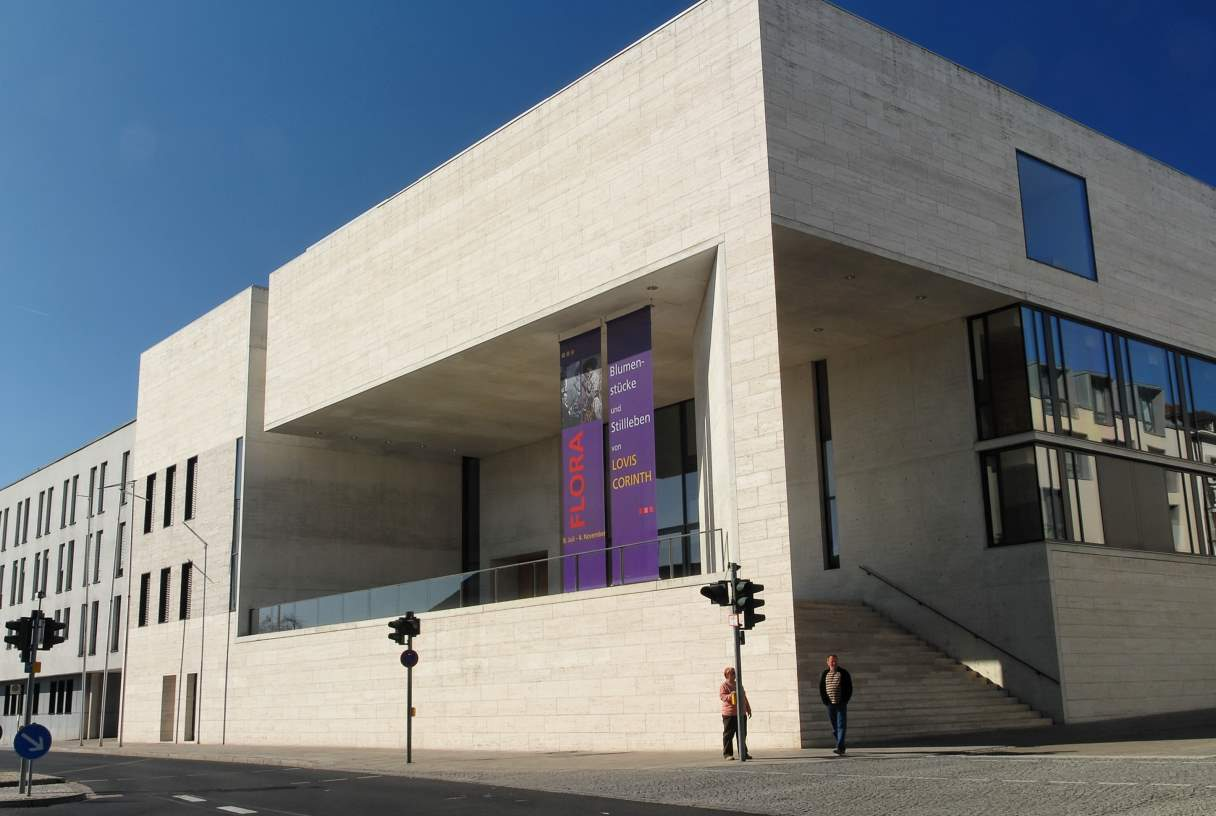
Museum Georg Schäfer, Schweinfurt

Volker Staab (born 25 December 1957) is a German architect.

== Life ==
Born in Heidelberg, Staab studied architecture from 1977 bis 1983 at the ETH Zürich (Diploma Architect ETH). From 1985 to 1990, he worked as a freelancer for the office of Dietrich Bangert, Bernd Jansen, Stefan Scholz and Axel Schultes in Berlin. In the same year, he collaborated on the design for the Kunstmuseum Bonn.

He has been a freelance architect since 1990. In 1991 he founded the architectural practice Volker Staab. Since 1996 he has worked in partnership with Alfred Nieuwenhuizen under Staab Architekten, since 2007 as Staab Architekten GmbH.

In 2002–2004 Staab took on a visiting scholar position at the Technische Universität Berlin. In 2002, he also received a lectureship at the Academy of Fine Arts, Nuremberg. In 2005, he became a visiting professor at the FH Münster and taught there until 2007. From 2008 to 2009, Staab held the deputy chair of architecture/public spaces and buildings at the Staatliche Akademie der Bildenden Künste Stuttgart. Since 2012 he has held the professorship for design and spatial composition at the TU Braunschweig.

=== Memberships ===
Staab is a member of the Bund Deutscher Architekten (since 1997), a member of the Academy of Arts, Berlin (since 2005) und des Beirats der Bundesstiftung Baukultur in Potsdam (since 2007). Since 2013 he has been a member of the board of trustees of the IBA Heidelberg and since 2014 a member of the Berlin State Monuments Council.

== Buildings ==
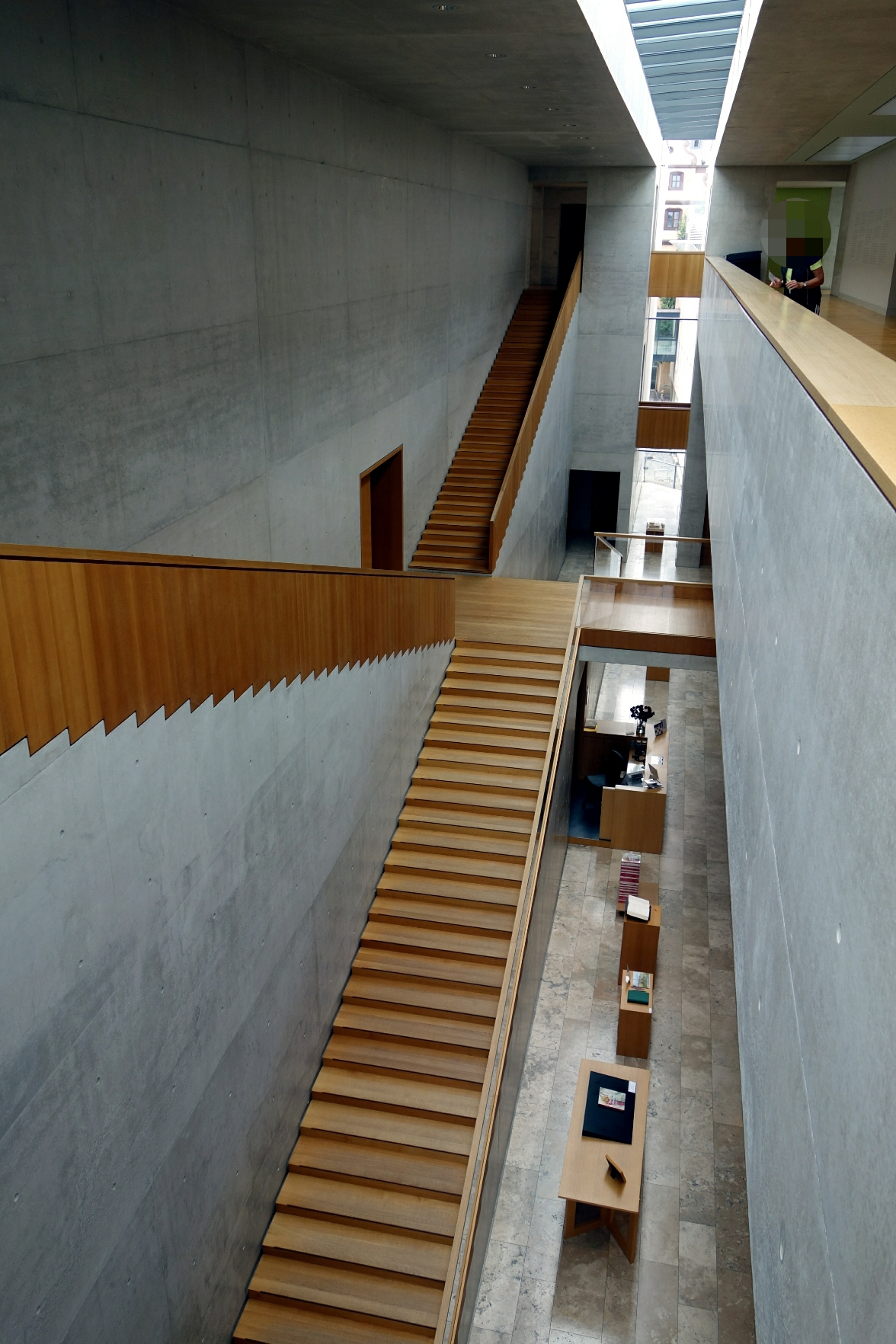
Treppenhaus, Museum Georg Schäfer

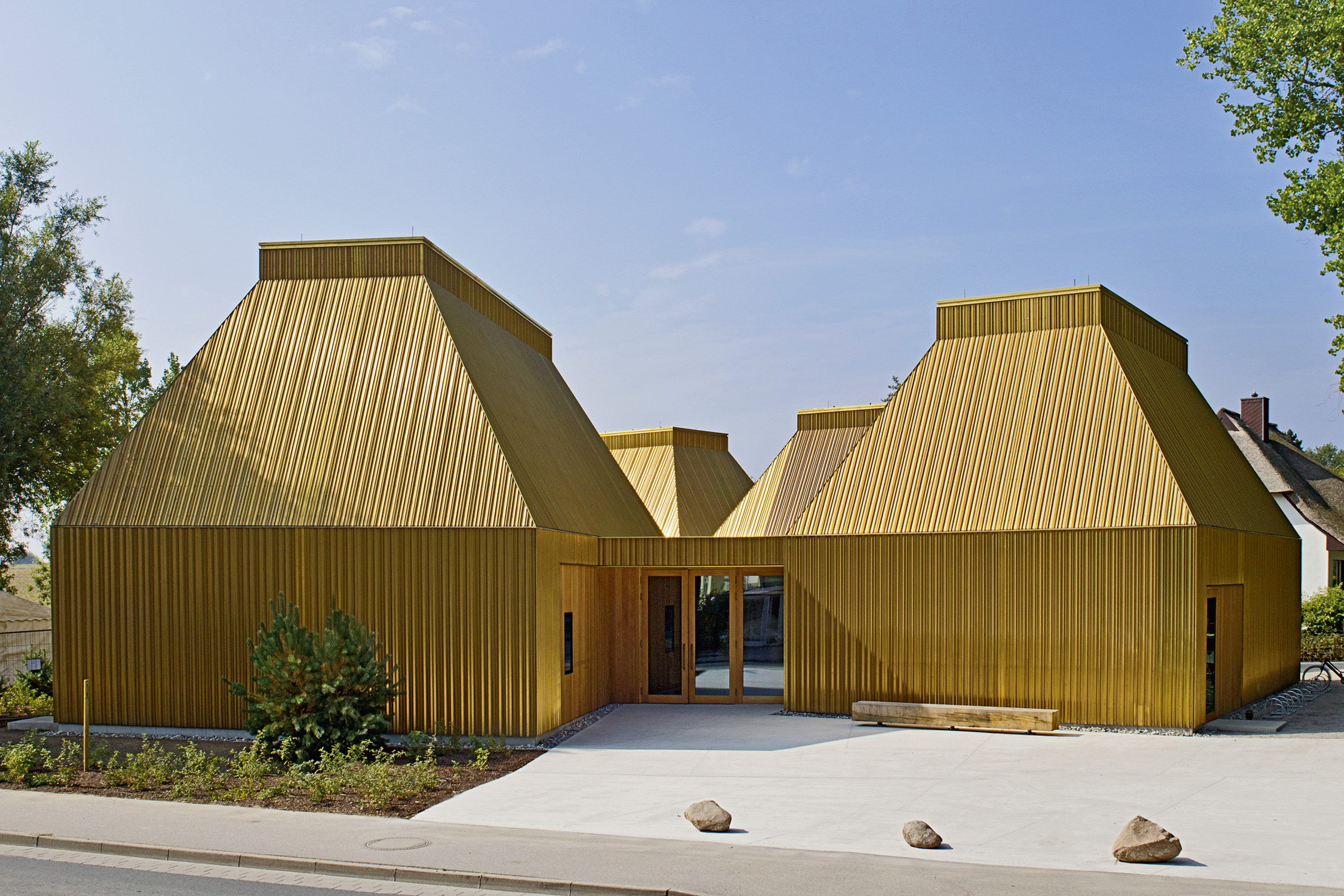
Kunstmuseum, Ahrenshoop

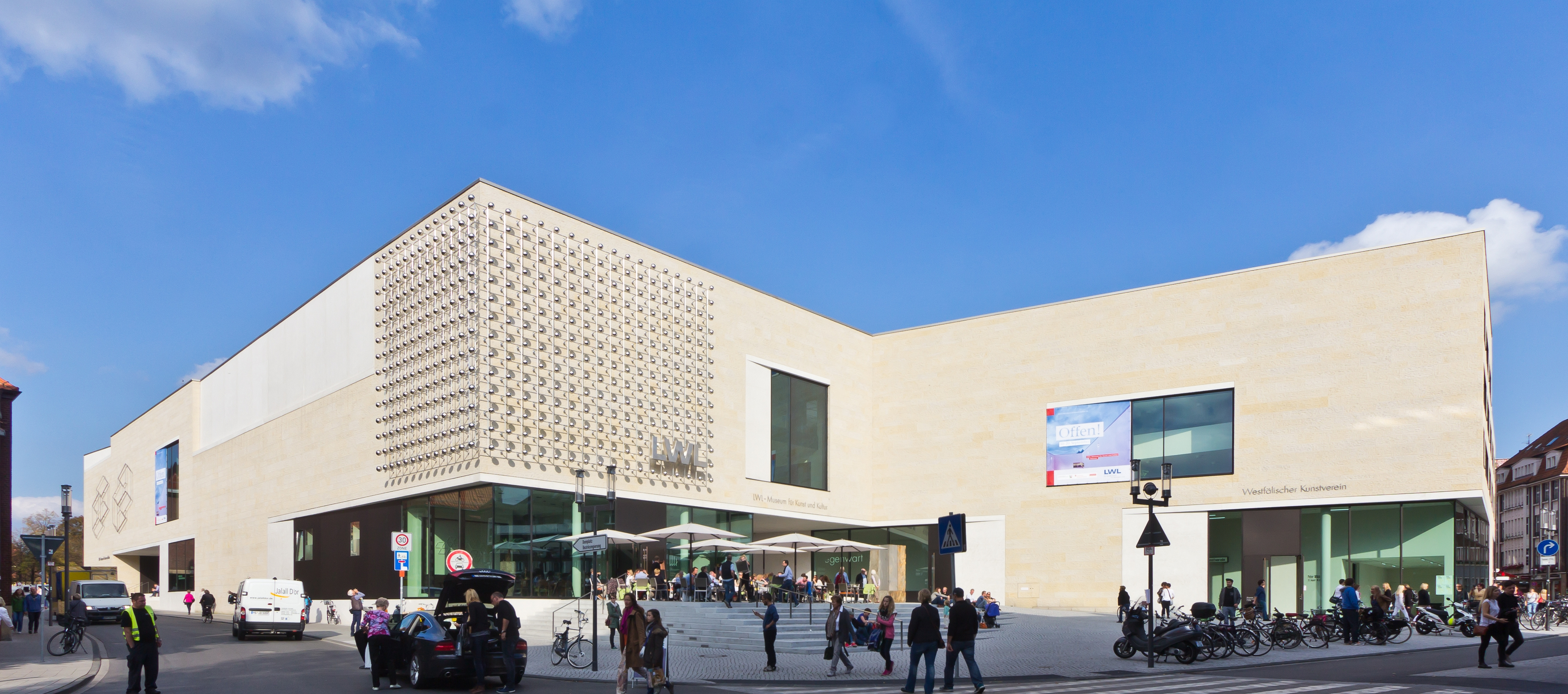
LWL-Museum für Kunst und Kultur Münster

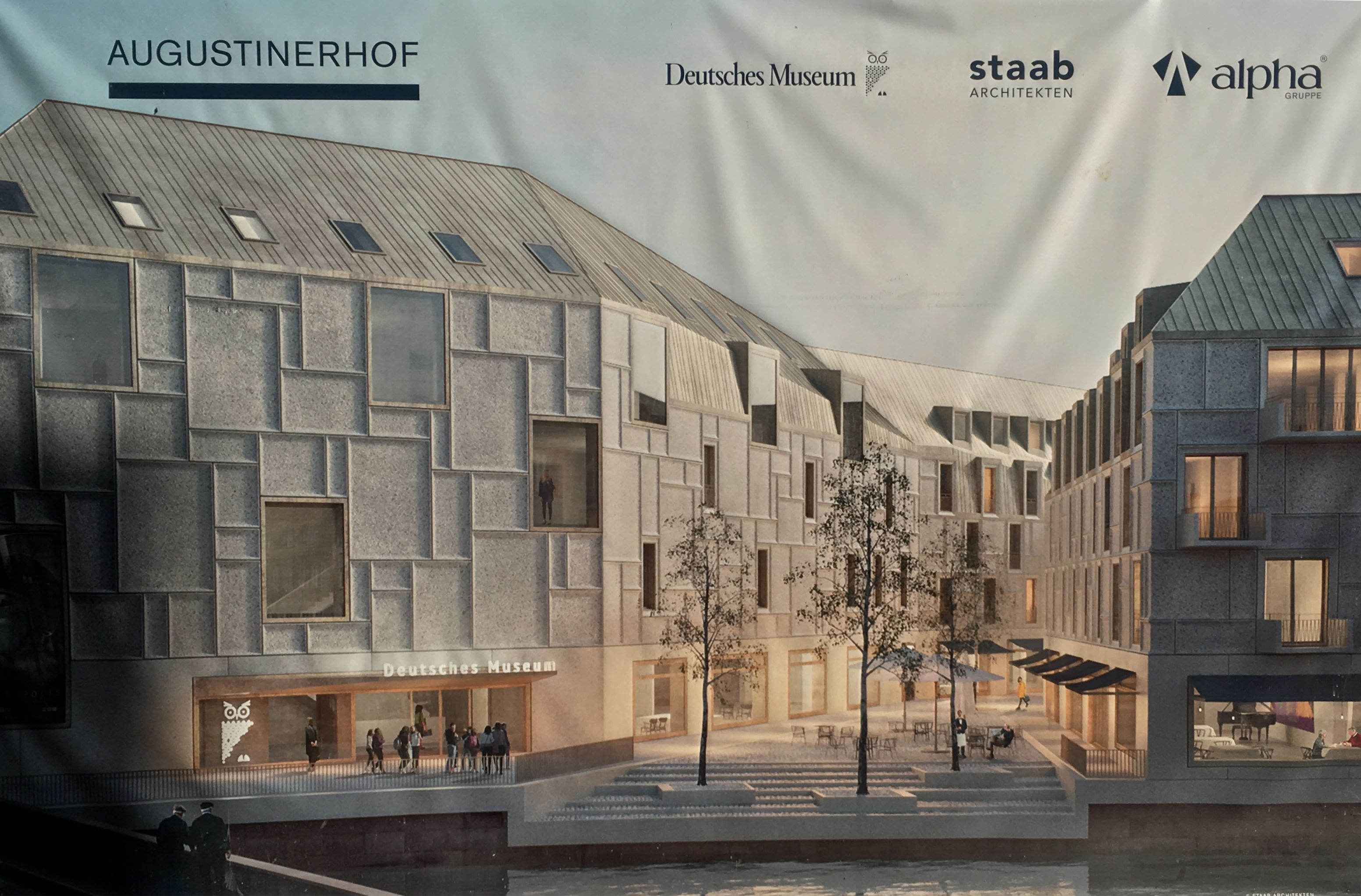
Visualisierung des Augustinerhof

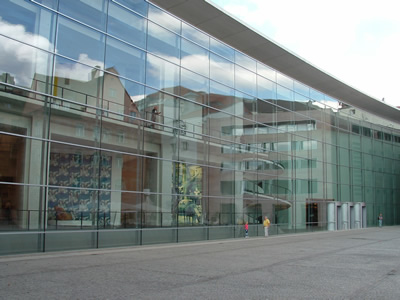
Neues Museum, Nürnberg

- 1992–1994: Extension of the Maximilianeum, Munich
- 1992–1999: Neues Museum Nürnberg
- 1997–2000: Museum Georg Schäfer, Schweinfurt
- 2002–2004: Service Centre at the Theresienwiese, Munich
- 2000–2005: Maximilianeum, redesign of the plenary hall of the Bavarian State Parliament, Munich
- 2002–2006: German Embassy Mexico, Chancery Building, Mexico City
- 2002–2007: University of Heidelberg – New building Bioquant
- 2004–2007: Museum Gunzenhauser, Chemnitz
- 2004–2010: Albertinum Dresden, Sanierung und Neubau Zentraldepot
- 2008–2010: Erweiterung des Textilverlag's NYA Nordiska, Dannenberg
- 2004–2011: University of Potsdam, Informations-, Kommunikations- und Medienzentrum Golm.
- 2005–2011: New Gallery, Kassel
- 2006–2011: Bergpark Wilhelmshöhe, Besucherzentrum Bad Wilhelmshöhe
- 2009–2011: Museum of the Bavarian Kings, Hohenschwangau
- 2010–2012: Nano-Bioanalytics Centre NBZ, Münster
- 2005–2013: Westphalian State Museum of Art and Cultural History, Münster.
- 2008–2013: Kunstmuseum Ahrenshoop.
- 2008–2013: Ministry of the Interior of the State of Baden-Württemberg, Stuttgart
- 2010–2015: Conversion and extension of the Richard-Wagner-Museum
- 2013–2016: General renovation and conversion of the House of the Landtage, Stuttgart
- since 2016: Erweiterungsbau Bauhaus Archive
- 2009–2017: Wissenschafts- und Restaurierungszentrum, Potsdam
- since 2017: Residential complex, Landsberg am Lech (Civil engineer: Michael Heubl).
- 2018: Sanierung und Erweiterung Zeughaus München zur Fakultät für Design der Hochschule München University of Applied Sciences.
- 2013–2019: Berlin Institute for Medical Systems Biology
- 2013–2014: Willy-Brandt-Schule (Warsaw), Deutsch-Polnische Deutsche Auslandsschule
- 2015–2019: Jüdisches Gemeindezentrum mit Synagoge Regensburg.
- 2008–2020: Augustinerhof, Nürnberg
- 2013–2020: Rehabilitation and expansion of the Jewish Museum Frankfurt.
- 2020: Protestant Centre, Augsburg.

== Prizes ==
- 1995: BDA-Preis Bayern for expansion of the Bavarian Parliament, Munich
- 2000: Preis für Stadtbildpflege der Stadt München for expansion of the Bavarian Parliament
- Architekturpreis Beton (2001; 2014) for Museum Georg Schäfer, Schweinfurt, and Visitor Centre at the Herkules, Kassel
- 2001: Deutscher Natursteinpreis for New Museum Nuremberg
- 2001: Special recognition of the Deutscher Städtebaupreis for New Museum Nuremberg
- 2005: Deutscher Fassadenpreis für vorgehängte hinterlüftete Fassaden for Servicezentrum, Theresienwiese München
- 2005: Deutscher Architekturpreis, Award, for Service Centre on the Theresienwiese, Munich
- 2009: Hugo-Häring-Preis of the BDA Baden-Württemberg for Heidelberg University, new building Bioquant
- 2010: Architekturpreis 2010 of the BDA Saxony for Museum Gunzenhauser, Chemnitz
- 2011: Deutscher Architekturpreis for Albertinum Dresden, Redevelopment and new construction of depository
- 2011: Großer BDA Preis
- 2012: BDA-Preis Niedersachsen for NYA Nordiska, Dannenberg
- 2012: Niedersächsischer Staatspreis für Architektur for Erweiterung des Firmensitzes von Nya Nordiska, Dannenberg
- 2013: Nike in der Kategorie Fügung for NYA Nordiska, Dannenberg
- 2013: Deutscher Fassadenpreis für vorgehängte hinterlüftete Fassaden for H da-Hochhaus der Hochschule Darmstadt
- 2013: BDA-Preis Bayern, Perfection of detail category, for Museum of the Bavarian Kings, Hohenschwangau
- 2014: Landesbaupreis Mecklenburg-Vorpommern for the Kunstmuseum Ahrenshoop
- 2014: Deutscher Hochschulbaupreis für Informations-, Kommunikations- und Medienzentrum der Universität Potsdam
- 2017: Deutscher Architekturpreis, Auszeichnung, for Generalsanierung Haus des Landtags, Stuttgart
- 2017: Bayerischer Staatspreis Bauen im Bestand for Richard Wagner Museum, Bayreuth
- 2018: Deutscher Städtebaupreis, Auszeichnung, for LWL-Museum für Kunst und Kultur, Münster
- 2018: Hugo-Häring-Landespreis des BDA Baden-Württemberg für Haus des Landtags, Stuttgart.
- 2018: Bundespreis Europäische Stadt, 3. Preis, für Jüdisches Gemeindezentrum mit Synagoge, Regensburg
- 2019: Architekturpreis Regensburg, Jüdisches Gemeindezentrum mit Synagoge, Regensburg
- 2019: Deutscher Architekturpreis, award for Science and Restoration Centre, Potsdam
