= 2022 International Jean Sibelius Violin Competition =

The Twelfth International Jean Sibelius Violin Competition took place in Helsinki from 18 to 29 May 2022. It was won by South Korean violinist In Mo Yang.

== Competition ==
The competition was originally scheduled for late 2020 but was postponed until 2022 due to the COVID-19 pandemic. To compensate for this change, violinists born in or after 1990 were still allowed to compete. 204 violinists applied for the competition and 39 ended up participating.

=== Prizes ===
In Mo Yang was declared the winner of the competition and was awarded 30,000 euros, a mentoring prize with Pekka Kuusisto and Sakari Oramo, a product prize from Genelec, and was loaned a 1772 Giovanni Battista Guadagnini violin. He additionally won 2,000 euros by the Sibelius family for the best performance of Magnus Lindberg's "Caprice." Nathan Meltzer was awarded second prize along with 20,000 euros and a product prize from Genelec. Dmytro Udovychenko was awarded third prize and 15,000 euros. The three other finalists were awarded 3,000 euros, and all violinists who advanced to the semi-final round were awarded 1,000 euros.

=== Schedule ===
Dates	Round	Venue
Thursday, 19 May - Saturday, 21 May	First	Sibelius Academy concert hall
Monday, 23 May - Wednesday, 25 May	Second	Sibelius Academy concert hall
Friday, 29 May - Sunday, 31 May	Final	Helsinki Music Centre

== Jurors ==
- (Finland) Sakari Oramo (chairman)
- (Finland) Jaakko Ilves
- (United States) Ilya Kaler
- (United States) Ida Kavafian
- (Norway) Henning Kraggerud
- (Canada) Lucie Robert
- (United Kingdom) Daniel Rowland
- (Finland) Elina Vähälä
- (South Korea) Nam Yun Kim (cancelled participation)
- (China) Tong Weidong (cancelled participation)

== Results ==
Contestant	R1	SF	F
(South Korea) In Mo Yang			Gold medal
(United States) Nathan Meltzer			Silver medal
(Ukraine) Dmytro Udovychenko			Bronze medal
(Armenia) Diana Adamyan			
(United States) Yesong Sophie Lee			
(Ukraine) Georgii Moroz			
(United States) Karisa Chiu			
(South Korea) SongHa Choi			
(Netherlands) Hawijch Elders			
(South Korea) Anna Im			
(Switzerland) (Austria) Amia Janicki			
(Canada) Daniel Kogan			
(South Korea) Fumika Mohri			
(Japan) Aoi Saito			
(Germany) Felicitas Schiffner			
(Finland) Kasmir Uusitupa			
(China) Qingzhu Weng			
(Japan) Minami Yoshida			
(Finland) Otto Antikainen			
(Japan) Rio Arai			
(Germany) Lara Boschkor			
(United States) Zach Brandon			
(South Korea) Jung Min Choi			
(Germany) (Italy) Mira Marie Foron			
(Japan) Risa Hokamura			
(Spain) (Finland) Adrián Ibáñez-Resjan			
(France) Sarah Jégou-Sageman			
(South Korea) Eun Che Kim			
(South Korea) Gyehee Kim			
(South Korea) Jeewon Kim			
(United States) Stephen Kim			
(South Korea) Miyeon Lee			
(Japan) Maine Nishiyama			
(Italy) Vikram Francesco Sedona			
(South Korea) Yoomin Seo			
(United States) Karen Su			
(Japan) Natsumi Tsuboi			
(South Korea) Jaewon Wee			
(China) Oukalin Yin			
