= Liana Isakadze =

Georgian violinist (1946–2024)

Liana Isakadze ლიანა ისაკაძე
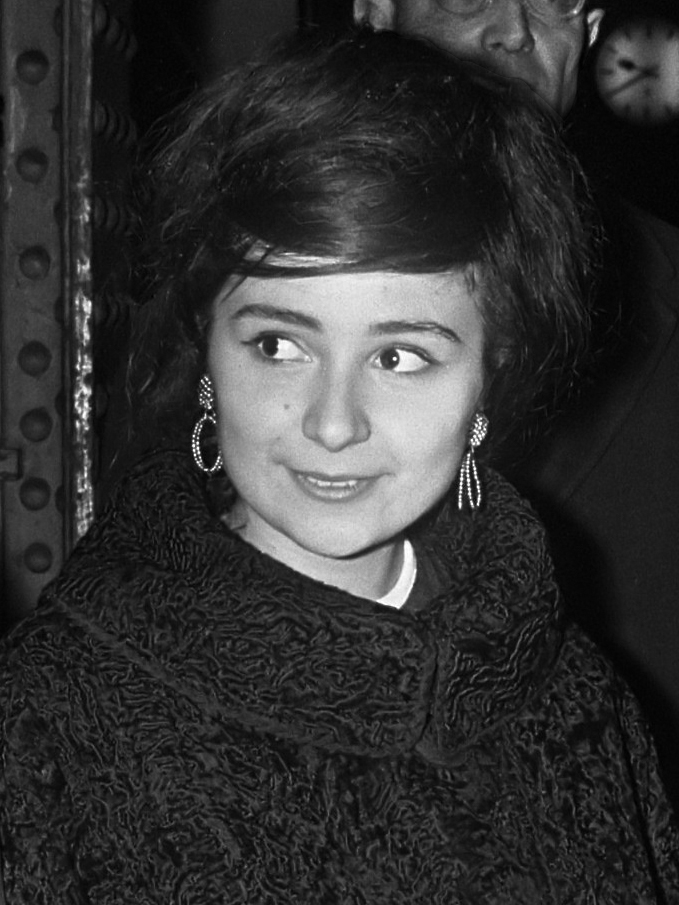
- Isakadze in 1967

Background information
- Born: 2 August 1946; Tbilisi, Georgian SSR, Soviet Union
- Died: 5 July 2024 (aged 77) Tbilisi, Georgia
- Genres: Classical
- Occupations: Violin; conductor
- Instrument: Violin
- Formerly of: Chamber Orchestra of Georgia
- Awards: Shota Rustaveli Prize (1983); People's Artist of the USSR (1988)

Liana Alexandres asuli Isakadze (Note: Georgian: ლიანა ალექსანდრეს ასული ისაკაძე, romanized: Liana Aleksandres asuli Isak’adze; Russian: Лиана Александровна Исакадзе, romanized: Liana Aleksandrovna Isakadze; romanized in German as Liana Alexandrowna Issakadse; German: Liana Issakadse) (2 August 1946 – 5 July 2024) was a Georgian violinist and conductor. A child prodigy, she was supported and trained by David Oistrakh. She won the 1970 International Jean Sibelius Violin Competition, which brought her international recognition. Following a career as a violin soloist with leading orchestras throughout Europe, she served as conductor of the Chamber Orchestra of Georgia from 1981. In 1988 she was recognized awarded the title People's Artist of the USSR, then the youngest musician in the history of the Soviet Union to obtain that title. She moved with the chamber orchestra to Ingolstadt, Germany, in 1990, where over five years she conducted them in performances and recordings, playing as a soloist. She founded and directed there the David Oistrakh Academy of String Instruments.

== Life and career ==
Born in Tbilisi on 2 August 1946, the capital of then-Soviet Georgia, Isakadze entered music school at the age of seven. Taught by Leo Shiukashvili, she excelled and played with the State Symphonic Orchestra at age nine. In 1956 she played her first solo violin recital. In 1956 she took part in the Moscow International Festival Competition. While too young to compete, she performed the full program. The chairman of the festival, David Oistrakh, insisted that she graduate from the Central Musical School a year early because she had been accepted in his class at the Moscow State Conservatory without having to take the entrance exam.

After her studies Isakadze worked as Oistrakh's assistant for two years and simultaneously studied in his master class. She played in his orchestra when he conducted the violin concertos by Beethoven and Tchaikovsky.

From 1964 to 1981 she played a Stradivarius violin which was a gift from the State Violin Collection in Moscow. In 1965 she was awarded the Grand Prix at the Long-Thibaud-Crespin Competition in Paris. In 1970 she participated at the Tchaikovsky Competition in Moscow and achieved third place. In 1970 she took part in the second International Jean Sibelius Violin Competition in Helsinki where she shared the first prize with Pavel Kogan, which resulted in international recognition. She was awarded a special prize for performing the Violin Concerto by Sibelius there.

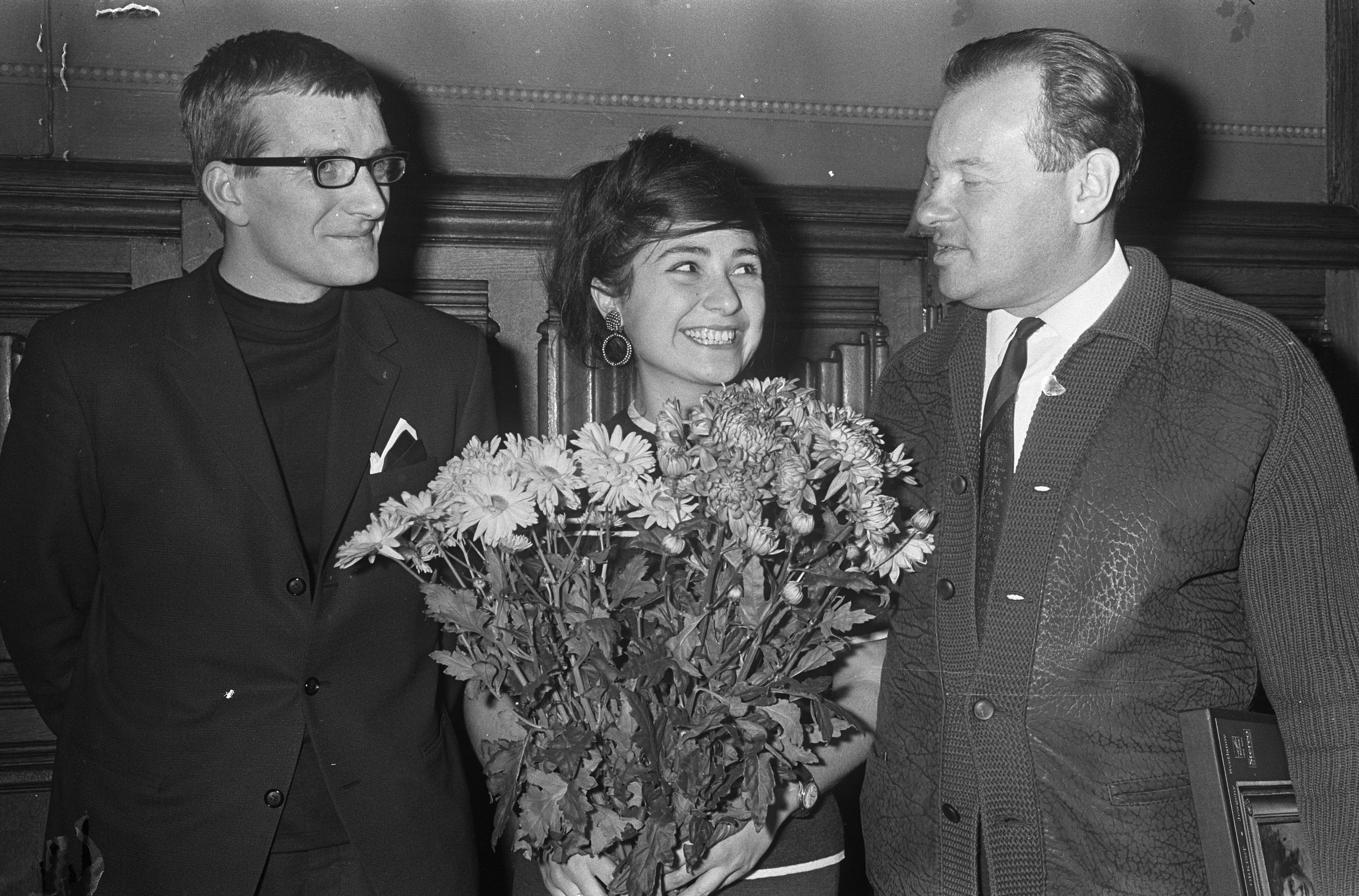
Isakadze greeted with flowers in Amsterdam, 1967, pictured with Maxim Shostakovich and Yevgeny Svetlanov

Beginning in 1965 she played as a violin soloist with conductors such as Jiri Kout, Paavo Berglund, Vladimir Verbitsky, Jiří Bělohlávek, Valery Gergiev, Yehudi Menuhin, Eri Klas, Aleksandr Dmitriyev, Kurt Masur, Thomas Sanderling, Michail Jurowski, Jukka-Pekka Saraste, Hiroyuki Iwaki, Rudolf Kempe, Václav Neumann, Mariss Jansons, Yan Pascal Tortelier, Herbert Blomstedt, Gintaras Rinkevičius, Neeme Järvi, Dmitry Liss and Charles Dutoit.

She was concertmaster of the Chamber Orchestra of Georgia for several years, and its chief conductor and artistic director in 1981. She had the idea to create a festival named "Musicians are Joking", and held them from 1982 to 1989. From 1983 Isakadze was artistic director of various international festivals, such as in Eichstädt (Germany), "Night Serenades" in Pitsunda (Abkhazia/Georgia), Open Air Festival in Batumi (Georgia), the Festival of Arts in Borjomi (Georgia) and the Liana Isakadze Festival in Vienna and Lichtenstein. In 1990, she and the Chamber Orchestra of Georgia relocated to Ingolstadt, supported by the town, Audi and the Government of Georgia, to open new venues of performance for the orchestra. She founded and directed there the David Oistrakh Academy of String Instruments.

She played chamber music with Gustav Rivinius, Alexander Slobodyanik, Maxim Vengerov, Barbara Hendricks, Gidon Kremer, Franz Hummel, Natalia Gutman, Grigori Zhislin, Alexander Rudin, David Geringas, Frida Bauer, Maria Yudina, Igor Oistrakh, Dimitri Alexeev, Ivan Monighetti, Eduard Brunner, Yuri Bashmet, Alexander Kniazev, Alexei Lubimov, Justus Frantz, Arto Noras, Dmitry Sitkovetsky, Viktor Tretiakov and many others.

Isakadze became artistic director of a new Georgian State Chamber Orchestra in 1995, a position she held it until 2004. In 2009 she formed a Chamber Orchestra of Young Musicians of Southern and Eastern Europe. After 2011, she formed an ensemble – orchestra "Virtuosi from Facebook". The musicians who took part in this venture were famous musicians from various countries and their friends on Facebook. Its first performances took place at the Liana Isakadze Festivals of "Friends of Facebook" and "Night Serenades" in August 2011 in Batumi (Georgia).

From March 1989 to December 1991, Isakadze was also a People's Deputy of the Soviet Union. She was awarded the title of People's Artist of the USSR (1988), Meritorious Artist of the Georgian SSR (1970), the State Prize of Georgia (1975, 1983, 2002), and the Order of Honour of Georgia (1998, 2002).

=== Personal life and death ===
Isakadze lived in Ingolstadt from 1990 for five years, working there with the Chamber Orchestra of Georgia. She lived at times in France, in Paris, Grasse and Cannes. Her last residence was Tbilisi. She suffered from dementia in her last years.

Isakadze died in Tbilisi on 5 July 2024, at the age of 77.

== Recordings ==
Isakadze recorded Aleksi Machavariani's Violin Concerto in 1977 with the USSR Radio Symphony Orchestra conducted by Vakhtang Machavariani. One reviewer described her as "up to the technical demands" in a style of post-war Russian tradition. In 1980 and 1981 she recorded two contrasting concertos with the USSR State Academic Symphony Orchestra conducted by Alexander Lazarev, the Violin Concerto by Sibelius and Arnold Schoenberg's Violin Concerto, Op. 36. A reviewer who had admired her rendering of Vivaldi's The Four Seasons in concert, wrote that she was at the height of her power, "digging into a work with such earnestness and such devotion that the music feels at times over-sized". He noted that her approach "adds a dimension that is hard to define but attracted me with the same intensity as those Vivaldi concertos all those years ago".

During the 1990s she recorded in Ingolstadt with the Chamber Orchestra of Georgia, working as soloist, arranger and conductor. They recorded works by Tchaikovsky in 1992, Souvenir de Florence, Souvenir d'un lieu cher, Valse-Scherzo, and Sérénade mélancolique. The same year they recorded compositions by Georgian composers, Otar Taktakishvili Violin Concerto, Sulkhan Nasidze's Double Concerto for violin and cello, Nodar Gabunia's Symphony No. 3 "Giocconda", and Sulkhan Tsintsadze's Phantasie, with cellist Natascha Mandenova. In 1997 they recorded works by Tigran Mansurian, his Cello Concerto, a Double Concerto for violin and cello, and the Violin Concerto, with Ivan Monighetti as the cellist.

Her recording of Alfred Schnittke's Violin Sonata No. 2 "Quasi una sonata", with pianist Vladimir Skanavi, was included in an anniversary edition of Schnittke's music in 2020.
