= Eurovision Young Musicians 2002 =

Eleventh edition of the Eurovision Young Musicians

Dates and venue
- Semi-final 1: 15 June 2002
- Semi-final 2: 16 June 2002
- Final: 19 June 2002
- Venue: Konzerthaus; Berlin, Germany

Organisation
- Organiser: European Broadcasting Union (EBU)

Production
- Host broadcaster: Zweites Deutsches Fernsehen (ZDF)
- Director: János S. Darvas
- Executive producer: Ludger Mias
- Musical director: Marek Janowski
- Presenter: Julia Fischer

Participants
- Number of entries: 20
- Number of finalists: 7
- Debuting countries: Romania
- Returning countries: Italy
- Non-returning countries: Belgium; France; Hungary; Ireland; Spain; Turkey
- Participation map: Finalist countries Countries eliminated in the preliminary round Countries that participated in the past but not in 2002

Vote
- Voting system: Jury chose their top 3 favourites by vote.
- Winning musician: Austria; Dalibor Karvay

Eurovision Young Musicians 2002 was the 11th edition of Eurovision Young Musicians. It consisted of two semi-finals on 15 and 16 June and a final on 19 June 2002, held at Konzerthaus in Berlin, Germany, and presented by Julia Fischer. It was organised by the European Broadcasting Union (EBU) and host broadcaster Zweites Deutsches Fernsehen (ZDF). The Deutsches Symphonie-Orchester Berlin conducted by Marek Janowski accompanied all competing performers.

Musicians representing twenty countries took part in the competition, with seven of them participating in the televised final. Romania made their début while Italy returned to the contest for the first time since 1990 (their first and only participation in one of the Eurovision family of events in the 2000s, with their next being the Eurovision Song Contest 2011). Greece made its first appearance in a televised final.

The winner was violinist Dalibor Karvay representing Austria, with clarinetist Sarah Williamson representing the United Kingdom placing second, and cellist Karmen Pecar representing Slovenia placing third.

== Location ==
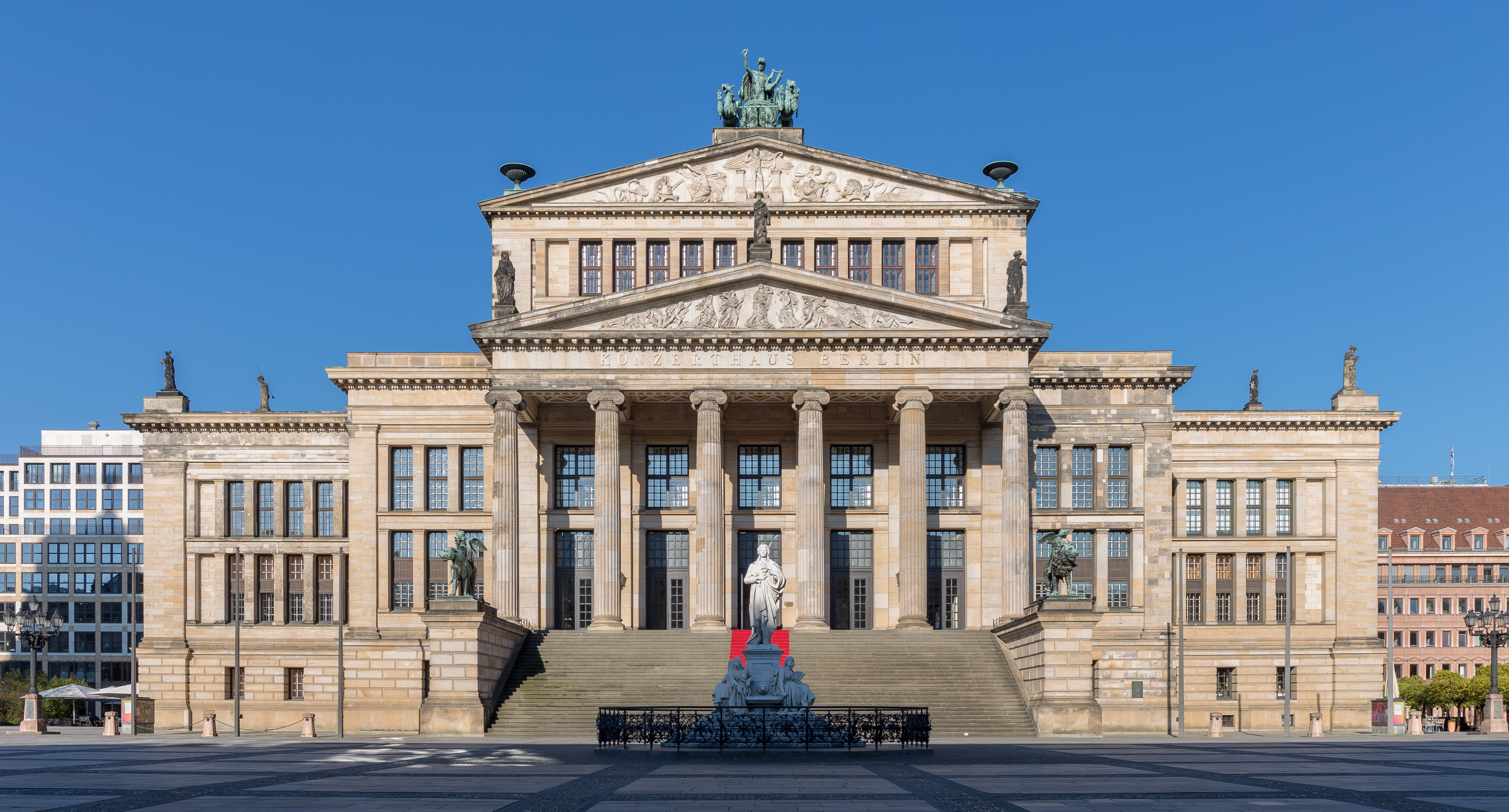
Konzerthaus, Berlin. Venue of Eurovision Young Musicians 2002.

The Konzerthaus Berlin, a concert hall situated on the Gendarmenmarkt square in the central Mitte district of Berlin, was the host venue for the 2002 edition of Eurovision Young Musicians.

Built as a theatre from 1818 to 1821 under the name of the Schauspielhaus Berlin, later also known as the Theater am Gendarmenmarkt and Komödie, its usage changed to a concert hall after the Second World War and its name changed to its present one in 1994. It is the home to the Konzerthausorchester Berlin symphony orchestra.

== Format ==
Julia Fischer was the host of the 2002 contest.

== Participants and results ==
=== Preliminary round ===
Broadcasters from twenty countries took part in the preliminary round of the 2002 contest, of which seven qualified to the televised grand final. The following participants failed to qualify.

Country	Broadcaster	Performer	Instrument
Croatia	HRT	Ivo Dropulić	Violin
Cyprus	CyBC	Andréasz Joannídisz	Cello
Denmark	DR	Philippe Benjamin Skow	Violin
Estonia	ETV	Mihkel Poll	Piano
Finland	Yle	Joonatan Rautiola	Saxophone
Italy	RAI	Anna Tifu	Violin
Latvia	LTV	Ruslans Viļenskis	Cello
Netherlands	NOS	Fleur Bouverie	Clarinet
Norway	NRK	Vilde Frang Bjærke	Violin
Romania	TVR	Cristian Andrei Fatou	Violin
Russia	RTR	Nikita Borisoglebsky	Violin
Sweden	SVT	Jacob Koranyi	Cello
Switzerland	SRG SSR	Beatrice Berrut	Piano

=== Final ===
Awards were given to the top three participants. The third-place musician received €2,000, second-place €3,000, and the winner €5,000. The table below highlights these using gold, silver, and bronze. The placing results of the remaining participants is unknown and never made public by the European Broadcasting Union.

Participants and results
R/O	Country	Broadcaster	Performer(s)	Instrument	Piece(s)	Composer(s)	Pl.
1	Austria	ORF	Dalibor Karvay	Violin	Carmen Fantasie	Franz Waxman	1
2	United Kingdom	BBC	Sarah Williamson	Clarinet	Clarinet Concerto	Aaron Copland	2
3	Greece	ERT	Theodore Milkov	Percussion	Marimbaphone Concerto	Ney Rosauro	
4	Czech Republic	ČT	Jakub Tylman	Cello	Hungarian Rhapsody	David Popper	
5	Germany	ZDF	Alina Pogostkin	Violin	Introduction and Rondo Capriccioso	Camille Saint-Saens	
6	Slovenia	RTVSLO	Karmen Pecar	Cello	Cello Concerto	Dmitri Shostakovitch	3
7	Poland	TVP	Piotr Jasiurkowski	Violin	Gipsy Melodies	Pablo de Sarasate	

== Jury members ==
The jury members consisted of the following:

- United States – Leonard Slatkin (head)
- Italy – Gian Carlo Menotti
- Russia – Anna Gourari
- Slovakia – Jack Martin Händler
- Switzerland – Aurèle Nicolet
- Germany – Hans Peter Pairott
- United States/Austria – Carole Dawn Reinhart

== Broadcasting ==
The 20th anniversary competition was transmitted live over the Eurovision Network by 11 out of the 27 broadcasters in 23 countries. Belgium, Iceland and Malta broadcast the contest (the latter two for the first time), in addition to the competing countries. Known details on the broadcasts in each country, including the specific broadcasting stations and commentators are shown in the tables below.

Broadcasters in participating countries
Country	Broadcaster(s)	Channel(s)	Commentator(s)	Ref.
Austria	ORF	ORF 2 (Note: Delayed broadcast, in a shortened format, on 22 June at 09:05)		
Croatia	HRT			
Cyprus	CyBC (live)			
Czech Republic	ČT	ČT2 (Note: Delayed broadcast on 10 August)		
Denmark	DR	DR P2 (Note: Delayed broadcast on 23 June at 15:10 CET (14:10 UTC))	Lars Søgaard	
Denmark	DR	DR2 (Note: Delayed two-part broadcast on 21 and 28 September, both of which were aired at 16:00 CET (15:00 UTC))		
Estonia	ERR	ETV (Note: Delayed broadcast on 28 June at 21:50 EEST (18:50 UTC))		
Finland	Yle (live)	TV1		
Germany	ZDF (Note: The contest was summarised in an edition of ...und morgen Weltstar? broadcast on 23 June at 23.45 CET)			
Germany	3sat (live)			
Greece	ERT			
Italy	RAI	Rai 3		
Latvia	LTV			
Netherlands	NOS (live)	Nederland 3		
Norway	NRK (live)	NRK1		
Poland	TVP (live)			
Romania	TVR			
Russia	RTR			
Slovenia	RTVSLO (live)			
Sweden	SVT	SVT1, SVT Europa (Note: Delayed broadcast on 6 July at 22:00 CET (21:00 UTC))	Marianne Söderberg	
Switzerland	TSI (live)			
Switzerland	TSR (live)	TSR 2	Flavia Matea	
Switzerland	DRS	SRF 1 (Note: Delayed broadcast on 22 June at 23:10)		
United Kingdom	BBC	BBC Two (Note: Delayed broadcast on 13 July at 15:35 UTC)	Stephanie Hughes	

Broadcasters in non-participating countries
Country	Broadcaster(s)	Channel(s)	Commentator(s)	Ref.
Belgium	RTBF (live)	La Deux		
Belgium	VRT			
Iceland	RÚV (live)			
Malta	PBS			

== See also ==
- Eurovision Song Contest 2002
