= Nicolas Koeckert =

German violinist of Brazilian origin (born 1979)

Nicolas Koeckert (born November 9, 1979) is a German violinist of Brazilian origin. He has been the concertmaster of the UAE National Orchestra since 2025.

== Biography ==
=== Studies ===
The German-Brazilian violinist Nicolas Koeckert, who comes from a traditional musical family, was born in 1979 in Munich, Germany. At the age of 5 he received as a gift his first violin from his grandfather. Nicolas started his academic studies when he was 16 at the Hochschule für Musik Würzburg with Grigori Zhislin. Continuing his studies with Zakhar Bron at the Hochschule für Musik Köln from 1998, Nicolas started to perform regularly as an international soloist. In 2005 he graduated with highest distinctions and two years later finished his master's degree.

In 2001, he won the first prize at the ‘International Competition for Young Violinists Novosibirsk’ in Russia, where he also received the special prize for the best performance of the commissioned composition and the ‘Cultural Prize of Novosibirsk’. In 2002 Nicolas Koeckert became the first German to win a prize at the world-famous ‘International Tchaikovsky Competition’ in Moscow. As a recognition for his artistic achievements in the same summer he was awarded with the ‘Artist Promotion Prize of the Bavarian Government’. In the year 2003, he was prize winner at the Montreal International Musical Competition and also was awarded the second prize at the ‘Liana Isakadze International Violin Competition’ in St. Petersburg, Russia.

=== Concert career ===
Nicolas performs regularly as a soloist with orchestras from Europe, Asia, Brazil, Mexico and North America, which have included the Orchestre Symphonique de Montréal, Russian National Symphony Orchestra, Bavarian Radio Symphony Orchestra, Royal Philharmonic Orchestra, Bamberg Symphony Orchestra, German Radio Philharmonic Orchestra Saarbrücken Kaiserslautern, KBS Symphony Orchestra, Zagreb Philharmonic Orchestra, Orquestra Sinfônica do Estado de São Paulo, Orquestra Sinfônica Brasileira, Orquestra Sinfônica do Teatro Nacional Brasilia, Orquestra Experimental de Repertório, Norrköping Symphony Orchestra, Capella Istropolitana, Lithuanian Chamber Orchestra, Georgian Chamber Orchestra, and Munich Chamber Orchestra, and has collaborated with conductors Lawrence Foster, Sir Colin Davis, Michail Jurowski, Jonathan Nott, Asher Fisch, José Serebrier, Christoph Poppen, Saulius Sondeckis, Theodor Guschlbauer, Andris Nelsons, Ari Rasilainen, Ira Levin, Nicholas Milton, Marc Piollet, Emil Tabakov, Victor Pablo Pérez, Osvaldo Ferreira, Fabio Mechetti, Benjamin Northey, Gabriel Feltz and Markus Poschner, among others.

== Recordings ==
For the Bavarian Radio Station, the violinist has recorded various pieces like Ballade Sonata for solo violin No. 3 by Eugène Ysaÿe, Edvard Grieg's Sonata in C minor, the Sonata by Maurice Ravel, Valse-Scherzo, Op. 34 and Melody, Op. 42/3 by Tchaikovsky, the Béla Bartók's Solo Sonata, Antonio Bazzini's Dance of the Goblins, Sibelius and the Second Violin Concerto of Karol Szymanowski.

The CD recording released by Naxos and featuring the Russian and Slavonic Miniatures by Fritz Kreisler was twice selected as the Recording Of The Month in 2006 by both The Strad Magazine and in 2004 by Naxos in Germany.

His CD with pianist Kristina Miller-Koeckert (who is also his wife) presenting works by Igor Frolov was released for Naxos in April 2008. Also this year Nicolas recorded again for Naxos the Violin Concerto and the Concert- Rhapsody by Chatchaturjan with the Royal Philharmonic Orchestra under the baton of Maestro José Serebrier, which will be released in May 2009.

Nicolas teaches regularly and gives masterclasses in Germany and abroad. He is a teacher at the Vienna Conservatory.

== Prizes and awards ==
- 2001 1st prize at the Novosibirsk International Violin Contest
- 2002 Award at the International Tchaikovsky Violin Competition in Moscow
- 2002 Culture prize awarded by the Bavarian state
- 2003 Prize-winner at the Montreal International Music Competition,
- 2003 2nd prize at the International Violin Competition in St. Petersburg.
- 2005 Honour "Strad Selection" awarded by the music magazine „The Strad“for his CD-recording of Kreisler’s transcriptions of Russian and Slavic pieces.

== Instrument ==
Nicolas Koeckert plays a Guadagnini violin.
