= Nikita Boriso-Glebsky =

Nikita Boriso-Glebsky Никита Аркадьевич Борисоглебский
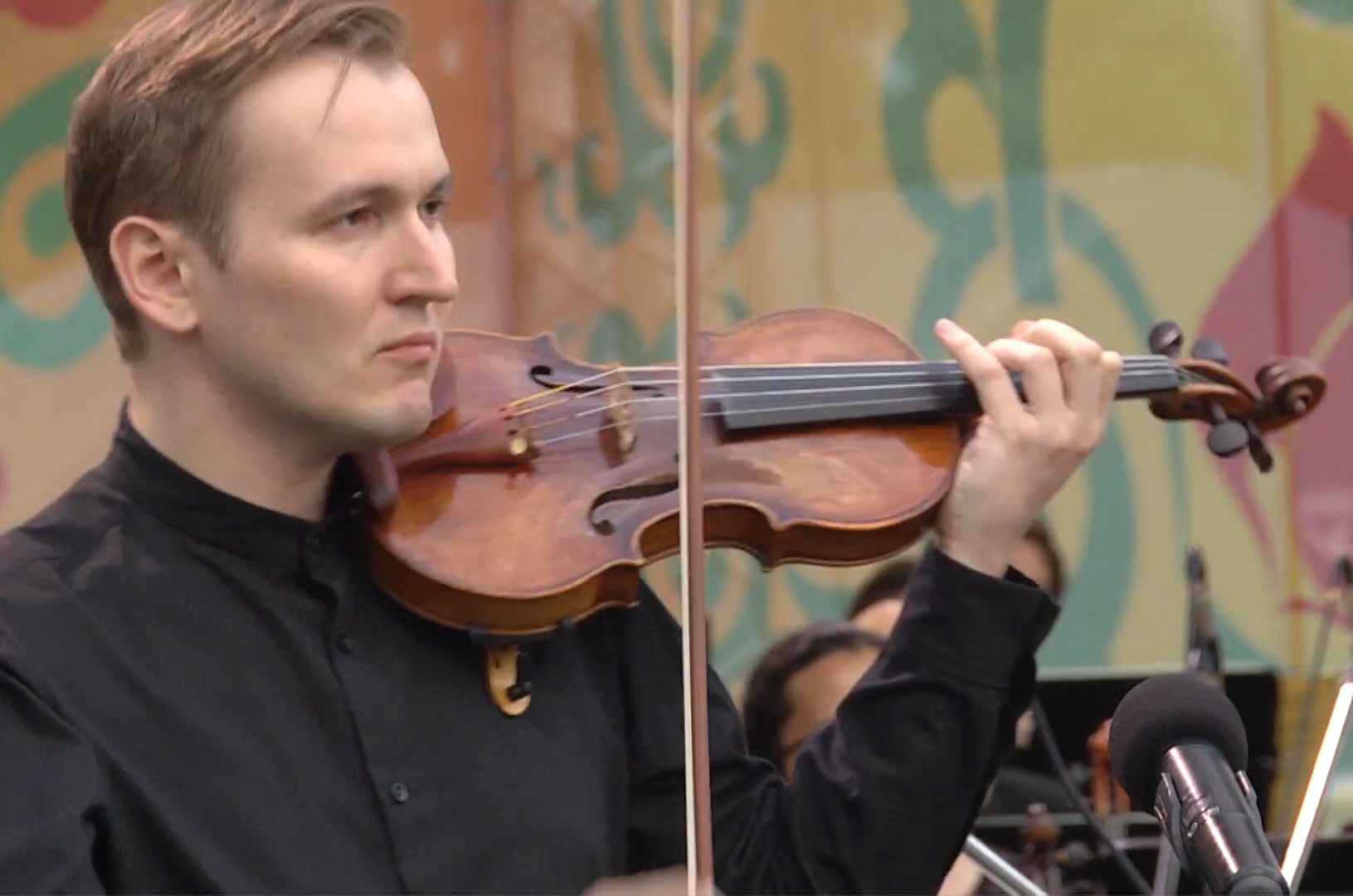
- Boriso-Glebsky in 2018

Background information
- Born: 30 August 1985 (age 40); Volgodonsk, Russian SFSR, USSR
- Genres: Classical music
- Occupation: Violinist
- Years active: 2006–present

Nikita Arkadievich Boriso-Glebsky (Russian: Никита Аркадьевич Борисоглебский; born 30 August 1985) is a Russian violinist, soloist of the Moscow Philharmonic Society, and winner of international music contests. He represented Russia at the Eurovision Young Musicians 2002.

== Early life ==
Nikita Boriso-Glebsky was born in Volgodonsk, Southern Russia, in 1985. His parents work as chemists. Boriso-Glebsky started his musical instruments training at the age of six. He took up piano lessons first but then decided to play violin after starting school. At the age of ten, he performed with the Rostov Philharmonic Orchestra the Violin Concert No. 22 by Gioivanni Viotti.

At the age of fourteen Boriso-Glebsky graduated to the Moscow State Tchaikovsky Conservatory to the violin division by Professor Eduard Grach and Associate Professor Tatiana Berkul. When he was studying at the conservatory, he took part in the Keshet Eilon Summer Mastercourses in Israel, under the guidance of Ida Haendel and Shlomo Mintz. Furthermore, the young violinist had started playing in the Moscovia Chamber Orchestra and consequently passed all stages up to the concertmaster position.

In 2001 Boriso-Glebsky became an artist of the Moscow Philharmonic Society. Two years later, aged eighteen, he turned to perform as a soloist. In 2005 he started on postgraduate studies and research on the English violin music from the nineteen and twentieth centuries. He also took courses outside Russia, particularly by Augustin Dumay in the Queen Elisabeth Music Chapel, and by Ana Chumachenco in the Kronberg Academy. In Belgium Boriso-Glebsky was given for performing the violin II Patti by Antonio Stradivari that let him take part in prestigious contests further.

== Career ==
=== Music profession ===
Boriso-Glebsky has a varied musical repertoire and has performed several compositions of classical music, including works from: Johann Sebastian Bach, Antonio Vivaldi, Wolfgang Amadeus Mozart, Ludwig van Beethoven, and many more. Boriso-Glebsky has also performed works from many musicians of the twentieth century, including Benjamin Britten, Sergei Prokofiev, and Béla Bartók. Boriso-Glebsky has performed regularly in Russia and abroad. Some of the festivals that he has taken part in include Salzburg Festival, Rheingau Musik Festival, and Les Sons Intensifs (Lessines).

On 19 June 2002, he represented Russia at the Eurovision Young Musicians 2002, which was held in Berlin, Germany. In 2014 Boriso-Glebsky, along with Solenne Païdassi, Dana Zemstov, David Cohen, Uxía Martínez Botana, and Andreas Hering, founded the Rubik Ensemble, based on the ideology of the six edges and colours of the Rubik's Cube.

In 2010, Boriso-Glebsky presented two concert programmes called "Three Tchaikovskys" which broadcast concerts written by Pyotr Tchaikovsky, Boris Tchaikovsky and Alexander Tchaikovsky. These concerts took place in Moscow and Saint Petersburg.

=== Contest judging ===
Boriso-Glebsky has acted as a professional juror at several competitions. In 2014 he was a jury member at the National Russian Music Competition, held in Moscow; and at the International Vladimir Spivakov Violin Competition, held in the Bashkortostan capital, Ufa, in 2016.

== Discography ==
Year	Title	Label	Format
2008	Kuzma Bodrov: Caprice for Violin and Orchestra	DW podcast	Digital download
2011	Henri Vieuxtemps: Complete Violin Concertos	Fuga Libera	CD
2013	Édouard Lalo: Symphonie espagnole, Sonate, Arlequin, Guitare	Fuga Libera	CD

== Awards and achievements ==
Year	Ceremony	Location	Result
2000	Laureate at the New Names Foundation	Moscow, Russia	Won
2002	Yampolsky International Violin Competition	Penza, Russia	3rd
2002	Eurovision Young Musicians 2002	Berlin, Germany	Semi-finalist
2003	International Competition for Violin	Kloster Schöntal, Germany	1st
2006	Laureate at the Joseph Joachim International Violin Competition	Hannover, Germany	Won
2007	Moscow International David Oistrakh Violin Competition	Moscow, Russia	1st
2007	International Tchaikovsky Competition	Moscow, Russia	2nd
2009	Queen Elisabeth Music Competition	Brussels, Belgium	5th
2009	International Maya Plisetskaya and Rodion Shchedrin Foundation	Mainz, Germany	Violinist of the year
2010	Montreal International Music Competition	Montréal, Canada	3rd
2010	International Fritz Kreisler Competition	Vienna, Austria	1st
2010	Laureate at the International Jean Sibelius Violin Competition	Helsinki, Finland	1st
2011	Italian Strings Academy and Antonio Vivaldi Society	Cremona, Italy	Virtuoso
2011	Wihuri Sibelius Prize	Helsinki, Finland	Jean Sibelius Medal
2013	Monte Carlo Violin Masters	Monte Carlo, Monaco	1st
