= Montreal International Piano Competition =

Montreal International Piano Competition may refer to:

- Montreal International Music Competition (1965–1997)
- Montreal International Musical Competition (since 2001)
