= Hawijch Elders =

Dutch violinist

- Born: 31 October 1998 (age 26); Grenoble, France
- Genres: classical
- Instrument: violin
- Website: www.hawijchelders.com

Hawijch Elders is a Dutch violinist born on 31 October 1998.

== Biography ==
Elders started violin lessons at the age of six at Mea Fontijn, and from 2011-2016 she received violin lessons and chamber music lessons from Benzion Shamir. She has been following her violin training with Ilya Grubert at the Conservatorium van Amsterdam since 2016, where she completed the Bachelor of Music (2020) and Master of Music (2022) degree programmes with highest distinction. Since September 2022, she is Artist in Residence at the Queen Elisabeth Music Chapel, where she studies with Augustin Dumay.

She received many prizes and awards at national and international violin competitions. In May 2023, Hawijch Elders won the first prize at the 8th International Violin Competition Henri Marteau, with a performance of Paganini's first violin concerto with the Hofer Symphoniker conducted by Christoph-Mathias Mueller, and she received special awards for the interpretation of works by Johann Sebastian Bach, Max Reger and Henri Marteau. In 2021, she was awarded the second prize at the Odesa International Violin Competition and the first prize at the 5th Leonid Kogan International Competition. In 2018, Elders won four prizes at the international competition 'Rodolfo Lipizer' in Italy. Beside the second prize she was also awarded for three special prizes: the prize for best performance of a Sivori etude, the prize for most talented young violinist and the prize for best performance of a 20th century sonata. During 2018, at the Netherlands violin competition "Oskar Back", Hawijch Elders won the second prize and the Audience Award.

Hawijch Elders often performs in the Netherlands and abroad. As a soloist she played with the Real Filharmonía de Galicia, Domestica Rotterdam, the Amsterdam Symphony Orchestra, the Nieuwe Philharmonie Utrecht, the Netherlands Philharmonic Orchestra, the Residentie Orchestra, Amadeus Chamber Orchestra of Polish Radio, Odessa Philharmonic Orchestra and the Orquestra Clássica da Madeira. She made her debut in Bozar, Brussels, in March 2023, performing Mozart’s fourth Violin Concerto with the Wiener KammerOrchester conducted by Augustin Dumay. She has worked in chamber music concerts with Valeriy Sokolov, Quirine Viersen and Maria Milstein.

== Instrument ==
Hawijch Elders plays a Gennaro Gagliano violin (Naples ca.1755) and a Dominique Peccatte bow on loan from the Nationaal Muziekinstrumenten Fonds. The violin belongs to the 'collection Willem G. Vogelaar' and the bow belongs to the 'collection Tettelaar'.

== Awards ==
- 2025 – Antonio Mormone International Prize
- 2023 – 57th "Premio Paganini" International Violin Competition, 4th Prize
- 2023 – 8th International Violin Competition Henri Marteau, 1st Prize
- 2022 – XII International Jean Sibelius Violin Competition, Semi-Finalist and Sibelius family prize
- 2021/2022 – Dutch Classical Talent, Laureate
- 2021 – Leonid Kogan International Competition for Young Violinists, 1st Prize
- 2021 – II Odesa International Violin Competition, 2nd Prize
- 2019 – Kersjes-vioolbeurs (Kersjes van de Groenekan Award)
- 2019 – 3rd Oleh Krysa International Violin Competition, Laureate
- 2018 – 37th International Violin Competition ‘Premio Rodolfo Lipizer’, 2nd Prize
- 2018 – Netherlands Violin Competition "Oskar Back", 2nd Prize and Audience Prize
- 2014 – Classic Young Master Award 2014
- 2013 – Prinses Christina Concours - National Finals, 2nd Prize and Audience Prize
- 2010 – Iordens Viooldagen, 1st Prize
