= Montreal International Violin Competition =

Montreal International Violin Competition may refer to:

- Montreal International Music Competition (1966-1991)
- Montreal International Musical Competition (since 2001)
