= UAE National Orchestra =

Orchestra in the United Arab Emirates

The UAE National Orchestra (UAENO) is a 100-member orchestra based in Abu Dhabi. It performs across the seven emirates of the United Arab Emirates. It was founded in 2025 and started performing in January 2026. Algerian UNESCO Artist for Peace Amine Kouider, previously at the Saudi National Orchestra and Choir, is music director and conductor, German violinist Nicolas Koeckert is concertmaster, and Sheikha Alia is managing director. The opera blends Arabic and Western musical traditions. There are 70 full-time musicians and 30 part-time choir members. Emiratis make up 15% of the ensemble.

== See also ==
- UAE Philharmonic Orchestra
