= Paula Šūmane =

Latvian violinist

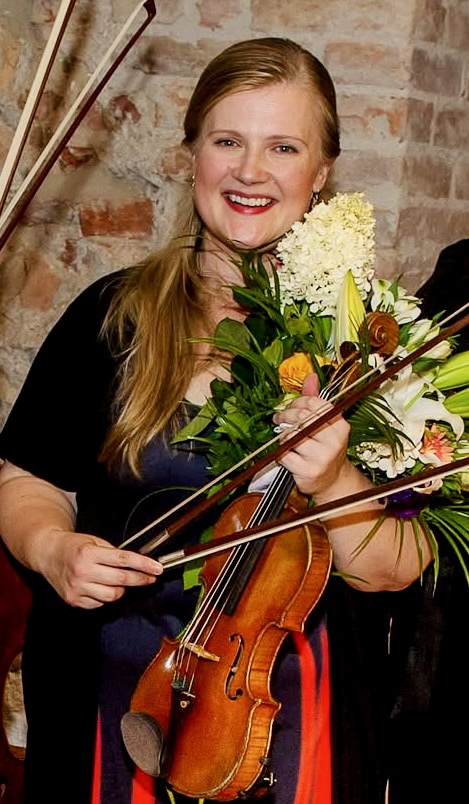
- Education: University of Music and Performing Arts in Graz
- Occupation: Concert violinist
- Awards: Grand Music Award of Latvia, The Golden Microphone

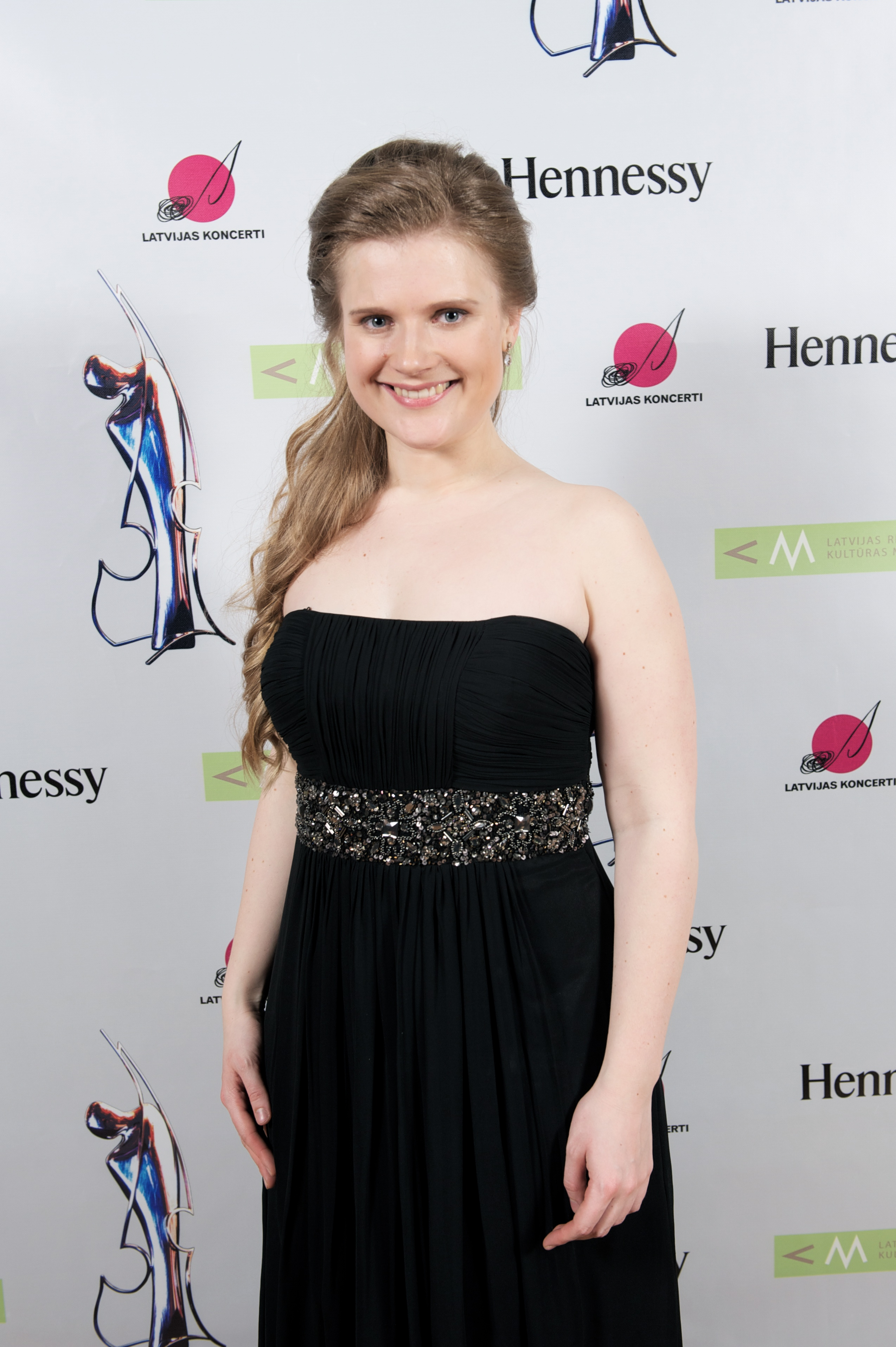
Šūmane at the ceremony of the 2012 Great Music Award of Latvia

Paula Šūmane (pronounced Schumann) is a Latvian concert violinist and the prize winner of international violin competitions, the Grand Music Award of Latvia and the Golden Microphone. She is a graduate of the Conservatoire national supérieur de musique et de danse de Paris and the University of Music and Performing Arts in Graz, Austria. As a soloist, Paula Šūmane has performed with various symphony and chamber orchestras, including the Lisbon Metropolitan Orchestra, the Hof Symphony Orchestra, the Baden-Baden Philharmonic Orchestra, the Latvian National Symphony Orchestra, the Lithuanian State Symphony Orchestra, Sinfonietta Rīga, the Liepāja Symphony Orchestra, the Latvian National Opera Orchestra. Šūmane is frequently invited to give violin masterclasses.

== Education ==
Šūmane began her musical education in Latvia at the Emils Darzins Music School in Riga and the Jurmala Music School. At the age of 15, she entered the Paris Conservatory in the violin class of Boris Garlitsky. After graduating, she completed her master's degree at the University of Music and Performing Arts in Graz, Austria, in the violin class of Yair Kless.

== Awards ==
Šūmane is the winner of the Grand Music Award of Latvia in the category "Debut of the Year" in 2011 and was nominated in the category "Concert of the Year" in 2022. She is a prize-winner of numerous international and national violin competitions, including the International Violin Competition Henri Marteau, the International Music Competition "Dr. Luis Sigall" in Chile, the Kloster Schöntal International Competition for Violin in Germany, the "Luigi Nono" music competition in Italy. Šūmane has been included in Latvian Classical Radio's TOP 10 several times - in the categories "Interpretation of the Year" in 2022 and 2024, and "Soloist of the Year" in 2023. In February 2026, her string trio album "The White Birds" won the Annual Latvian Music Recording Award "The Golden Microphone" in the category "Best Classical or Vocal Album".

== Recordings ==
In May 2025, the Latvian national record label SKANI released the album "The White Birds" by Šūmane's string trio Baltia, featuring chamber works by Pēteris Vasks, Gundega Šmite, Tālivaldis Ķeniņš and Gundaris Pone. A significant number Šūmane's recordings are kept in the Latvian Classical Radio archives and regularly streamed. Among them is a recording of Šmite’s string trio "The White Birds", performed at Little Mežotne Palace and recorded by Latvian Classical Radio. The work won the 71st International Rostrum of Composers in Ljubljana, Slovenia in May 2025.
