= Alina Pogostkina =

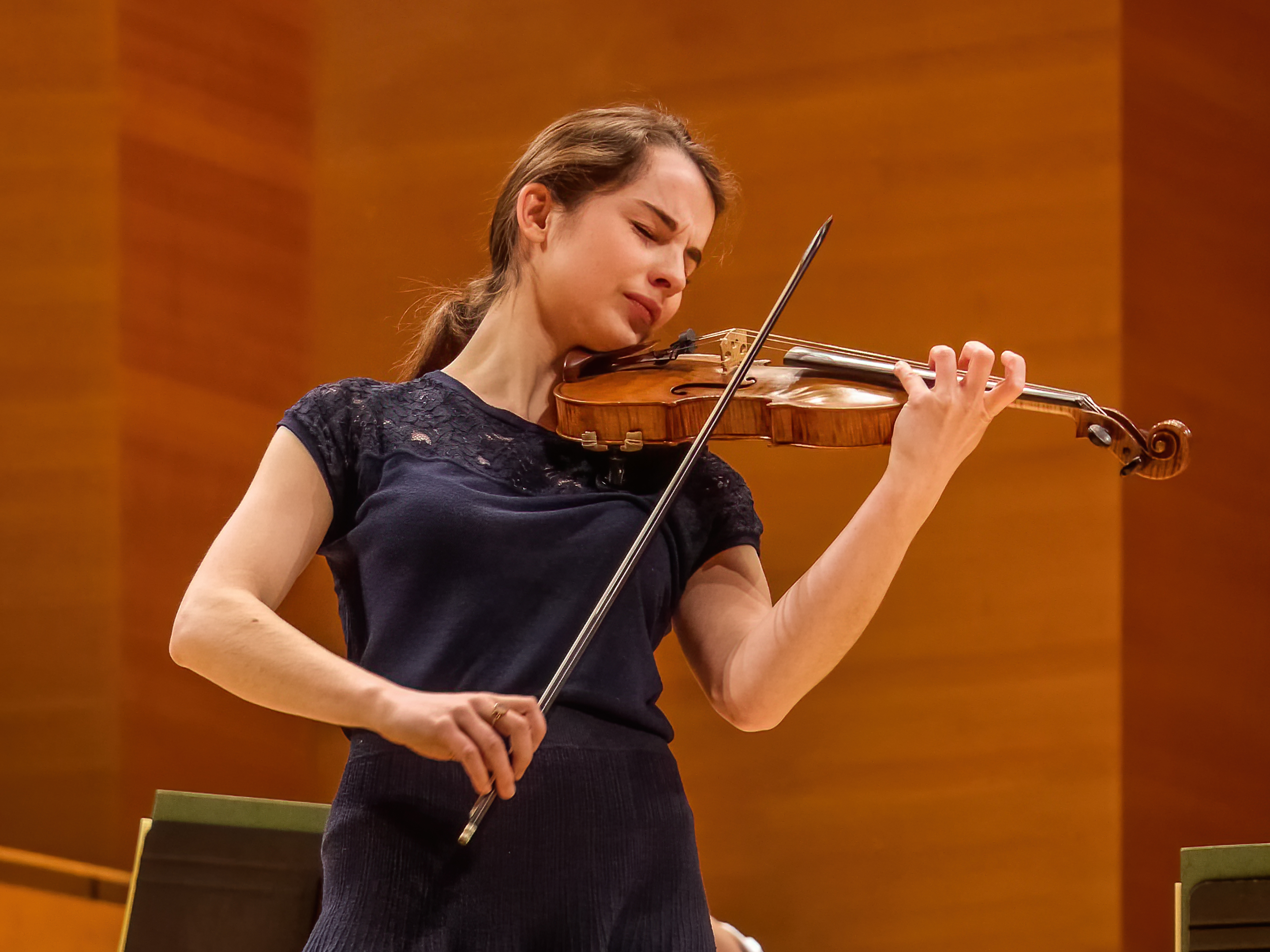

Background information
- Born: 18 November 1983 (age 41); Leningrad, Soviet Union
- Genres: Classical
- Occupation: Violinist
- Website: mindfulmusicmaking.com

Alina Pogostkina (born 18 November 1983 in Leningrad) is a Russian-born German violinist.

== Early life and education ==
Pogostkina is the daughter of two professional violinists. She began playing the violin at the age of four and quickly showed herself to have exceptional talent. She gave her first concerts at the age of five.

In 1992 the family moved to Heidelberg, Germany, where the eight-year-old Alina and her parents initially had to make a living as street musicians.

Pogostkina has competed with success in several international violin competitions. She won the 1997 Louis Spohr Competition, won fourth prize at the Queen Elisabeth Competition in 2001, and in 2005 she won first prize at the Ninth International Jean Sibelius Violin Competition in Helsinki, as well as a special prize for the best interpretation of the Sibelius Violin Concerto. At the time of her victory in the Sibelius competition, Pogostkina was studying at the Hochschule für Musik "Hanns Eisler" in Berlin, where she was a student of Antje Weithaas. She currently lives in Berlin.

== Career ==
Pogostkina has performed with many of the world's major orchestras. At the time of the Sibelius competition she played a modern violin. She played a Stradivarius from the Deutsche Stiftung Musikleben. Since February 2013, she has been playing the Stradivarius Sasserno (1717) from Nippon Music Foundation.
