= Florian Leonhard =

Florian Leonhard MBE (born 1963 in Düsseldorf) is a German-born, London-based violin maker, dealer, restorer and expert. Florian has dedicated his life to studying, restoring and making violins. After studying in at Mittenwald School of Violin Making, he worked for W.E. Hill & Sons becoming head restorer.

== Career ==
His firm, Florian Leonhard Fine Violins, has restored and supplied instruments by Stradivarius and the Guarnerius family for renowned players including Leonidas Kavakos, Daniel Hope, Julian Lloyd Webber and Alina Ibragimova as well as to competition winners.

Florian Leonhard has appeared on BBC, CNBC, and in The Economist, on subjects relating to investment in instruments and their preservation. The Daily Telegraph described him as "the world´s leading expert on fine violins" and the as Financial Times a "world-leading authority on fine violins". He was a jury member at the Benjamin Britten, Karol Lipinski, Henryk Wieniawski and George Enescu violin competitions.. He was on the jury of the 2012 Israeli Music Competition and Ernest Bloch Music Competition. He is a regular contributor to books and articles and has published the book, The Makers of Central Italy. Florian is also president of the Pisogne Making Competition in Cremona.

== Publications ==
- The Makers of Central Italy: Marche and Umbria, Fantigrafica 2011; ISBN 978-88-906383-1-2
- Ein Bildband zum 200. Geburtstag von Jean-Baptiste Vuillaume. Bocholt 1998; ISBN 3-00-002088-8 (with Stefan-Peter Greiner)
