= Dmytro Udovychenko =

Ukrainian classical violinist (born 1990)

Dmytro Udovychenko Дмитро Удовиченко
- Born: June 1, 1999 (age 26); Kharkiv, Ukraine
- Genres: Classical
- Occupation: Musician
- Instrument: Violin
- Website: www.udovychenkodmytro.com

Dmytro Udovychenko (Ukrainian: Дмитро Удовиченко; born 1 June 1999) is a Ukrainian classical violinist who won the 2023 Montreal International Musical Competition and the 2024 Queen Elisabeth Competition.

== Career ==
Born in Kharkiv in 1999 Udovychenko started playing the violin at the age of 5, and attended the Kharkiv Specialized Music Boarding School from age 6, with tutor Ludmila Varenina. He studied at the Folkwang University of the Arts with Boris Garlitsky, first as a young student from 2013, then from 2016 for the bachelor. During Kronberg Academy's 2017 master classes, he earned the Prince of Hesse Prize. He took master classes with Ana Chumachenco, Leonidas Kavakos and Dmitry Sitkovetsky. He earned prizes at competitions, in 2018 second prize at the International Joseph Joachim Violin Competition in Hanover, later third prize at the International Jean Sibelius Violin Competition and first prize at the Singapore International Violin Competition.

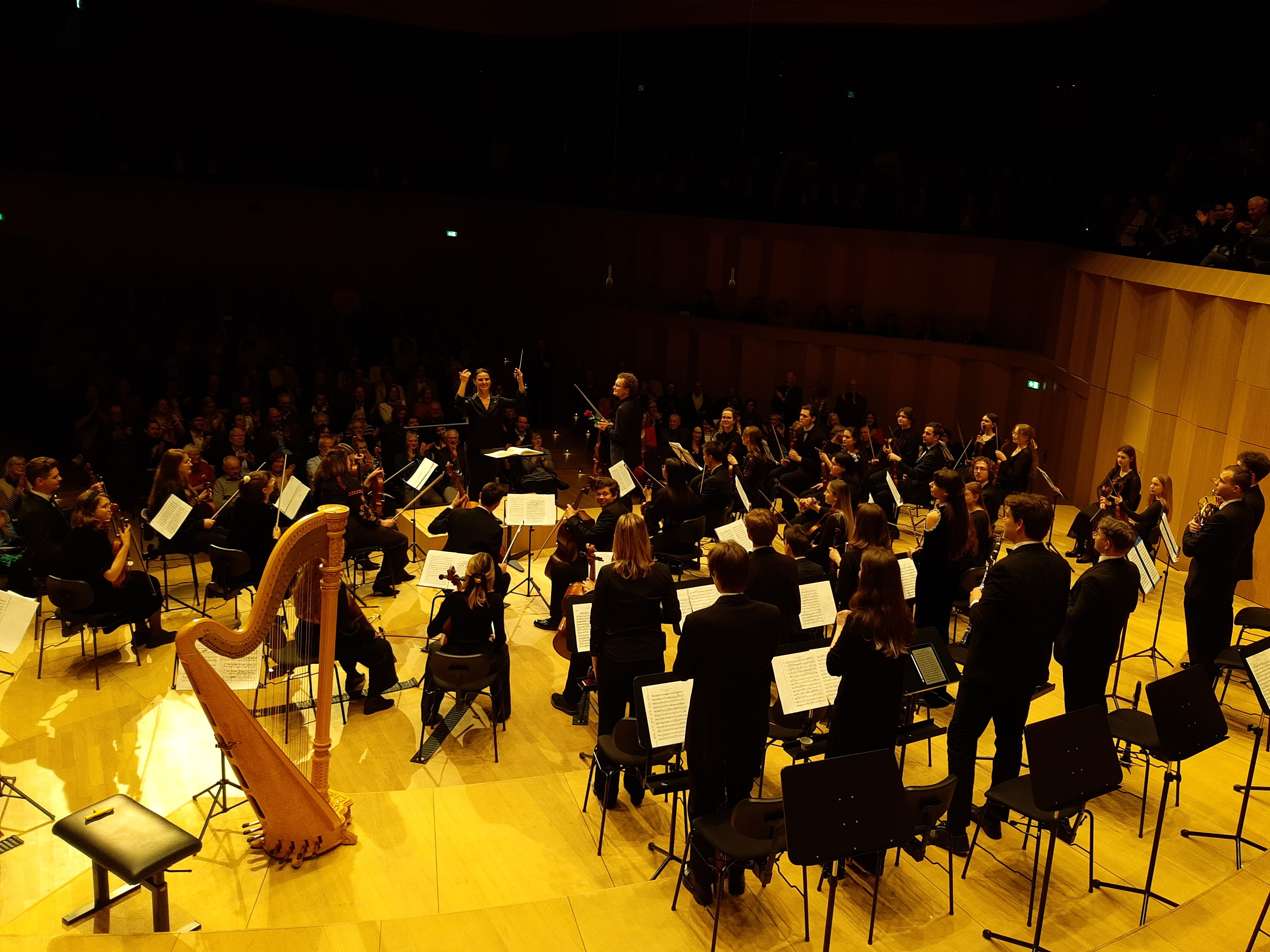
In concert at Casals Forum, 2024

Udovychenko has studied at the Kronberg Academy with Christian Tetzlaff from 2022. He won the 2023 Montreal International Musical Competition and the 2024 Queen Elisabeth Competition. He played Mendelssohn's Violin Concerto with the Youth Symphony Orchestra of Ukraine conducted by Oksana Lyniv at the Casals Forum of the Kronberg Academy, as part of their spring tour 2024.

He plays a 1769 violin 'Ex Kingman' by Giovanni Battista Guadagnini on loan from the Deutsche Stiftung Musikleben.
