= UAE Philharmonic Orchestra =

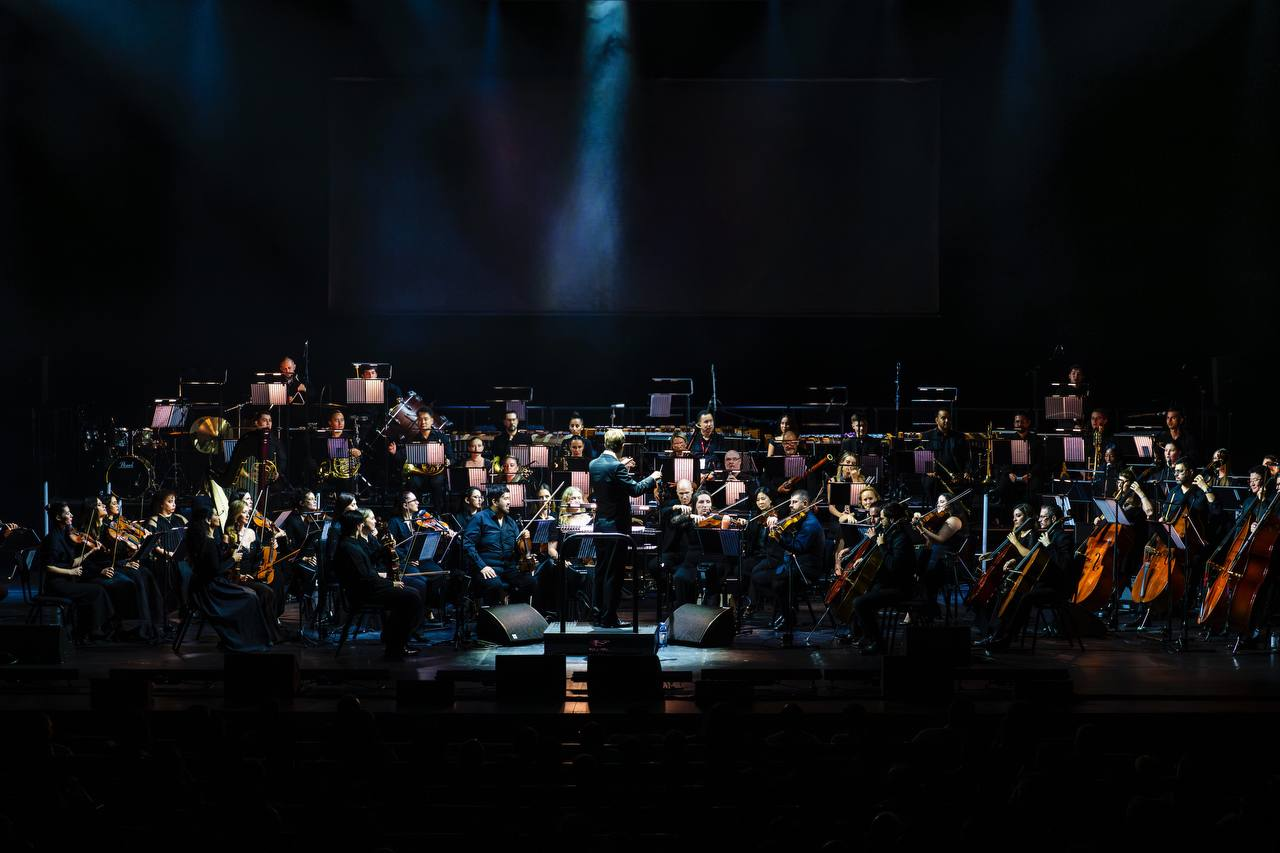
UAE Philharmonic orchestra in United Arab Emirates at Dubai Opera

The UAE Philharmonic Orchestra is an orchestra based in the United Arab Emirates.

The orchestra was relaunched in 2024 by BACKART Production under the baton of conductor Nicolas Mann.

After rebranding, it became the first orchestra in the UAE to offer a full yearly concert season, performing a diverse repertoire ranging from Baroque masterpieces to 21st-century works.

The orchestra is noted for its multicultural ensemble, featuring musicians from 17 different countries, reflecting Dubai's cultural diversity and inclusivity.

== History ==
The UAE Philharmonic Orchestra was originally founded by Philipp Maier, who served as its first conductor and artistic director.

It was active between 2006 and 2012 in the United Arab Emirates, primarily performing in Dubai.

Initially known as the Dubai Philharmonic Orchestra (DPO), it was renamed in 2007 to reflect its broader representation of musicians from across the UAE.

The UAE Philharmonic Orchestra consisted of around 70 professional musicians resident in the UAE, and performed regularly at private events, public concerts and corporate functions.

Its repertory included both European classical music and specially commissioned works influenced by both European and Arabic musical traditions. During its first existence The UAEPO was the only permanent orchestra in the UAE.

Performances in early 2007 were claimed to be well-attended and successful. However, in 2012, Meier resigned and announced the end of the UAEPO, blaming a lack of both public and private sector support.

== Relaunch ==
In September 2024, the UAE Philharmonic Orchestra was revived with BACKART Production overseeing its relaunch and a renewed artistic concept.

Nicolas Mann was appointed as the orchestra's chief conductor and artistic director.

The inaugural concert of the re-established orchestra took place at the Theatre of Digital Art (TODA) in Dubai, marking the official beginning of its new concert season. The event was attended by UAE officials, members of the press, and notable cultural figures.

== Later seasons ==
The orchestra’s 2025 season was described in national press as a landmark year, featuring performances across major venues in the UAE.

In September 2025, the orchestra opened its second season with a performance at the 28th Universal Postal Congress in Dubai.

In October 2025, the orchestra presented the UAE premiere of Symphony No. 1 Valiant by composer Ilaiyaraaja.

The orchestra also participated in international crossover projects, including The World of Hans Zimmer in Dubai under conductor Matt Dunkley and performances with Andrea Bocelli.

In January 2026, the orchestra introduced the Viennese New Year Ball tradition in Dubai.

Khaleej Times and Gulf News described the orchestra as strengthening its role as a cultural ambassador for the UAE.

== Collaborations ==
In 2025, the orchestra entered into cooperation agreements with international philharmonic organizations and cultural institutions, including conductor and artist exchange programmes.

== See also ==
- UAE National Orchestra
