= Elina Vähälä =

Finnish violinist

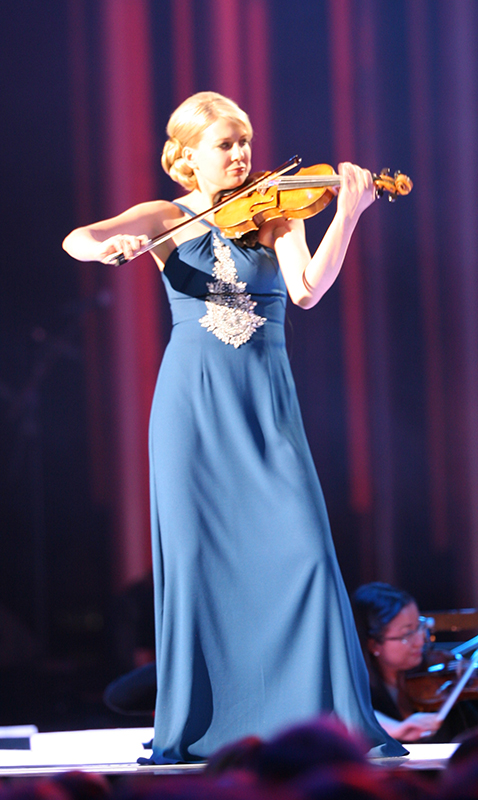
Elina Vähälä at the Nobel Peace Prize Concert in Oslo 2008

Laura Elina Vähälä (born 15 October 1975, Iowa City, Iowa) is a Finnish classical violinist.

== Biography ==
Born in the United States in Iowa City, Iowa, Vähälä began violin studies at the age of three, following her family's return to Finland, at the Lahti conservatory. Her teachers at Lahti included Seppo Reinikainen and Pertti Sutinen. She also studied at the Kuhmo Violin School with Zinaida Gilels, Ilya Grubert and Pavel Vernikov. At the Sibelius Academy Vähälä's teacher was Tuomas Haapanen.

Vähälä made her concerto debut at age 12 with the Lahti Symphony Orchestra (Sinfonia Lahti), conducted by Osmo Vänskä. Vähälä subsequently served as "Young Master Soloist" for the 1993-1994 season with Sinfonia Lahti. Since then, she has regularly collaborated with Sinfonia Lahti on a regular basis, performing as featured soloist on tours in Sweden, UK, South America and Central Europe.

Vähälä was one of the winners of the 1999 Young Concert Artists competition in New York. She gave her New York debut at the 92nd Street Y in 1999. In 2008, she was chosen to perform at the Nobel Peace Prize ceremony which was televised to a worldwide audience.

Vähälä has given world premieres of Aulis Sallinen's Chamber Concerto and Curtis Curtis-Smith's Double Concerto, both written for her and her former husband Ralf Gothóni. In addition, Vähälä gave the Nordic first performance of John Corigliano’s Violin Concerto The Red Violin and commissioned a new violin concerto from composer Jaakko Kuusisto. Both the Corgiliano and Kuusisto concertos were recorded for BIS in 2012 and released in 2013.

In September 2015, Vähälä performed the original 1904 version of the Violin Concerto of Jean Sibelius, the third documented live performance of the original version, with the Finnish Radio Symphony Orchestra conducted by Hannu Lintu. In January 2022, Vähälä gave the North American premiere of the original 1904 version of the Sibelius Violin Concerto in two performances with Osmo Vänskä and the Minnesota Orchestra.

Vähälä is a founding member of the Violin Academy (Viuluakatemia Ry). Funded by the Finnish Cultural Foundation, the academy is a master class based educational project for selected, highly talented young Finnish violinists. Vähälä has been as a professor of violin at the Hochschule für Musik Detmold (2009–2012) and at the Hochschule für Musik in Karlsruhe (2012–2019). Since the autumn of 2019, she is a professor of violin at the University of Music and Performing Arts, Vienna. Vähäla performs on a Giovanni Battista Guadagnini violin from 1780.
