= Dalibor Karvay =

Slovak violinist

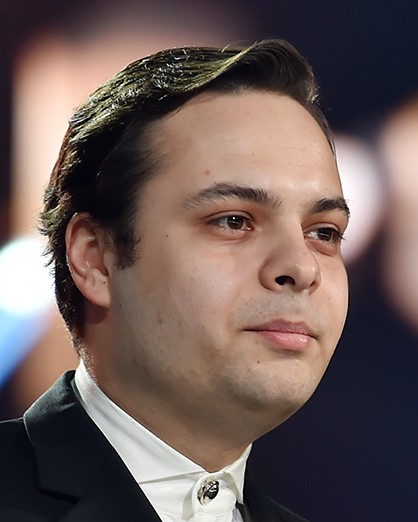
- Karvay in 2017

Background information
- Born: 24 July 1985 (age 41); Vrútky, Slovakia
- Genre: Classical
- Occupation: Violinist
- Instrument: Violin

Dalibor Karvay is a Slovak violinist and pedagogue at Musik und Kunst Privatuniversität der Stadt Wien.

== Biography ==
Karvay was born on 24 July 1985 in Vrútky, Slovakia. At the age of three, he started playing the violin under the guidance of his father. During his studies at the Primary Art School in Vrútky, he made several recordings for the Slovak Radio in Bratislava. After the special study, under the guidance of professor Bohumil Urban, he graduated at the Žilina Conservatoire and from 1999 he studied at the Vienna at the Conservatoire in the class of the renowned professor Boris Kuschnir. He also took part in numerous masterclasses led by famous pedagogists - Euduard Grach, Mintscho Mintschev and Herman Krebbers.

In 2004 Karvay's long-lasting and complicated search for the right instrument was shown in the international documentary Stradivari - Search for Perfection. Besides his concert career Karvay is teaching at the Music and Arts University of the city of Vienna.

== Awards ==
Karvay won Eurovision Young Musicians 2002.
