= Peter Basquin =

American pianist

Peter Basquin is an American pianist and a winner of the Montreal International Music Competition. He attended both Carleton College and Manhattan School of Music where his teachers were Dora Zaslavsky and William Nelson. He was the pianist of the American Composers Orchestra and is Professor Emeritus at the Hunter College.

He had solo appearances at the American and Boston Symphony Orchestras as well as Minnesota, the Westchester Philharmonic and the Hunter Symphony. His conductors during those times were Dennis Russell Davies, Paul Lustig Dunkel, Michael Tilson Thomas, and Gunther Schuller among others. He also collaborated with Lewis Kaplan, Jaime Laredo, Charles Neidich, Nathaniel Rosen, Jacques Thibaud Trio, and Frederick Zlotkin and played with Cassatt Quartet. In 1978 he recorded Marga Richter's 1954 Sonata which was published by Grenadilla Records the same year. (Richter's Sonata was first recorded in 1956 by Menahem Pressler for MGM recordings.)
