= Grigori Zhislin =

Russian violinist (1945 - 2017)

Grigori Yefimovich Zhislin (Russian Григорий Ефимович Жислин; 14 May 1945 in Leningrad – 2 May 2017 in Berlin) was a Russian violinist and pedagogue.

He studied with Yuri Yankelevich at the Moscow Conservatory. At the age of 22, he won the First Prize at the Paganini Competition in Genoa and the Silver Medal at the Queen Elizabeth Competition. Zhislin's repertoire contains concertos and recitals of all genres, for violin as well as for viola.

As a soloist, Zhislin appeared with the Leningrad/St Petersburg Philharmonic, Moscow Philharmonic, State Symphony Orchestra, RRS (Mailand, Turin), RBC Orchestras (Australian), Staatskapelle Dresden, Gewandhausorchester Leipzig, Vienna Symphonic, Sinfonia Varsovia, Warsaw National Philharmonic, Krakow Philharmonic, Stockholm Radio Orchestra. He played under the conductors Herbert Blomstedt, Aldo Ceccato, Erik Klass, Karl Österreicher, Kirill Kondrashin, Dimitri Kitajenko, Alexander Lasarev, Arvid Jansons, Yuri Temirkanov, Mariss Jansons, Woldemar Nelsson, Sauilus Sondeckis, Tadeusz Strugala, Natan Rachlin, Noeme Jarvi, Vladimir Fedosseyev.

Zhislin was invited to the festivals Moscow Stars, Warsaw Autumn, Prague Spring, Fiorentino Maggio, Kuhmo Chamber Music Festival and Pablo Casals Festival in Puerto Rico. He was a member of the jury in the international violin competitions Paganini in Genoa, Montreal, Henryk Wieniawski in Polen, Citta di Brescia, David Oistrakh in Moscow and Yehudi Menuhin in England.

The musician has worked together with the composers Alfred Schnittke, Edison Denisov, Sofia Gubaidulina and Krzysztof Penderecki. In Russia, Zhislin gave the first performance of Penderecki's Violin Concerto; composer and interpreter formed a close relationship; together they recorded all of Penderecki's works for violin and viola. In 1983, following the composer's request, Zhislin began playing the viola in order to give the first performance of Penderecki's Viola Concerto. Penderecki dedicated his Cadenza per Viola Sola to Zhislin.

On April 21, 1984, Krzysztof Penderecki himself conducted the premiere of his Concerto for Viola in Leningrad with Grigori Zhislin as soloist. Zhislin also premiered the Cadenza per Viola Sola on September 10, 1984, at the country home of Penderecki in Luslawicw, Poland.

Zhislin was professor of violin and viola at the Royal College of Music in London and taught as professor at the Hochschule für Musik Wuerzburg, Germany until his death. He was visiting professor in Finland, Norway and Poland. In addition, he gave master classes in Germany, Croatia, the USA, Poland, Italy, France and Spain.

Among his internationally known students are Ilya Grubert, Dmitri Sitkovetsky, Nicolas Koeckert, Daniel Hope, Sergey Khatchatrian, and his son, Yuri Zhislin.

Yuri Zhislin was a Violin and Viola Professor at the Royal College of Music.
