= Christel Lee =

American violinist

- Born: 1990 (age 35–36); Bloomington, Indiana, United States
- Education: Juilliard School; Kronberg Academy; University of Music and Theatre Munich
- Occupation: Violinist
- Spouse: Jonathan Roozeman (m. 2022)
- Awards: First prize, 11th International Jean Sibelius Violin Competition

Korean name
- Hangul: 이수정
- RR: I Sujeong
- MR: I Sujŏng

Christel Lee (born October 25, 1990) is an American violinist. She has studied at the Juilliard School, at the Kronberg Academy, and at the University of Music and Theatre Munich.

Lee won first prize at the 11th International Jean Sibelius Violin Competition in Helsinki in 2015. She has been a Professor and the head of the String Department at the Hochschule für Musik Karlsruhe since 2024.
