= Sergei Stadler =

Russian violinist and conductor (1962–2026)

- Сергей Стадлер
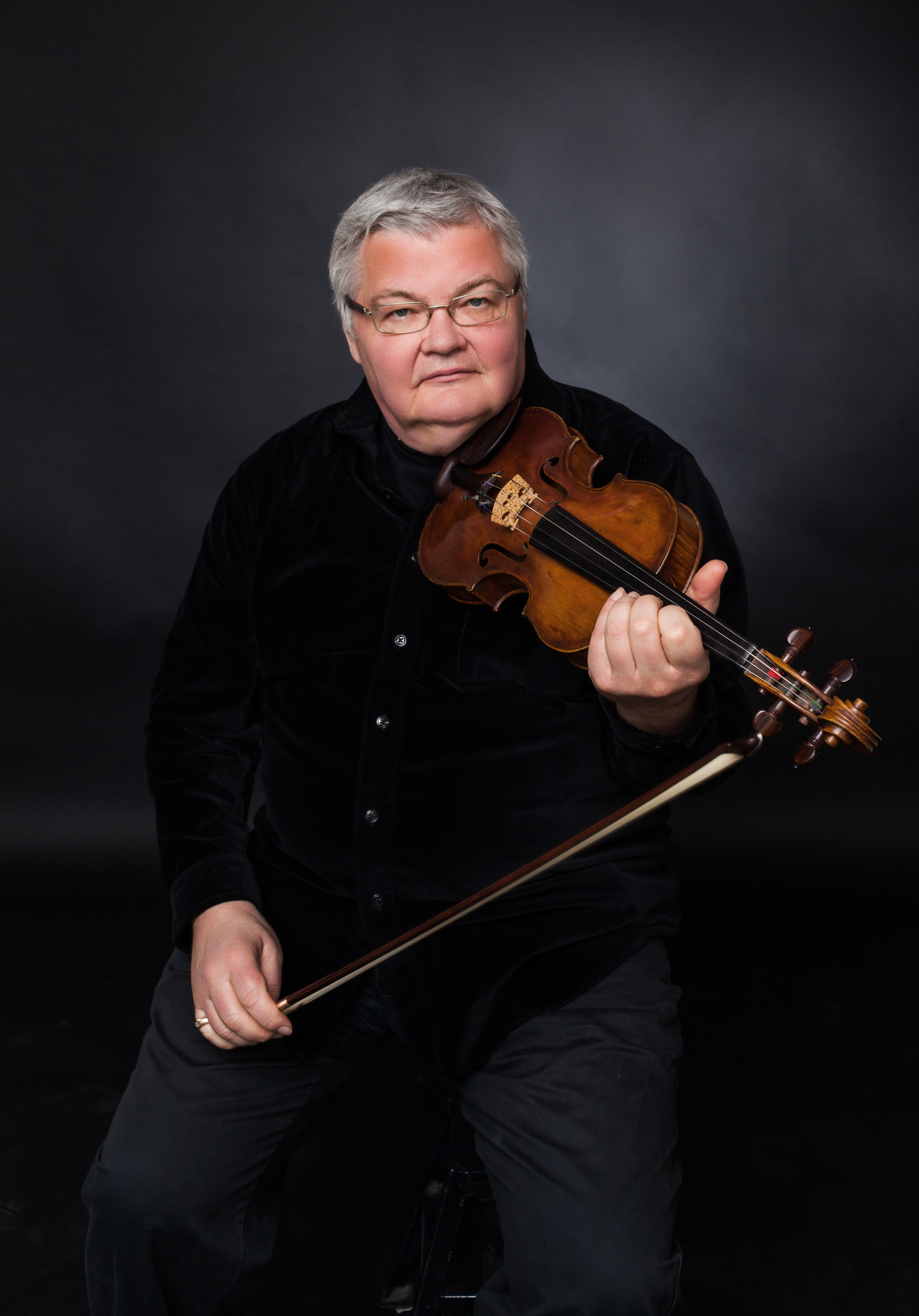
- Stadler in 2019
- Born: 20 May 1962; Leningrad, Russian SFSR, USSR
- Died: 20 April 2026 (aged 63); Bucharest, Romania
- Occupations: Violinist; conductor
- Website: www.naxos.com/person/Sergei_Stadler/1953.htm

Sergei Valentinovich Stadler (Russian: Сергей Валентинович Стадлер; 20 May 1962 – 20 April 2026) was a Russian violinist and conductor. He was Artistic Director and Chief Conductor of the Saint Petersburg Symphony Orchestra.

== Life and career ==
Stadler was born on 20 May 1962 in Leningrad. He began to study music at the age of 5. His mother, a pianist and accompanist of the St. Petersburg Conservatory, taught him how to play the piano. He started to play the violin under the guidance of his father, the violist of the Saint Petersburg Philharmonic Orchestra.

Stadler graduated from the Special Music School under the Saint Petersburg Conservatory. Then he entered the Saint Petersburg Conservatory and graduated in three and a half years due to a busy concert and tour schedule. Later he was enrolled on postgraduate course of the Moscow Conservatory, after which Stadler began teaching violin art at the Saint Petersburg Conservatory. His professors were B. Sergeev, M. Wayman, B. Gutnikov, L. Kogan, V. Tretyakov, one of his teachers was David Oistrakh. He was laureate of international music competitions:

- 1976 – Concertino Praga (1st prize);
- 1979 – Marguerite Long–Jacques Thibaud Competition (Paris) (2nd Grand Prix and Special Prize for the best performance of French music);
- 1980 – International Jean Sibelius Violin Competition (Helsinki) (2nd Prize and Special Public Award);
- 1982 – International Tchaikovsky Competition (Moscow) (1st Prize and Gold Medal).

=== International career ===
In 1984, after a tour with the Orchestra of the Saint Petersburg Philharmonic to Austria and Germany, he was recognised in Europe. 30 concerts were played, at which the music of Tchaikovsky, Brahms, Sibelius, Glazunov, Prokofiev was performed. Herbert von Karajan attended the concerts in Vienna.

During this period, Stadler playing the Stradivarius violin, owned by the State Collection. Before Stadler, David Oistrakh had played the instrument for sixteen years.

On 13 December 1985, Stadler performed a joint concert with Svyatoslav Richter at the Pushkin Museum in Moscow. The program featured Paganini's Caprices alongside Shumann's Studies after Paganini's Caprices.

At the 300th Bach anniversary, he played all his sonatas and partitas in the Thomaskirche in Leipzig in 1985. This was followed by a tour in Japan: sonatas and partitas by Bach and Paganini’s 24 Caprices. In 1986 in Germany he was awarded a critics prize of the year. During this period, he played about 150 concerts a year.

In 1987, Stadler became one of the first foreign soloists to tour China after a long break, playing in Beijing and Shanghai.

In January 1988, Stadler's first performance with an orchestra without a conductor took place because of a sad event – two days before the concert, maestro Yevgeny Mravinsky had died. However, held in the Leningrad Philharmonic, the concert marked the beginning of a series of successful projects with an orchestra without a conductor.

In October 1989 Stadler performed Beethoven's Violin concerto at three concerts with conductor Ľudovít Rajter and the Slovak Philharmonic, celebrating the 40th anniversary of its foundation.

In the early 1990s, Stadler played all of Mozart’s violin compositions with the Russian National Orchestra in Moscow and recorded Mozart’s concerts with the Saint Petersburg Philharmonic Orchestra.

=== The Paganini violin ===
A special event in the musician’s life was related to the arrival of the violin Niccolo Paganini in St. Petersburg in 1995. Stadler became an organizer of the two-day festival “The Paganini Violin in the Hermitage”, held with the support of the governments of St. Petersburg and Genoa and sponsored by the fashion house Trussardi. Also he was the first performer to be honored to play the violin “Il Cannone” Guarneri del Gesu in open concerts, after which Academician Dmitry Likhachev named him the "Russian Paganini".

The violin arrived in Saint Petersburg in 2003 for the second time. The event and concert at the Saint Petersburg Philharmonic, in which Stadler again played the Italian violinist’s instrument, were timed to coincide with the 300th anniversary of Saint Petersburg.

=== As conductor ===
From 1995, Stadler organized annual New Year’s concerts in the Concert Hall P. Tchaikovsky in Moscow. Since 1997, cycles of concerts “Music in the Hermitage Halls” have been organized in the Georgievsky, Armorial, Knights, Pavilion, Aleksandrovsky, Concert and other halls of the Winter Palace. A number of opera productions were specially made for the Hermitage Theater.

From 1998 to 2008 he was the artistic director of the International Music Festival in Perm. From 1998 to 2001 he was the Chief Conductor of the Theater of the St. Petersburg Conservatory. In 2001, he played the marathon concert “10 Beethoven Sonatas in One Evening” together with his sister Julia Stadler in Moscow, St. Petersburg, cities of Russia and Europe.

Concerts were played in the same years in Paris: concerts by Bach, Beethoven and Brahms, a concert by Tchaikovsky with Yevgeny Svetlanov. Beethoven’s chamber music was performed in castles in Germany with Wolfgang Sawallisch, Spanish music — at the Prado Museum in Madrid with pianist Gerhard Oppitz. In 2008, music by Bach and Mozart’s Requiem were played at the Tower of King David in Jerusalem.

Led by Stadler, Bernstein's Dibbuk ballet, Messiaen's Turangalîla-symphonie, operas by Hector Berlioz, Bizet's Ivan IV, and by André Grétry's Peter the Great were performed in Russia for the first time. Stadler was often the first performer of contemporary composers’ music, including concerto No. 2 by B. Tishchenko, a concerto, sonatas, and a monody “After reading Euripides” for solo violin by S. Slonimsky, and Echo-sonata for solo violin by Rodion Shchedrin.

=== Saint Petersburg Symphony Orchestra ===
Stadler was the artistic director and chief conductor of the Saint Petersburg Symphony Orchestra, an orchestra initiated by him in 2013 and regarded as one of the best orchestras in Saint Petersburg, playing about 500 concerts in Russia and abroad. The orchestra regularly performs at the Saint Petersburg and Moscow Philharmonic, the Hermitage and Alexandrinsky Theatre, the State Academic Chapel of St. Petersburg, and the Large and Small Halls of the Moscow Conservatory.

Among the concert cycles for violin and orchestra without a conductor: five concerts by Mozart, all compositions for violin and orchestra of Beethoven and Tchaikovsky. Also among the projects: Paganiniana, Spanish violin, Magyar violin, French virtuoso violin music, Wieniawski and Polish violin art, Tchaikovsky and Russian violin tradition, Offenbach-gala. In addition, the Orchestra presented opera productions including Wagner's Tannhäuser, Puccini's Turandot, Tosca and Manon Lescaut, Verdi's Il trovatore, Die Fledermaus by J. Strauss and Mozart's Le nozze di Figaro. The hallmark of the orchestra became marathons, which are held annually since the creation of the team. The following were played in one evening: six Tchaikovsky symphonies (2014), all Brahms symphonies (2015), from spring to autumn 2016 — all Mozart symphonies, and within the framework of the final marathon — 12 most iconic (2016); all Beethoven symphonies (2017), for which the orchestra was included in the Russian Book of Records as “the longest philharmonic concert with a programme from the works of one author performed by one symphony orchestra under the direction of one conductor”; all Liszt’s symphonic poems (2018).

=== Teaching and mentoring ===
From 2007, Stadler taught at the Moscow Conservatory. From 2008 to 2011 he was the Rector of the Saint Petersburg Conservatory. Since 2018, he has been leading an educational programme “The instrumental performance practice: violin” at Saint Petersburg State University. He held master classes in Russia, the USA, Germany, Norway, Poland, Israel, Finland, Spain, France, Italy, Singapore, China, Portugal and other countries. He is known to be an Honorary Professor of the Beijing and Kyiv Conservatories. An Honorary Advisor to the Chinese-Russian Association for the Study of Strategy “One Belt and One Way”.

=== Death ===
Stadler died on 20 April 2026, at the age of 63. Stadler fell ill on board a plane flying from Saint Petersburg to Istanbul, forcing the plane to make an emergency landing in Bucharest, Romania, but doctors were unable to revive him.
