= International Jean Sibelius Violin Competition =

Violinist competition

The International Jean Sibelius Violin Competition, named after Finnish composer Jean Sibelius, is a competition for violinists up to age 30. It is held every five years in Helsinki. The first competition took place in year 1965, eight years after the death of the composer to mark the centenary of the composer's birth. The competition is arranged by the Sibelius Society of Finland and the Sibelius Academy.

The competition has always had high-level competitors, and winners such as Oleg Kagan, Viktoria Mullova, and Leonidas Kavakos have become internationally performing soloists. The popularity amongst the players might be explained by the location of the competition: Finland connecting western Europe and USSR was probably considered safe enough by the Soviet authority to allow players to attend the competition.

== Structure ==
The competition has three rounds: the first round, the second round, and the final round. After each round, a number of competitors are chosen to proceed to the next round, and after the final round the finalists are ranked. In the final ranking, the performance in each round is considered as a whole. To be accepted in the competition, candidates need to send a performance sample for a competition committee for pre-selection.

The first round program consists typically works of Bach, a sonata by Mozart, and Paganini's capriccios. It is said that Bach measures readiness, Mozart measures understanding of style, and Paganini measures technical ability. The second round, often referred as the semi-finals, consists typically of a sonata for violin and piano, few pieces by Sibelius, a modern Finnish piece, and a virtuoso piece. In the final round, the finalists perform two concertos accompanied by a full symphony orchestra. One of the concertos is mandated as the Violin Concerto in D minor by Sibelius.

In 2005, 175 applications were received, 58 competitors were accepted of which 50 took part in the competition, 20 proceeded to the second round, and 8 were chosen to the final round.

== Laureates ==
Year	Gold	Silver	Bronze
1965	(Soviet Union) Oleg Kagan	(Israel) Joshua Epstein	(Soviet Union) Valery Gradov
1970	(Soviet Union) Liana Isakadze (Soviet Union) Pavel Kogan	Not awarded	(Canada) Otto Armin
1975	(Israel) Yuval Yaron	(Soviet Union) Ilya Grubert	(Romania) Eugene Sârbu
1980	(Soviet Union) Viktoria Mullova	(Soviet Union) Sergei Stadler	(United States) Andrés Cárdenes
1985	(Soviet Union) Ilya Kaler (Greece) Leonidas Kavakos	Not awarded	(Hungary) Vilmos Szabadi
1990	Not awarded	(Romania) Cristina Anghelescu	(Iceland) Sigrún Edvaldsdóttir (Japan) Akiko Tanaka
1995	(Finland) Pekka Kuusisto	(Georgia (country)) Elisabeth Batiashvili	(Japan) Madoka Sato (Denmark) Nikolaj Znaider
2000	(Armenia) Sergei Khachatryan	(Japan) Natsumi Tamai	(China) Zhi-Jiong Wang (Japan) Sayako Kusaka
2005	(Germany) Alina Pogostkina	(China) Jiafeng Chen	(South Korea) Zia-Hyunsu Shin (China) Wei Wen
2010	(Russia) Nikita Borisoglebsky	(Finland) Petteri Iivonen	(South Korea) Esther Yoo
2015	(United States) Christel Lee	(Austria) Emmanuel Tjeknavorian	(Germany) Friederike Starkloff
2022	(South Korea) In Mo Yang	(United States) Nathan Meltzer	(Ukraine) Dmytro Udovychenko
2025	(South Korea) Sueye Park	(Japan) Minami Yoshida	(United States) Claire Wells

== See also ==
- List of classical music competitions
- World Federation of International Music Competitions
