= Henri Marteau International Violin Competition =

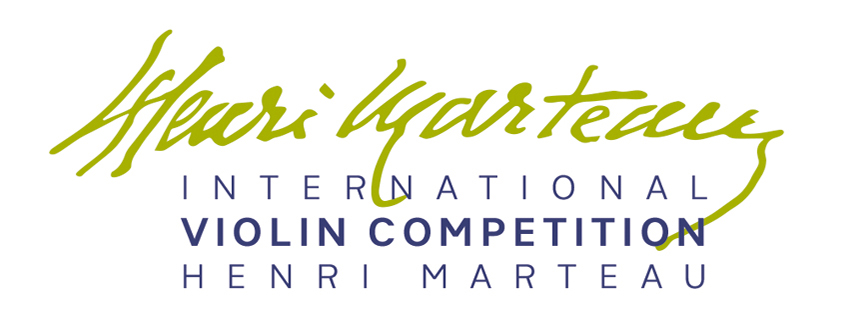
Competition logo

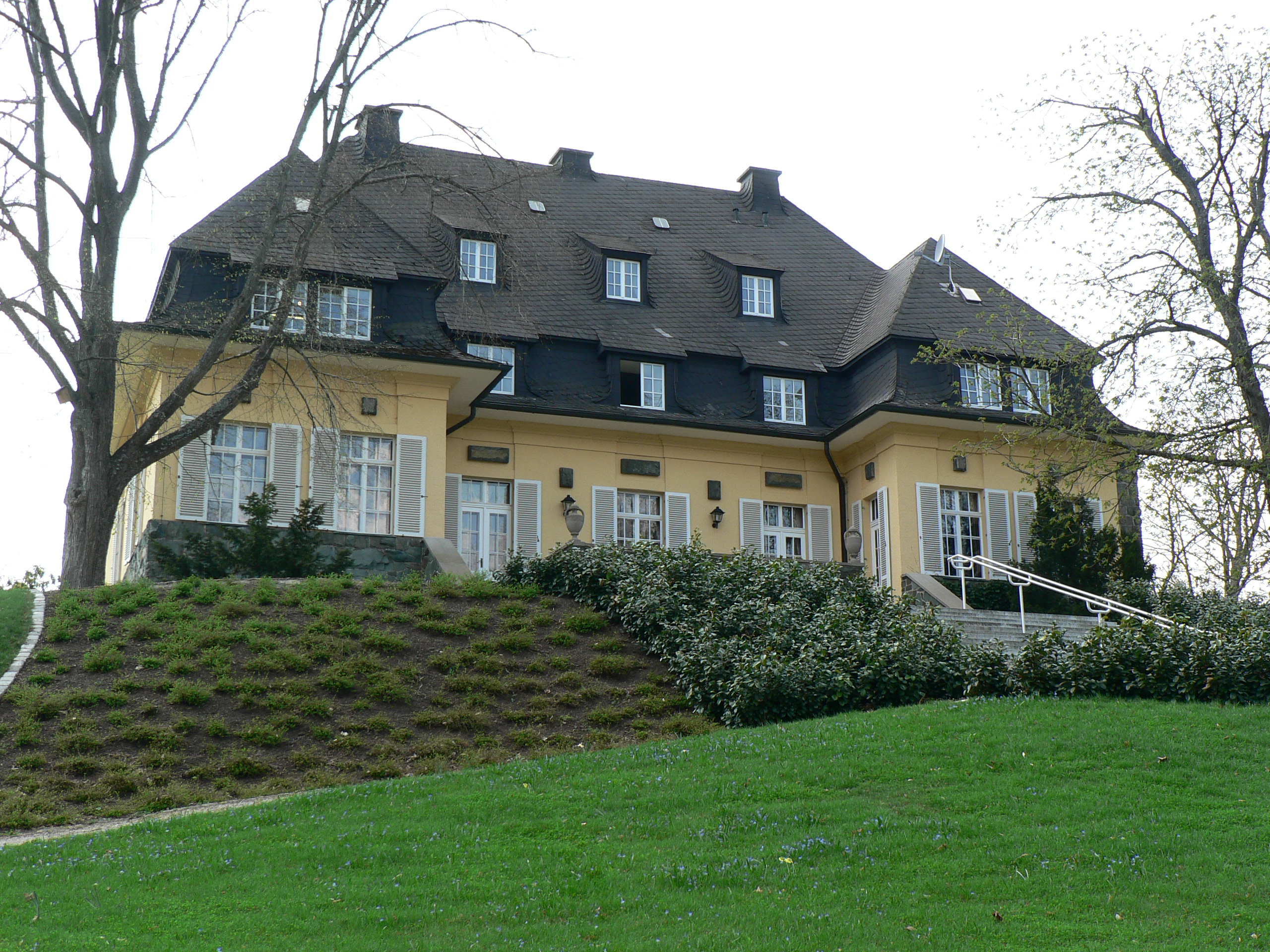
Internationale Musikbegegnungsstätte Haus Marteau in Lichtenberg, Bavaria, Germany

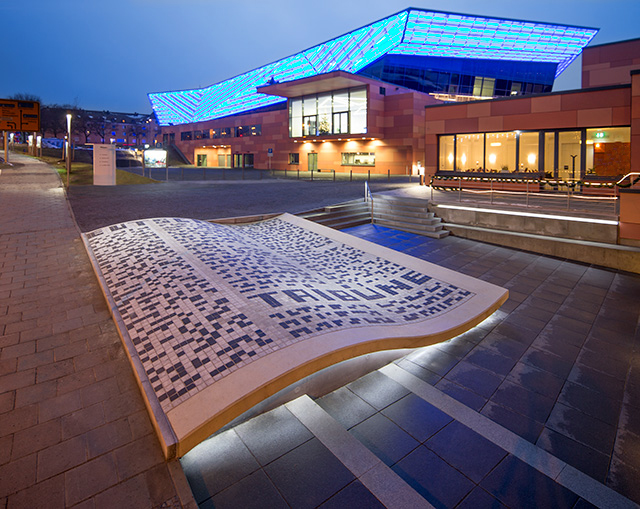
Freiheitshalle in Hof, Bavaria, Germany

The Henri Marteau International Violin Competition (German: Internationaler Violinwettbewerb Henri Marteau) is a violin competition named after the famous violinist and violin teacher Henri Marteau. It is open to violinists of all nationalities aged under 25 and takes place every three years at Haus Marteau in Lichtenberg, Bavaria and at Freiheitshalle in Hof, Bavaria, Germany.

The 7th Henri Marteau International Violin Competition, scheduled from April 26 to May 9, 2020, was cancelled due to COVID-19 pandemic. The next competition is planned for April 2026.

== Foundation, sponsorship and cooperation ==
The 125th birthday of the German-French violinist and composer Henri Marteau in 1999 inspired "Freundeskreis Haus Marteau e.V." to initiate the competition and to hold it in 2002 and 2005. In 2007, the District of Upper Franconia under its president Günther Denzler took over the sponsorship. Since then, the artistic and general coordination has been conferred to the orchestra Hofer Symphoniker. The competition became a member of the World Federation of International Music Competitions in 2012.

== Idea and promotion ==
The goals of the competition are to encourage highly skilled young violinists aged under 25 on their way to an international career and to underline the importance of musical education for young people, and to enable the exchange between young talented musicians and renowned violinists and violin professors. The competition tries also to make the name and work of Henri Marteau better known.

The competition promotes young musicians by providing cash and non-cash awards and by providing a subsequent support program which includes scholarships, the procurement of concerts and a broadcast production with Bayerischer Rundfunk which is the media partner of the competition and an ideal platform for the performances of the young musicians through an intense media coverage.

== Commissioned works ==
Since 2011, the competition commissions works as required pieces for the participants. So far, the following compositions were created:

- for 2011: Fazıl Say, Cleopatra, Op. 34 for solo violin
- for 2014: Steven Mackey, Repeated Notes for solo violin
- for 2017: Søren Nils Eichberg, Improvisation über einen Gedanken aus dem Violinkonzert von Henri Marteau for solo violin
- for 2020: Xiaogang Ye, Golden Hydrangea for solo violin

== Admission: impartial jury ==
Among discussions about 'rigged' or unfair competitions, the Henri Marteau International Violin Competition has decided in 2017 to exclude current or former students of the jury members from participation:

Students of the jury members are not eligible to participate. A student is someone who either received tuition from a jury member between October 2019 and April 2020 and/or prior to the competition for a period exceeding six months. Violinists who participate in a master class held by a jury member between January 2020 and April 2020 are not eligible to participate in the competition either.

== Jury ==
Chairman of the jury and artistic advisor of the competition is the conductor Gilbert Varga, son of the famous Hungarian violinist Tibor Varga and from 1980 to 1985 chief conductor of Hofer Symphoniker. In 2020, these jury members were engaged:

- Gilbert Varga, Hungary/Switzerland/UK, chairman
- Benjamin Beilman, USA
- Michael Frischenschlager, Austria
- Erika Geldsetzer, Germany
- Ilya Kaler, Russia/USA
- Nam Yun Kim, South Korea
- Natalia Lomeiko, Russia/UK/New Zealand
- Silvia Marcovici, Romania/France
- Kurt Sassmannshaus, Germany/USA
- Ingolf Turban, Germany

== Procedure ==
The Henri Marteau International Violin Competition opens with an opening concert performed by laureates of the former competitions at Haus Marteau in Lichtenberg.

The competition is split into three rounds. The participants play works for violin, soloistic, with piano accompaniment and in the final accompanied by orchestra. The first round and the semifinal take place at Haus Marteau in Lichtenberg. In the final, candidates play a great violin concerto together with the symphony orchestra Hofer Symphoniker at Freiheitshalle in Hof.

The competition closes with a celebratory gala concert of the laureates and Hofer Symphoniker at Freiheitshalle Hof.

== Prizes ==
The prizes to be awarded have a total amount of €35,000 (~US$40,000): 1st prize €10,000, 2nd prize €7,500, 3rd prize €5,000. Additionally, there are numerous special prizes, also supplied with money (each €1,000), scholarships for master classes, the loan of a copy of the famous Maggini violin of Henri Marteau for three years, and a broadcast production with Bayerischer Rundfunk followed by a CD release.

== Laureates ==
The laureates of the former competitions were:

2026

- 1st prize: Maya Alexandra Kasprzak, Germany/Poland/Japan
- 2nd prize: Jayden King, USA
- 3rd prize: David Martínez González, Spain
- 4th prize: Oleksii Tyshchenko, Ukraine
- 5th prize: Sasha Parker, United Kingdom
- 6th prize: Ziwen Wang, China

2023

- 1st prize: Hawijch Elders, Netherlands
- 2nd prize: Xunyue Zhang, China
- 3rd prize: Julian Walder, Austria

2017

- 1st prize: Lorenz Chen, Germany
- 2nd prize: Yukino Nakamura, Japan
- 3rd prize: Stepan Starikov, Russia

2014

- 1st prize: Fedor Rudin, France/Russia
- 2nd prize: Misako Akama, Japan
- 3rd prize: Minkyum Kim, South Korea

2011

- 1st prize: Tobias Feldmann, Germany
- 2nd prize: Edouard Mätzener, Switzerland
- 3rd prize: Ji Young Lim, South Korea

2008

- 1st prize: Andrei Baranov, Russia
- 2nd prize: Alexandra Conunova-Dumortier, Moldavia
- 3rd prize: Byol Kang, Germany

2005

Category A (born after December 31, 1987)

- 1st prize: Danae Papamatthäou-Matschke, Greece
- 2nd prize: Paula Šūmane, Latvia
- 3rd prize: Sarah Christian, Germany
- 4th prize: Nizan Bartana, Israel

Category B (born between January 1, 1980 and December 31, 1987)

- 1st prize: Stefan Tarara, Germany
- 2nd prize: Rebekka Hartmann, Germany
- 3rd prize: Sang-Mee Huh, South Korea
- 4th prize: Zsolt-Tihamer Visontay, Hungary

2002

Category A (born after December 31, 1984)

- 1st prize: Yuki Manuela Janke, Germany/Japan
- 2nd prize: Jung Yoon Yang, South Korea
- 3rd prize: Adam Banda, Hungary

Category B (born between January 1, 1977 and December 31, 1984)

- 1st prize: Andreas Janke, Germany/Japan
- 2nd prize: Yoon Shin Song, South Korea
- 3rd prize: Lucja Madziar, Poland

== Honorary Committee ==
- Christoph Adt, president of Hochschule für Musik Nürnberg, artistic advisor of Internationale Musikbegegnungsstätte Haus Marteau
- Ulrike Brett-Einsiedel, chairwoman of Freundeskreis Haus Marteau e.V.
- Thomas Goppel, president of Bayerischer Musikrat
- Heidrun Piwernetz, president of district government of Upper Franconia, chairwoman of board of trustees/Oberfrankenstiftung
- Henry Schramm, president of district parliament of Upper Franconia
- Bernd Sibler, Bavarian state minister for science and arts
