= Yuval Yaron =

Israeli-born American violinist

- יובל יראון
- Born: Petah Tikva, Israel
- Education: Indiana University Bloomington
- Occupations: Violin Professor, University of California, Santa Barbara
- Awards: International Jean Sibelius Violin Competition (1975) 1st Prize; Paganini Competition (1973) 2nd Prize

Yuval Yaron (Hebrew: יובל יראון; born 1953 in Petah Tikva, Israel) is an Israel-born violinist living in the United States. In 1975, he won the International Jean Sibelius Violin Competition in Helsinki, Finland. Since 2001, Yaron has been professor of University of California, Santa Barbara. Before that, he taught for some 20 years at the Indiana University Bloomington.

At the age of 16, Yuval Yaron debuted with the Israel Philharmonic Orchestra. In 1973 he received the 2nd prize at the Paganini Competition in Italy, and two years later won the Sibelius Competition in Helsinki. By that time he was already residing in the USA, taking lessons from Josef Gingold and Jascha Heifetz. Yuval Yaron has performed with a number of symphony orchestras particularly in Europe, North America, and his homeland Israel. In addition, he has given recitals in cities such as Tel Aviv, Chicago, Boston, Los Angeles, Toronto, Basel, Hanover, Helsinki and Reykjavík.

Yaron has made recordings of many solo works for violin, such as Bach’s sonatas and partitas and Eugène Ysaÿe's six violin sonatas.
