= Ivan Monighetti =

Russian cellist and conductor

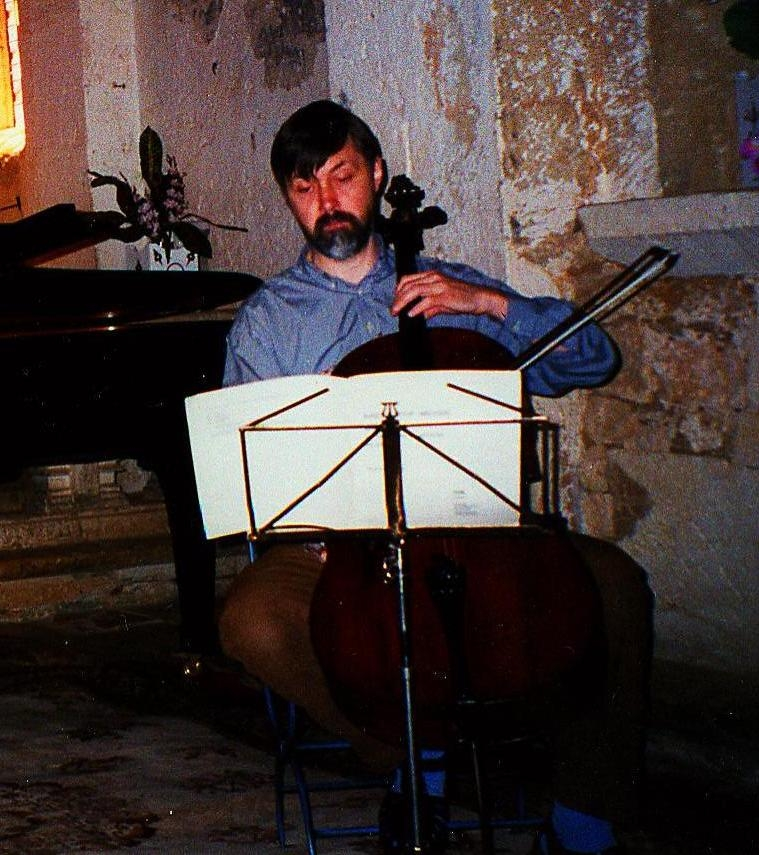
- Ivan Monighetti at a rehearsal
- Born: 1948
- Occupation(s): Cellist, conductor

Ivan Monighetti is a Russian cellist and conductor of Swiss descent.

== Biography ==
Ivan Monighetti, described by Krzysztof Penderecki as a “phenomenal cellist” was Mstislav Rostropovich's last student at the Moscow Conservatory.As a sought-after performer, pedagogue and conductor Ivan Monighetti is one of the most versatile personalities in the classical music world today. For more than four decades he has enjoyed a career, which has taken him throughout Europe, to America, Japan and Korea. Besides outstanding interpretations of the classical masterpieces he has become known for numerous premieres of modern compositions His appearances at major contemporary music festivals and friendships with composers such as Gubaidulina, Penderecki, Meyer, Szimanski, Tan Dun, Xenakis, Schnittke, Knaifel, Silvestrov, Ali-Zadeh, Rob Zuidam, Kelterborn have brought him a wide reputation in the field of modern music. Many works written especially for him are now part of the established cello repertoire.

As a soloist he has performed with many of the world's great orchestras and conductors, including Kurt Masur, Charles Dutoit, Mariss Jansons, Valery Gergiev, Christoph Eschenbach, Gennady Rozhdestvensky, Andrei Boreyko, Muhai Tang, Krzysztof Penderecki, Mstislav Rostropovich, Dmitri Kitaenko, Hans Fonk, Antony Wit, Milan Horvat.

He first appeared as a conductor in 1998 at the English Haydn Festival where he conducted the Haydn's Nelson Mass and during both 1999 and 2000 was re-invited numerous times for a principal conductor work. He also founded Camerata Boccherini orchestra with which he toured in France, the Netherlands, Poland, Estonia and Russia.

Currently he is a professor at the Escuela Superior Reina Sofia in Madrid and Doctor Honoris Causa of the Music Academy in Krakow. At the Musik-Akademie Basel during nearly 30 years he trained and mentored several generations of cellists. His students include such renowned soloists as Sol Gabetta, Kian Soltani, Hayoung Choi, Nicolas Altstaedt, Emil Rovner and Asier Polo.

His discography includes over 40 recordings. He recorded for Erato, Pan classics, ECM, Harmonia Mundi, Orfeo, Wergo, Chant du monde, Berlin classics, DUX, Pro Viva, Polskie Nagrania, Melodia. His latest releases include Works by Alexander Knaifel (ECM), Haydn`s Cello Concertos and Menuets (DUX), (on both CD`s he appears as cellist and conductor) and Beethoven`s Cello Sonatas.He was awarded Frederic prize for his recording of the six Suites for cello solo by J.S.Bach and Diapason d’or for his CD 20th century music for cello solo. He is featured on Swiss TV in Ritratto a Monighetti and Monighetti: Storie di famiglia
