= In Mo Yang =

South Korean violinist (born 1995)

- Born: 26 July 1995 (age 31)
- Education: Korean National Institute for the Gifted in Arts; Korean National University of Arts; New England Conservatory
- Occupation: violinist

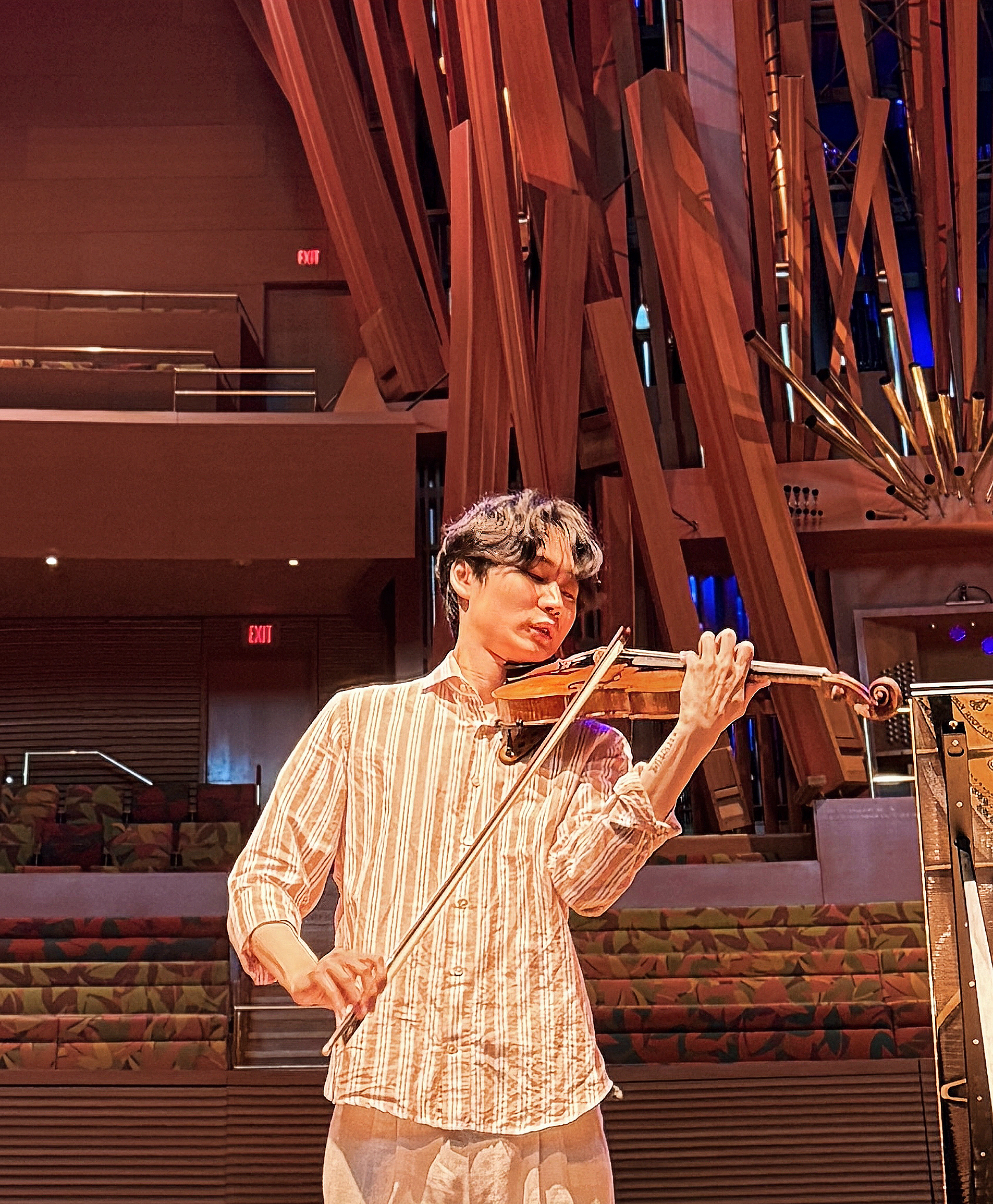
Yang at Disney Concert Hall in Los Angeles.

In Mo Yang (Korean: 양인모; born July 26, 1995), also known as Inmo Yang, is a South Korean violinist. He is the first prize winner of the 54th edition of the International Paganini Competition in Genoa, Italy in 2015 and the first prize winner of the Sibelius Competition in Helsinki, Finland in 2022. He is also the second prize winner in the senior division of the 2014 Yehudi Menuhin International Competition for Young Violinists in Austin, Texas. In April 2016, he had made a debut at Carnegie Hall at the Weill Recital Hall with the Danish National Symphony conducted by Fabio Luisi.

== Biography ==
In Mo Yang was born into a Korean family in 1995 having debuted a recital at age 11 on the Ewon Prodigy Series in Seoul, Korea, following that with a debut with the KBS Symphony Orchestra at the age of 15. In Mo graduated from the Korean National Institute for the Gifted in Arts in February 2011 having then been admitted into the Korean National University of Arts as a prodigy in music. In Mo is also a graduate of the New England Conservatory, where he studied with Miriam Fried and pursued a Bachelor of Music degree. He is currently pursuing a master's degree with Antje Weithaas at the Hochschule für Musik "Hanns Eisler" in Berlin.

In Mo has performed with the NDR Radiophilharmonie, Russian Symphony Orchestra, Brazilian Symphony Orchestra, Austin Symphony Orchestra, Boston Classical Orchestra, Longwood Symphony Orchestra, Boston Philharmonic Youth Orchestra, Central Aichi Symphony Orchestra, Danish National Symphony, KBS Symphony Orchestra and the Korean Symphony Orchestra.

As of July 2021, In Mo currently plays on the c. 1718 "Bostonian" Antonio Stradivarius violin loaned to him by a private donor. Yang has also played on a c. 1690 violin by Giovanni Tononi, a 1705/1706 Antonio Stradivarius and the Il Cannone by Guarneri 'Del Gesu' once owned by the famed Niccolò Paganini.

== Awards and appearances ==
- 2012: Fourth prize, International Joseph Joachim Violin Competition
- 2013: Top honors, Munetsugu Angel Violin Competition
- 2014: Second prize winner, Senior Division, Yehudi Menuhin International Competition for Young Violinists
- 2014: First prize winner, CAG Victor Elmaleh Competition
- 2015: First prize winner, International Paganini Competition
- 2016: Carnegie Hall debut at Weill Recital Hall
- 2022: First prize winner, International Jean Sibelius Violin Competition
