= Leonidas Kavakos =

Greek violin virtuoso and conductor

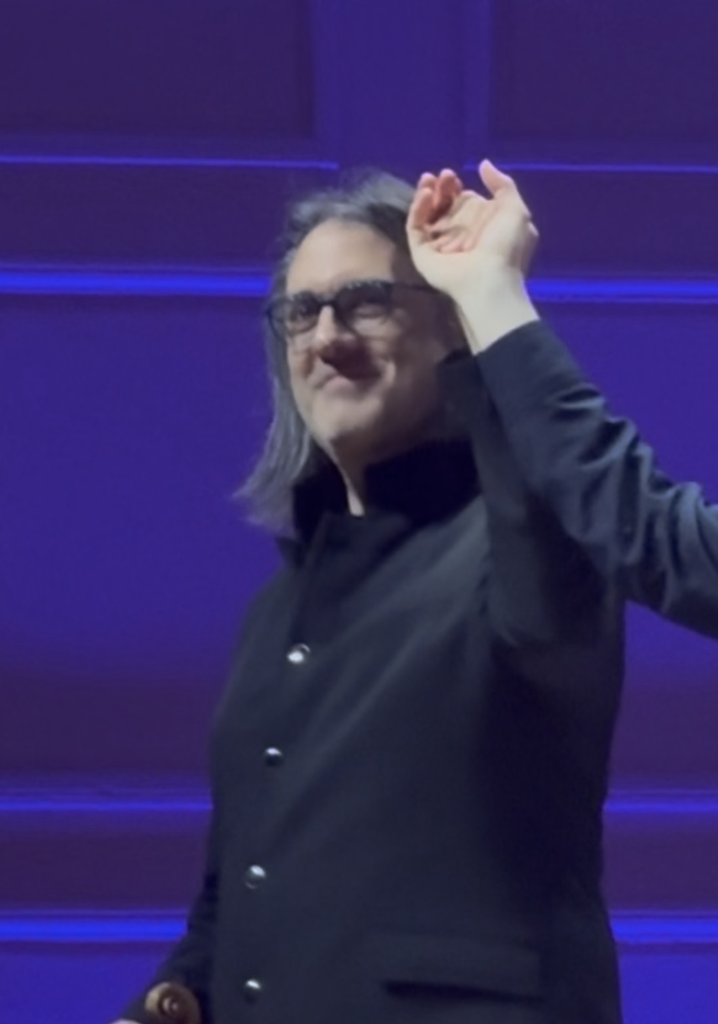
- Kavakos in 2025
- Born: 30 October 1967 (age 58); Athens, Greece
- Occupations: Violinist; Conductor

Leonidas Kavakos (Greek: Λεωνίδας Καβάκος; born 30 October 1967) is a Greek violinist and conductor. He has won several international violin competition prizes, including the Sibelius, Paganini, Naumburg, and Indianapolis competitions. He is an Onassis Foundation scholar. He has also recorded for record labels such as Sony/BMG and BIS. As a conductor, he was an artistic director of the Camerata Salzburg and has been a guest conductor of the London Symphony Orchestra and Boston Symphony Orchestra.

== Beginnings ==
Born in Athens into a musical family, Kavakos first learned to play the violin when he was five and later enrolled in the Hellenic Conservatory, studying with Stelios Kafantaris. An Onassis Foundation scholarship enabled him to attend master classes with Josef Gingold at Indiana University. He made his concert debut at the Athens Festival in 1984. In 1985, he won the International Sibelius Competition in Helsinki and in 1986 won silver medal in the Indianapolis International Violin Competition. He also took first prizes at the Naumburg Competition in New York (1988) and the Paganini Violin Competition (1988).

== Performances ==
=== North America ===
His United States debut was in 1986, and, in the following year, he gave recitals at venues across the country. Kavakos now tours North America annually and works with numerous major orchestras, including the Chicago, and Montreal Symphony Orchestras.

=== Europe ===
In Europe, following his competition win in Helsinki, Kavakos' reputation spread quickly. He now works extensively in major concert halls across the continent, working with world-class orchestras, including the Berlin Philharmonic, Royal Concertgebouw Orchestra, London Symphony Orchestra and the Vienna Philharmonic. He has appeared at festivals such as the Verbier Festival, Salzburg Festival, the Lucerne Festival, and the Stars of White Nights Festival. In 1991, the original version of Sibelius' Violin Concerto in D minor (mostly unknown to the world at large until then) was permitted a performance and a recording by Sibelius' heirs on the BIS record label; both original and final versions were played by Kavakos and conducted by Osmo Vänskä. He has appeared throughout the UK with numerous orchestras, starting in 1992 with his performance of Igor Stravinsky's Violin Concerto at the BBC Proms.

=== Asia ===
Kavakos made a highly successful Japanese debut in 1988 including a recital at Tokyo's Casals Hall and has since toured Japan with the English Chamber Orchestra and given concerts with the Tokyo Metropolitan Symphony Orchestra and the New Japan Philharmonic.

He was called "The Violinists' Violinist" by The Strad magazine.

In 2014, he was invited to perform in the 42nd Hong Kong Arts Festival.

== Recordings ==
Having won the Sibelius Competition, Kavakos went on to win another coveted distinction, once again working on Sibelius. He won the 1991 Gramophone Concerto of the Year Award for the world premiere release on the BIS label of the Sibelius Violin Concerto in both its final version and in the original 1903/04 version. He has made various other recordings for Delos and Finlandia Records with works by composers such as Debussy, Paganini, Schubert, Tchaikovsky, Wieniawski, and Ysaÿe. In 2006 as soloist and conductor of the Camerata Salzburg, he recorded the five violin concertos and one symphony by Mozart for Sony/BMG. For his recording as conductor and soloist of the Mendelssohn Violin Concerto (Op. 64) with the Camerata, he was awarded with the ECHO-Klassik 2009 prize in the category "Recording of the Year – Concerts – 19th Century – Violin".

== Chamber music ==
Kavakos is a keen chamber music performer, and presents his own chamber music festival annually in his home town of Athens as well as performing in many international festivals.

== Conducting ==
Kavakos has worked extensively as a conductor. He was announced principal guest artist of the Camerata Salzburg in 2001 and performed with them as a soloist and conductor.

In 2007, he was designated Camerata Salzburg's artistic director, succeeding Sir Roger Norrington. On 1 July 2009, he announced his resignation from his position as artistic director that fall, explaining that he could not perform as artistic director in the face of ongoing turmoil in the ensemble's management (seven complete changes in eight years), a recent motion of no confidence in the current management passed by the ensemble's musicians, as well as the failure of musicians & staff to inform him of that vote, suggesting communication had completely broken down.

Kavakos has conducted the New York Philharmonic, Houston Symphony, Dallas Symphony, Gürzenich Orchester, Vienna Symphony, Orchestre Philharmonique de Radio France, Chamber Orchestra of Europe, Maggio Musicale Fiorentino, Filarmonica Teatro La Fenice, and the Danish National Symphony Orchestra.

== Instruments ==
As of 2017, Kavakos performs on the "Willemotte" Stradivarius of 1734, which he acquired from London and New York-based dealer and expert, Florian Leonhard. Kavakos had been playing the "Abergavenny" Stradivarius of 1724 since February 2010. He sold the "Falmouth" Stradivarius of 1692, and a 1782 violin by Giovanni Battista Guadagnini (Torino). Kavakos now owns only the Willemotte and three modern violins, including one, as of 4 September 2010, by Florian Leonhard.

== Recent albums ==
Year	Title	Collaborators
2017	Brahms: The Piano Trios	Yo-Yo Ma, Emanuel Ax
2019	Beethoven: Violin Concerto, Op. 61, Septet, Op. 20 & Variations on Folk Songs, Op. 105 & 107	Bavarian Radio Symphony Orchestra
2020	Tchaikovsky: Souvenir de Florence, Op. 70, TH 118 (Live from the 2013 Verbier Festival)	Lisa Batiashvilii, Antoine Tamestit, Blythe Teh Engstroem, Gautier Capucon, Stephan Koncz
2022	Bach: Sei Solo	
2022	Beethoven for Three: Symphonies Nos. 2 and 5	Yo-Yo Ma, Emanuel Ax
2024	Bach: Violin Concertos	The Apollon Ensemble
