= Montreal International Music Competition =

Montreal International Music Competition was a well-known international competition for classical pianists, violinists and opera singers, founded in 1963 and abandoned in 1997.

== Main laureates ==
The main laureates of each edition are:

- 1965: Piano: 1st Jean-Claude Pennetier, France, and Albert Lotto, USA
- 1966: Violin: 1st Vladimir Lancman (Landsman), USSR; 2nd Hidetaro Suzuki, Japan, and Gueorgui Balev, Bulgaria
- 1967: Voice: 1st Marina Krilovici, Rumania, and Yury Mazurok, USSR
- 1968: Piano: 1st Garrick Ohlsson, USA; 2nd Peter Rösel, East Germany
- 1969: Violin: 1st Vladimir Spivakov, USSR; 2nd Oleg Krissa, USSR, and Gidon Kremer, USSR
- 1970: Voice: 2nd Maurice Brown, Canada (no 1st awarded)
- 1971: Piano: 2nd Peter Basquin, USA (no 1st awarded)
- 1972: Violin: 1st Ruben Agaronian, USSR; 2nd Mikhaïl Bezverhny, USSR
- 1973: Voice: 1st Gheorgue Emil Crasnaru, Rumania; 2nd Makvala Kasrashvili, USSR
- 1975: Violin: 2nd Dong-Suk Kang, Korea, and Yuval Yaron, Israel (no 1st awarded)
- 1976: Piano: 1st Eteri Andjaparidze, USSR; 2nd Nicolaï Demidenko, USSR, Naüm Grubert, USSR, and Gerhard Oppitz, West Germany
- 1977: Voice: 2nd William Parker, USA, and Louise Wohlafka, USA (no 1st awarded)
- 1979: Violin: 1st Peter Zazofsky, USA; 2nd Mihaela Martin, Rumania
- 1980: Piano: 1st Ivo Pogorelic, Yugloslavia; 2nd Christopher O'Riley, USA, and Vladimir Ovchinnikov, USSR
- 1981: Voice: 2nd Judith Nicosia, USA (no 1st awarded)
- 1983: Violin: 2nd Chin Kim, Korea (no 1st awarded)
- 1984: Piano: 1st Ekaterina Sarantseva, USSR; 2nd Yuri Rozum, USSR
- 1985: Voice: 2nd Sandra Graham, Canada, and Andreas Scheibner, East Germany (no 1st awarded)
- 1987: Violin: 1st Dmitri Berlinski, USSR; 2nd Catherine Cho, USA, and Alexander Simionescu, USA
- 1988: Piano: 1st Angela Cheng; 2nd Bernd Glemser, West Germany
- 1989: Voice: 2nd Steffanie Pearce, USA, and John Koch, USA (no 1st awarded)
- 1991: Violin: 2nd Hiroko Suzuki, Japan (no 1st awarded)
