= Violin Concerto (Sibelius) =

Concerto in three movements by Jean Sibelius

- by Jean Sibelius
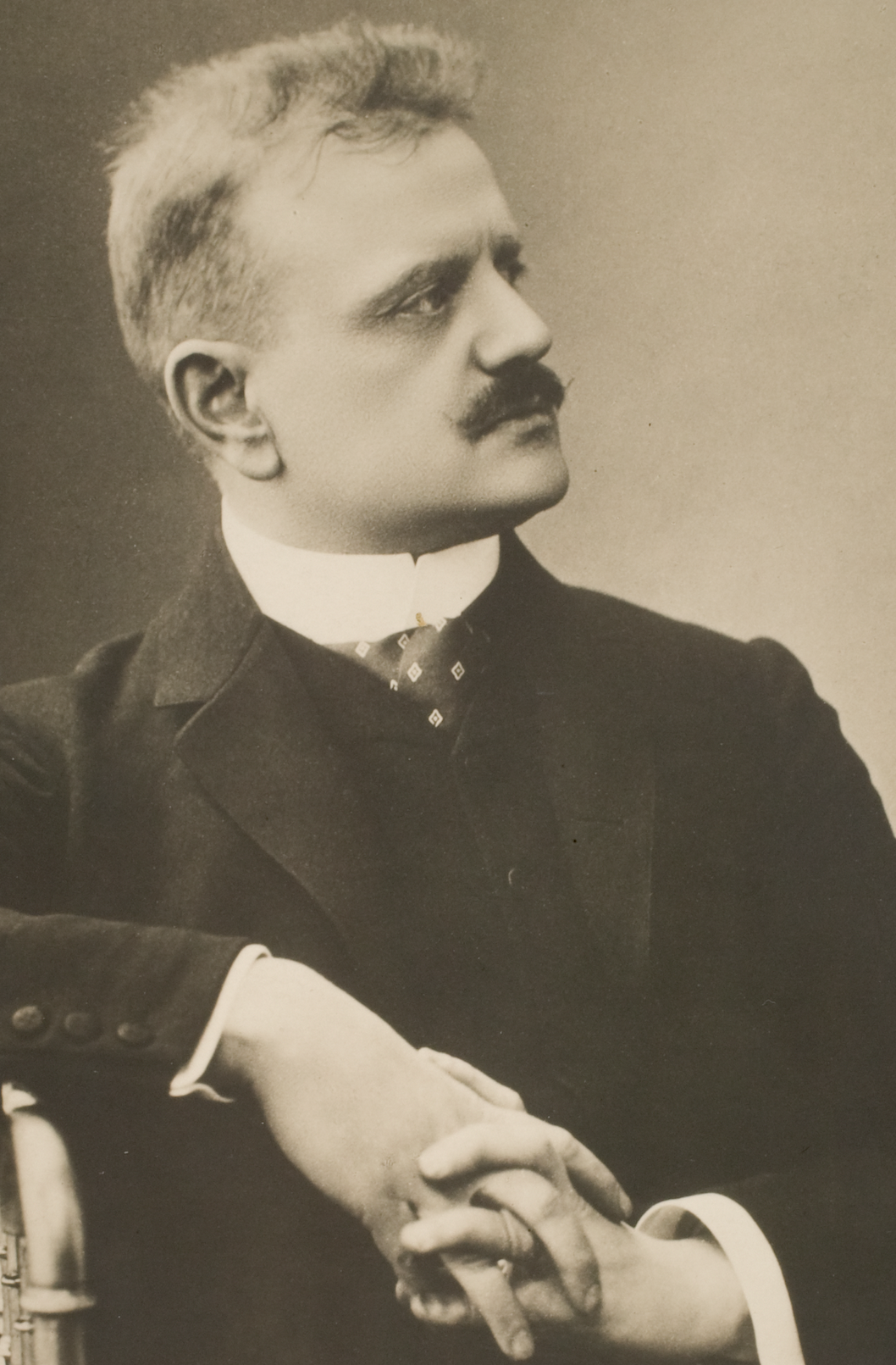
- The composer (c. 1905)
- Key: D minor
- Opus: 47
- Composed: 1903–1904, rev. 1905
- Publisher: Lienau (1906)
- Duration: 38 mins. (orig. 40 mins.)
- Movements: 3

Premiere
- Date: 8 February 1904
- Location: Helsinki, Grand Duchy of Finland
- Conductor: Jean Sibelius
- Performers: Helsinki Philharmonic Society; Victor Nováček (violin)

The Violin Concerto in D minor, Op. 47 of Jean Sibelius, originally composed in 1904 and revised in 1905, is the only concerto by Sibelius. It is symphonic in scope and included an extended cadenza for the soloist that takes on the role of the development section in the first movement.

== History ==
Sibelius originally dedicated the concerto to the noted violinist Willy Burmester, who promised to play the concerto in Berlin. For financial reasons, however, Sibelius decided to premiere it in Helsinki, and since Burmester was unavailable to travel to Finland, Sibelius engaged Victor Nováček (1873–1914), a Hungarian violin pedagogue of Czech origin who was then teaching at the Helsinki Institute of Music (now the Sibelius Academy).

The initial version of the concerto premiered on 8 February 1904, with Sibelius conducting. Sibelius had barely finished the work in time for the premiere, giving Nováček little time to prepare, and the piece was of such difficulty that it would have sorely tested even a player of much greater skill. Given these factors, it was unwise of Sibelius to choose Nováček, who was a teacher and not a recognised soloist, and it is not surprising that the premiere was a disaster. However, Nováček was not the poor player he is sometimes painted as. He was the first violinist hired by Martin Wegelius for the Helsinki Institute, and in 1910 he participated in the premiere of Sibelius's string quartet Voces intimae, which received favourable reviews.

Sibelius withheld this version from publication and made substantial revisions. He deleted much material he felt did not work. The new version premiered on 19 October 1905 with Richard Strauss conducting the Berlin Court Orchestra. Sibelius was not in attendance. Willy Burmester was again asked to be the soloist, but he was again unavailable, so the performance went ahead without him, the orchestra's leader Karel Halíř stepping into the soloist's shoes. Burmester was so offended that he refused ever to play the concerto, and Sibelius re-dedicated it to the Hungarian "wunderkind" Ferenc von Vecsey, who was aged 12 at the time. Vecsey championed the work, first performing it when he was only 13, although he could not adequately cope with its extraordinary technical demands.

The concerto was given a British premiere on 1 October 1907 at the Promenade Concerts, conducted by Henry Wood at Queen's Hall.

The initial version was noticeably more demanding on the advanced skills of the soloist. The revised version still requires a high level of technical facility on the part of the soloist. The original is somewhat longer than the revised, including themes that did not survive the revision. Certain parts, like the very beginning, most of the third movement, and parts of the second, have not changed at all. The cadenza in the first movement is exactly the same for the violin part.

=== Recent history of the 1904 version ===
The Sibelius family has granted occasional permission for a small number of orchestras and soloists to perform the original 1904 version in public. The first such documented authorisation was for a September 1990 performance by Manfred Gräsbeck, the Lahti Symphony Orchestra and Osmo Vänskä. In January 1991, BIS made a commercial recording of the original 1904 version, with Leonidas Kavakos, the Lahti Symphony Orchestra and Vänskä. Subsequent performances of the 1904 version have been as follows:

- 3 September 2015: Elina Vähälä, Finnish Radio Symphony Orchestra, Hannu Lintu (conductor)
- 28 November 2015: Maxim Vengerov, Queensland Symphony Orchestra, Nicholas Carter (conductor)
- 5 June 2016: Maxim Vengerov, Oxford Philharmonic Orchestra, Marios Papadopoulos (conductor) (The Sheldonian Theatre, Oxford, UK)
- 6 June 2016: Maxim Vengerov, Oxford Philharmonic Orchestra, Marios Papadopoulos (conductor) (Barbican Centre, London)
- 5 and 6 October 2016: Maxim Vengerov, Orchestre de Paris, Christoph Eschenbach (conductor).
- 7 and 8 January 2022: Elina Vähälä, Minnesota Orchestra, Osmo Vänskä (conductor)
- 30 and 31 March 2023: Elina Vähälä, Seoul Philharmonic Orchestra, Osmo Vänskä (conductor)

In 2020, Robert Lienau Musikverlag produced the first published version of the original 1904 version of the Violin Concerto.

== Music ==
This is the only concerto that Sibelius wrote, though he composed several other smaller-scale pieces for solo instrument and orchestra, including the six Humoresques for violin and orchestra.

One noteworthy feature of the work is the way in which an extended cadenza for the soloist takes on the role of the development section in the sonata form first movement. Much of the violin writing is purely virtuosic, but even the most showy passages alternate with the melodic.

This concerto is generally symphonic in scope, departing completely from the often lighter, "rhythmic" accompaniments of many other concertos. Donald Tovey regarded the concerto as an unparalleled example of this styling and wrote that he had "not met a more original, a more masterly, and a more exhilarating work than the Sibelius violin concerto".

=== Scoring ===
The concerto is scored for solo violin, 2 flutes, 2 oboes, 2 clarinets, 2 bassoons, 4 horns, 2 trumpets, 3 trombones, timpani and strings.

=== Movements ===
External audio
- Performed by Isaac Stern with the Philadelphia Orchestra under Eugene Ormandy
- I. Allegro moderato
- II. Adagio di molto
- III. Allegro, ma non tanto

Like most concertos, the work is in three movements:

1. Allegro moderato (with many tempo changes throughout) in D minor, in 2/2 mostly, with some sections in 6/4 and 4/4 time
2. Adagio di molto in B♭ major and in 4/4 time
3. Allegro, ma non tanto in D major and in 3/4 time

==== I. Allegro moderato ====
The first movement opens with a cushion of pianissimo strings pulsating gently. The soloist then enters with a first theme featuring a G-A-D motif, which is briefly echoed by a clarinet solo.

After a passionate high F and an unexpected E♭ major chord, the soloist introduces a new, dark theme on the G string. The lower woodwinds and timpani accompany the violinist in several runs. Cadenza-like arpeggios, double stops, and more runs from the soloist are accompanied by more woodwind restatements of the theme. The soloist then plays a relatively brief cadenza featuring rapid sixteenth notes and quick string crossings. After an ascending scale from the solo violin in broken octaves, the strings then enter in a symphonic manner, announcing the second half of the exposition material in. The music is then carried on by the bassoons and clarinets before another entrance of the soloist.

The violin plays a gentle, ascending motif, followed by a quick arpeggio which ascends into a heroic theme in B♭ minor, culminating in affettuoso octaves. The soloist softly soars in a slow, D♭ major arpeggio which leads into a tender, winding broken-octave passage built upon the heroic theme. These octaves build to a trill on one string with the winding figure played articulately on another. Another forceful orchestral tutti leads to an extensive violin cadenza. The cadenza occupies the developmental portion of the movement and ends just before the recapitulation, the heroic theme being played by the violin a semitone higher than before, in B minor. Returning to D minor, a long trill from the soloist suddenly transitions into the virtuosic coda, requiring remarkable skill in octaves, rapid and wide shifts to harmonics, and ricochet bowing. An upward cascade of double stops, a chord with a fingered harmonic, and a strong final D conclude the first movement.

==== II. Adagio di molto ====
The second movement is very lyrical. A short theme from the clarinets and oboes leads into the main theme, played by the solo violin over pizzicato strings. Dissonant accompaniments by the brass dominate the first part of the song-like movement.

After, the orchestra enters boldly with the introductory theme in a tempestuous mood. Suddenly, the solo violin enters with plaintive, double-stopped, polyrhythmic phrases. The passage develops into continuous triplet-sixteenth notes, which lead into a building trill section. After a climactic high C and B♭, the music relaxes, leading to graceful upward scales in broken octaves by the violinist. Soon after, the solo violin increases the tension once again and finally comes to the movement's main climax, which is essentially a variation of the first theme.

Then, the solo violin restates the first theme and, playing gently grace-noted figures, ends with a light float up to an all-serene harmonic D. Soft B♭ major chords by the orchestra accompany this tranquil close to the movement.

==== III. Allegro, ma non tanto ====
Tovey describes the final movement as a "polonaise for polar bears". It opens with four bars of rhythmic percussion, with the lower strings playing 'eighth note – sixteenth note – sixteenth note' figures. The violin boldly enters with the first theme on the G string. This first section offers a complete and brilliant display of violin gymnastics with up-bow staccato double-stops and a run with rapid string-crossing, then octaves, that leads into the first tutti.

The second theme in G minor is taken up by the orchestra and is almost like a waltz; the violin takes up the same theme in variations, with arpeggios and double-stops. Another short section concluding with a run of octaves makes a bridge into a recapitulation of the first theme.

The second theme is restated, this time in D minor, before leading to the final section introduced by the clarinets and low brass. A passage of harmonics in the violin precedes a sardonic passage of chords and slurred double-stops. A passage of broken octaves leads to an incredibly heroic few lines of double-stops and leaping octaves. A brief orchestral tutti comes before the violin leads the concerto to the finish with a D major scale up, returning down in flatted supertonic (then repeated). A flourish of ascending slur-separate sixteenth notes, punctuated by a resolute D from the violin and orchestra, concludes the concerto.

== Notable Performances ==
After performing the Concerto in Helsinki in 1949, Ida Haendel received a letter from Sibelius. He wrote: "You played it masterfully in every respect. . . . I congratulate myself that my concerto has found an interpreter of your rare standard."
