= Ilya Grubert =

Latvian violinist

Ilya Haimovich Grubert (Russian: Илья Хаймович Груберт, Latvian: Iļja Grūberts; born 13 May 1954) is a Latvian classical violinist and professor.

== Biography ==
Born in Riga, Grubert began his violin studies at the Emīls Dārziņš Music School. He later studied at the Moscow Central Music School and the Moscow Conservatory with Yuri Yankelevich, Zinaida Gilels, and Leonid Kogan. He won second prize at the Sibelius Competition in 1975, first prize in the Paganini Competition in 1977, and gold in the violin category of the Tchaikovsky Competition in 1978.

Since then Grubert has had a distinguished career and performed with orchestras such as the Moscow Philharmonic, St. Petersburg Philharmonic, the Russian State Orchestra, Dresden Staatskapelle, Rotterdam Philharmonic, and the Netherlands Philharmonic. He has worked with conductors such as Mariss Jansons, Gennady Rozhdestvensky, Voldemar Nelson, Mark Wigglesworth, and Maxim Shostakovich.

Now Grubert lives in the Netherlands and is a professor at the Amsterdam Conservatory and at the University of Minho.
