= Râul Alb (Dâmbovița) =

- Location within Romania

Location
- Country: Romania
- Counties: Dâmbovița County
- Villages: Râu Alb de Sus, Râu Alb de Jos, Bărbulețu, Pietrari

Physical characteristics
- Source: 30 km (19 mi)
- Mouth: Dâmbovița
  - coordinates: 45.0417°N 25.2625°E
- Basin size: 97 km^{2} (37 sq mi)

Basin features
- Progression: Dâmbovița→ Argeș→ Danube→ Black Sea
- Tributaries
  - left: Valea Puiușului, Horoaici
  - right: Bărbuleț, Strâmba

The Râul Alb is a left tributary of the river Dâmbovița in Romania. It discharges into the Dâmbovița in Lunca. Its length is 30 km (19 mi) and its basin size is 97 km^{2} (37 sq mi).
