= Kevin Zhu =

Kevin Zhu may refer to:

- Kevin Zhu (academic)
- Kevin Zhu (violinist)
