= Paganini Competition =

International violin competition

Logo of the Premio Paganini

The Paganini Competition (also known as the Premio Paganini or Paganini Concorso Internazionale di Violino) is an international violin competition named after the famed virtuoso Niccolò Paganini, considered the founder of modern violin technique. Established in 1954, it is currently held biennially at the Teatro Carlo Felice in Genoa, Italy, typically in September or October.

The Premio Paganini is one of the most important violin competitions. Following a pre-selection stage, the contest consists of three rounds: preliminaries, semi-finals, and finals. The required repertoire includes works for solo violin, violin and piano accompaniment, and violin with orchestra, featuring compositions by Niccolò Paganini and a contemporary work commissioned by the competition. Performers may also include works by other composers in their programs.

== History ==
The Paganini Competition was established in 1954 in Genoa as part of the city’s Colombian Celebrations, following a proposal first made in 1940 by music critic Carlo Marcello Rietmann. The initiative, delayed by World War II, was realized under Councillor for Fine Arts Lazzaro Maria De Bernardis and composer Luigi Cortese, who served as the first Artistic Director.

Originally held at the Niccolò Paganini Conservatory, the competition later moved to the Teatro Margherita to accommodate larger audiences and, since 1992, has taken place at the Teatro Carlo Felice. It gained international recognition early on and became a founding member of the World Federation of International Music Competitions in 1957.

Over time the competition has undergone several structural changes: it shifted from an annual to a biennial event, introduced open preliminary rounds in the 1980s, and later added international pre-selections in cities such as Genoa, New York, Vienna and Tokyo. Since 2004, contemporary works have been commissioned for competition performance, and the organizational role has been shared with the Fondazione Teatro Carlo Felice.

== Eligibility ==
Participants of all nationalities may participate, provided they are at least 15 by the applicant deadline and no older than 31 years of age through the duration of the competition.

== Competition ==
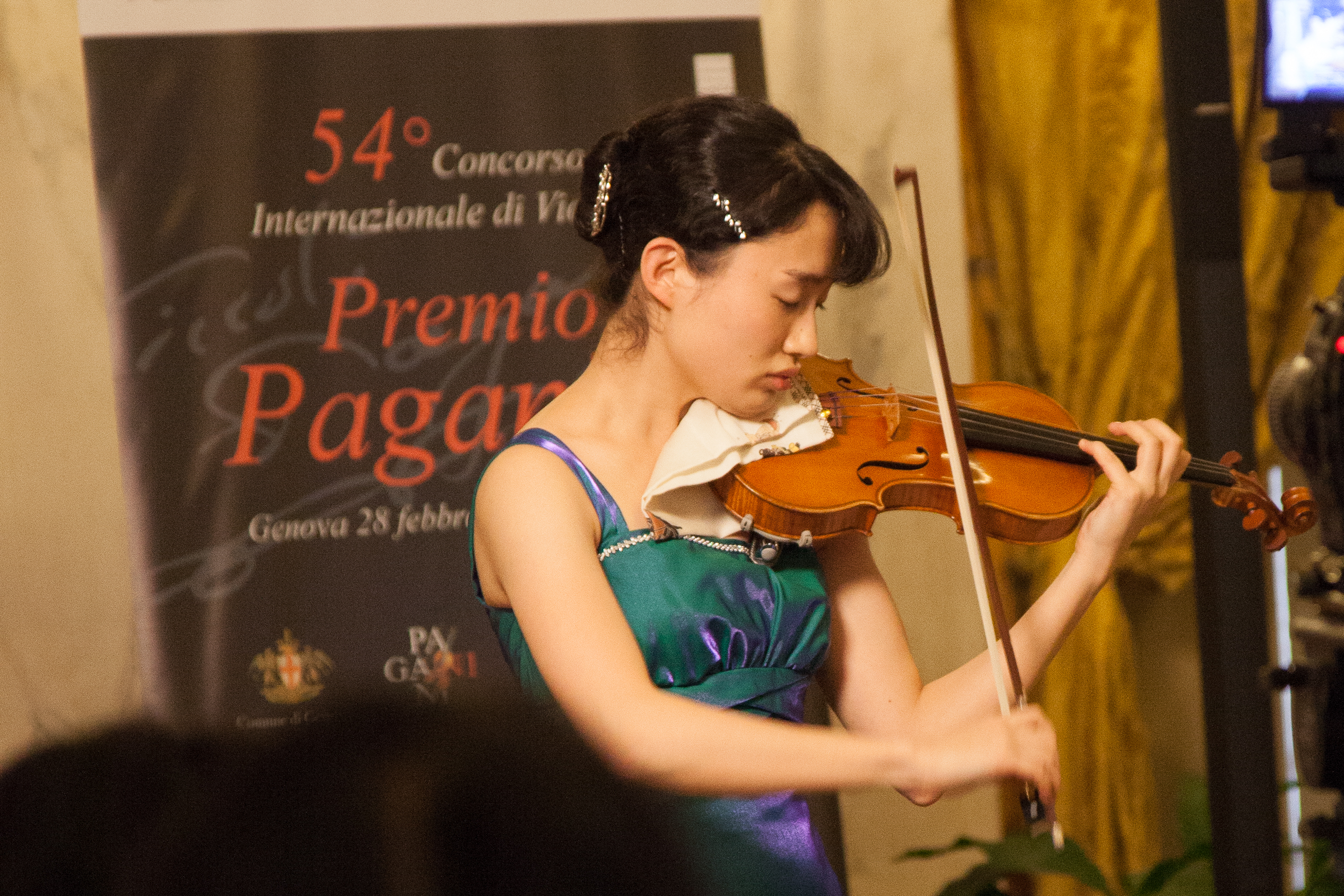
Paganini Competition performance in 2015

The competition was held annually between 1954 and 2001. Since then, its frequency has varied, including a five-year hiatus between 2010 and 2015. Under current rules, it is scheduled to take place every two years.

Preliminaries: Preliminary repertoire includes two selections for solo violin or violin and piano accompaniment, and two of Niccolò Paganini’s Caprices, Op. 1.

Semi-Finals: Candidates perform three or four works for solo violin or violin and piano, including one virtuosic piece by Paganini and one contemporary composition.

Finals: Candidates perform two works with orchestra, one of which must be by Paganini. These may be complete concertos or selected movements.

== Jury ==
The international jury consists of seven to nine members, who are usually violinists but sometimes conductors, composers, and other musicians.

In February 2018, prior to that year's competition, chairman Fabio Luisi resigned in protest at what he described as external interference in the jury selection process by city cultural official Elisa Serafini.

== Awards ==
The first prize, known as the Premio Paganini, is not necessarily awarded each edition. The winner is given the opportunity to perform on Paganini’s 1743 Il Cannone violin by Guarneri 'del Gesù', and may receive concert and recording engagements. Joint winners are no longer awarded.

Six musicians place, though occasionally seven have been awarded prizes. Since 1989, special distinctions and prizes may also be granted by external institutions or donors.

== Special awards ==
- Prize in memory of Dr. Enrico Costa: Offered by the Costa Family to the youngest participant admitted to the Final.
- Prize in memory of Renato De Barbieri: Offered by the Government of the Province of Genoa to one of the finalists for the best interpretation of Paganini’s Capricci within the Preliminary and Semifinal Stages.
- Prize of the Association Amici di Paganini: Offered by the Association for the finest performance of the Paganini Concerto.
- Prize in memory of Mario Ruminelli: Offered by the Ruminelli Family to the best placed finalist
- Friends of the Nuovo Carlo Felice Association prize: Offered for the best performance of the commissioned work.

== Winners ==
Year	Winner	Country
1954	Not awarded	
1955	Not awarded	
1956	György Pauk	Hungary
1956	Gérard Poulet	France
1957	Not awarded	
1958	Salvatore Accardo	Italy
1959	Stuart Canin	United States
1960	Not awarded	
1961	Emil Kamilarov	Bulgaria
1962	Maryvonne Le Dizès	France
1963	Oleh Krysa	Soviet Union
1964	Jean-Jacques Kantorow	France
1965	Viktor Pikaizen	Soviet Union
1966	Not awarded	
1967	Grigori Zhislin	Soviet Union
1968	Miriam Fried	Israel
1969	Gidon Kremer	Soviet Union
1970	Not awarded	
1971	Mose Sekler	Soviet Union
1972	Eugene Fodor	United States
1973	Alexander Kramarov	Soviet Union
1974	Not awarded	
1975	Yuri Korchinski	Soviet Union
1976	Lenuţa Ciulei	Romania
1977	Ilya Grubert	Soviet Union
1978	Eugen Sârbu	Romania
1979	Florin Paul	Romania
1980	Not awarded	
1981	Ilya Kaler	Soviet Union
1982	Not awarded	
1983	Not awarded	
1984	Not awarded	
1985	Dmitri Berlinsky	Soviet Union
1986	Not awarded	
1987	Lu Siqing	China
1988	Leonidas Kavakos	Greece
1989	Not awarded	
1990	Natalia Prischepenko	Soviet Union
1991	Massimo Quarta	Italy
1992	Julia Krasko	Russia
1993	Isabelle Faust	Germany
1994	Bin Huang	China
1995	Not awarded	
1996	Soovin Kim	United States
1997	Giovanni Angeleri	Italy
1998	Ilya Gringolts	Russia
1999	Sayaka Shoji	Japan
2000	Natalia Lomeiko	New Zealand/Russia
2001	Mariusz Patyra	Poland
2002	Mengla Huang	China
2004	Not awarded	
2006	Feng Ning	China
2008	Not awarded	
2010	Not awarded	
2015	In Mo Yang	South Korea
2018	Kevin Zhu	United States
2021	Giuseppe Gibboni	Italy
2023	Simon Zhu	Germany
2025	Aozhe Zhang	China

== Breakdown of winners and finalists by nationality ==
Winners by nationality
8	Soviet Union
5	United States
5	China
4	Italy
4	Romania
4	Russia
3	France
2	Germany
1	Greece
1	Hungary
1	Israel
1	Japan
1	South Korea
1	New Zealand
1	Poland

Finalists by nationality
45	Japan
37	Soviet Union
27	France
25	United States
20	Italy
13	Poland
12	Germany
12	Romania
10	South Korea
9	Russia
8	Bulgaria
7	Israel
7	China
3	United Kingdom
3	Hungary
3	Latvia
3	Ukraine
2	Austria
1	Belgium
1	Denmark
1	Greece
1	Iceland
1	Lebanon
1	Mexico
1	New Zealand
1	Netherlands
1	Portugal
1	East Germany
1	Serbia
1	Slovakia
1	Sweden

== Highest number of prizes held ==
Prize winners with a minimum of three prizes, including special prizes and prizes across multiple editions, are listed here.

- Giovanni Angeleri (Italy) - 7 prizes
- Eijin Nimura (Japan) - 5 prizes
- Yuki Manuela Janke (Germania/Japan) - 4 prizes
- Jean-Pierre Wallez (France) - 4 prizes
- In Mo Yang (South Korea) - 4 prizes
- Kevin Zhu (US) - 4 prizes
- Ilya Gringolts (Russia) - 3 prizes
- Mengla Huang (China) - 3 prizes
- Stephanie Jeong (US) - 3 prizes
- Dami Kim (South Korea) - 3 prizes
- Feng Ning (China) - 3 prizes
- Mariusz Patyra (Poland) - 3 prizes
- Gabriele Pieranunzi (Italy) - 3 prizes
- Sayaka Shoji (Japan) - 3 prizes
- Reiko Watanabe (Japan) - 3 prizes
- Hyun Seo Kim (South Korea) - 3 prizes

== Past prize-winners ==
=== I Edition - 1954 ===
Not awarded

=== II Edition - 1955 ===
- 1st Prize: Not awarded
- 2nd Prize: Not awarded
- 3rd Prize: Luciano Vicari (Italy)
- 4th Prize: Liliane Beretti (France) and Jean Louis Stuurop (Netherlands)

=== III Edition - 1956 ===
- 1st Prize: György Pauk (Hungary) and Gérard Poulet (France)
- 2nd Prize: Not awarded
- 3rd Prize: Not awarded
- 4th Prize: Carmencita Lozada (Philippines), Luciano Vicari (Italy) and Jean-Pierre Wallez (France)

=== IV Edition - 1957 ===
- 1st Prize: Not awarded
- 2nd Prize: Salvatore Accardo (Italy) and Pierre Doukan (France)
- 4th Prize: Jean-Pierre Wallez (France)
- 5th Prize: Not awarded

=== V Edition - 1958 ===
- 1st Prize: Salvatore Accardo (Italy)
- 2nd Prize: Jean-Pierre Wallez (France)

=== VI Edition - 1959 ===
- 1st Prize: Stuart Canin (US)
- 2nd Prize: Saschko Gawriloff (Germany)
- 3rd Prize: Liliane Caillon (France)
- 4th Prize: Catherine Courtois (France)
- 5th Prize: Eleonora Dell'Aquila (Italy)
- 6th Prize: Johannes Brüning (Germany)

=== VII Edition - 1960 ===
- 1st Prize: Not awarded
- 2nd Prize: Jean-Pierre Wallez (France) and Yossi Zivoni (Israel)
- 4th Prize: Gigino Maestri (Italy)
- 6th Prize: Josef Sivo (Austria)

=== VIII Edition - 1961 ===
- 1st Prize: Emil Kamilarov (Bulgaria)
- 2nd Prize: Elaine Skorodin (US) and Carmencita Lozada (Philippines)
- 4th Prize: Bice Antonioni (Italy) and Paulette Bedin (France)

=== IX Edition - 1962 ===
- 1st Prize: Maryvonne Le Dizès (France)
- 2nd Prize: Etsuko Hirose (Japan)
- 3rd Prize: Liliane Caillon (France)
- 4th Prize: Marilyn Dubow (US)

=== X Edition - 1963 ===
- 1st Prize: Oleh Krysa (USSR)
- 2nd Prize: Valentin Zuk (USSR)
- 3rd Prize: Shizuko Ishii (Japan)
- 4th Prize: Paul Zukofsky (US)
- 5th Prize: Diana Cummings (Great Britain)
- 6th Prize: Igor Politkovsky (USSR)

=== XI Edition - 1964 ===
- 1st Prize: Jean-Jacques Kantorow (France)
- 2nd Prize: Pierre Amoyal (France) and Yoko Kubo (Japan)
- 4th Prize: Hisako Tokue (Japan) and Tomotada Soh (Japan)
- 6th Prize: Antoine Goulard (France)

=== XII Edition - 1965 ===
- 1st Prize: Viktor Pikaizen (USSR)
- 2nd Prize: Philippe Hirschhorn (USSR)
- 3rd Prize: Andrei Korsakov (USSR)
- 4th Prize: Yoko Kubo (Japan)
- 5th Prize: Elisabeth Balmas (France), Joshua Epstein (Israel) and Jacques Israelievitch (France)

=== XIII Edition - 1966 ===
- 1st Prize: Not awarded
- 2nd Prize: Robert Menga (US)
- 3rd Prize: Isako Shinozaki (Japan)
- 5th Prize: Nicolai Marangosof (Bulgaria) and Kineko Okumura (Japan)

=== XIV Edition - 1967 ===
- 1st Prize: Grigori Zhislin (USSR)
- 2nd Prize: Vladimir Spivakov (USSR)
- 3rd Prize: Patrice Fontanarosa (France)
- 4th Prize: Petar Delcev (Bulgaria)
- 5th Prize: Sergio Diacenko (USSR)
- 6th Prize: Mikhail Gantwarg (USSR)

=== XV Edition - 1968 ===
- 1st Prize: Miriam Fried (Israel)
- 2nd Prize: Hamao Fujiwara (Japan)
- 3rd Prize: Gabriella Ijac (Romania)
- 4th Prize: Petar Delcev (Bulgaria)
- 5th Prize: Masako Yanagita (Japan)
- 6th Prize: Emmanuel Krivine (France)

=== XVI Edition - 1969 ===
- 1st Prize: Gidon Kremer (USSR)
- 2nd Prize: Kathleen Lenski (US)
- 3rd Prize: Joshua Epstein (Israel)
- 4th Prize: Isidora Schwarzberg (USSR)
- 5th Prize: Sergey Kravchenko (USSR)
- 6th Prize: Josef Rissin (USSR)
- 7th Prize: Adam Korniszewski (Poland)

=== XVII Edition - 1970 ===
- 1st Prize: Not awarded
- 2nd Prize: Mintcho Mintchev (Bulgaria)
- 3rd Prize: Thomas Goldschmidt Egel (Germany) and Michał Grabarczyk (Poland)
- 5th Prize: Adam Korniszewski (Poland)
- 6th Prize: Keiko Wataya (Japan)

=== XVIII Edition - 1971 ===
- 1st Prize: Mose Sekler (USSR)
- 2nd Prize: Bogodar Kotorovych (USSR)
- 3rd Prize: Roswitha Randacher (Austria)
- 4th Prize: Tadeusz Gadzina (Poland)
- 5th Prize: Elvira Nakipbecova (USSR)
- 6th Prize: Maria Balint (Hungary)

=== XIX Edition - 1972 ===
- 1st Prize: Eugene Fodor (US)
- 2nd Prize: Yoko Sato (Japan)
- 3rd Prize: Gerardo Ribeiro (Portugal)
- 4th Prize: Georgi Tilev (Bulgaria)
- 5th Prize: Teresa Glabowna (Poland)

=== XX Edition - 1973 ===
- 1st Prize: Alexander Kramarov (USSR)
- 2nd Prize: Yuval Yaron (Israel)
- 3rd Prize: Vania Milanova (Bulgaria)
- 4th Prize: Sungil Lee (Korea)
- 5th Prize: Giuliano Carmignola (Italy) and Stefan Stalanowski (Poland)

=== XXI Edition - 1974 ===
- 1st Prize: Not awarded
- 2nd Prize: Lynn Chang (US) and Eugen Sârbu (Romania)
- 4th Prize: Rasma Lielmane (Mexico)
- 5th Prize: Josif Rissin (Israel)
- 6th Prize: Jean-Claude Velin (France)
- 7th Prize: Marie-France Pouillot (France)

=== XXII Edition - 1975 ===
- 1st Prize: Yuri Korchinski (USSR)
- 2nd Prize: Petru Csaba (Romania)
- 6th Prize: Mark Fornaciari (Italy) and Anna Aleksandra Wodka (Poland)

=== XXIII Edition - 1976 ===
- 1st Prize: Lenuța Ciulei (Romania)
- 2nd Prize: Karen Eley (US)
- 3rd Prize: Vladimir Nemțeanu (Romania)
- 4th Prize: Fudeko Takahashi (Japan)
- 5th Prize: Joanna Madroszkiewicz (Poland)

=== XXIV Edition - 1977 ===
- 1st Prize: Ilya Grubert (USSR)
- 2nd Prize: Sachiko Nakajima (Japan)
- 3rd Prize: Yumi Mohri (Japan)
- 4th Prize: Edward Zienkowski (Poland)
- 5th Prize: Alexey Bruni (USSR)
- 6th Prize: Ola Rudner (Sweden)

=== XXV Edition - 1978 ===
- 1st Prize: Eugen Sârbu (Romania)
- 2nd Prize: Karen Eley (US) and Piotr Milewski (Poland)
- 4th Prize: Takashi Shimitzu (Japan)
- 5th Prize: Berthilde Dufour (France)
- 6th Prize: Daniel Stabrawa (Poland)

=== XXVI Edition - 1979 ===
- 1st Prize: Florin Paul (Romania)
- 2nd Prize: Yuriko Naganuma (Japan)
- 3rd Prize: Alexis Galpérine (France)
- 4th Prize: Mariko Senju (Japan)
- 5th Prize: Rodolfo Bonucci (Italy)

=== XXVII Edition - 1980 ===
- 1st Prize: Not awarded
- 2nd Prize: Niculae Tudor (Romania)
- 3rd Prize: Sonig Tchakerian (Italy)
- 4th Prize: Eduard Wulfson (USSR)
- 5th Prize: Mitsuko Ishii (Japan)
- 6th Prize: Daniel Stabrawa (Poland) and Walter Bertrand (France)

=== XXVIII Edition - 1981 ===
- 1st Prize: Ilja Kaler (USSR)
- 2nd Prize: Leonid Sorokov (USSR)
- 3rd Prize: Frank Almond (US)
- 4th Prize: Kuniko Nagata (Japan)
- 5th Prize: Mircea Călin (Romania)
- 6th Prize: Francine Trachier (France)

=== XXIX Edition - 1982 ===
- 1st Prize: Not awarded
- 2nd Prize: Alexander Markov (US) and Boris Garlitsky (USSR)
- 3rd Prize: Sonoko Numata (Japan)
- 4th Prize: Philippe Djokic (France-US), Maxim Fedotov (USSR) and Hiroko Suzuki (Japan)

=== XXX Edition - 1983 ===
- 1st Prize: Not awarded
- 2nd Prize: Laurent Korcia (France)
- 3rd Prize: Sung-Sic Yang (Korea)
- 4th Prize: Reiko Watanabe (Japan)
- 5th Prize: Boris Schmitz (Germany)
- 6th Prize: Soon-Ik Lee (Korea) and Kazimierz Olechowski (Poland)

=== XXXI Edition - 1984 ===
- 1st Prize: Not awarded
- 2nd Prize: Vadim Brodski (USSR)
- 3rd Prize: Reiko Watanabe (Japan)
- 4th Prize: Elisa Kawaguti (Japan)
- 5th Prize: Stéphane Tran Ngoc (France)

=== XXXII Edition - 1985 ===
- 1st Prize: Dmitri Berlinsky (USSR)
- 2nd Prize: Mark Moghilevski (USSR)
- 3rd Prize: Gabriel Croitoru (Romania)
- 4th Prize: Anguelina Abadjieva (Bulgaria) and Anton Kholodenko (USSR)
- 6th Prize: Thomas Böttcher (East Germany)

=== XXXIII Edition - 1986 ===
- 1st Prize: Not awarded
- 2nd Prize: Reiko Watanabe (Japan)
- 3rd Prize: Yuri Braginski (Belgium)
- 4th Prize: Andreas Krecher (Germany)
- 5th Prize: Akiko Ueda (Japan)
- 6th Prize: Jeanne-Marie Conquer (France)

=== XXXIV Edition - 1987 ===
- 1st Prize: Lu Siqing (China)
- 2nd Prize: Pavel Berman (USSR)
- 3rd Prize: Alexei Koshvanets (USSR)
- 4th Prize: Adam Taubic (Poland) and Vincenzo Bolognese (Italy)
- 6th Prize: Viktor Kuznetsov (USSR)

=== XXXV Edition - 1988 ===
- 1st Prize: Leonidas Kavakos (Greece)
- 2nd Prize: Akiko Suwanai (Japan)
- 3rd Prize: Eijin Nimura (Japan)
- 4th Prize: Gabriele Pieranunzi (Italy)
- 5th Prize: Pavel Pekarsky (US)
- 6th Prize: Ara Malikian (Lebanon/Spain)

=== XXXVI Edition - 1989 ===
- 1st Prize: Not awarded
- 2nd Prize: Vasko Vassilev (Bulgaria)
- 3rd Prize: Oleg Pokhanovski (USSR)
- 4th Prize: Anastasia Chebotareva (USSR)
- 5th Prize: Tomoko Kawada (Japan)
- 6th Prize: Ilja Sekler (USSR) and Eijin Nimura (Japan)
- Prize in memory of Dr. Enrico Costa: Luca Fanfoni (Italy)

=== XXXVII Edition - 1990 ===
- 1st Prize: Natalia Prischepenko (USSR)
- 2nd Prize: Chin Kim (US)
- 3rd Prize: Gabriele Pieranunzi (Italy)
- 4th Prize: Graf Mourja (USSR)
- 5th Prize: Roberto Cani (Italy)
- 6th Prize: Alexander Trostianski (USSR)
- Prize in memory of Dr. Enrico Costa: Gabriele Pieranunzi

=== XXXVIII Edition - 1991 ===
- 1st Prize: Massimo Quarta (Italy)
- 2nd Prize: Florin Croitoru (Romania)
- 3rd Prize: Nicolas Gourbeix (France) and Misha Keylin (US)
- 5th Prize: Yumi Makita (Japan)
- 6th Prize: Ko-Woon Yang (Korea)
- Prize in memory of Dr. Enrico Costa: Massimo Quarta

=== XXXIX Edition - 1992 ===
- 1st Prize: Julia Krasko (Russia)
- 2nd Prize: Michiko Kamiya (Japan)
- 3rd Prize: Eijin Nimura (Japan)
- 4th Prize: Giovanni Angeleri (Italy) and Karen Lee (US)
- 5th Prize: Ara Malikian (Armenia)
- Prize in memory of Dr. Enrico Costa: Giovanni Angeleri

=== XL Edition - 1993 ===
- 1st Prize: Isabelle Faust (Germany)
- 2nd Prize: Stefan Milenkovic (FR Yugoslavia)
- 3rd Prize: Yuka Eguchi (Japan)
- 4th Prize: Florin Ionescu-Galaţi (Romania)
- 5th Prize: Eijin Nimura (Japan)
- 6th Prize: Giovanni Angeleri (Italy)
- Prize in memory of Dr. Enrico Costa: Giovanni Angeleri
- Prize in memory of Renato De Barbieri: Rachel Barton (US)

=== XLI Edition - 1994 ===
- 1st Prize: Bin Huang (China)
- 2nd Prize: Eijin Nimura (Japan)
- 3rd Prize: Dmitri Makhtine (Russia)
- 4th Prize: Stefan Milenković (FR Yugoslavia)
- 5th Prize: Giovanni Angeleri (Italy)
- 6th Prize: Giacobbe Stevanato (Italy)
- Prize in memory of Dr. Enrico Costa: Giovanni Angeleri
- Prize in memory of Renato De Barbieri: Bin Huang
- Friends of the Nuovo Carlo Felice Association prize: Aki Sunahara (Japan) and Giordan Nikolitch (Slovenia)

=== XLII Edition - 1995 ===
- 1st Prize: Not awarded
- 2nd Prize: Alexandru Tomescu (Romania)
- 3rd Prize: Oleg Pokhanovski (Russia)
- 4th Prize: Leor Maltinski (Israel)
- 5th Prize: Stefan Schramm (Germany)
- 6th Prize: Antonello Manacorda (Italy)
- Special prize of the Giuria: Anastasia Khitruk (US)
- Prize in memory of Dr. Enrico Costa: Leor Maltinski
- Friends of the Nuovo Carlo Felice Association prize: Stefan Schramm

=== XLIII Edition - 1996 ===
- 1st Prize: Soovin Kim (US)
- 2nd Prize: Andrew Haveron (Great Britain)
- 3rd Prize: Ju-Young Baek (Korea)
- 4th Prize: Sergei Levitin (Russia)
- 5th Prize: Florin Croitoru (Romania)
- 6th Prize: Jasmine Lin (US)
- Prize in memory of Dr. Enrico Costa: Soovin Kim
- Prize in memory of Renato De Barbieri: Sergei Levitin
- Friends of the Nuovo Carlo Felice Association prize: Andrew Haveron

=== XLIV Edition - 1997 ===
- 1st Prize: Giovanni Angeleri (Italy)
- 2nd Prize: Rodion Petrov (Russia)
- 3rd Prize: Judith Ingolfsson (Iceland)
- 4th Prize: Kyoko Yonemoto (Japan)
- 5th Prize: Hanako Uesato (Japan)
- 6th Prize: Maki Nagata (Japan)
- Prize in memory of Dr. Enrico Costa: Kyoko Yonemoto
- Prize in memory of Renato De Barbieri: Rodion Petrov
- Friends of the Nuovo Carlo Felice Association prize: Laura Andriani (Italy)

=== XLV Edition - 1998 ===
- 1st Prize: Ilya Gringolts (Russia)
- 2nd Prize: Baiba Skride (Latvia)
- 3rd Prize: Takako Yamasaki (Japan)
- 4th Prize: Michael Vitenson (Israel)
- 5th Prize: Anton Polezhayev (US)
- 6th Prize: Maki Itoi (Japan)
- Prize in memory of Dr. Enrico Costa: Ilya Gringolts
- Prize in memory of Renato De Barbieri: Maciko Shimada (Japan)
- Friends of the Nuovo Carlo Felice Association prize: Ilya Gringolts

=== XLVI Edition - 1999 ===
- 1st Prize: Sayaka Shoji (Japan)
- 2nd Prize: Frank Huang (China)
- 3rd Prize: Akiko Ono (Japan)
- 4th Prize: Weiyi Wang (China)
- 5th Prize: Emil Chudnovsky (US)
- 6th Prize: Gabriel Adorjan (Denmark)
- Prize in memory of Dr. Enrico Costa: Sayaka Shoji
- Prize in memory of Mario Ruminelli: Sayaka Shoji
- Friends of the Nuovo Carlo Felice Association prize: Francesco Manara (Italy)

=== XLVII Edition - 2000 ===
- 1st Prize: Natalia Lomeiko (New Zealand/Russia)
- 2nd Prize: Sayako Kusaka (Japan)
- 3rd Prize: Karin Ato (Japan) and Vadim Tchijik (Russia)
- 5th Prize: Sophie Moser (Germany)
- 6th Prize: Myroslava Ivanchenko (Ukraine)
- Prize in memory of Dr. Enrico Costa: Sophie Moser
- Prize in memory of Renato De Barbieri: Sayako Kusaka
- Prize in memory of the Mario Ruminelli: Natalia Lomeiko
- Friends of the Nuovo Carlo Felice Association prize: Vadim Tchijik

=== XLVIII Edition - 2001 ===
- 1st Prize: Mariusz Patyra (Poland)
- 2nd Prize: Minjae Kim (South Korea)
- 3rd Prize: Tanja Becker-Bender (Germany)
- 4th Prize: Jack Liebeck (Great Britain)
- 5th Prize: A-Rah Shin (South Korea)
- 6th Prize: Gyula Vadászi (Hungary)
- Prize in memory of Dr. Enrico Costa: A-Rah Shin
- Prize in memory of Renato De Barbieri: Mariusz Patyra
- Prize in memory of the Mario Ruminelli: Mariusz Patyra
- Friends of the Nuovo Carlo Felice Association prize: Tanja Becker-Bender

=== IL Edition - 2002 ===
- 1st Prize: Mengla Huang (China)
- 2nd Prize: Maxim Brylinski (Ukraine)
- 3rd Prize: Daniel Roehn (Germany-Sweden)
- 4th Prize: Emil Chudnovski (US) and Giulio Plotino (Italy)
- 6th Prize: Kyoko Une (Japan)
- Prize in memory of Dr. Enrico Costa: Maxim Brylinski
- Prize in memory of Renato De Barbieri: Mengla Huang
- Prize in memory of the Mario Ruminelli: Mengla Huang
- Friends of the Nuovo Carlo Felice Association prize: Alexis Cardenas (Venezuela)

=== L Edition - 2004 ===
- 1st Prize: Not awarded
- 2nd Prize: Yuki Manuela Janke (Germany/Japan)
- 3rd Prize: Hyun Soo Shin (South Korea)
- 4th Prize: Dalibor Karvay (Slovakia)
- 5th Prize: Bracha Malkin (US/Israel)
- 6th Prize: Diego Tosi (France)
- Prize in memory of Renato De Barbieri: Alicia N Evans
- Prize in memory of Dr. Enrico Costa: Alicia N Evans
- Prize in memory of the Mario Ruminelli: Yuki Manuela Janke
- Friends of the Nuovo Carlo Felice Association prize: Yuki Manuela Janke

=== LI Edition - 2006 ===
- 1st Prize: Ning Feng (China)
- 2nd Prize: Yura Lee (South Korea)
- 3rd Prize: Rika Masato (Japan)
- Finalists: Hyun Joo Choo (South Korea), Bo-Kyung Lee (South Korea), Sergey Malov (Russia)
- Prize in memory of Dr. Enrico Costa: Hyun Joo Choo
- Prize in memory of the Renato De Barbieri: Ning Feng
- Prize in memory of Mario Ruminelli: Sergey Malov
- Friends of the Nuovo Carlo Felice Association prize: Ning Feng

=== LII Edition - 2008 ===
- 1st Prize: Not awarded
- 2nd Prize: Stephanie Jeong (US)
- 3rd Prize: Sean Lee (US)
- Finalists: Francesca Dego (Italy), Evgeny Sviridov (Russia)
- Prize in memory of Dr. Enrico Costa: Francesca Dego
- Prize in memory of Renato De Barbieri: Evgeny Sviridov
- Friends of Paganini Association Prize: Stephanie Jeong
- Prize in memory of Mario Ruminelli: Stephanie Jeong
- Friends of the Nuovo Carlo Felice Association prize: Evgeny Sviridov

=== LIII Edition - 2010 ===
- 1st Prize: Not awarded
- 2nd Prize: Dami Kim (South Korea)
- 3rd Prize: Stefan Tarara (Germany)
- Finalists: Yu-Chien Tseng 曾宇謙 (Taiwan), Fedor Rudin (France)
- Prize in memory of Dr. Enrico Costa: Yu-Chien Tseng
- Friends of Paganini Association Prize: Yu-Chien Tseng
- Prize in memory of Mario Ruminelli: Dami Kim
- Prize in memory of Renato De Barbieri: Dami Kim
- Friends of the Nuovo Carlo Felice Association prize: Stefan Tarara

=== LIV Edition - 2015 ===
- 1st Prize: In Mo Yang (South Korea)
- 2nd Prize: Fumika Mohri (Japan)
- 3rd Prize: Albrecht Menzel (Germany)
- 4th Prize: Diana Pasko (Russia)
- 5th Prize: Elly Suh (US/South Korea)
- 6th Prize: Dainis Medjaniks (Latvia)
- Prize in memory of Dr. Enrico Costa: In Mo Yang
- Prize in memory of Renato De Barbieri: Tan Yabing (China)
- Prize in memory of Mario Ruminelli: In Mo Yang
- Friends of the Nuovo Carlo Felice Association prize: In Mo Yang

=== LV Edition - 2018 ===
- 1st Prize: Kevin Zhu (US)
- 2nd Prize: Fedor Rudin (France)
- 3rd Prize: Stephen Kim (US)
- 4th Prize: Yiliang Jiang (China)
- 5th Prize: Oleksandr Pusharenko (Ukraine)
- 6th Prize: Luke Hsu (US)
- Prize in memory of Dr. Enrico Costa: Kevin Zhu
- Prize in memory of Renato De Barbieri: Kevin Zhu
- Prize in memory of Mario Ruminelli: Fedor Rudin
- Prize in memory of Stefano Fiorilla: Kevin Zhu
- Prize of the Associazione Culturale Musica con le Ali: Rennosuke Fukuda (Japan)

=== LVI Edition - 2021 ===
- 1st Prize: Giuseppe Gibboni (Italy)
- 2nd Prize: Nurie Chung (South Korea)
- 3rd Prize: Ava Bahari (Sweden) and Lara Boschkor (Germany)
- Finalists: Olga Artyugina (Russia) and Louisa Staples (United Kingdom)
- Prize in memory of Dr. Enrico Costa: Nurie Chung
- Prize in memory of Renato De Barbieri: Giuseppe Gibboni
- Prize in memory of Mario Ruminelli: Giuseppe Gibboni
- Prize in memory of Stefano Fiorilla: Giuseppe Gibboni
- Prize of the Associazione Amici di Paganini: Nurie Chung

=== LVII Edition - 2023 ===
- 1st Prize: Simon Zhu (Germany)
- 2nd Prize: Jingzhi Zhang (China)
- 3rd Prize: Qingzhu Weng (China)
- 4th Prize: Hawijch Elders (The Netherlands)
- 5th Prize: Koshiro Takeuchi (Japan)
- 6th Prize: Haram Kim (South Korea)
- Prize in memory of Dr. Enrico Costa: Koshiro Takeuchi (Japan)
- Prize in memory of Mario Ruminelli: Jingzhi Zhang (China)
- Prize of the Associazione Amici di Paganini: Koshiro Takeuchi (Japan)
- Prize of the Fondazione Pallavicino: Simon Zhu (Germany)

=== LVIII Edition - 2025 ===
- 1st Prize: Aozhe Zhang (China)
- 2nd Prize: Rino Yoshimoto (Japan)
- 3rd Prize: Hyun Seo Kim (South Korea)
- Prize in memory of Dr. Enrico Costa: Hyun Seo Kim (South Korea)
- Prize in memory of Mario Ruminelli: Hyun Seo Kim (South Korea)
- Prize of the Associazione Amici di Paganini: Yeyeong Jin (South Korea)
- Prize of the Fondazione Pallavicino: Aozhe Zhang (China)
- Hotel Bristol Palace-Duetorrihotels Collection Award: Tianyou Ma (China)

== Video recordings ==
- YouTube playlist of the Premio Paganini, hosted on the Genova More Than This channel
- 2006 Premio Paganini International Violin Competition (Documentary) - Orchestra Teatro Carlo Felice di Genova, DVD Dynamic Cat. 33539 - 105 Min.

== See also ==
- List of classical music competitions
- World Federation of International Music Competitions

== Sources ==
- Large portions of the above information were directly brought over from the Italian Wikipedia.
- Official website of the Premio Paganini
