= Andrew Haveron =

British musician

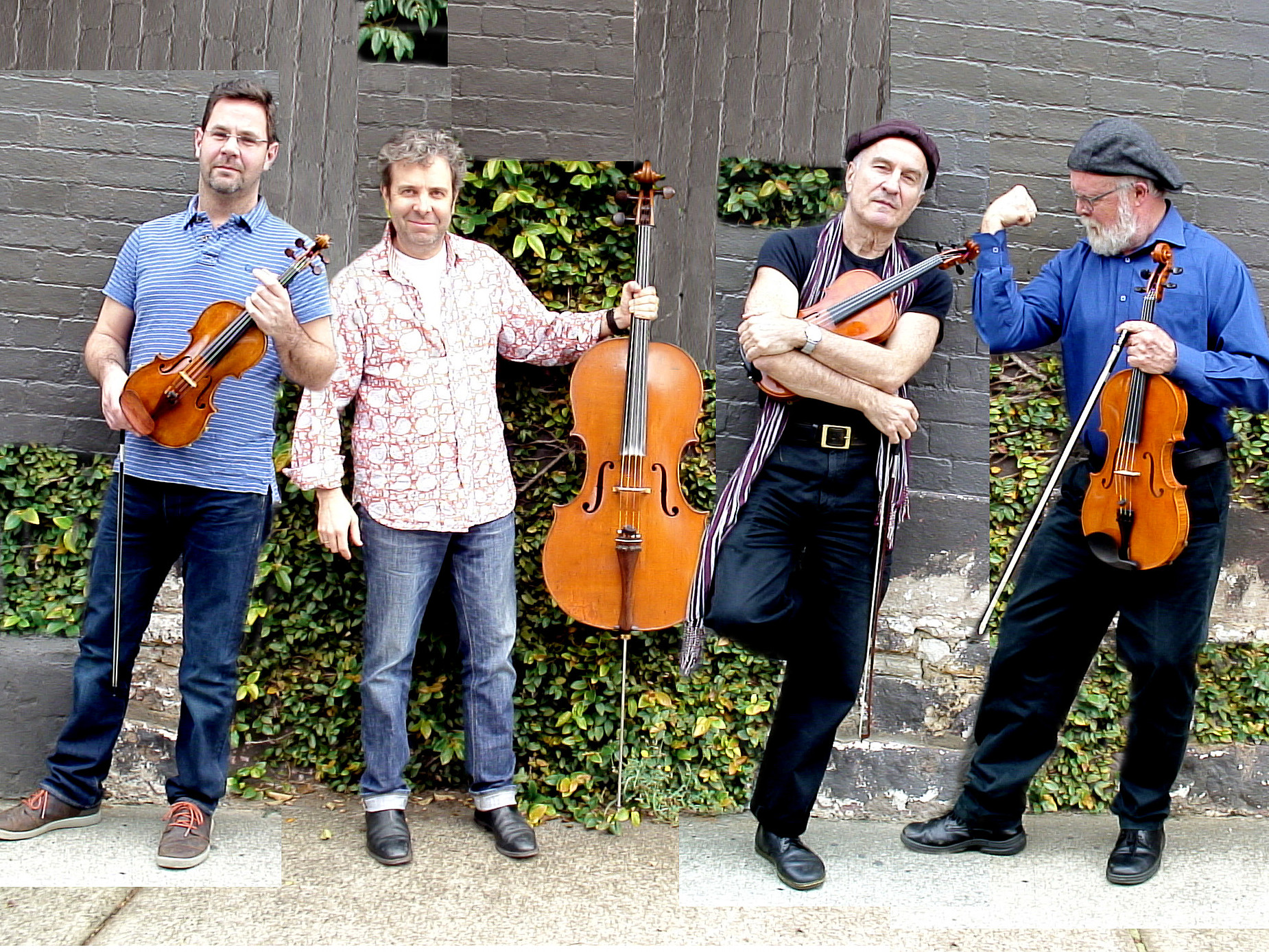
The Elektra String Quartet in 2015, Haveron (left) with Adrian Wallis, Romano Crivici, and Robert Harris

Andrew Haveron (born 1975) is a British violinist and musical director. He currently serves as co-concertmaster of the Sydney Symphony Orchestra.

== Early life ==
Born in London in 1975, Haveron was educated at St Hilary's School, Godalming, the Purcell School for Young Musicians, and the Royal College of Music.

== Career ==
Haveron has served as the leader of the John Wilson Orchestra since it was established in 1994. Between 1999 and 2007, he was first violinist of the Brodsky Quartet, recording many albums, several of which won awards, including the Diapason d'Or and the Choc du Monde de la Musique. He also worked with Anne Sofie von Otter, Alexander Baillie, Paul McCartney, Sting, Kathryn Selby, Elvis Costello, and Björk, and appeared with the Nash and Hebrides ensembles, the Logos Chamber Group, and the Omega Ensemble. He led the World Orchestra for Peace at the invitation of Valery Gergiev.

In 2007, Haveron was appointed as concertmaster of the BBC Symphony Orchestra, in 2012 joined the Philharmonia Orchestra, and since 2013 has been co-concertmaster of the Sydney Symphony Orchestra.

Haveron continues his career as a lead violinist and currently plays a Guadagnini violin on loan to the Sydney Symphony Orchestra.

== Honours ==
In 1996, Haveron placed second in the Paganini Competition, making him the most successful British competitor for fifty years.

In 1998, he placed fifth at the International Violin Competition of Indianapolis.

In 2004 he was awarded an honorary doctorate by the University of Kent for services to music.
