= Mariusz Patyra =

Polish violinist

Mariusz Patyra (born 21 November 1977 in Orzysz, Poland) is a Polish violinist. He won First Prize in the International Violin Competition "Premio Paganini" (Genoa 2001).

== Career ==
In 2001, Mariusz Patyra’s artistic career took off when he won the Niccolo Paganini International Violin Competition. At the same time, Patyra was awarded a special prize for best interpretation of the Paganini Caprices, and was presented with a copy of Paganini’s violin, “Il Cannone”. Mariusz Patyra performed on Niccolo Paganini’s original “Guarneri del Gesu” during a later concert.

Mariusz Patyra began his music education at the age of six. He studied under Prof. J. Kucharski at the Fryderyk Chopin Music Academy in Warsaw; Prof. K.Wegrzyn and Prof. I. Kertscher at the Hochschule für Musik und Theater in Hannover. In October 2000, he received the scholarship of Walter Stauffer Academy in Cremona, where he studied under Maestro Salvatore Accardo. He is a prize winner of the J. Joachim International Violin Competition in Hannover and a laureate of the Stradivari International Competition in Cremona (1998). In addition, he won the Fourth Prize at the Carl Nielsen International Violin Competition as well as the Extra Prize from the Odense Symphony Orchestra (Odense 2000).

Mariusz Patyra’s accomplishments launched performance tours all over the world, including Italy, Poland, Spain, Czech Republic, Russia, Austria, Germany, the United States, Mexico and Japan. He played with such distinguished orchestras as Philharmonic Fondazione Arturo Toscanini, Orchestra di Roma, Orchestra Filarmonica Marchigiana, the Polish Radio Symphony Orchestra, the Polish Radio Chamber Orchestra (“Amadeus”), the Warsaw National Philharmonic Orchestra, Sinfonia Varsovia, Jalisco Philharmonic Orchestra and the Tokyo Royal Chamber Orchestra. The recordings he has made for Polish, German and Italian radio give insight into the mastery and sensitivity of this young artist.

Mariusz Patyra plays a copy of the Guarneri del Gesu 1733, built by Christian Erichson (Hannover 2003), as well as a copy of "Il Cannone" 1742, built by John.B.Erwin (Dallas 2000).

== Selected discography ==
- Vivaldi: The Four Seasons, Lipinski Royal Fidelity, 2008
- Paganini: Violin Concerto No 1, DUX, 2008
- Wieniawski: Violin Concertos No 1 in f# minor & No 2 in d minor, DUX, 2008
