= Scott Cao =

Chinese luthier

Scott Cao (simplified Chinese: 曹树堃; traditional Chinese: 曹樹堃; pinyin: Cáo Shùkūn; pronounced Ts-awh) is a violin maker (luthier), who is originally from China but now works in Campbell, California, United States.

== Biography ==
In the mid-1970s, amidst Mao's cultural revolution, Cao was a farm worker. A violin-making teacher who visited the area offered him the opportunity of an apprenticeship. He graduated from the Guangzhou Institute of Professions in 1977.

When China opened its borders Cao went to the United States in 1985. He originally stayed in San Francisco where a violin dealer suggested that he should study repairing older instruments under a master luthier. His mentors included eminent violin makers such as Louiz Bellini, Hans Weisshaar, and Roland Feller. In 1990, Scott partnered with Hideo Kamimoto to start a violin shop and returned to China, where he founded a company which makes affordable instruments and bows, including violas, cellos, basses, guitars and established Scott Cao Violins. Three years later Scott was able to open his own shop in the United States in Campbell, California.

His best-known instruments are meticulous copies of famous Stradivari and Guarneri designs.

== Awards ==
- Silver medal for viola, 1996 VSA international competition.
- Silver medal for violin, 1996 VSA international competition.
- Third place overall, viola, 1994, 7th international Antonio Stradivari competition, Cremona, Italy.
- Certificate of Merit for violin tone, 1992 VSA competition.
- Two first place for violin tone and workmanship, 1990 Violin Maker's Association of British Columbia.
- Tone and Workmanship award for viola, 1988 VSA competition.
- Tone award for violin, 1986 VSA competition.

== Owners and players ==
His instruments are known to have been owned or played by:

- Nigel Kennedy
- Gidon Kremer
- Itzhak Perlman
- Mischa Maisky
- Elmar Oliveira
- Eduard Schmieder
- Bin Huang
- Li Chuan Yun
- Ning Feng
- Siqing Lu
- Sergio Prieto
