= Christopher Jessup =

Christopher Jessup may refer to:

- Christopher Jessup (judge)
- Christopher Jessup (composer)
