= Ming-Jiang Zhu =

Chinese violin maker (1956–2014)

- 朱明江
- Born: 1956; Guangzhou, China
- Died: 1 December 2014 (aged 57–58); Guangzhou, China
- Occupation: Luthier
- Known for: Violin making; first Chinese gold medalist at the Violin Society of America international competition

Ming-Jiang Zhu (Chinese: 朱明江; 1956 – 1 December 2014) was a Chinese luthier based in Guangzhou. He was the first violin maker from China to win a gold medal at the Violin Society of America (VSA) international making competition, and over his career received twenty-one awards at that competition, including two gold medals for violin. In 2014 he was given the title "Master of Chinese Violin Making" by the China National Light Industry Council.

== Early life and training ==
Zhu was born in Guangzhou in 1956 to parents who worked as accountants, and grew up without exposure to the violin. Between 1974 and 1976, during the Cultural Revolution, he was sent to do agricultural labour at Wanqingsha in Panyu, south of Guangzhou. In 1976 he was admitted to the newly established Guangzhou violin-making school, where he studied under the makers Xu Fu and Liang Guohui. After graduating he worked at the Guangzhou Musical Instrument Research Institute, continuing his studies under Liang.

== Career and workshop ==
In 1991 Zhu left his state employment and set up a small workshop in his home, which later expanded into a company in Guangzhou. His instruments are made after the patterns of Stradivari and Guarneri, using seasoned European spruce and maple finished with a hand-applied oil varnish.

== International awards ==
Zhu first entered the VSA international violin-making competition in 1986, receiving a certificate of merit for workmanship. By 2014 he had won twenty-one awards at the competition across the violin and viola categories, including two gold medals for violin (1994 and 2006) and two silver medals. His work was the subject of a 1997 profile in Time titled "They're Made Where?" His competition entries were also listed by the British magazine The Strad.

== Honours and positions ==
In 2008 Zhu was admitted as a member of the Entente Internationale des Maîtres-luthiers et Archetiers d'Art (EILA). In 2010 he was named a National Model Worker by the State Council of China, and served as a judge at the first China International Violin Making Competition held in Beijing. He held positions with the China Musical Instrument Association. In 2014 the China National Light Industry Council awarded him the title "Master of Chinese Violin Making".

== Death ==
Zhu died in Guangzhou on 1 December 2014, aged 58.

== Legacy ==
Zhu is regarded, together with Haide Lin and Scott Cao, as a representative of the Guangzhou tradition of violin making, the three having trained in the lineage of Xu Fu and Liang Guohui. Several of his students, including Qiao-Ming Tan, Shao Chen and Wei-Xian Zhu, have themselves won awards at international violin-making competitions. The workshop he founded continued to operate after his death.
