= Julia Krasko =

Russian violinist and professor (born 1971)

Julia Krasko (Russian: Юлия Красько; born 6 April 1971, in Moscow, Russia) is a violinist and a professor.

== Biography ==
Julia Krasko was born into a family of musicians. Her father, Grigory Krasko, was a concertmaster of the Moscow Philharmonic Orchestra. Her mother, Olga Kondratieva, is a pianist and a professor in Gnessin State Musical College.

She graduated from Gnessin Music School, where she studied under Irina Svetlova, and from Moscow Conservatory, where her teacher was Maya Glezarova.

In 1992, she was awarded 1st prize at the Paganini competition. She currently teaches at the Moscow Conservatory.

== Discography ==
- Prokofiev, Bartok, Stravinsky (Russian Disc, 1996)
- Love’s Joy And Sorrow. Julia Krasko Plays Fritz Kreisler (Delos Productions, 1999)
- Glazunov: Symphony No 1, Violin Concerto (Chandos Records, 1999)
