= Maya Glezarova =

Russian violinist and professor (1924–2017)

Maya Samuilovna Glezarova (Russian: Майя Самуиловна Глезарова; 10 December 1924, Moscow – 16 July 2017, Moscow) was a Russian violinist and music pedagogue.

== Biography ==
Glezarova graduated from the Moscow Conservatory in 1949, where she studied with Lev Tseitlin. In 1955, she was invited by Yuri Yankelevich to teach at his class. As Yankelevich's assistant, Glezarova taught Pavel Kogan, Vladimir Spivakov, Vladimir Landsman, Dmitry Sitkovetsky, and Mikhail Kopelman. After Yankelevich's death in 1973, she led her own studio. Among her pupils were Natalya Boyarskaya, Vasko Vasilev and Julia Krasko.
