= Sheng Zhongguo =

Chinese violinist (1941–2018)

Sheng Zhongguo (Chinese: 盛中国; Wade–Giles: Sheng Chung-kuo; 1941 – 7 September 2018) was a Chinese violinist, best known for his rendition of the orchestra work Butterfly Lovers' Violin Concerto. He is widely considered one of China's greatest violinists, known as "China's Menuhin". In 1980, he was named by the Australian Broadcasting Corporation as "one of the world's greatest artists".

== Biography ==
Sheng was born into a musical family in 1941 in Chongqing, China's temporary capital during the Second Sino-Japanese War. His father was the renowned violinist and music professor Sheng Xue (盛雪), and his mother was the vocalist Zhu Bing (朱冰). His parents named him "Zhongguo", the Chinese name for China, hoping for the revival of the country's fortune. He was the eldest of eleven children, nine of whom became violinists.

Sheng was taught to play the violin by his father from the age of five. He made his public debut at age seven, and was recognized as a child prodigy. In 1960, he entered the Moscow Conservatory in the Soviet Union, where he studied under the preeminent violinist Leonid Kogan. Two years later, he became one of the first violinists from China to win an award at the International Tchaikovsky Competition.

He returned to China in 1964, but was unable to perform during the Cultural Revolution (1966–1976). After 1978, he performed more than 100 concerts per year. When Yehudi Menuhin visited China in 1979, he performed Bach's Concerto for Two Violins with Sheng and highly praised him afterwards. Sheng subsequently gained the nickname the "Chinese Menuhin".

In 1980, Sheng toured Australia and held twelve concerts in six cities. He was subsequently named by the Australian Broadcasting Corporation as "one of the world's greatest artists", making him one of the first internationally famous Chinese violinists. Sheng recorded 12 albums and won the Golden Record Award in China.

Sheng married the Japanese pianist Hiroko Seta (濑田裕子) and frequently performed in Japan with his wife. After the Great Hanshin earthquake hit Kobe, Japan in 1995, he toured the disaster-stricken area and was honoured by the Japanese government as a cultural ambassador.

Sheng was President of the Chinese Violin Society and taught at the Central Conservatory of Music. The violinist Lü Siqing was one of his students.

On 7 September 2018, Sheng died of heart disease in Beijing, at the age of 77.
