= Christopher Jessup (composer) =

American composer and pianist

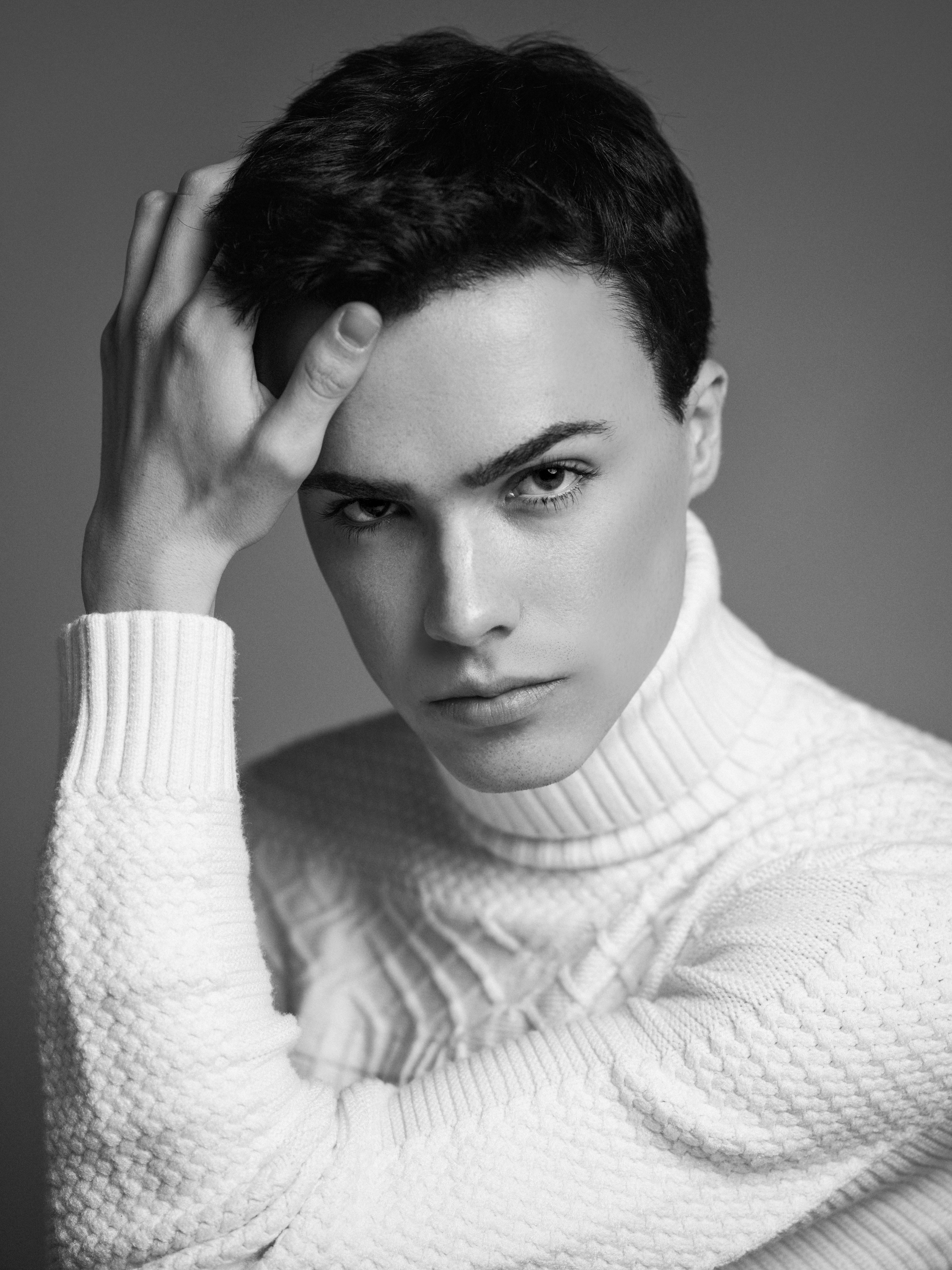
- Born: September 17, 1998 (age 28)
- Citizenship: United States
- Education: The Juilliard School
- Occupations: Composer and Pianist
- Website: christopherjessup.com

Christopher Jessup (born September 17, 1998) is an American composer and pianist.

== Early life and education ==
Jessup began playing piano and composing at an early age, premiering his own piano concerto in Italy at the age of 16. He attended The Juilliard Pre-College starting in 2016 and subsequently attended Juilliard for college, studying with composer Melinda Wagner and pianist Jerome Lowenthal. He graduated in 2021.

== Career ==
Shortly after graduating from Juilliard in 2021, Jessup was signed to Navona Records. Jessup’s music has been performed and recorded by the London Symphony Orchestra, the Juilliard Orchestra, the Nuremberg Symphony Orchestra, the Brno Contemporary Orchestra, The Crossing, the New York Virtuoso Singers, the Kühn Choir of Prague, Choral Arts Initiative, Mostly Modern Brass, the National Sawdust Ensemble, pianists Nadia Shpachenko and Allison Brewster Franzetti, flutist Lindsey Goodman, violinist Kevin Zhu, violist Brett Deubner, cellist Jeffrey Zeigler, and soprano Bree Nichols. Jessup’s works have been performed at Carnegie Hall, Lincoln Center, National Sawdust, and his works are published by BCP Music.

In October 2024, a movement from Jessup's choral cycle Astronomia was featured on The Crossing's album Meciendo. Zachary Woolfe of The New York Times described the piece as the album's "best" and called it "eerie". In October 2026, The Crossing released a recording of the complete three-movement Astronomia cycle on their album Besieged, issued by Navona Records. Jessup also announced that he was composing a new choral work for the ensemble, titled Unbroken, exploring the brain's capacity to heal from psychological trauma through the metaphor of water.

As a pianist, Jessup has performed throughout the United States, Canada, United Kingdom, and Italy. He has performed at Carnegie Hall multiple times, with his piano performances and recordings praised as "refined and eloquent" (New York Concert Review) and "absolutely breathtaking" (Interlude).

Jessup has received recognition from ASCAP, the American Academy of Arts and Letters, the American Prize, the Respighi Prize, and National Sawdust, among others. He has appeared in publications such as The New York Times, Billboard, Gramophone, Fanfare, and Pianist Magazine, and his music has aired on NPR and Classic FM.

=== Discography ===
- The First Movements (2021)
- Christopher Jessup (2023)

== Awards and nominations ==
| Year | Nominated work | Category | Award | Result |
|---|---|---|---|---|
| 2026 | Svítání | Best of North America — Contemporary Instrumental | InterContinental Music Awards | Won |
| 2026 | Christopher Jessup | Music Composition | American Academy of Arts and Letters | Nominated |
| 2025 | Piano Concerto No. 19 in F Major, K. 459 (3rd movement) | Lorin Hollander Award | American Prize | Won |
| 2025 | Astronomia: II. The Mississippi at Midnight | Best Choir/A Cappella Work | Clouzine International Music Awards | Won |
| 2025 | Astronomia: II. The Mississippi at Midnight | Outstanding Achievement | Global Music Awards | Won |
| 2024 | Christopher Jessup | Composition | Respighi Prize | Nominated |
| 2024 | Suite for Viola and Piano | Instrumental Chamber Music | American Prize | Won |
| 2024 | Astronomia: I. When I Heard the Learn’d Astronomer | Choral Music | ASCAP Morton Gould Awards | Nominated |
| 2024 | Le Revenant | Best Contemporary Composition | Clouzine International Music Awards | Won |
| 2024 | Le Revenant | Best Classical Work | Clouzine International Music Awards | Won |
| 2024 | Piano Concerto No. 19 in F Major, K. 459 (3rd movement) | Best Classical Performance | World Entertainment Awards | Nominated |
| 2024 | Astronomia: I. When I Heard the Learn’d Astronomer | Best Classical Music Recording | One Earth Awards | Won |
| 2023 | Astronomia: I. When I Heard the Learn’d Astronomer | Best A Cappella Music | LIT Talent Awards | Won |
| 2023 | Astronomia: I. When I Heard the Learn’d Astronomer | Outstanding Achievement | Global Music Awards | Won |
| 2022 | Christopher Jessup (EP) | Best Classical Album | One World Music Radio Awards | Nominated |
| 2020 | Christopher Jessup | BluePrint Fellowship | National Sawdust | Won |
