= Eugene Sârbu =

Romanian violinist (1950–2024)

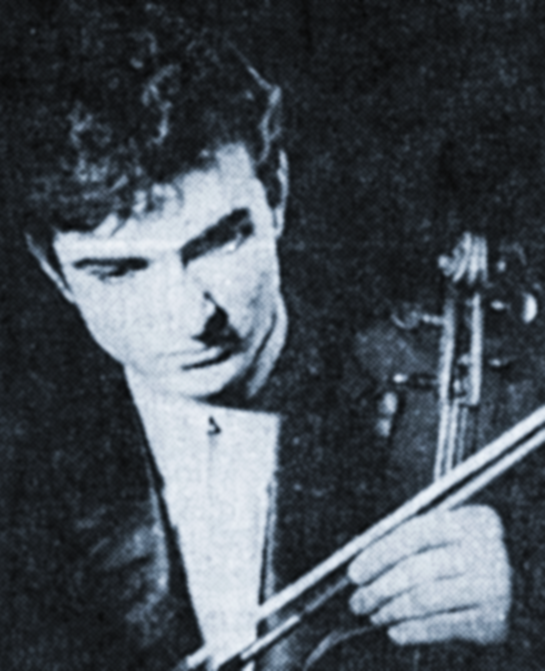
- Eugene Sârbu in July 1970
- Born: Eugen Sîrbu; 6 September 1950; Pietrari, Romanian People's Republic
- Died: 21 July 2024 (aged 73); London, United Kingdom
- Education: Bucharest Conservatory; Curtis Institute of Music; Juilliard School
- Occupations: Classical violinist; Conductor
- Awards: George Enescu Prize

Eugen Sîrbu or Sârbu, known professionally as Eugene Sârbu (6 September 1950 – 21 July 2024), was a Romanian classical violinist. He had an international career as a soloist, recitalist and conductor (from the violin). In 1978, he won both the Paganini Competition and the Carl Flesch International Violin Competition. He premiered works from living composers including Einojuhani Rautavaara, written for him, he recorded violin concertos by Sibelius and Mozart.

== Life and career ==
Born as Eugen Sîrbu (under the spelling used at the time) on 6 September 1950, the future violinist hailed from the village of Pietrari, currently in Dâmbovița County. Growing up during the early stages of the Romanian communist regime, he received his first violin training at age five from his father and played his first solo concert at age six. The boy attended Galați music school, studying under S. Nahmanovici (from 1957 to 1968), but was also enlisted at the city's No 2 School, where he was reportedly a grade-10 student. Before the age of eight, he had already performed at the Romanian Atheneum in Bucharest. Sârbu went on to study at the Bucharest Conservatory, from 1968 to 1970; his professors included G. Avakian and Ionel Geanta. He won the National Festival of Music award in Bucharest in 1958, and he played his first international concert in Roubaix, France, in 1960.

Sârbu decided to leave the communist state and the Eastern Bloc, though he never renounced his Romanian citizenship. He studied further in Paris, with Robert Soetens, before moving to the United States in 1970. On a recommendation by Yehudi Menuhin, he received a scholarship to study with Ivan Galamian at the Curtis Institute of Music in Philadelphia from 1970 to 1974, and further at the Juilliard School in New York City, continuing with Galamian and achieving a master's degree. He also studied with Eugene Ormandy and Ruggiero Ricci, and with Nathan Milstein in Zürich and London. Sârbu was successful in international competitions, winning the Rockefeller Prize for Music (1975), the Paganini Competition in Genoa in 1978, and the Carl Flesch International Violin Competition in London in 1978. He took a joint second in the International Competition for Musicians – West German Radios in Munich in 1975, a third place in the International Jean Sibelius Violin Competition in 1975, and seventh (1980) and ninth place (1976) in the Queen Elisabeth Competition.

Sârbu had an international career as a soloist. He also played in recitals with his sister Carmina Sârbu as the pianist. According to his entry in Grove's, Sârbu's playing was characterised by "purity of intonation and clarity of tone". He played a Stradivarius violin from 1729. He premiered multiple works, including Einojuhani Rautavaara's Violin Concerto, which the composer dedicated to him. In 1980, Sârbu stepped in to replace the soloist in the North Wales International Music Festival, playing Sibelius' Violin Concerto with the BBC Welsh Symphony Orchestra conducted by Henryk Czyz. In a review for The Musical Times, A. J. Heward Rees wrote that he "played fervently though sometimes insecurely". He performed in London in 1981, playing Beethoven's Violin Concerto with the Royal Philharmonic Orchestra conducted by Antal Doráti. Geoffrey Norris, reviewing the concert for The Musical Times, noted that it "seemed so introspective and indulgent in phrasing and tempo that it lost cohesion and became fragmented." Sârbu's Proms debut came the following year with the BBC Symphony Orchestra conducted by Norman Del Mar, in Ernest Chausson's Poème, and he returned in 1983 to play Mozart's Violin Concerto No. 3 with the same orchestra conducted by Ferdinand Leitner. In 1982, he took part in Genoa's celebration of Paganini's bicentenary. In 1984, he participated in the Ulster Festival. His performance of Walton's Violin Concerto with the BBC Philharmonic Orchestra was described by Judith Jennings in Fortnight as making "this difficult work sound deceptively easy".

Sârbu also directed from the violin, and in 1982 he became the European Master Orchestra's conductor and soloist. He recorded violin concertos by Mozart as the conductor–soloist. His other notable recordings include the Sibelius Violin Concerto with the Hallé Orchestra conducted by Ole Schmidt (1981). Sârbu reconnected with his Romanian colleagues after the Romanian Revolution of 1989 and the end of communism; in 1995, he began a series of concerts in Romania, declaring that the Romanian public was his favourite audience in the entire world. In 1994–1995 he toured the United States, appearing at the Metropolitan Museum of Art. His Romanian honours include the George Enescu Prize (1995) and honorary membership of the Bucharest Academy of Music (1997); he was made honorary director of the National Radio Orchestra of Romania in 1997. Setting up a scholarship for Romanian music students, in December 1997 he also held a concert in honour of those killed during the Revolution. He continued to appear at various events in Romania, including with a guest appearance at a Bucharest gala in December 2014, where he accompanied nai virtuoso Gheorghe Zamfir. Sârbu died in a hospital in London, after a long illness, on 21 July 2024, at the age of 73.
