= Jean-Pierre Wallez =

French violinist and conductor

Jean-Pierre Wallez (born 18 March 1939) is a French violinist and conductor.

== Career ==
Wallez was born in Lille. He graduated in first place in violin and chamber music at the Conservatoire national supérieur de musique et de danse de Paris. He won the highest prize of the 1960 Paganini Competition in Genoa after winning three lesser prizes in previous years. Wallez was laureate of the International Competition in Geneva, as well as of the Marguerite Long-Jacques Thibaud Competition in Paris.

He was the first solo-violin of the Orchestre de Paris from 1975 to 1977. At the same time, from 1968 to 1983, he was the leader of the Ensemble Instrumental de France, touring extensively. While doing this, he continued his career as a soloist; he played with the Royal Concertgebouw Orchestra, Bernard Haitink, the Orchestre de Paris, Daniel Barenboim and Zubin Mehta, the Sydney Symphony Orchestra, the Helsinki Philharmonic Orchestra, the New Japan Philharmonic, and the NHK Symphony Orchestra in Tokyo. He also played with Arturo Benedetti Michelangeli, Isaac Stern, Henryk Szeryng, Jean-Pierre Rampal, Mstislav Rostropovich, Galina Vishnevskaya, Aldo Ciccolini, Paul Badura-Skoda, and Pierre Barbizet.

Wallez studied conducting with Pierre Dervaux and then with Sergiu Celibidache. He was the artistic director of the Festival de Musique d'Albi from its creation in 1974 to its end in 1990. Most of the productions were recorded and broadcast on television. In 1978, Wallez created the chamber orchestra Ensemble orchestral de Paris which toured Europe, South America, and Japan. The concerts included Bach, contemporary composers, symphonic works, chamber music, and a work with Pierre Boulez and the Ensemble InterContemporain.

In 1986, Wallez left the Ensemble Orchestral de Paris. He became the first guest conductor of the Orchestre Royal de Chambre de Wallonie in Belgium from 1987 to 1990, and of the Sønderjyllands Symfoniorkester in Denmark from 1990 to 1993. He was the musical director of the Örebro Chamber Orchestra in Sweden from 1992 to 1995. From 1994 to the end of 2000, he was the principal guest conductor of the Orchestra Ensemble Kanazawa in Japan. In 1996, he was also the first guest conductor of the Pasdeloup Orchestra in Paris. His repertoire includes operas by Mozart, Rossini, Bizet, Berlioz, Gounod, Britten, Offenbach.

Wallez recorded for Decca, EMI, CBS, Erato, Forlane, Ades and received awards for them, including the Grand Prix du Disque for the violin concertos by Jean-Marie Leclair, the Russian Concerto and the Concerto in F by Édouard Lalo, and a Gold Record for the Vivaldi Four Seasons with the Ensemble orchestral de Paris.

He teaches violin at the Conservatoire Supérieur de Musique in Geneva (virtuosity class) and tutors children aged 3 to 7 through the association he created, la Maison Internationale du Violon. Wallez is the artistic adviser of the Septembre Musical de l'Orne a festival in Normandy.

Wallez is Chevalier de la Légion d'honneur, Officier dans l'Ordre national du Mérite, Officier des Arts et Lettres, and received the Médaille de Vermeil (bronze) from the City of Paris.
