= Robert Davidovici =

Romanian-American violinist

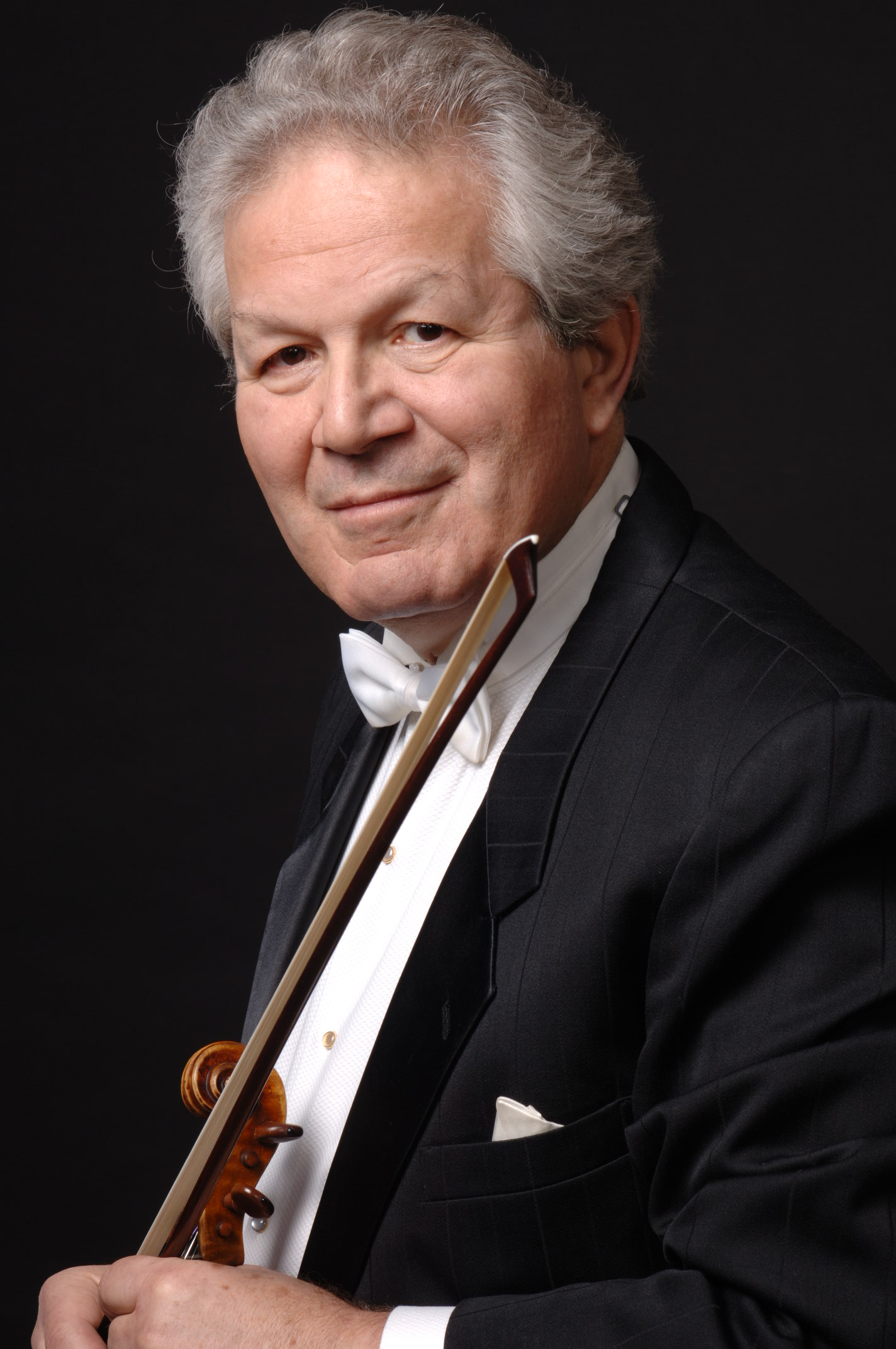
Robert Davidovici

Robert Davidovici (born 1946) is a Romanian-American violinist. He took First Prize honors in the Naumburg Competition in 1972. In 1983 Davidovici tied, with Maryvonne Le Dizès, for first place in the Carnegie Hall International American Music Competition. The prize was $77,000 and Davidovici received half.

Robert Davidovici was born in the Transylvania region of Romania. He studied the violin with Robert Pickler in Sydney, with David Oistrakh and at the Juilliard School in New York City. In 1967, he was a prize winner in the ABC Symphony Australia Young Performers Awards in Australia.

In 1983, Davidovici was the artist-in-residence at North Texas State University in Denton, Texas.

In 1997, while he was a concertmaster in the Vancouver Symphony Orchestra, Davidovici joined the faculty of Florida International University in Miami, Florida.

Davidovici is the founding artistic director of the Chamber Music Society of Fort Worth.

In February 2007, Davidovici was soloist at Lincoln Center's Avery Fisher Hall in the American premiere of the Kletzki Violin Concerto (1928) with the American Symphony Orchestra conducted by Leon Botstein, following which the New York Times commented on the "excellent " performance.

In October 2013, Mr. Davidovici performed the Beethoven Violin Concerto in London with the Royal Philharmonic Orchestra at Cadogan Hall, under Grzegorz Nowak, after which they recorded their 2nd CD, containing the Beethoven and Mendelssohn Violin Concerti.

In February 2015, Davidovici recorded the Brahms and Tschaikovsky Violin Concerti with the Royal Philharmonic Orchestra, under Nowak, as their 3rd CD collaboration. A few days later, they performed the Mendelssohn Violin Concerto in Cadogan Hall London concert series.
