= Il Cannone Guarnerius =

Violin made in 1743

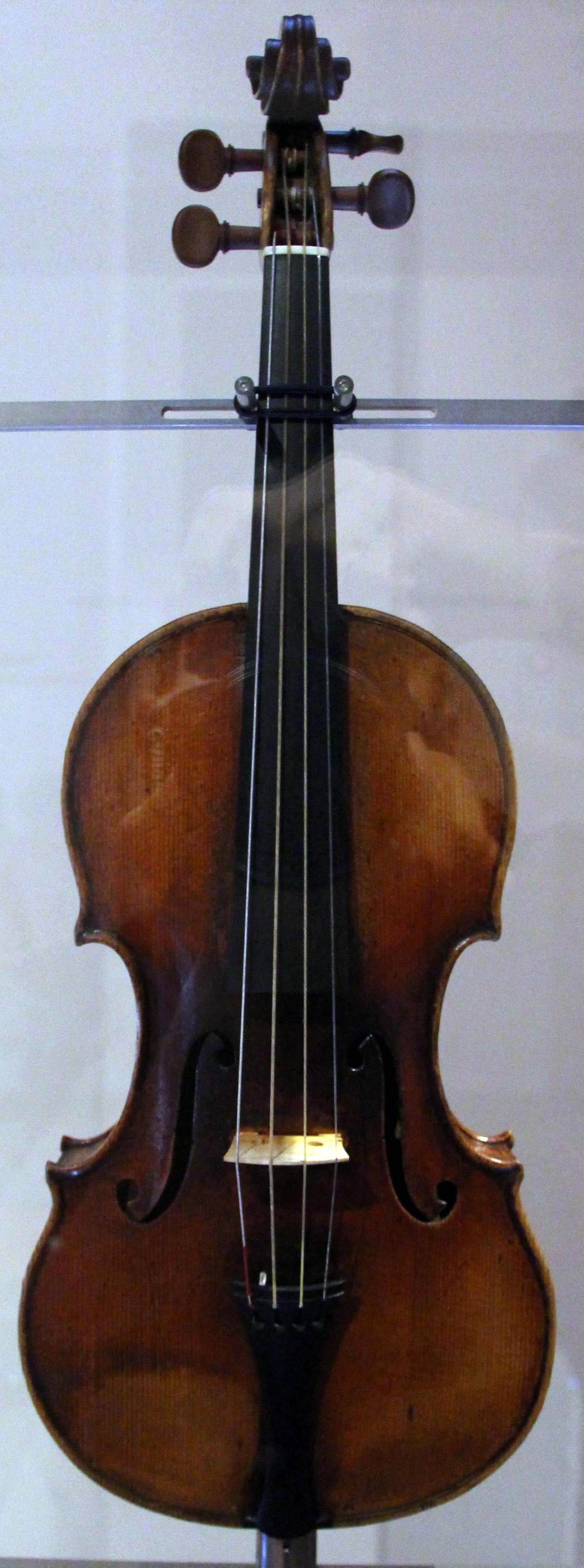
Il Cannone Guarnerius on exhibit at Palazzo Doria Tursi, Genova, Italy

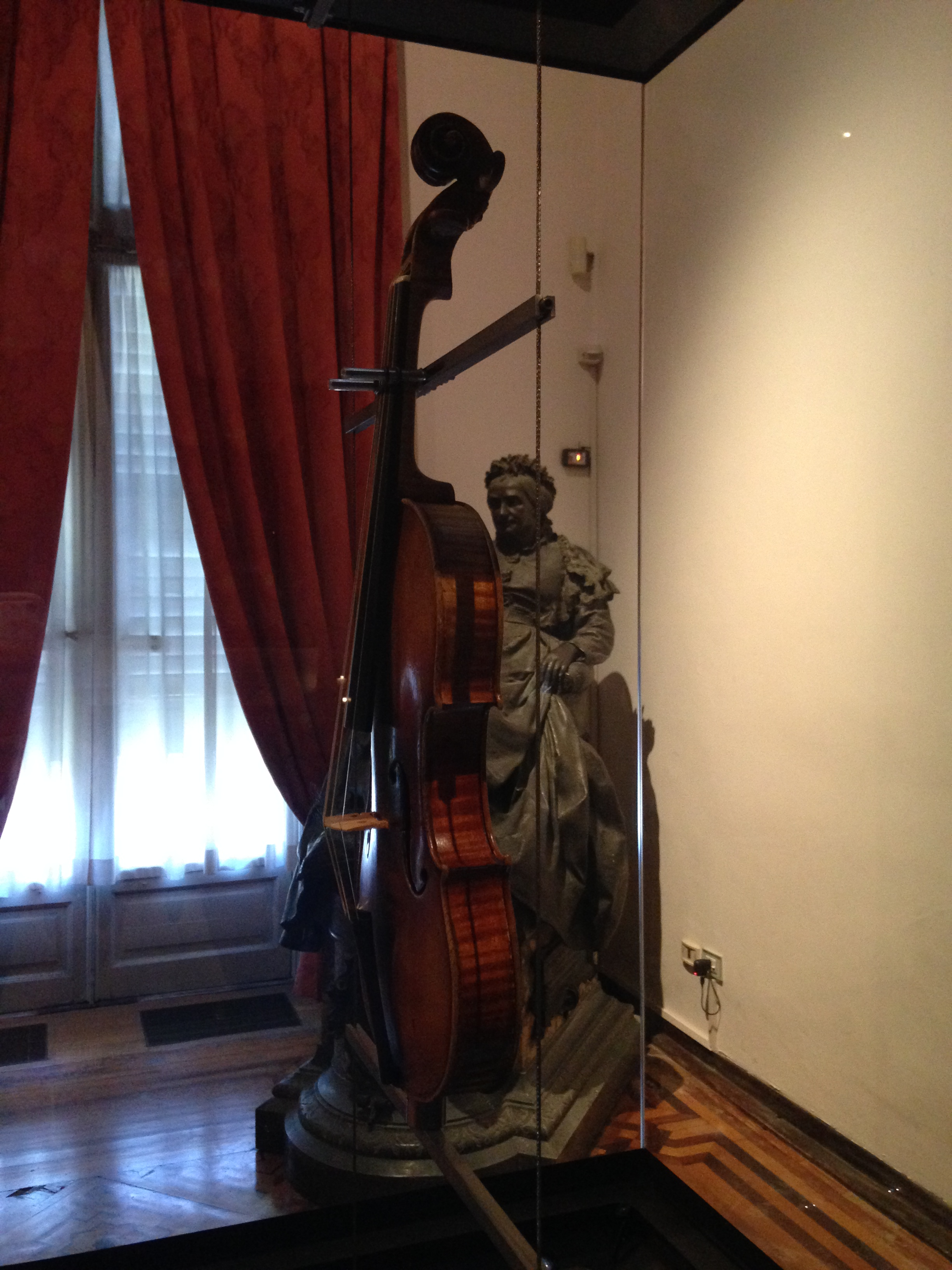
Il Cannone Guarnerius exhibited in the Paganini room at the Palazzo Doria-Tursi.

Il Cannone Guarnerius of 1743 is a violin created by the Italian luthier Giuseppe Bartolomeo Guarneri of Cremona (1698–1744).

Il Cannone is also known by the variants Il Cannone del Gesù, and the Cannon, often appended with Guarneri del Gesù, the Guarneri trademark. The violin received its name from a former owner, the Italian violin virtuoso Niccolò Paganini (1782–1840), because of its power and resonance. Since Paganini is closely associated with Il Cannone, it is common for the violin to be referenced as Il Cannone, ex Paganini.

Paganini lost a valuable Antonio Amati violin as a result of his penchant for voracious gambling. He was given a neglected Guarneri violin, a gift from an amateur violinist and businessman. Paganini played on this instrument for the rest of his life, fondly calling it “my cannon violin”, referring to the explosive sound that he could make it produce. He bequeathed it to the city of Genoa, Italy upon his death, and it is now considered a national treasure.

When in need of repair, Il Cannone would be sent to the Paris workshop of Jean Baptiste Vuillaume (1798–1875), the greatest luthier of his day. Not only did Vuillaume repair the Guarnerius, but he also made an exact replica. The copy was so exact that not even Paganini could distinguish one from the other. It was not until Paganini noticed subtle differences in tone that he could identify the original. Paganini presented the copy to his only student, Camillo Sivori, who would later bequeath the instrument to the Municipality of Genoa, where it is now exhibited with the original Il Cannone.

Il Cannone is exhibited alongside other Paganini memorabilia within the Paganini room of the Palazzo Doria-Tursi, the Genoa town hall. The original violin is maintained in playable condition, and is taken out and played monthly by its curator. The Cannone was played each year by the winner of the Premio Paganini contest for young violinists, which sees the Italian city attracting the best young violin performers (since 2002, the contest has been held every two years). On occasion, Il Cannone is loaned to musicians for performance. In 1996, violinist Eduard Schmieder was invited to give a recital on Il Cannone in Genoa at the Palazzo Ducale for the audience of 2000 (with pianist Valentina Lisitsa). On this rare occasion, a posthumous International Peace Prize ceremony was given by the Italian government to Yitzhak Rabin. Violinist Shlomo Mintz performed a special Il Cannone concert on Paganini's violin with the Limburg Symphony Orchestra of the Netherlands in 1997. In 1999, Eugene Fodor played Il Cannone at a special concert in San Francisco, California, USA. It was the furthest the violin had ever been from Italy. Conditions of its travel included a multi-million US dollar insurance policy and an armed escort of Italian police officers. The violin has been played several times by jazz violinist Regina Carter, who recorded an entire album with it, Paganini: After a Dream. In February 2006, Il Cannone was taken to London's Royal Academy of Music, where it was displayed and used at a festival devoted to Paganini.

The violin was the subject of the 2017 documentary Strad Style, in which director Stefan Avalos follows manic-depressive violin maker Daniel Houck in his dilapidated rural Ohio farm as he makes an Il Cannone replica for Razvan Stoica.

In 2019, the violin was sent to Columbus, Ohio, for a one-week display at the Columbus Museum of Art under the auspices of the Columbus-Genoa sister cities relationship. Columbus Symphony concertmaster Joanna Frankel performed a single concert on the instrument.

Italian violinist Francesca Dego recorded an album of Paganini-themed music with Cannone in 2019.

== See also ==
- Antonio Amati
- Antonio Stradivari
