= Râu Alb =

- Commune
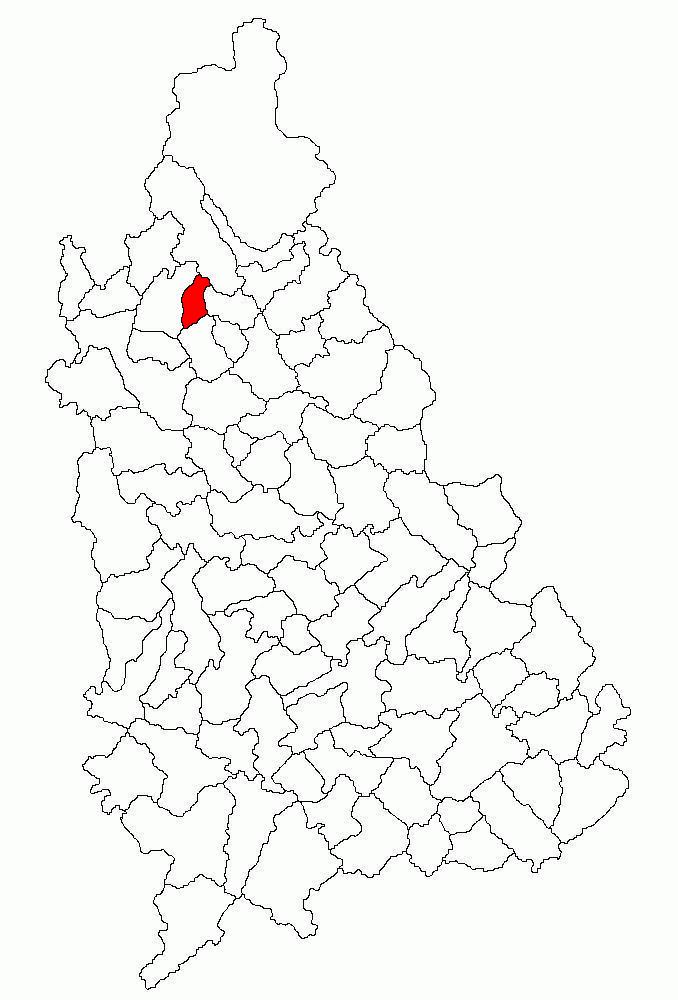
- Location in Dâmbovița County

- Location in Romania
- Coordinates: 45°9′N 25°21′E
- Country: Romania
- County: Dâmbovița

Government
  - Mayor (2020–2024): Cătălin Preda (PSD)
- Area: 24.69 km^{2} (9.53 sq mi)
- Elevation: 490 m (1,610 ft)
- Population (2021-12-01): 1,466
  - Density: 59/km^{2} (150/sq mi)
- Time zone: EET/EEST (UTC+2/+3)
- Postal code: 137027
- Area code: +(40) 245
- Vehicle reg.: DB
- Website: primariaraualb.ro

Râu Alb is a commune in Dâmbovița County, Muntenia, Romania, with a population of 1,466 as of 2021. It is composed of two villages, Râu Alb de Jos (the commune center) and Râu Alb de Sus. These were part of Bărbulețu Commune until 2004, when they were split off.

The commune is situated in the southern foothills of the Făgăraș Mountains, at a mean altitude of 490 m (1,610 ft), on the banks of the river Râul Alb. It is located in the northern part of Dâmbovița County, about 7 km (4.3 mi) away from the town of Pucioasa, and about 40 km (25 mi) from Târgoviște, the county seat. The commune has its own hospital, church, and police station.

Historical population
Year	Pop.	±%
2002	1,748	—
2011	1,564	−10.5%
2021	1,466	−6.3%
Source: Census data
