= St Hilary's School, Godalming =

Saint Hilary's School, Godalming

Location
- Holloway Hill; Godalming, Surrey, GU7 1RZ; England; 51.181611°N 0.618333°W

Information
- Type: Private prep school
- Motto: Non tibi sed omnibus (Not for you but for all)
- Religious affiliation: non-denominational
- Established: 1927
- Founder: Marjorie Hiorns
- Chair of Governors: Jackie Aliss
- Head: Duncan Sinclair
- Deputy Headmaster: Mark Parton
- Staff: c. 30 full-time teaching staff
- Age: 2 to 11
- Enrollment: 133 girls, 116 boys (2025)
- Houses: Mallory (Green), Hart (Yellow), Meath (Blue) and Jekyll (Red)
- Colours: Yellow, brown
- Former pupils: Old Hilarians
- Website: sthilarysschool.com

St Hilary's School is a private preparatory day school in Godalming, England, teaching around 250 girls and boys aged two to eleven. It holds the British Council's International School Award and in 2020 was named as Independent Prep School of the Year.

== History ==
In August 1927, Miss Marjorie Hiorns, a member of the National Froebel Union whose training was in music, founded St Hilary’s School in Tuesley Lane, Godalming, as an independent co-educational preparatory day school. In 1928, she was advertising "Individual Time-tables, Modern Methods, Art, Handwork, Poetry Speaking included". For some years, her father, F. J. Hiorns, a retired civil servant, taught literature in the school.

In 1936, the school moved a short distance to its present site on Holloway Hill, where it remains. The property now occupied by St Hilary’s is marked on maps of 1895 and 1934 as "Killcott". The Victorian England centre-forward and cricketer G. O. Smith (1872–1943) lived in the house and later became headmaster of Ludgrove School. A chimney bears the date 1870. The house has been greatly added to since 1936, as the school has grown. A nursery department was opened in 1946.

By 1959, the school was also taking some boarders. In 1968 there was a group of boarders aged between eight and twelve.

In 1966, St Hilary's became a charitable trust, with a Board of Governors. Miss Hiorns retired in July 1968, not long before reaching the age of seventy, and was presented with a pearl necklace. She remained a trustee of the St Hilary's School Trust until her death in 1995. The school celebrates her life every year, with a Hiorns Day in late September.

In July 1968, the school offered to make places available to Kent County Council at no charge, but its Education Committee turned down the offer without explanation.

In March 1971, the Surrey Girls' Chess Championship (for those under 18) took place at the school over two days.

In 1983, the school stated that it "bases its teaching on firm Christian principles and aims at producing kind, well-disciplined, and happy children".

For National Book Week 2003 and World Book Day 2018, children at the school dressed up as their favourite fictional character.

In 2007, almost eighty children at St Hilary's took LAMDA examinations in the Speaking of Verse and Prose, with 36 distinctions and 38 merits awarded.

In 2019, the British Council gave the school the accreditation of its International School Award, recognizing its commitment to international awareness and understanding across its teaching. Shortly after that, the school announced plans to become fully coeducational by 2022, bringing boys into all age groups.

In 2020, the school was named as Independent Prep School of the Year 2020 by the Independent Schools Parent magazine, when it was reported to be teaching 218 children. James Priory, headmaster of Tonbridge School, one of the judges, presented the award. The school was again shortlisted for the award in 2024.

By 2024, St Hilary's was taking both boys and girls between the ages of two and eleven.

In November 2024, there was a merger of governance with St Edmund's School, Hindhead, but with both schools to retain their identities.

In April 2025, the school announced the appointment of a new head, Duncan Sinclair, with effect from 1 September.

== Present day ==
=== Facilities ===
The school has a campus of 3.5 acres on Holloway Hill, Godalming, about half a mile from Godalming railway station. The facilities include a library, a computing suite, art studios, an all-weather sports pitch, the Hiorns Centre for drama and dance, a dedicated music wing, a performing arts hall, woodland with a Forest School, and an adventure play area. A unit called 'The Hive' is a Lego Innovation Studio, one of only sixty nationwide, with most others being in senior schools, colleges, and universities. The Hive promotes critical thinking, creativity, and communication, in Science, Technology, Engineering, Arts, and Mathematics.

=== Entry ===
Admission is non-selective. The school has two-form entry, with class sizes of about 15. Children can join the Nursery at the age of two or three, the Kindergarten at three, and the Reception class at four. This is followed by Year 1. Children also join the school at later ages.

Still saying it has a Christian ethos, the school now adds to this "We welcome pupils from all faiths and none."

=== Curriculum ===
St Hilary's has a broad curriculum, with the usual subjects, such as English, maths, history, and geography, together with philosophy, Latin, and chess. From Year 1, there are specialist teachers for French, music, art, physical education and games. By Year 6, much of the curriculum is taught by specialists.

After-school activities include Spanish, dancing, gym, golf, and a Young Magicians club.

=== Music ===
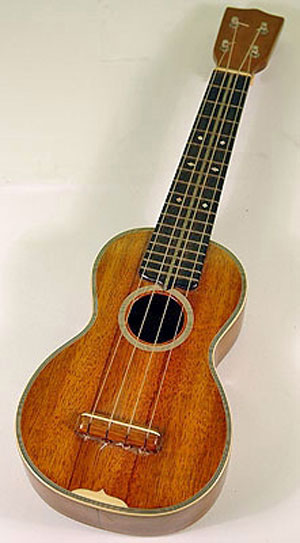
a ukulele

Music lessons are part of the school timetable. All children in Year 2 are taught to play the ukulele, then in Year 3 they all learn the violin. There are junior and senior choirs, an orchestra, a flute ensemble, and a brass band. Many children have tuition in their choice of musical instrument or in singing. There is also a choir for the staff and parents.

=== Sports ===
Both girls and boys play several team sports, netball, cricket, rugby, football, hockey, and handball, as well as athletics, swimming, tennis, badminton, and judo. There is mixed football, cricket, and netball. From Year 2 on, matches are played against other schools. In netball, St Hilary’s regularly appears in the IAPS national finals. Children have also reached the National Championships finals of the English Schools Swimming Association.

== Notable Old Hilarians ==
- Jenny Seagrove (born 1957), actress
- Lucy Parham (born 1966), concert pianist
- David Farr (born 1969), theatre director
- Victoria Hamilton (born 1971), actress
- Andrew Haveron (born 1975), violinist
- Lucy Prebble (born 1980), playwright
