= Harold Wippler =

American violinist (1928–2022)

Harold Wippler (September 19, 1928 – October 8, 2022) was an American violinist and teacher from Denver. Wippler played as concertmaster for the Denver Symphony Orchestra, now the Colorado Symphony Orchestra, with his wife Charleen, whom he married in August 1951. The two often played with the Central City Opera orchestra and spent three years in the early 1950s with the Kansas City Philharmonic, where Harold was also concertmaster. Attending the Curtis Institute of Music after winning the L.A. Concerto Competition, he studied under Efrem Zimbalist. During his career he collaborated and recorded with noted violinists such as Jascha Heifetz. Wippler taught multiple international competition winners, most notably Eugene Fodor, who was his student from 1958 to 1968.
