= Lucy Parham =

British concert pianist and academic

- Born: 1966 (age 59–60)
- Origin: Guildford, Surrey, England
- Genres: Classical
- Occupations: Pianist, professor
- Instrument: Piano
- Years active: 1984–present

Lucy Parham (born 1966) is a British concert pianist and academic. She is a professor at The Guildhall School of Music and Drama. In 1984 she won Piano Class BBC Young Musician.

== Biography ==
Parham grew up in Guildford, Surrey. She was educated at St Hilary's School, Godalming, Bedales School, Hampshire, and the Guildhall School of Music and Drama under the concert pianist Professor Joan Havill.

Parham has played in the UK and internationally, and is a regular contributor for BBC Radio 3. She has performed as a concerto soloist with The London Philharmonic, Royal Philharmonic, Royal Liverpool Philharmonic, The Halle, RTE Orchestra, Royal Scottish National Orchestra, Russian State Symphony Orchestra and on three tours with the Sofia Philharmonic Orchestra and the Polish National Radio Symphony Orchestra.

In 2002 she joined the BBC Concert Orchestra and conductor Barry Wordsworth on a six-week 50th anniversary tour of the US.

Parham is known for her Composer Portrait series of concerts and her interpretation of the music of Robert Schumann and Clara Schumann. She produced I Clara, to coincide with the bicentenary of Clara Schumann's birth in 2019. She has also produced and performed Composer Portraits of Claude Debussy and Chopin

She was artistic director of the Kings Place Coffee Concerts and of the Guildhall Spring Festival.

Frequent collaborators include actors Juliet Stevenson, Harriet Walter, Sheila Hancock and Henry Goodman.
