= Maryvonne Le Dizès =

French violinist (1940–2024)

- Le Dizès, c. 2000
- Born: 25 June 1940; Quimper, German-occupied France
- Died: 9 August 2024 (aged 84)
- Occupation: Classical violinist
- Organizations: Ensemble intercontemporain; Regional Conservatory of Boulogne-Billancourt

Maryvonne Le Dizès (25 June 1940 – 9 August 2024), also known as Maryvonne Le Dizès-Richard, was a French violinist and academic teacher. She is best known for her work on contemporary classical music, as violinist of the Ensemble intercontemporain in Paris from 1979 for over twenty years. Le Dizès collaborated with composers such as Pierre Boulez and György Ligeti, and commissioned new chamber music works. She taught at the Regional Conservatory of Boulogne-Billancourt in Paris from 1977.

== Life and career ==
Maryvonne Le Dizès was born on 25 June 1940, in Quimper, France. During her studies at the Conservatoire de Paris, she received awards for both solo performances and for chamber music. In 1962, she was the first woman to achieve first prize at the Paganini Competition.

She moved to the United States for two years because of her husband's career, where she became the first woman and the first foreigner to enter the Carnegie Hall Competition. At this time she performed less, in order to focus on raising her children. Afterwards, she regained her technique by going over Bach's sonatas and partitas for violin solo, chamber music works, and concertos.

Le Dizès became a violinist with the Ensemble intercontemporain in Paris in 1979, after which she held the post for more than twenty years. During this time she collaborated with composers such as Pierre Boulez and György Ligeti, whose Violin Concerto and Trio for Piano, Violin, and Horn she performed with the ensemble. She recorded works by Olivier Messiaen, Iannis Xenakis, Luciano Berio, Elliott Carter, and others. Her commissions of new compositions included a trio for saxophone, trombone, and violin by Gilbert Amy, a string trio by Jean-Baptiste Devillers, and Ommaggio, an homage to Tiepolo for solo violin by Philippe Fénelon.

From 1977 she taught at the Regional Conservatory of Boulogne-Billancourt in Paris, focusing on contemporary music. While there, she said: "Teaching is as vital to me as playing my instrument. I cannot teach if I do not play, and I cannot play without teaching." She was, with Robert Davidovici, winner of the 1983 Carnegie Hall International American Music Competition. Le Dizés died on 9 August 2024.

== Recordings ==
- Twentieth Century Works for Violin (1986), solo works by Luciano Berio and Bruno Maderna, works for violin and piano by Aaron Copland, Charles Ives, Arnold Schoenberg and Olivier Messiaen, with pianist Jean-Claude Henriot, Adda
- Hidden Sparks (1997), New World Records
- Bartók, Berg, Stravinsky, Amy: Trios (2002), Musidisc
- Bartók: Oeuvres pour violon et piano (2002), Musidisc
- Messiaen: Quatuor pour la fin du Temps (2012), Adda
