= Kevin Zhu (academic) =

Business Professor, Consultant and Investor

Kevin Zhu earned his Ph.D. degree from Stanford University and then became a business professor in the area of innovation and transformation. His work focuses on digital transformation in the business world (e.g., how new businesses replace the old), e-commerce, user community, information transparency, digital markets, and how these forces work together to drive productivity and job growth as well as transform the "old economy," all with a common goal to help shape a better future for humanity.

Expert of digital strategy and transformation, he does research, teaching, investing, executive training, and sometimes serves as a consultant, advisor and expert witness by invitation. His expertise includes: data, models and analytics; digital transformation of businesses; digital healthcare; executive training; consulting and advisory.

== Career ==
Kevin Zhu's work is transparent to the public. His research has been published in the top business-academic journals such as Management Science, Marketing Science, Information Systems Research, Decision Science, and MIS Quarterly, as well as in a book Global E-Commerce (Cambridge University Press). His work-in-progress is also shared publicly via SSRN (an open platform of more than 3 million users worldwide). He has served the profession by editorial positions at the top academic journals and co-chaired major conferences. He has been invited by many public and private institutions around the world, and has made more than 100 speeches and presentations in academic conferences and industry workshops.

For those who are less familiar with business school research, their work typically leads to transparent publications in scholarly journals or books (usually no trade secret or intellectual property involved). Currently Dr. Zhu has no federal grants, has no labs, and does not receive funding from any governmental agencies. He passes his knowledge to the public and works to support students to help them become successful as next-generation scholars or business leaders.

== Achievements and honors ==
Kevin Zhu is widely recognized in the world by more than 17000 citations with high impact per Google Scholar (with h-index of 35 and i10-index 44), by 5 Best Paper Awards as voted by peer scholars, the Distinguished Fellow Award in the field, and the U.S. National Science Foundation's CAREER Award. Among ~3000 scholars in his profession, he was ranked the top 17th in the world as measured by research productivity (CAIS) and top 10th per more recent research impact and citations.
