= Lü Siqing =

Chinese violinist

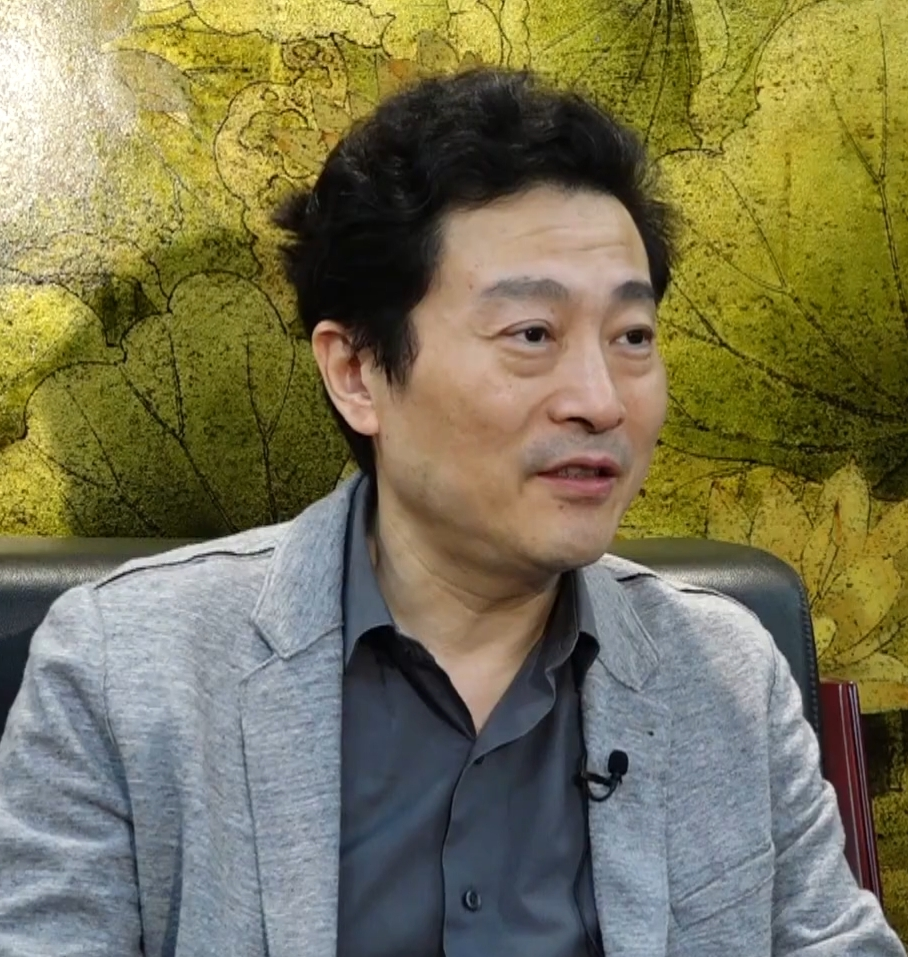
- Lü Siqing in 2023

Background information
- Born: 26 November 1969; Qingdao,Shandong
- Origin: China
- Occupation: Violinist
- Instrument: Violin

Lü Siqing
- Traditional Chinese: 呂思清
- Simplified Chinese: 吕思清
Transcriptions
Standard Mandarin
- Hanyu Pinyin: Lǚ Sīqīng
- IPA: [lỳ sɹ̩́.tɕʰíŋ]

Lü Siqing (Chinese: 吕思清; born 26 November 1969) is a Chinese violinist. He was the first Asian violinist to win the first prize at the Paganini Competition in 1987.

== Biography ==
Lü was born in 1969 in Qingdao, Shandong, China. As a child he was taught by the famous violinist Sheng Zhongguo. He began studying the violin at the age of four, and at age eight, he was accepted at the Central Conservatory of Music and became the youngest person to study there.

When he was 11, Lü was selected by Yehudi Menuhin to study at the Yehudi Menuhin School in Surrey, England. After returning to China in 1985, he appeared as a member of several major Chinese orchestras, and made guest appearances on Chinese television programmes, including the Chinese New Year Show watched by over one billion people. In 1994, he performed at the Beijing Concert Hall in front of the President of China. He currently holds the post of Director of the Violin Department at Naxos International, the CD company which records and distributes his music. Lü has received recognition as a professional violinist. In 1987, he won the first prize of the Paganini Competition; and in 1999, he was the winner of the Web Concert Hall International Competition.

== Notable recordings ==
- Butterfly Lovers' Violin Concerto (Naxos reference 8.006)
- Butterfly Lovers' Violin Concerto (Naxos reference 8.225940)
- Marco Polo Sampler (Naxos reference MP-2000-1/2HDCD)
- Felix Mendelssohn: Violin Concerto in E Minor (Naxos reference 8.007)
- Pablo de Sarasate: Violin Showpieces Vol. 1 (Naxos reference 8.225961HDCD)
- Traumerei: Romantic Violin Favourites (Naxos reference 8.225936)
- Antonio Vivaldi: The Four Seasons (Naxos reference 8.225955HDCD)
