= Tanja Becker-Bender =

German violinist (born 1978)

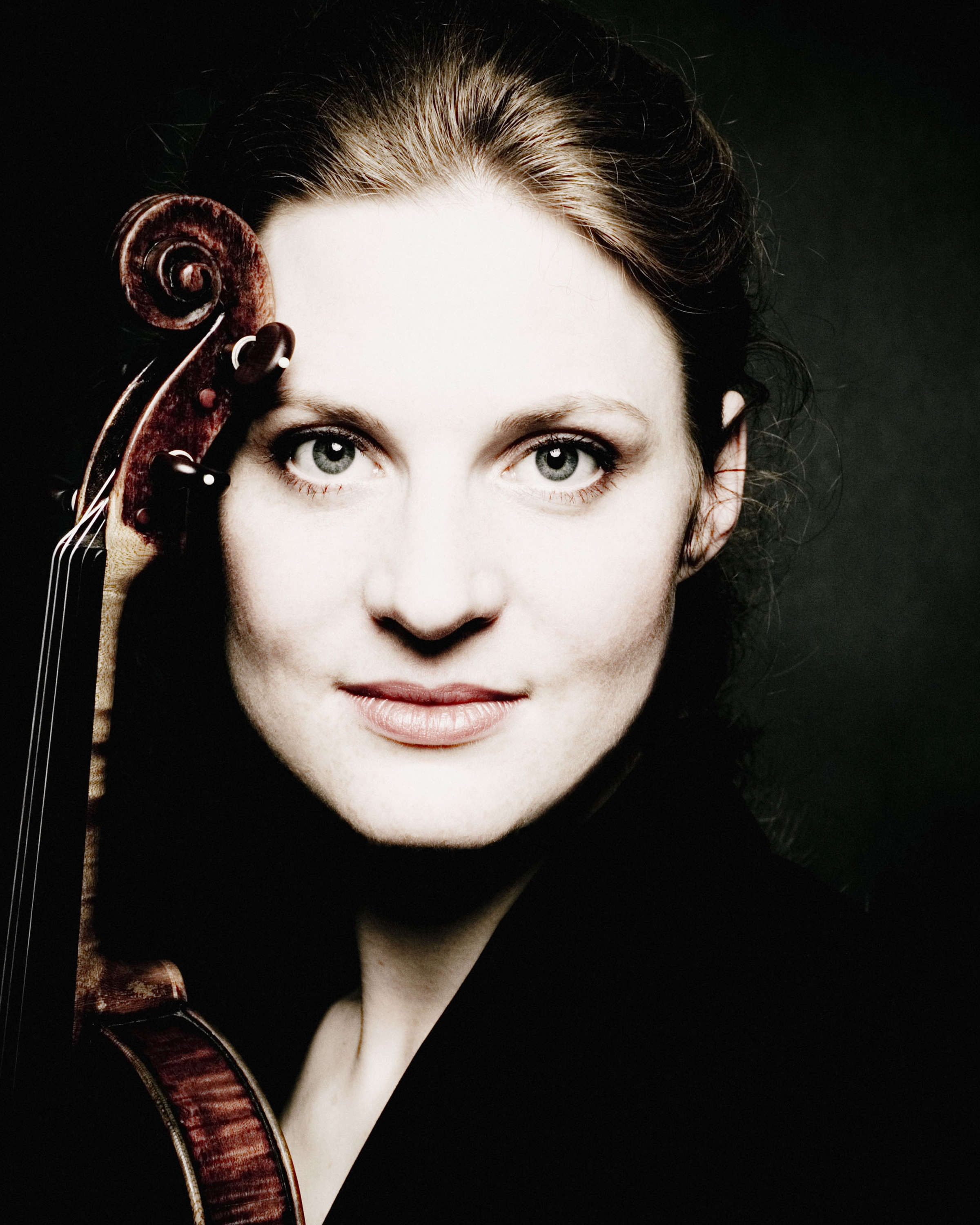
- Becker-Bender
- Born: 11 February 1978 (age 48); Stuttgart
- Education: Juilliard School; Mozarteum University of Salzburg
- Occupation: violinist

Tanja Becker-Bender (born 11 February 1978) is a German violinist. She lives in Berlin and Hamburg.

== Musical career ==
Born in Stuttgart, Becker-Bender has performed since age of eleven as a soloist on international stages under the baton of Kurt Masur, Gerd Albrecht, Hubert Soudant and Fabio Luisi with renowned orchestras, such as the Stuttgart Radio Symphony Orchestra, the Berlin Konzerthaus Orchestra, the Jerusalem Symphony Orchestra, the Orchestre de la Suisse Romande and the Tokyo Philharmonic Orchestra. As a chamber musician she appeared in festivals together with Gidon Kremer, Yuri Bashmet, Boris Pergamenschikow and Arnold Steinhardt.

Becker-Bender won prizes and awards in national and international competitions such as in Geneva (Switzerland, CIEM), Tokyo (Bunkamura Orchard Hall Award), Belgium (Concours International de Musique de Chimay), Gorizia (Italy, Premio Rodolfo Lipizer), Genoa (Italy, Premio Nicolò Paganini), Greensboro (North Carolina, Eastern Music Festival) and in Houston (Texas, Houston Symphony League Award).

== Education ==
She received her instrumental education by Helmut Zehetmair at the Mozarteum University of Salzburg, Wolfgang Marschner in Freiburg, Wilhelm Melcher in Stuttgart, by David Takeno at the Guildhall School of Music and Drama in London and Günter Pichler at the University of Music and Performing Arts in Vienna. She completed her studies by the Master of Music and the Artist Diploma with Robert Mann at the Juilliard School in New York.

== Academic career ==
Becker-Bender was director in the violin program of the European American Musical Alliance (EAMA) 2004 and 2005 in Paris.

In 2006, Becker-Bender was appointed Professor of Violin at the University of Music Saar in Saarbrücken, Germany, succeeding Maxim Vengerov. In spring 2009, she received an appointment for a professorship at the University of Music and Theater Hamburg and another such appointment at the University of Music and Performing Arts in Vienna. She started her teaching activity as professor of Violin at the University of Music and Theater Hamburg in winter term 2009/2010. In 2011, she was elected for a member of the Freie Akademie der Künste Hamburg.

== Discography ==
- Dvořák: Works for violin and piano, Pavane, Belgium, ADW 7418 (1999)
- Albinoni: Concertos for violin, Brilliant Classics, Netherlands, 92791 (2005) – CD Nr. 3
- Beethoven: Piano trio, vol. 1 (with Melcher-Trio), ARS Production, Germany, ARS 38 467 (2007)
- Paganini: 24 Caprices for Solo Violin, Hyperion, London, CDA 67763 (2009) – "Editor's Choice" award by the English Classical Music Magazine Gramophone and Classic FM
- Jean Perrin (1920–1988): Violin Concerto (1983), DIVOX Excellence, Germany, CDX 209066 (2010)
- Erwin Schulhoff (1894–1942): Works for violin and piano, Hyperion, London, CDA 67833 (February 2011) – "Disc of the Month" by the BBC Music Magazine March 2011
- Max Reger (1873–1916), Violin Concerto in A major, Op 101, and Two Romances for violin and small orchestra, Op 50 – "International Record Review 'Outstanding' Award" (February 2012)
- Ottorino Respighi (1879–1936), Violin Sonatas & Pieces
- Paul Hindemith (1895–1963): Violin Sonatas et al., Hyperion, London CDA 68014 (November 2013)
- Ferruccio Busoni (1866–1924): Violin Concerto in D major, Op 35a, and (arr.) Benedictus from Missa Solemnis, Op 123, by L.v. Beethoven, (first recording) – Richard Strauss (1864–1949): Violin Concerto in D minor, Op 8, Hyperion, London, CDA 68044 (August 2014), Longlist 4/2014 "Preis der deutschen Schallplattenkritik"
- Béla Bartók (1881–1945): The complete Works for Violin and Piano, Sonata for Violin solo, Piano Sonata, SWR>>music Stuttgart, Germany – Naxos Germany (2 CDs), CD-No. SWR 19003 CD (January 2016), Longlist 2/2016 "Preis der deutschen Schallplattenkritik"
- Friedrich Eck (1767–1838): Three Violin Concertos, No. 1 in E major, No. 2 in G major, No. 5 in A major, cpo 777975 -2, Coproduction with Südwestrundfunk, SWR2, Germany (January 2024)
