= Bărbulețu =

- Commune
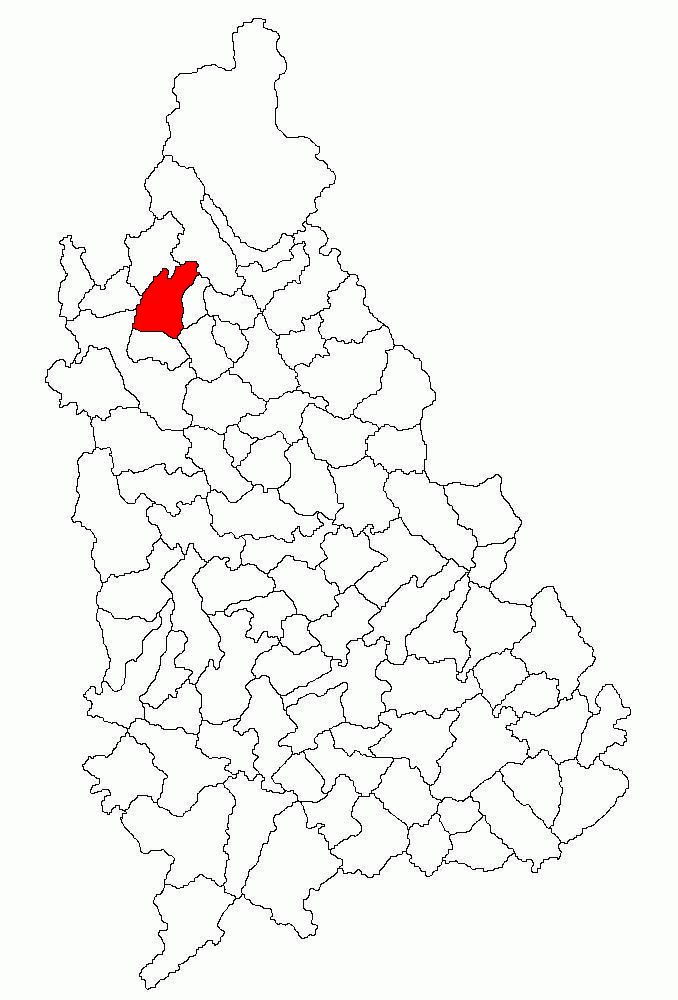
- Location in Dâmbovița County

- Location in Romania
- Coordinates: 45°8′N 25°18′E
- Country: Romania
- County: Dâmbovița

Government
  - Mayor (2020–2024): Marian Alexe (PSD)
- Area: 24.66 km^{2} (9.52 sq mi)
- Elevation: 520 m (1,710 ft)
- Population (2021-12-01): 2,005
  - Density: 81/km^{2} (210/sq mi)
- Time zone: EET/EEST (UTC+2/+3)
- Postal code: 137020
- Area code: +(40) 245
- Vehicle reg.: DB
- Website: primariabarbuletu.ro

Bărbulețu is a commune in Dâmbovița County, Muntenia, Romania. It is composed of three villages: Bărbulețu, Cetățuia, and Gura Bărbulețului. It included seven other villages until 2004, when they were split off to form Pietrari and Râu Alb Communes.

Historical population
Year	Pop.	±%
2002	2,442	—
2011	2,361	−3.3%
2021	2,005	−15.1%
Source: Census data
