= Romano Crivici =

Australian musician

Romano Crivici (1953) is an Australian violinist, pianist and composer.

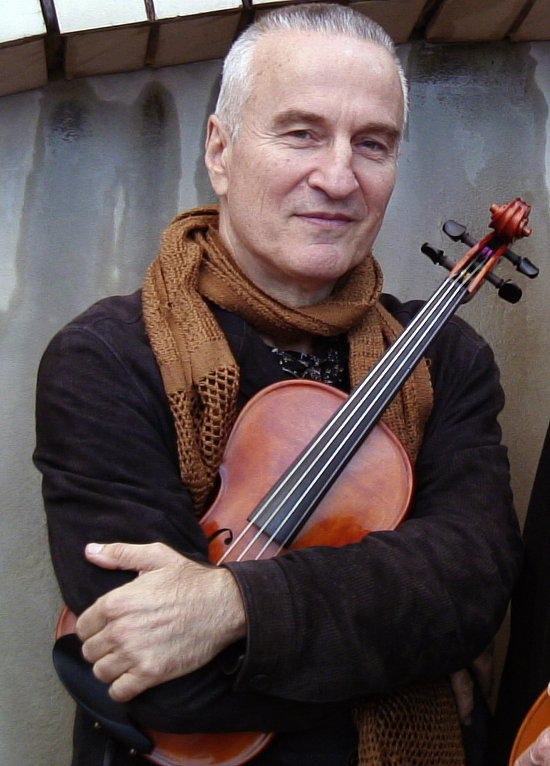
Romano Crivici

Crivici, a former member of the Sydney Symphony Orchestra and the New England String Quartet, has also worked as a repetiteur and conductor. However it has been his work as composer, director and violinist with his group Elektra String Quartet and Elektra Collektiv, that has made a unique contribution.

The Elektra String Quartet is best known for performing works by Crivici himself, as well as other Australian composers such as Nigel Westlake, Robert Davidson, Roger Dean, Mathew Hindson, Paul Stanhope, Martin Armiger, Ross Edwards and other contemporary works.

== Elektra String Quartet ==
Romano Crivici formed the Elektra String Quartet in 1990. It came to be considered one of Australia's most innovative and prolific ensembles in the contemporary music scene.

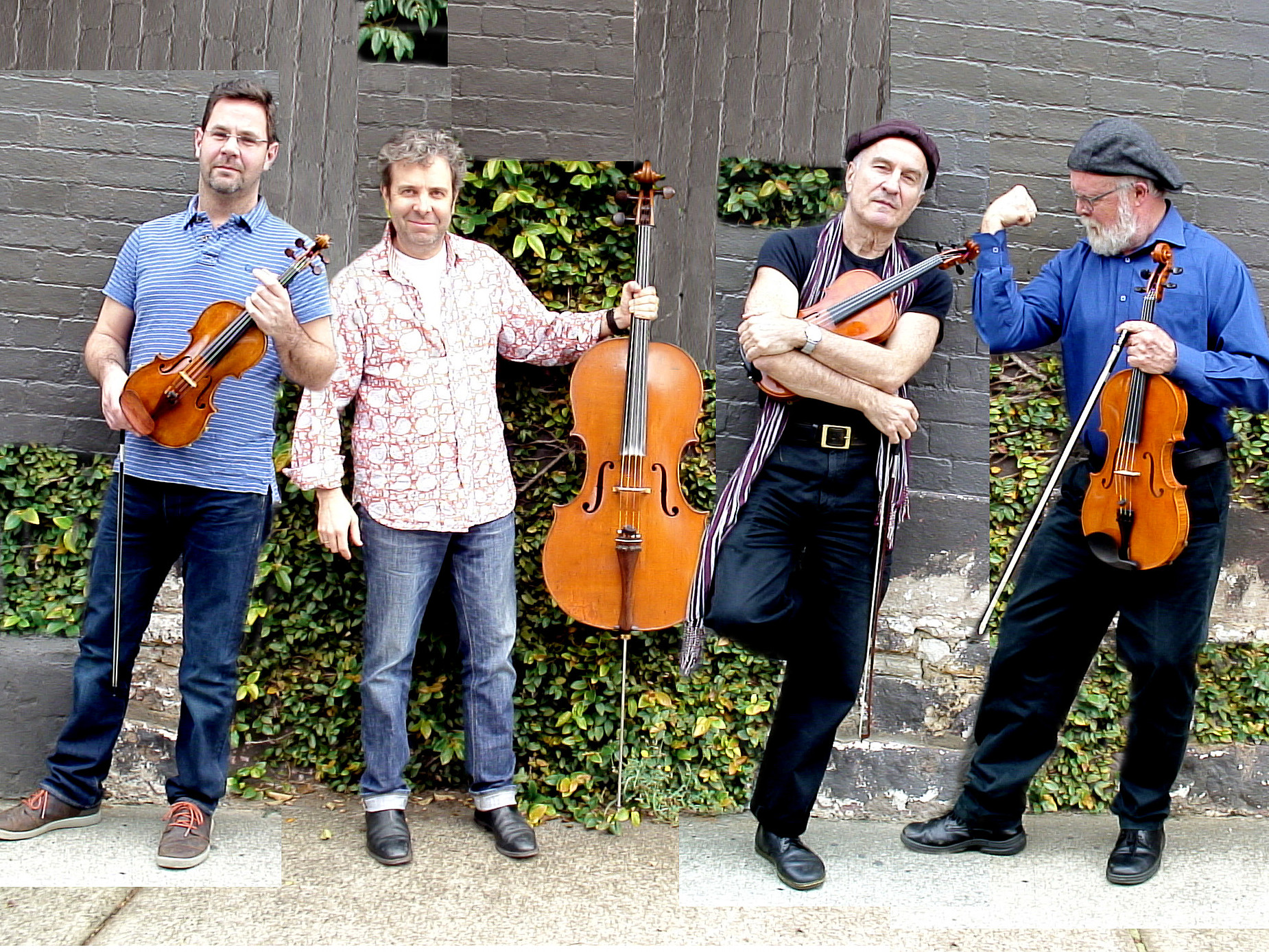
Elektra String Quartet in 2015. Andrew Haveron, Adrian Wallis, Romano Crivici & Robert Harris

Performing both nationally and internationally with tours of South America and Europe, it presented a range of music with particular focus on Australian composers, and the compositions of its director and founder, Romano Crivici.

== Selected works ==
- String Quartet #5 Gregorian Funk 2015
- String Quartet #4 Undercurrents 2105
- Slavic Grooves & Meditations 2015 for flute, viola, piano, bass, percussion
- Reflections on Life Death & Transience 2014 for violin, viola & poet
- If Leaves Could Sing 2017 for piano
- Mantra 2004 for bass clarinet & string quartet

== Recordings ==
- Ebb & Flow 2017 No Self Records
- Stringlines 2012 Australian Broadcasting Corporation (ABC) Classics
- Flat Earth 2001 Australian Broadcasting Corporation (ABC) Classics
- Timeless 1999 No Self Records
- Luminous 1997 No Self Records
- Moving On 1993 Larrikan Records
