= Pietrari, Dâmbovița =

Pietrari
- Commune
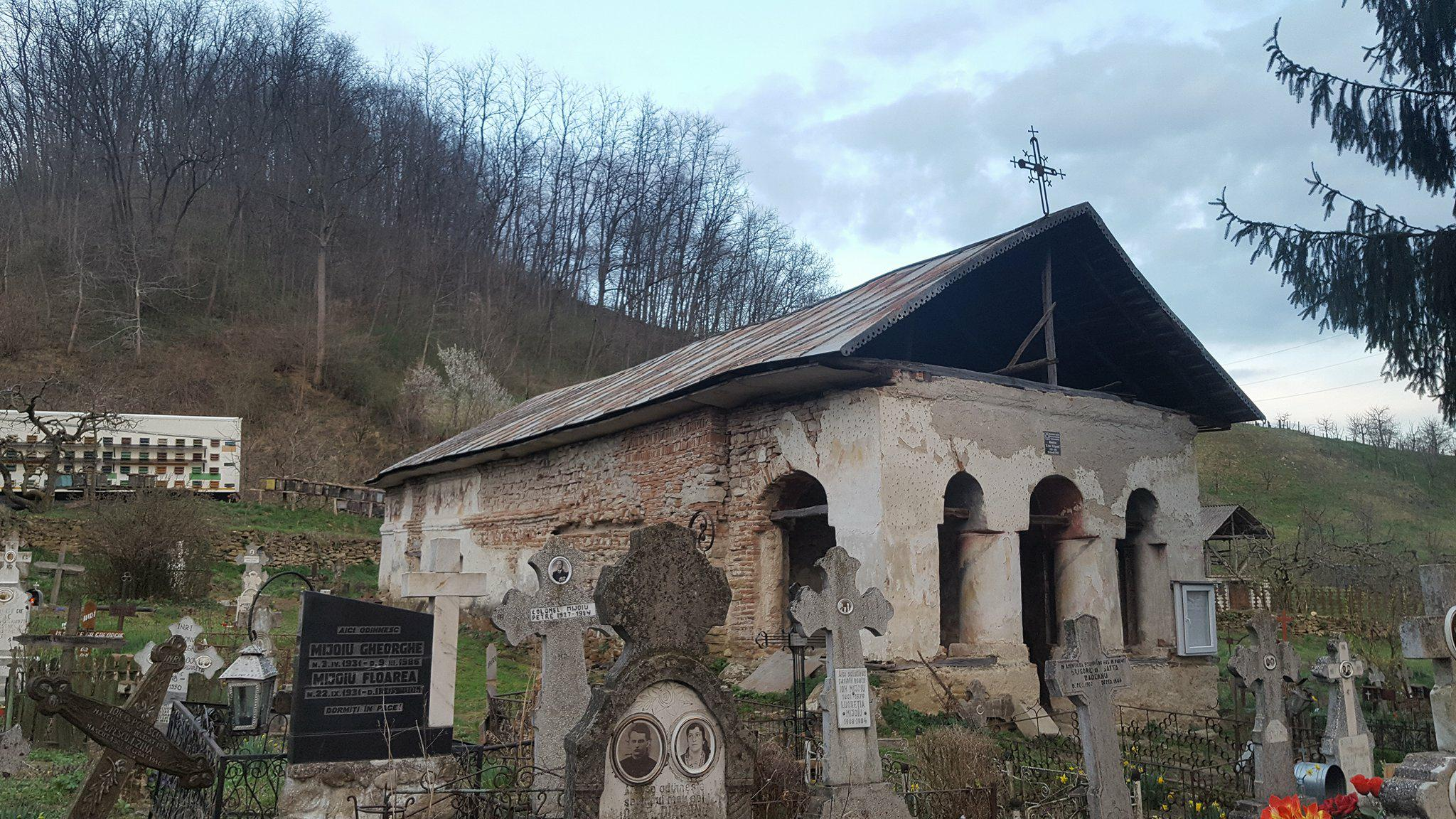
- Church in Pietrari

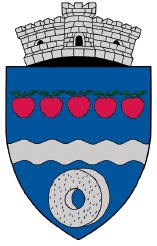
- Coat of arms

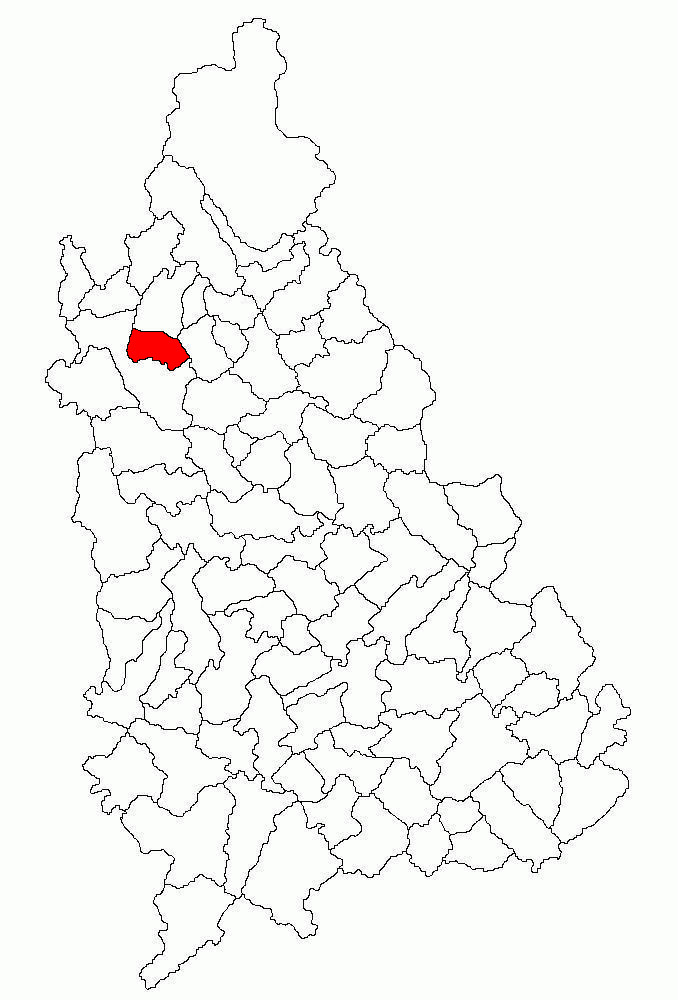
- Location in Dâmbovița County

- Location in Romania
- Coordinates: 45°05′37″N 25°17′34″E
- Country: Romania
- County: Dâmbovița

Government
  - Mayor (2020–2024): Gheorghe Neacșu (PSD)
- Area: 25.89 km^{2} (10.00 sq mi)
- Elevation: 424 m (1,391 ft)
- Population (2021-12-01): 2,186
  - Density: 84.43/km^{2} (218.7/sq mi)
- Time zone: UTC+02:00 (EET)
  - Summer (DST): UTC+03:00 (EEST)
- Postal code: 137026
- Area code: +(40) 245
- Vehicle reg.: DB
- Website: primariapietrari.ro

Pietrari is a commune in Dâmbovița County, Muntenia, Romania. It is composed of five villages: Aluniș, După Deal, Pietrari, Șipot, and Valea. These were part of Bărbulețu Commune until 2004, when they were split off.

Historical population
Year	Pop.	±%
2002	2,658	—
2011	2,533	−4.7%
2021	2,186	−13.7%
Source: Census data

== Natives ==
- Eugene Sârbu (1950–2024), classical violinist
