= Eugene Fodor (violinist) =

American classical violinist (1950–2011)

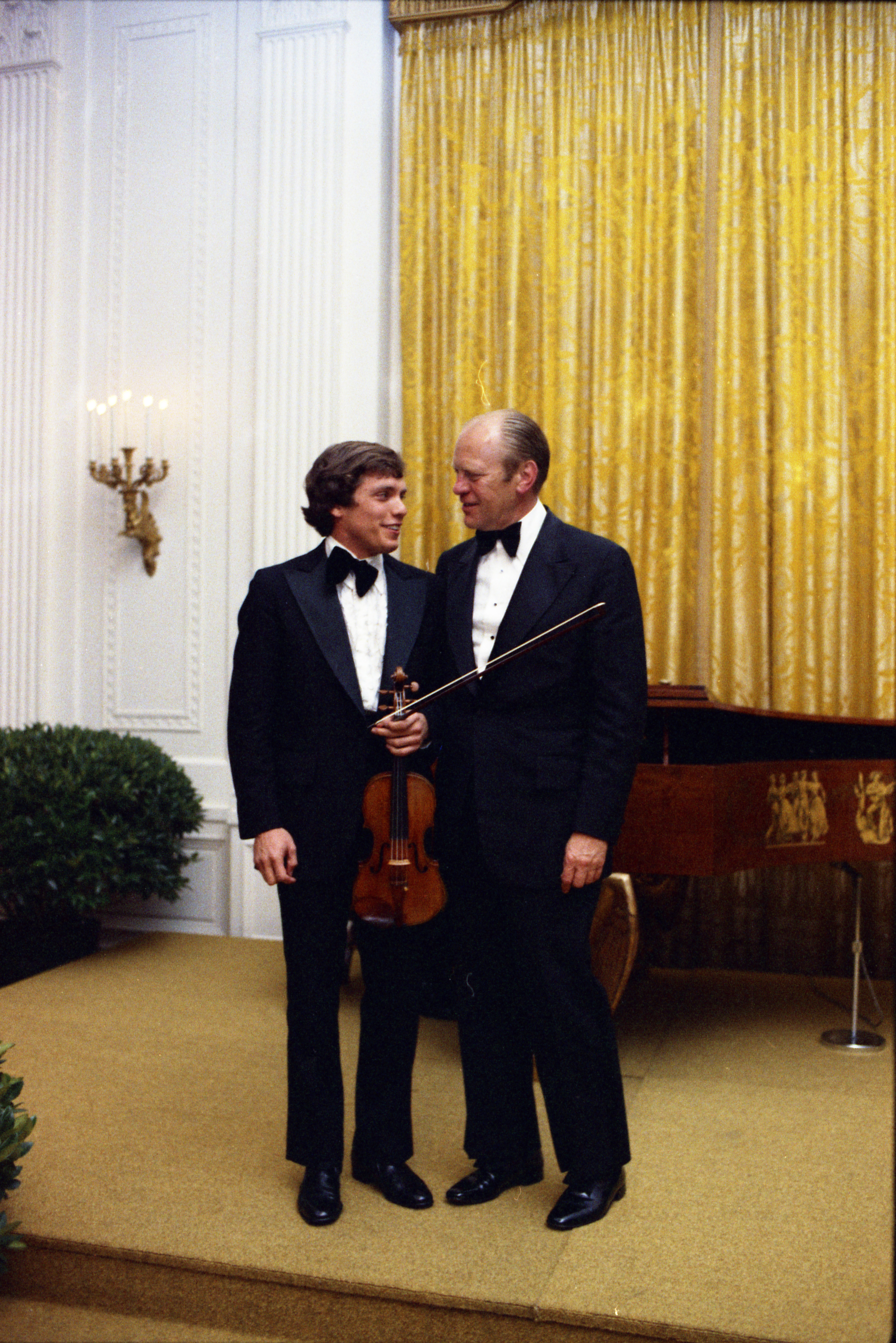
- Fodor (left) with President Gerald Ford at the White House, 1974.

Background information
- Born: Eugene Nicholas Fodor, Jr. March 5, 1950; Denver, Colorado
- Died: February 26, 2011 (aged 60) Arlington County, Virginia
- Instruments: violin

Eugene Nicholas Fodor Jr. (March 5, 1950 – February 26, 2011) was an American classical violinist.

Fodor was born in Denver, Colorado. His first 10 years of study were with Harold Wippler, who taught him from 1958 until 1968. Wippler observed that "It was very apparent that he had exceptional talent. Not just technical talent but a great, unusual understanding of music." He then studied at the Juilliard School in New York City, Indiana University Bloomington and the University of Southern California, where his teachers included Ivan Galamian, Josef Gingold and Jascha Heifetz, respectively.

Fodor made his solo debut with the Denver Symphony Orchestra at the age of 10, playing Max Bruch's Violin Concerto No. 1, and began touring as a soloist while still a young teenager.

Fodor won numerous national contests before the age of 17, including First Prize in both the Merriweather Post Competition in Columbia, Maryland and the Young Musicians Foundation Competition in Los Angeles.

Fodor went on to win first prize in the Paganini Competition in Italy in 1972, at the age of 22. It was this win that gained him widespread public attention. He achieved the highest prize awarded (second prize, shared with two other violinists since first prize was not awarded that year) in the International Tchaikovsky Competition in 1974 in Moscow, Russia. This award raised his profile further, as an American sharing the top Soviet prize during the height of the Cold War. He signed a recording contract with RCA Red Seal and was a frequent guest on The Tonight Show Starring Johnny Carson. Fodor was also awarded the European Soloist award "Prix Europeen du Soliste" in January 1999.

Fodor appeared on the television comedy program SCTV, broadcast on NBC on 20 November 1981 in a parody of the Joan Crawford movie Humoresque called New York Rhapsody.

Fodor's career began to decline in the 1980s; an arrest for drug possession on Martha's Vineyard in 1989 resulted in negative publicity. Though he continued to make recordings and appear in concert until shortly before his death, his appearances were no longer high-profile, such as he had made in the years following his Moscow win. After years of battling alcohol and drug addiction, Fodor died from cirrhosis in Arlington County, Virginia, on February 26, 2011, at the age of 60. His first marriage was to Susan Davis in 1978. They divorced in 1986. His second marriage to Sally Swedlund, whom he married in 1996, also ended in divorce in 2009. He remarried Ms. Davis in November 2010. He and Susan had three children and two grandchildren.

== Selected discography ==
- Solos and showpieces: Tchaikovsky, Ysaÿe, Paganini, Wieniaski, Prokofiev (RCA Red Seal ARL1-0735) 1974
- Eugene Fodor plays Paganini, Sarasate, Vitali (RCA Red Seal ARL1-1672) 1975
- Eugene Fodor plays Fritz Kreisler (RCA Red Seal ARL1-2365) 1977
- Tchaikovsky: Violin Concerto No. 1 in D major, Op. 35/ Saint-Saëns: Introduction and Rondo Capriccioso, Op. 28 - Erich Leinsdorf/New Philharmonia Orchestra (RCA Red Seal ARL1-0781) 1974
- Paganini: Concerto No.1 in D, Op.64/Mendelssohn Violin Concerto - Peter Maag/New Philharmonia Orchestra (RCA Red Seal ARL1-1565) 1975
- Aram Khachaturian: Violin Concerto/Glazounov: Concerto in A minor, Op.82 - Eduardo Mata/London Symphony Orchestra (RCA Red Seal ARL1-2954) 1979
- Nielsen Violin Concerto (Grazioso Records 72601) 2001
- Lalo: Symphonie espagnole / Sibelius: Violin Concerto (Grazioso Records 61501) 2000
- Brahms: Complete Sonatas for Violin & Piano (Clarity Records 1014) 1996
- Brahms and Sibelius Concertos/Paganini Concertos 1 & 2 Kiev Philharmonic
- Love Fodor Style (Grazioso Records 95143) 2002
- Instrument of the Angels (Famous gospel pieces) (Grazioso Records 81904) 2000
