= Ning Feng =

Chinese violinist

- 宁峰
- Born: 1982 (age 43–44); Chengdu, China
- Occupation: Classical violinist

Ning Feng (宁峰, born 1982) is a Chinese violinist. He was born in Chengdu, China, and is based in Berlin.

== Career ==
Ning Feng began playing the violin as a child. Shortly after his fourth birthday, he began studying with Hu Weimin at the Sichuan Conservatory of Music. He later studied at the Royal Academy of Music in London under Hu Kun, the son of Hu Weimin. Ning became the first student at the academy to receive a mark of 100% for a final recital.

After that, he studied with Antje Weithaas in Berlin, at the Hanns Eisler School of Music. He went on to win prizes at the 2003 International Joseph Joachim Violin Competition in Hanover, Queen Elisabeth Competition, and Yehudi Menuhin International Competition for Young Violinists, and was First Prize winner of the 2005 Michael Hill International Violin Competition (New Zealand). In 2006 he was awarded first prize in the Paganini Competition.

In 2012, he founded the Dragon Quartet, in which he plays first violin, and he performs regularly with this ensemble, as well as with major local and international orchestras.

Ning Feng plays a 1710 Stradivarius violin, known as the "Vieuxtemps Hauser", on private loan, kindly arranged by Premiere Performances of Hong Kong and plays on strings by Thomastik-Infeld, Vienna.

He has performed as a soloist with many internationally known orchestras, including the Budapest Festival Orchestra, Hong Kong Philharmonic, Los Angeles Philharmonic, the Frankfurt Radio Symphony, the Royal Philharmonic, the City of Birmingham Symphony Orchestra, the China Philharmonic, the Royal Scottish National Orchestra, and others. He has worked with Iván Fischer, Jaap van Zweden, Mirga Gražinytė-Tyla, Yu Long, Vasily Petrenko, Yeruham Scharovsky, and many other conductors.

He is actively involved in education as well as performing. He holds the post of violin tutor at Hochschule für Musik "Hanns Eisler", Berlin, is guest professor at the Central Conservatory of Music, Beijing, and teaches at the Royal Northern College of Music in Manchester, UK.

== Recordings ==
Ning Feng records for Channel Classics Records, and has notably recorded Bach's Sonatas and Partitas for solo violin, in the first recording by a Chinese violinist, violin concertos by Bruch and Tchaikovsky, and two CDs of solo violin works by Bartók, Prokofiev, and Hindemith, and by Milstein, Berio, Paganini, and others.
