= Kevin Zhu (violinist) =

American concert violinist (born 2000)

- Born: November 27, 2000 (age 25); Maryland, U.S.A.
- Genre: Classical
- Instrument: Violin

Kevin Zhu (Chinese: 朱凯源, born on November 27, 2000) is an American concert violinist. He is a recipient of the 2021 Avery Fisher Career Grant and was the first prize winner of the 55th edition of the International Paganini Competition in Genoa, Italy, aged just 17. He was also the first prize winner in the junior division of the 2012 Yehudi Menuhin International Competition for Young Violinists in Beijing, China. In 2019, he made his debut at Carnegie Hall at Weill Recital Hall.

== Biography ==
Born in Maryland, USA, Kevin Zhu started playing violin at the age of 3. He attended elementary and middle schools in Cupertino, California. He was a pre-college student of Li Lin at the San Francisco Conservatory of Music. As a recipient of a Kovner Fellowship at The Juilliard School, Zhu studied with Itzhak Perlman and Li Lin, and graduated in 2022.

Following his success at the Menuhin and Paganini competitions, Zhu has been a featured soloist with orchestras such as the Philharmonia Orchestra, the Vienna Chamber Orchestra, the Moscow Virtuosi Orchestra, the Pittsburgh Symphony Orchestra, and the China Philharmonic Orchestra. He also performs solo recitals across the United States, Italy, Germany, England, Poland, China, and Lebanon. Zhu has repeatedly been featured on BBC Radio 3 and NPR's From the Top. In 2021–2022, Zhu performed perform on a multi-city tour of Italy including a project that involves to play all of Paganini's 24 caprices in one concert. In 2024, he was the fourth prize winner of the Queen Elisabeth Competition.

Zhu currently performs on the 1722 ‘Lord Wandsworth’ Stradivarius violin — on long-term loan to him from the Ryuji Ueno Foundation and the Rare Violins of New York "In Consortium".

== Awards and appearances ==
- Recipient of Kovner Fellowship, Juilliard School
- 2012: Junior Division First prize winner and Composer's prize winner at the Yehudi Menuhin International Competition for Young Violinists
- 2018: First prize winner, at the Paganini International Violin Competition.
- 2018: Special prizes winner for the "Best performance of a Paganini Caprice" and for "Being the Youngest Finalist", at the Paganini International Violin Competition.
- 2019: Carnegie Hall Debut at Weill Recital Hall
- 2021: Awarded a Lincoln Center for the Performing Arts Avery Fisher Career Grant
- 2021: Recipient of a Salon de Virtuosi Career Grant.
- 2024: Fourth prize winner, Queen Elisabeth Competition.
