= Bartłomiej Nizioł =

Polish violinist (born 1974)

Bartłomiej "Bartek" Nizioł (born 1 February 1974) is a Polish violinist playing in a bel canto style. His interpretations tend to be objective and comprehensive.

== Life ==
=== Education ===
Born in Szczecin, Nizioł started learning the violin at the age of five. "I have loved music since I was a child. I did what my big sister did: I played the violin, and it suited my inclinations and my talent. Out of this has grown a great love, together with a need to place my gifts at the service of music and of the public. This is something I have never questioned. Consequently, for me, making music has become as natural a process as walking. Without music there is nothing for me", says Niziol. His first teacher was Stanisław Ślusarek (at Państwowa Szkoła Muzyczna I stopnia im. Tadeusza Szeligowskiego in Szczecin, 1979–1984). We can read on the website of his first school: "Very active musically from the beginning of his study, we found him diligent and patient as a pupil of a difficult study of playing the violin". Following this Niziol received tuition in Stanisław Hajzer's class (at Zespół Szkół Muzycznych im. Feliksa Nowowiejskiego in Szczecin, 1984–1987).

Niziol entered the music school for gifted children in Poznań at the age of twelve to receive tuition in the class of Prof. Jadwiga Kaliszewska who told him that "a gift of music like Bartek's happens once a hundred years or even more rarely". Seven years later (in 1993), Niziol graduated with honour from the Academy of Music in Poznań to continue his study in Lausanne under Pierre Amoyal. Besides his regular studies, he took part in several master classes where he worked with such musicians as Zakhar Bron, Mauricio Fuks, Ruggiero Ricci and Michael Frischenschlager.

=== Competitions ===
Bartłomiej Niziol has won top prizes at many violin competitions:

1. Second Prize at the Yehudi Menuhin International Competition for Young Violinists in Folkestone (group: Juniors, 1987),
2. First Prize at the International Competition for Young Violinists in Honour of Karol Lipiński and Henryk Wieniawski in Lublin (group: Juniors, 1988),
3. Third Prize at the Yehudi Menuhin International Competition for Young Violinists in Folkestone (group: Seniors, 1989),
4. First Prize & Honourable Mention "summa cum laude" at the Polishwide Zdzisław Jahnke Competition for Violinists in Poznań (1989),
5. Second Prize at the Polishwide Tadeusz Wroński Solo Violin Competition in Warsaw (1990),
6. Fourth Prize at the Carl Flesch International Violin Competition in London (1990),
7. First Prize at the Adelaide International Competition (1991),
8. Third Prize at the Hanover International Violin Competition (1991),
9. First Prize at the Henryk Wieniawski Violin Competition in Poznań (1991 - ex equo with Piotr Pławner),
10. First Prize at the Pretoria International Competition (1991),
11. First Prize at the Eurovision Young Musicians in Brussels (1992),
12. First Prize at the Jacques Thibaud Competition in Paris (1993).

After winning at the J. Thibaud Competition, Niziol signed a special contract with the Alliance française to give over 100 concerts all over the world, including 11 countries in Asia and many countries in South America. He has performed in such cities as Tokyo, Mexico City, Caracas, São Paulo, Bogotá, Rio de Janeiro), and even in small towns in Africa.

Niziol, when being interviewed in 1995 for Studio (Polish magazine on classical music), was asked why he had taken part in so many competitions. He answered that "Probably only the latest Parisian competition actually gave me full satisfaction. That's why my activities so far have included such a great number of competitions". In reference to the Henryk Wieniawski Violin Competition in Poznań Niziol stated: "It was, of course, a great satisfaction [to win the competition], as the Henryk Wieniawski Violin Competition is regarded in our country [in Poland] as one of the most important artistic events. But, unfortunately, I must sincerely say that winning the First Prize in Poznań doesn't bring many profits. Naturally, I was noticed in the country [in Poland], I gained some prestige, but nothing matters as, actually, I had only a few subsequent concerts, and exclusively in the country (...)".

=== Career development ===
Niziol has performed as a soloist with many renowned orchestras: Tonhalle Orchester Zurich, Orchestre Philharmonique de Radio France, Orchestre de la Suisse Romande, English Chamber Orchestra, London Symphony Orchestra, North German Radio Symphony Orchestra, Southwest German Radio Symphony Orchestra, New Japan Philharmonic Orchestra, Edmonton Symphony Orchestra, Sinfonia Helvetica, Sinfonia Varsovia, in many famous concert halls: Barbican Centre in London (upon the invitation of Yehudi Menuhin), Salle Pleyel in Paris, Théâtre du Châtelet in Paris, Schauspielhaus in Berlin, Suntory Hall in Tokyo. He has collaborated with many famous conductors: Yehudi Menuhin, Jan Krenz, Marek Janowski, David Zinman, Heinrich Schiff, Grzegorz Nowak, Jacek Kaspszyk, Wojciech Michniewski, Andrey Boreyko, Yoav Talmi, Philippe Entremont.

Niziol has participated in music festivals, the most important being: MIDEM in Cannes (where his interpretation of Wieniawski’s Violin Concerto No. 2 (Wieniawski) received an enthusiastic reception), Festival de Radio France et Montpellier in Montpelier, “Zino Francescatti” Violin Festival, Festival de Carcassonne and “Musique et Amitié” in Switzerland. He has also appeared on Europalia Poland 2001 in Belgium, Warsaw Autumn in Poland and Musica Polonica Nova in Wrocław, Poland (2006).

=== Various musical activities ===
From 1997 to 2003, Niziol was concertmaster of the Tonhalle Orchester Zurich. As he himself stated in an interview for Polish Radio (broadcast on January 5, 2009), “many of the best violinists, such as Joseph Joachim or Eugène Ysaÿe, for example, were all concertmasters in various orchestras.” Niziol added that he does not agree with a new image of “only-virtuoso violinist who doesn't perform in ensembles.” Since 2003 Niziol has been concertmaster of the Zurich Opera.

Niziol is the founder of the Niziol Quartet. Their debut took place on the October 5, 2000 at the Tonhalle Zurich (sold out). On Niziol's official website we can read: "The Niziol Quartet performs with passion, virtuosity and a wide palette of tone colours and touches its audience through the depth of its playing. Its members are from Poland, United States, Switzerland and Russia. They came together as players in the Zurich Tonhalle Orchestra". The Niziol Quartet has recorded two albums, the second of them including String Quartets by Paul Juon (world premiere recording).

In 2007 the Stradivari Quartet was founded in Zürich where Niziol plays 1st violin. To find four Stradivarius instruments in one quartet is very rare. In fact, there are just two such quartets worldwide: the Tokyo String Quartet (founded in New York in 1969) and the Stradivari Quartet. In May 2008, the two quartets together performed the Octet in E-flat, Op. 20 by Felix Mendelssohn. The quartet has signed a contract with the prestigious mark of SONY. Their debut disc will include String Quartets, Op. 50 by Joseph Haydn and is due to appear in 2009.

Apart from the two quartets, Niziol gives regular recitals and sonata evenings in many prestigious venues, also appearing with different ensembles: he has performed with Pinchas Zukerman, Elisabeth Leonskaja, the Imperial Piano Trio & the Limming Ensemble. He has also formed a part-time trio with the Yofin Ensemble, including Konstantin Timokhine (natural horn) and Daniela Timokhine (piano, organ). Their recording of Esquisse by Georges Barboteu can be found on YouTube. Niziol has also collaborated with the renowned film music composer Vladimir Cosma (performing his “Concerto de Berlin”).

=== Repertoire ===
Niziol's repertoire includes a few dozen violin concertos, from J.S. Bach and Vivaldi to Penderecki, whose 2nd Violin Concerto was performed at the Warsaw Autumn with the Warsaw Philharmonic Orchestra under Jan Krenz.

=== Teaching activities ===
In October 2006 Niziol was a member of the jury of the 13th Henryk Wieniawski Violin Competition, the youngest juror in the history of this competition (he was 32 years old). As we can read on the site of the Henryk Wieniawski Musical Society of Poznań, "assisted by a group of domestic and international consultants, as well as the Board of the Wieniawski Society of Poznań, Konstanty Andrzej Kulka, one of the most illustrious Polish musical artists prepared the competition. With Wanda Wilkomirska and Bartlomiej Niziol, who represent two very different generations of the Competition’s laureates, and eight other international violin luminaries, he looked for young virtuosos most worthy of the Wieniawski 2006 laurel".

Since autumn 2008 Niziol has been teaching at the Musikhochschule in Bern (Switzerland). As he himself claims (in an interview with Polish Radio), his professional motto is: "I don't want to force anybody to play in the same way as I do, to imitate my playing. I try to show many different ways of playing - while teaching I always play - and it's the student who must choose."

Between 13 and 19 July 2009, Niziol served as lecturer and artistic director of the first MasterClass edition in Piła (in Poland) - the "masterly review of musical personalities", including the violin, the alto, the cello & the double bass. The other professors were Michel Willi (Switzerland), David Greenlees (Great Britain), Alexander Neustroev (Russia) & Dariusz Mizera (Poland). Each day of courses was concluded with a concert evening with pupils in the leading role. One of them was Agata Szymczewska, the winner of the First Prize at the Henryk Wieniawski Violin Competition in Poznań in 2006.

=== Instruments played ===
At the beginning of his career, Niziol played a contemporary violin. When recording his debut solo CD for DUX (Polish label), he played a Giovanni Paolo Maggini violin (1996). From 1997 to 2003 Niziol played the Stradivarius “Wieniawski” from 1719 (which belonged itself to the 19th century Polish virtuoso and composer Henryk Wieniawski). Since 2003 he has performed on the Guarneri del Gesù from 1727 and since 2007 he also has played the Stradivarius “Aurea” (which means "Golden") from 1715.

=== Present ===
Today Niziol plays as a soloist, as concertmaster of the Zurich opera house orchestra, and the first violinist of two quartets.

== Recordings ==
For his recordings, Niziol has received three Fryderyk awards: for the discs with Wieniawski (DUX, 1996), Bacewicz (DUX, 2005) & Ysaÿe (MVCD, 2010).

Niziol's interpretation of the Violin Concerto (Brahms) in D, Op. 77 by Brahms is considered, alongside that of David Oistrakh, as one of the most interesting in the history of recordings. In the Daily Telegraph we could read about this interpretation: "(...) There is something exhilarating about a musician who takes risks, within the stylistic orbit of the music he is playing. Niziol did that in the Brahms Concerto. It was a fascinating performance, full of colour and light and tonal variety, breadth and command, and he showed every sign of developing into a violinist of exceptional stature (...)".

=== From violin competitions ===
1. from Henryk Wieniawski Competition (in: "Prizewinners of Henryk Wieniawski International Violin Competitions 1935-2001") (including Wieniawski's Violin Concerto No. 2, parts II & III + Paganini's Capriccio in A minor, Op. 1 No. 5) (Henryk Wieniawski Musical Society of Poznań, 2005 - recordings from 1991)
2. from Henryk Wieniawski Competition (this disc is a supplement to a book on Henryk Wieniawski) (including Wieniawski's Thème original varié in A, Op. 15) (Henryk Wieniawski Musical Society of Poznań/Oficyna Wydawnicza ATENA, 2001 - recording from 1991)
3. from 6th Eurovision Competition for Young Musicians (including Brahms' Violin Concerto in D, Op. 77, part III) (Pavane/RTBF, ADW 7286, 1992)
4. from Jacques Thibaud Competition (including Chausson's Poème, Op. 25) (REM 311216, 1993)

=== DUX recordings ===
1. Wieniawski - Violin & Piano Works (DUX 0253, 1996)
2. Violin Concertos for Children, Vol. 2 (including pieces by Bériot, Viotti, Haydn & Mozart) (DUX 0169, 2000)
3. Mendelssohn - Concerto for Violin & Strings in D minor (DUX 0312, 2001)
4. Polish Violin Duos (including pieces by Górecki, Szymański, Ptaszyńska, Pstrokońska-Nawratil, Augustyn & Drożdżewski) (DUX 0398, 2002)
5. Brahms - Violin Concerto in D, Op. 77 & Double Concerto in A minor, Op. 102 (DUX 0404, 2003)
6. Mendelssohn - Concerto for Violin, Piano & Strings, Schubert - Rondo in A, D. 438 (DUX 0468, 2004)
7. Bacewicz - Violin & Piano Works (DUX/PWM 0486, 2004)

=== CD Accord recordings ===
1. Wieniawski - Violin Concerto No. 2 (CD Accord/Henryk Wieniawski Musical Society of Poznań, ACD 024, 1996)
2. Wieniawski - Pieces for Violin Solo, Two Violins and Violin with Piano (CD Accord/Henryk Wieniawski Musical Society of Poznań, ACD 106, 2001)

=== Miscellaneous commercial recordings ===
1. from "Musique et Amitié" Festival (including Vivaldi's Concerto for 4 Violins) (Sonoris, SCD 105, 1994)
2. from "Musique et Amitié" Festival (including Saint-Saëns’ Havanaise Op. 83) (Sonoris, SCD 108, 1996)
3. from "Musique et Amitié" Festival (including J.S. Bach's Concerto for Violin and Oboe, BWV 1060) (Sonoris, SCD 110, 1999)
4. Astriab - Violin Concerto (Academy of Music in Poznań, AM 0-01, 2000)
5. Cosma – Concerto de Berlin (in : "Vladimir Cosma dirige Orchestre national de Lyon") (Pomme, CB 831, 2005)
6. Rheinberger - Violin & Organ Works (Wiediscon, WD 9427, 2006)
7. Ysaÿe - 6 Sonatas for Solo Violin (Bartek Niziol & Magnus Ventus/Henryk Wieniawski Musical Society of Poznań, MVCD 001, 2009)

=== Bootlegs ===
1. The Yofin Ensemble & Bartek Niziol (including Szymanowski's Notturno und Tarantella, Op. 28 & Brahms' Horn Trio in E-flat, Op. 40) (recorded in Zürich ZHdK, 14.I.2008)

=== Radio recordings (unedited) ===
1. from Studio S1 (including Debussy's Violin Sonata, Wieniawski's Thème original varié in A, Op. 15, Szymanowski's Notturno und Tarantella, Op. 28 & Wieniawski's Violin Concerto No. 2 with Sinfonia Varsovia under Wojciech Michniewski) (recorded for Polish Radio)
2. from Radio Katowice (including Sarasate's “Carmen Fantasy”, Chausson's Poème, Op. 25 + Wieniawski's & Szymanowski's works)
3. Dvořák - Violin Concerto in A minor, Op. 53 (recorded for Polish Radio)
4. Brahms - The Double Concerto in A minor, Op. 102 (with Adam Klocek and Sinfonia Varsovia) (recorded for Polish Radio)
5. Elgar - Violin Concerto in B minor, Op. 61 (recorded with Edmonton Symphony Orchestra)
6. recordings with Southwest German Radio Symphony Orchestra under Grzegorz Nowak (including Wieniawski's Violin Concerto No. 2, Ysaÿe's Sonata for Solo Violin No. 3 & Sarasate's “Carmen Fantasy”) (14.XI.2003 & ??? - recorded for SWR.de Radio)

=== TV recordings (unedited) ===
1. from Radio Poznań (including Chausson's Poème, Op. 25 & ???)
2. from TV Poznań (including Ravel's Tzigane, Wieniawski's “Faust Fantasy”, Dinicu's Hora staccato & ???)
3. Penderecki - Violin Concerto No. 2 (from "Warsaw Autumn" festival)
4. Bottesini - Gran Duo Concertante for Violin and Double Bass (with Jacek Mirucki & Camerata Nova under Eugeniusz Kus)

=== Niziol Quartet recordings ===
1. Haydn & Borodin – String Quartets (Arte da Turicum, 2000)
2. Juon - String Quartets (Musiques Suisses, MGB CD 6242, 2006)

=== Stradivari-Quartett official recordings ===
1. Weihnachtsrosen (arrangements by Florian Walser) (StradivariQuartett, 2008)
2. Haydn – Complete String Quartets, Op. 50 (Sony, upcoming soon)

=== Stradivari-Quartett non-official recordings ===
1. Debut Stradivari-Quartett, Zürich 18.IX.2007 (StradivariQuartett)
2. Stradivari-Quartett - Debut-Tournee, Berlin 11.XI.2007 (StradivariQuartett)

=== Niziol as concertmaster playing solos ===
1. R. Strauss - Le Bourgeois gentilhomme (with Orchestre de la Suisse Romande under Marek Janowski) (recorded for Radio France, unedited)
2. Stravinsky - Pulcinella (with Tonhalle-Orchester Zürich under Christopher Hogwood) (recorded for Schweizer Radio DRS 2, unedited)
3. R. Strauss - Der Rosenkavalier (with Orchester der Oper Zürich under Franz Welser-Möst) (EMI Classics, DVD, 0724354425899, 2005)
