= Hudeček =

Hudeček (feminine Hudečková) is a Czech surname. Notable people with the surname include:

- Antonín Hudeček (1872–1941), Czech painter
- Carl Hudecek (born 1934), American engineer
- Eva Hudečková, Czech actress
- Jiří Hudeček, Czech cyclist
- Milan Hudecek (born 1954), Australian inventor
- Petr Hudeček, Czech weightlifter
- Tomáš Hudeček (born 1979), Czech politician
- Václav Hudeček (born 1952), Czech violinist
