= Frédéric Chaslin =

French conductor, composer, pianist and author

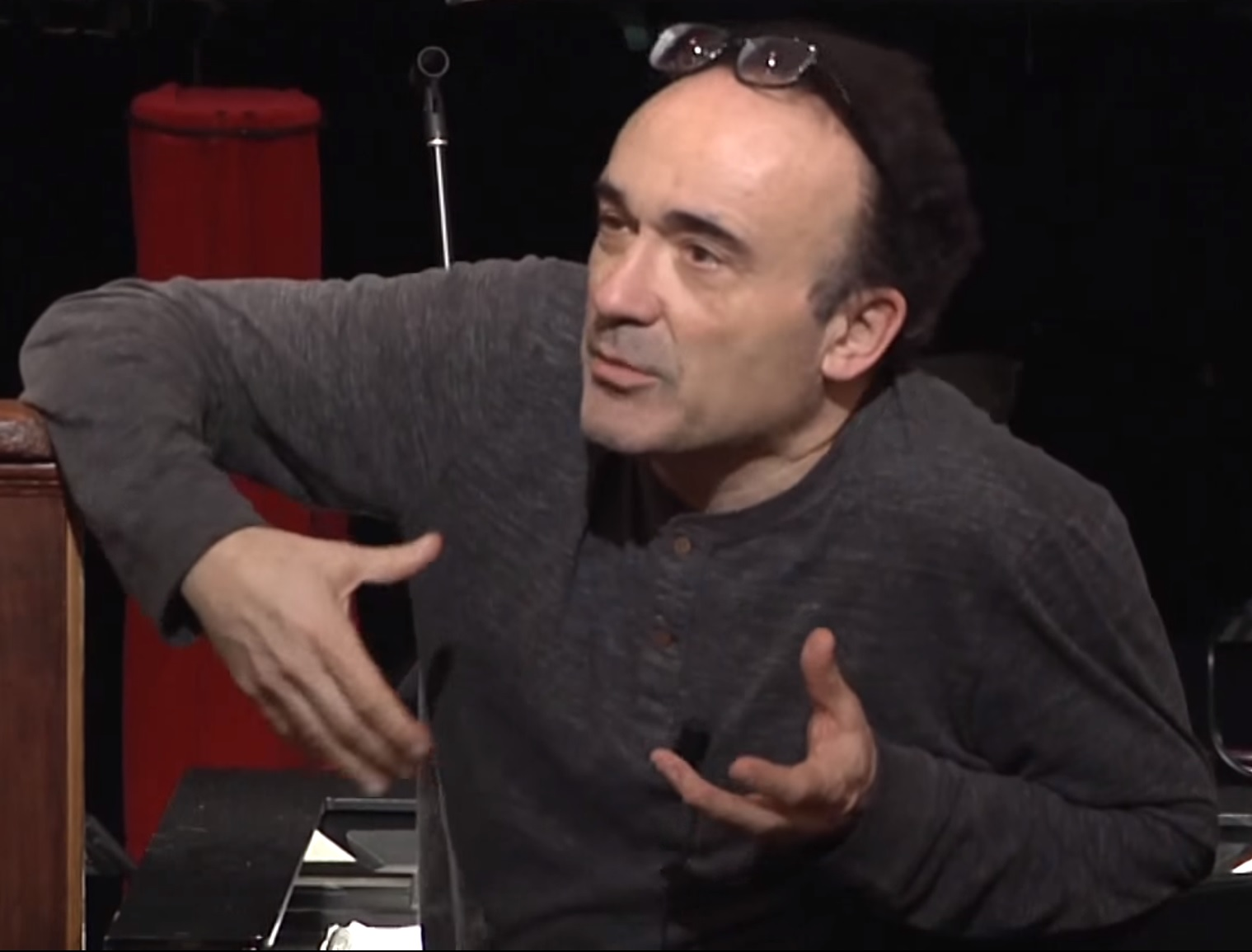
Chaslin discussing Carmen at the Teatro Comunale di Bologna in 2016

Frédéric Chaslin (French: [ʃas.lɛ̃]; born 1963 in Paris) is a French conductor, composer, pianist and author. He has served as music director of the Rouen Opera (1991–1993), the Jerusalem Symphony Orchestra (1999–2002 and 2012–2019), the Nationaltheater Mannheim (2004–2006), and chief conductor of the Santa Fe Opera (2010–2012). He founded the music production company Unistage in 2024.

== Early life and education ==
Chaslin was born in Paris in 1963. On his mother's side, he descends from the Micheletti family of Genoese origin, whose surname became Michelet following the annexation of Savoy to France. He began performing as an organist at an early age and gave a concert at Notre-Dame de Paris at the age of ten. He entered the Conservatoire de Paris at twelve and studied harmony, counterpoint, piano accompaniment, vocal coaching, conducting, fugue, piano and chamber music.

He continued his studies at the Mozarteum University Salzburg, studying Lied accompaniment with Paul von Schilhawsky and conducting with Milan Horvat and Leopold Hager.

From 1987 to 1989 he assisted Daniel Barenboim at the Orchestre de Paris and worked with him at the Bayreuth Festival in 1988 on Richard Wagner's Der Ring des Nibelungen, directed by Harry Kupfer.

From 1989 to 1991 he was an assistant to Pierre Boulez at the Ensemble intercontemporain. He stood in for Boulez at a concert at Palazzo Farnese in Rome and, in 1991, at the Wien Modern festival founded by Claudio Abbado, when Boulez was unable to appear because of illness.

== Conducting career ==
Chaslin has held music directorships at the Rouen Opera (1991–1993), the Jerusalem Symphony Orchestra (1999–2002 and 2012–2019), the Nationaltheater Mannheim (2004–2006) and the Santa Fe Opera (2010–2012). His international opera career expanded with Nabucco at the Bregenz Festival in 1993 and 1994 and Fidelio in 1995 and 1996. He subsequently became a regular conductor at the Vienna State Opera, where its performance archive records his operatic and concert appearances, including the theatre’s 150th-anniversary celebrations in 2019.

=== United Kingdom ===
In the United Kingdom, Chaslin has worked with the London Symphony Orchestra, the Philharmonia Orchestra, the Hallé, Opera North, Scottish Opera and the Royal Scottish National Orchestra.

Between 2009 and 2013 he conducted productions of Carmen and Madama Butterfly at Welsh National Opera in Cardiff, as well as orchestral concerts.

With the BBC National Orchestra of Wales and violinist Nicolas Dautricourt, he recorded an album devoted to Edward Elgar and Frederick Delius, released by Channel Classics Records in 2025. Chaslin also contributed a Delius arrangement and performed as pianist.

=== United States and Latin America ===
Chaslin made his debut at the Metropolitan Opera in New York in November 2002, conducting Il trovatore. His repertory there has included I vespri siciliani, The Tales of Hoffmann, The Barber of Seville and La bohème.

His Metropolitan Opera debut was also reviewed by The New York Times.

At Los Angeles Opera he conducted Charles Gounod's Roméo et Juliette with Anna Netrebko and Rolando Villazón in the title roles.

At Santa Fe Opera he conducted La traviata with Natalie Dessay, Faust, Tosca and Maometto II.

In May 2010, Santa Fe Opera appointed him its second chief conductor, effective 1 October 2010; he left the post in August 2012.

In 2019, his opera Monte-Cristo, commissioned by Plácido Domingo, was premiered by young artists of Los Angeles Opera's training programme. Another opera, Clarimonde, based on a text by Théophile Gautier, was premiered at the Phoenicia Festival in New York State and subsequently performed at the Public Theater in Cleveland.

In Latin America he conducted Mozart's The Magic Flute at the Teatro Colón in Buenos Aires and at the Municipal Theatre of Santiago in Chile.

=== Israel ===
Chaslin began working with Israeli orchestras and opera institutions in Jerusalem, Tel Aviv and Haifa in the 1990s. In 1993, he conducted Pierre Boulez's Le Marteau sans maître in Jerusalem with the Ensemble du XXIe siècle, and in 1995 Arnold Schoenberg's Chamber Symphony. He conducted Offenbach's The Tales of Hoffmann in 1997, Verdi's La traviata in 1998 in a production directed by Christopher Alden, and Mozart's Così fan tutte in 1999 in a production directed by Jonathan Miller.

He served two terms as music director of the Jerusalem Symphony Orchestra, from 1999 to 2002 and from 2012 to 2019. His activities included symphonic and vocal repertoire and international tours, including a programme pairing Stravinsky's Oedipus rex and Bartók's Bluebeard's Castle, also performed in Bucharest.

He also worked with the Israel Philharmonic Orchestra, particularly between 2002 and 2006, in programmes including works by Israeli composers Noam Sheriff and other Israeli composers. He returned to the orchestra in 2014 in connection with the Arthur Rubinstein International Piano Master Competition. Other collaborations included the Israel Chamber Orchestra, the Haifa Symphony Orchestra and the Rishon LeZion Symphony Orchestra.

In 2013, he participated in musical events commemorating the rescue of Danish Jews in 1943. In 2015, he conducted a concert at UNESCO headquarters in Paris in connection with his artistic collaborations involving Israel.

=== Germany ===
In 2000 he conducted Bellini's I puritani at the Deutsche Oper Berlin, in the final production directed by Götz Friedrich, followed by further performances at the theatre.

He conducted Offenbach's The Tales of Hoffmann at Oper Leipzig and the Semperoper in Dresden, Donizetti's Lucia di Lammermoor and Puccini's La bohème at the Hamburg State Opera, and productions including Madama Butterfly, Tosca and Verdi operas at the Bavarian State Opera in Munich.

His 2016 Dresden production of The Tales of Hoffmann was reviewed in the German music press.

=== Italy ===
Chaslin made his Italian debut in 1994 at La Fenice in Venice with Offenbach's The Tales of Hoffmann. In 1995 he conducted Bellini's La sonnambula in Padua as part of La Fenice's activities, and returned to the Venetian theatre in 2005 for Halévy's La Juive.

A La Fenice concert featuring Berlioz's Symphonie fantastique and Ravel's Boléro was scheduled for December 2020 but suspended. In April 2022 he conducted Gounod's Faust; that year he also led symphonic concerts featuring Bernstein's Serenade, Tchaikovsky's Sixth Symphony with violinist Francesca Dego, and works by Berlioz and Ravel. In February 2023 he conducted Mozart and Fauré's Requiem; in November 2023 he conducted The Tales of Hoffmann, directed by Damiano Michieletto. In June 2025 he conducted Poulenc's Dialogues des Carmélites in a production by Emma Dante.

At La Fenice he also recorded Poulenc's La voix humaine with soprano Julie Cherrier-Hoffmann, released by Aparté.

At the Teatro Lirico Giuseppe Verdi in Trieste he conducted Bizet's The Pearl Fishers in March 2008 and returned in November 2022 for a symphonic concert with cellist Ettore Pagano. In February 1998 he conducted seven performances of Donizetti's La favorite at the Teatro dell'Opera di Roma. In Turin he worked with the RAI National Symphony Orchestra, conducting Debussy and Richard Strauss at the Auditorium Giovanni Agnelli in 1999, and also collaborated with the Teatro Regio.

On 3 October 2010 he conducted the Filarmonica della Scala at La Scala as part of the 19th Milano Musica Festival, with violist Gérard Caussé and works by Fartein Valen, Hugues Dufourt and Jean Sibelius. He returned to La Scala for Ponchielli's La Gioconda in June 2022 and Offenbach's The Tales of Hoffmann in March 2023.

At the Teatro Comunale di Bologna he conducted Carmen in 2016, Verdi's Aida in 2017, and Mascagni's Cavalleria rusticana and Leoncavallo's Pagliacci in December 2019, as well as symphonic concerts.

In Sicily, he has conducted at the Teatro Massimo Bellini in Catania and the Teatro Massimo in Palermo, including a run of Gounod's Faust in March 2025.

On 29 April 2025 he returned to Palermo for a symphonic programme including Richard Strauss's Ein Heldenleben.

On 8 February 2026 he appeared at the Teatro Massimo as both conductor and pianist, performing Beethoven's Triple Concerto with violinist Salvatore Greco and cellist Kristi Curb, as well as Beethoven's Choral Fantasy.

The second part of the concert featured Julie Cherrier-Hoffmann in Poulenc's Fiançailles pour rire and Les chemins de l'amour, orchestrated by Chaslin, and concluded with Poulenc's Stabat Mater, sung by Giulia Semenzato with the theatre's chorus and orchestra.

=== Switzerland ===
In Switzerland he conducted Verdi's Ernani at the Zürich Opera House in 2000 and Ambroise Thomas's Mignon at the Grand Théâtre de Genève in 2012, with Diana Damrau and Sophie Koch.

He also appeared as pianist with Angela Gheorghiu at Geneva's Victoria Hall and conducted the Orchestre de la Suisse Romande in a concert performance of Ernest Reyer's Sigurd.

=== Scandinavia ===
In Denmark he conducted Offenbach's The Tales of Hoffmann in 2017.

He worked with the orchestra of the Norwegian National Opera and Ballet in Oslo. In 2008 he conducted a gala concert in connection with the opening season of the new opera house, including the overture to his own opera Wuthering Heights.

At the Savonlinna Opera Festival in Finland he conducted Carmen in 2014 and Rossini's The Barber of Seville in 2019.

=== France ===
In France he has conducted the Orchestre de Paris, Orchestre National de France, Orchestre Philharmonique de Radio France and the orchestra of the Paris Opera.

He has also worked with orchestras in Lille, Bordeaux, Strasbourg, Montpellier, Nice and Marseille.

Among his operatic engagements in France was Mozart's Don Giovanni at the Chorégies d'Orange festival.

=== Spain ===
In Spain, he has conducted at the Gran Teatre del Liceu in Barcelona, the Peralada Festival and the Santander International Festival.

Between 2008 and 2009 he recorded his opera Wuthering Heights in Valencia.

In 2002 he conducted Verdi's Falstaff at the Teatro Real in Madrid. He has also conducted the Spanish National Orchestra.

=== Portugal ===
Frédéric Chaslin has conducted and performed as a pianist in Portugal, notably at the Teatro Nacional de São Carlos in Lisbon, with the Orquestra Sinfónica Portuguesa and the Gulbenkian Orchestra of the Calouste Gulbenkian Foundation.

At the Teatro Nacional de São Carlos, he conducted Hector Berlioz's Les Troyens in four performances between 24 May and 5 June 1997, in a production staged by Paulo Ferreira de Castro, featuring Chris Merritt, Deborah Voigt and Didier Henry. On 21 July 1998, he conducted Les Troyens à Carthage, the second part of Berlioz's opera, at the same theatre, with the Orquestra Sinfónica Portuguesa and a cast including Markella Hatziano, Jon Kettleson and Liliana Bizineche. The performance was reviewed in the Spanish classical music magazine Scherzo in October 1998.

Chaslin has also worked regularly with the Gulbenkian Orchestra. On 5 and 6 February 2015, he conducted a programme featuring Jean Sibelius's Violin Concerto, with violinist Frank Peter Zimmermann as soloist, and Pyotr Ilyich Tchaikovsky's Symphony No. 6.

On 21 April 2016, he conducted the Gulbenkian Orchestra at the foundation's Grand Auditorium in a concert with soprano Patricia Petibon. The programme included works by Maurice Ravel, Enrique Granados, Joaquín Turina, Manuel de Falla, Jules Massenet, Emmanuel Chabrier and Leonard Bernstein.

Three days later, on 24 April 2016, during the Dias da Música festival at the Belém Cultural Center, he conducted the Gulbenkian Orchestra in a programme of Scandinavian music featuring works by Carl Nielsen, Edvard Grieg and Sibelius. That evening, he performed both of Ravel's piano concertos, the Piano Concerto in G major and the Piano Concerto for the Left Hand, acting simultaneously as pianist and conductor. The evening performance was broadcast live by the Portuguese public radio station Antena 2.

On 27 April 2018, Chaslin conducted Berlioz's La damnation de Faust at the Belém Cultural Center, with the Orquestra Sinfónica Portuguesa, the chorus of the Teatro Nacional de São Carlos, and soloists Béatrice Uria-Monzon, Aquiles Machado, Philippe Rouillon and Arnaud Rouillon.

On 2 and 3 February 2023, he conducted Gustav Mahler's Symphony No. 3 at the Grand Auditorium of the Calouste Gulbenkian Foundation, with the Gulbenkian Orchestra and Choir, the Children's and Youth Choir of the Gregorian Institute of Lisbon, and contralto Wiebke Lehmkuhl. He replaced Pablo Heras-Casado, who had originally been scheduled to conduct.

On 4 and 5 January 2024, Chaslin returned to the Gulbenkian Orchestra for its New Year's concerts with tenor Jonathan Tetelman. The programme featured waltzes and polkas by Johann Strauss II, alongside operatic excerpts by Giuseppe Verdi and Giacomo Puccini. In a review published on 8 January 2024 in ClassiqueNews, critic Emmanuel Andrieu discussed Chaslin's conducting and the orchestra's performance.

=== Oman ===
During a Vienna State Opera tour to Oman, he conducted Massenet's Werther at the Royal Opera House Muscat in April 2016.

=== Romania ===
Chaslin has maintained a long association with Romanian musical institutions, including the George Enescu Festival, the Romanian National Opera, Bucharest, the Romanian Radio National Orchestra and the George Enescu Philharmonic.

At the George Enescu Festival in 1995 he conducted Debussy's Pelléas et Mélisande with the Iași Philharmonic Orchestra. He returned in 1998 with the Jerusalem Symphony Orchestra for a programme including Stravinsky's Oedipus rex and Bartók's Bluebeard's Castle at the Radio Hall in Bucharest.

In 2018 he conducted the Romanian Radio National Orchestra at the RadiRo festival in music by Tchaikovsky, Schumann and Rimsky-Korsakov. In March 2020 he returned to the Radio Hall for Bernstein's The Age of Anxiety with pianist Dana Ciocârlie.

At the George Enescu Festival in September 2021 he conducted a concert performance of Korngold's Die tote Stadt with the George Enescu Philharmonic Orchestra and Chorus. He also conducted Mozart's The Marriage of Figaro, Verdi's Aida and Gounod's Faust at the Romanian National Opera in Bucharest later that year.

In March 2024 he conducted Grieg's Piano Concerto with Saleem Abboud Ashkar and Mahler's First Symphony. In November 2024 he returned to the Radio Hall with violinist Maria Marica in French music by Ravel, Chausson, Saint-Saëns and Franck.

=== Japan ===
In Japan, Chaslin conducted four opera productions at the New National Theatre Tokyo: Puccini's Tosca in 2009, Giordano's Andrea Chénier, Offenbach's The Tales of Hoffmann, and Donizetti's L'elisir d'amore.

He later returned to Tokyo for a concert performance of Tosca at the Tokyo Spring Festival in April 2023, with Bryn Terfel as Scarpia.

In 2026, Chaslin's name appeared in documents related to Jeffrey Epstein. In March, Ouest-France reported that, according to a statement from his American lawyer, no inappropriate conduct or legal proceedings against him had been identified in the United States. In August 2026, the Paris public prosecutor's office closed proceedings concerning Chaslin.

== Pianist ==
Chaslin studied piano at the Conservatoire de Paris with Aldo Ciccolini, with whom he later developed a friendship and artistic collaboration.

Alongside his conducting career, he performs as a pianist, often combining the roles of soloist and conductor. His repertoire includes Ravel's two piano concertos and Beethoven's concertos.

In October 2001 he performed Beethoven's Piano Concerto No. 5, Op. 73, with the Vienna Philharmonic at the Vienna State Opera in the ballet Beethoven Opus 73, in three performances between 2 and 24 October. On 19 January 2009 he played and conducted the same concerto with the Orchestra della Toscana at the Teatro Verdi in Pisa.

His performances of Ravel's Piano Concerto in G major as pianist and conductor include appearances in Trieste and Nagoya, Japan.

On 2 August 2024 he performed Ravel's Piano Concerto in G major and Gershwin's Rhapsody in Blue as pianist and conductor at an open-air memorial concert in Piazza Maggiore, Bologna, broadcast on Rai 5 and Rai Radio 3.

His piano work also includes chamber music and vocal accompaniment, including recordings with flautist Karl-Heinz Schütz and soprano Julie Cherrier-Hoffmann.

In 2023 he recorded the album Syrinx with Schütz for Evidence Classics, performing music by Debussy, Poulenc, Honegger, Varèse and Bozza, as well as Chaslin's own sonata for flute and piano.

== Composer ==
In 2019 Chaslin signed a publishing agreement with Universal Edition in Vienna for a catalogue comprising operas, symphonic works, chamber music, piano music and songs for voice and piano or orchestra.

His stage works include Wuthering Heights, based on Emily Brontë's novel; Le Bel Indifférent, after Jean Cocteau; Monte-Cristo, for which he wrote the libretto after Alexandre Dumas; and Le Petit Prince, with his own libretto after Antoine de Saint-Exupéry.

Le Petit Prince was conceived as a musical comedy. Chaslin recorded it with Lambert Wilson as the aviator, ahead of a proposed Paris stage production. Excerpts have been published on SoundCloud.

He has composed numerous song cycles, some of which have been recorded by international singers.

He also composed song cycles on poems by Robert Frost, performed by the Jerusalem Symphony Orchestra between 2012 and 2015.

His chamber music includes a flute sonata dedicated to Karl-Heinz Schütz, recorded with the composer at the piano for the album Syrinx in 2023.

His orchestral Theme and 11 Variations for Trombone and Orchestra is based on the trombone solo in the first movement of Mahler's Third Symphony and is dedicated to Enzo Turriziani of the Vienna Philharmonic.

== Author ==
Chaslin published La Musique dans tous les sens in 2009 with France-Empire and the novel Being Gustav Mahler with Fayard in 2017. English translations by David Baker were released under the titles Music in Every Sense and Being Gustav Mahler.

== Personal life ==
Chaslin is the son of an architect and has two sons. He married French soprano Julie Cherrier-Hoffmann in 2018; they have recorded several albums together.

== Discography ==
- Verdi, Ludovic Tézier, Frédéric Chaslin, Orchestra del Teatro Comunale di Bologna, Sony Classical – 19439753632
- Boulevard Des Italiens Benjamin Bernheim, Orchestra Del Teatro Comunale Di Bologna, Frédéric Chaslin – Deutsche Grammophon 4861964
- Desire, Aleksandra Kurzak, Morphing Chamber Orchestra of Vienna, Frédéric Chaslin, Sony Classical
- Paris, Mon Amour, Sonya Yoncheva, Orquestra De La Communitat Valenciana, Frédéric Chaslin – Sony Classical 88875017202
- Rachel, Rachel Willis-Sørensen, Orchestra del Opera di Genova, Frédéric Chaslin – Sony Classical
- Nuit Resplendissante Vesselina Kasarova, Münchner Rundfunkorchester, Frédéric Chaslin - RCA VICTOR GROUP – 74321 67667 2
- Damrau Forever, Vocalise by Frédéric Chaslin, Diana Damrau, Liverpool Symphony, Decca
- Backstage, Kevin Amiel, Orchestra Fondazione Rossini, Frédéric Chaslin, Aparte-Little Tribeca
- Je te veux, Julie Cherrier-Hoffmann, Frédéric Chaslin (piano), Aparte-Little Tribeca
- La Voix Humaine, Julie Cherrier-Hoffmann, Orchestra del Teatro La Fenice, Frédéric Chaslin, Aparte-Little Tribeca
- Rendez-vous, Julie Cherrier-Hoffmann, Lucienne Renaudin-Vary, Pierre Arditi, Frédéric Chaslin, Aparte-Little Tribeca
- Chansons pour Elle, Julie Cherrier-Hoffmann, Frédéric Chaslin (piano), Aparte-Little Tribeca
- Syrinx, Karl-Heinz Schütz, Frédéric Chaslin (piano & composition), Evidence EVCD097
- Elgar , Delius, Nicolas Dautricourt – Violin Concerto, Salut D'Amour / Suite, BBC orchestra, Frédéric Chaslin, Channel Classics – CCS 48725
- Shicoff: Arien, Neil Shicoff, Munich Radio Orchestra, Frédéric Chaslin, Orfeo, C561031A
- Cellopera, Ophélie Gaillard, Morphing Chamber Orchestra of Vienna, Frédéric Chaslin, Aparte-Little Tribeca
- Cornelia Ptassek, Arias, Orchestra of the Nationaltheater Mannheim, Frédéric Chaslin (composer/conductor), GENUIN
- Le 5ème Element, Luc Besson, soundtrack featuring Inva Mula and the London Symphony Orchestra; Chaslin credited as conductor
- Jocaste, opera by Charles Chaynes, Rouen Opera Theater Orchestra, 1995

Preceded by Ádám Fischer	Generalmusikdirektor, Nationaltheater Mannheim; 2005–2006	Succeeded by Axel Kober
Preceded by Edo de Waart	Chief Conductor, Santa Fe Opera; 2010–2012	Succeeded by Post vacant
Preceded by Leon Botstein	Music Director, Jerusalem Symphony Orchestra; 2012–2019	Succeeded by Steven Sloane
