= Julia Sakharova =

Russian violinist

Julia Sakharova (also Yulia; Russian: Юлия Сахарова) is a Moldovan-born Russian professional violinist. A native of Zheleznovodsk, Russia, she debuted at the age of eight with the Moldova Symphony Orchestra. Her mother is also a musician. By the age of 11, she was already internationally known as a child prodigy due to her skills on the violin. At the age of 15, she won the top prize in the International Competition for Music of Eastern and Central Europe; Vladimir Spivakov, the head of the jury, presented her with his bow in addition to the prize. She attended Oberlin College, graduating in 2003 with a major in violin performance; she studied under Milan Vitek while there. That same year, she competed in the Concours International de Montréal des Jeunesses Musicales, and won sixth prize. In 2005, she visited Caracas, Venezuela to perform with the National Philharmonic Orchestra there. She was Assistant Concertmaster of the Alabama Symphony Orchestra from 2008 to 2012. In 2012, Sakharova joined the Arianna String Quartet which is on Residence at the University of Missouri St. Louis. She is part of the Music Faculty as Associate Professor of Violin. In 2024, Sakharova was appointed Concertmaster with Orchestra Iowa. In 2026 Julia Sakharova became the Assistant Professor of Violin at the University of Northern Iowa

Sakharova uses a violin that was made by Rafaelle and Antonio Gagliano in Naples in 1819.

== Education ==
Graduated from Moscow's Central Special Music School. Graduated from Oberlin College in 2003, studying with Taras Gabora, Almita Vamos and Milan Vitek. Received a master's degree from the Juilliard School in 2006, studying with Donald Weilerstein.

== Discography ==
- 2001 — Rachmaninoff: The Élégiaque Piano Trios (Tavros Records) — with cellist Margrét Arnadóttir and pianist Yung Wook Yoo
- 2015 — Beethoven: The Early String Quartets, Opus 18 (Centaur Records) — as part of the Arianna String Quartet
- 2017 — Beethoven: The Middle Quartets (Centaur Records) — as part of the Arianna String Quartet
- 2023 — Beethoven: The Late Quartets (Centaur Records) — as part of the Arianna String Quartet
