= Josef Špaček (violinist) =

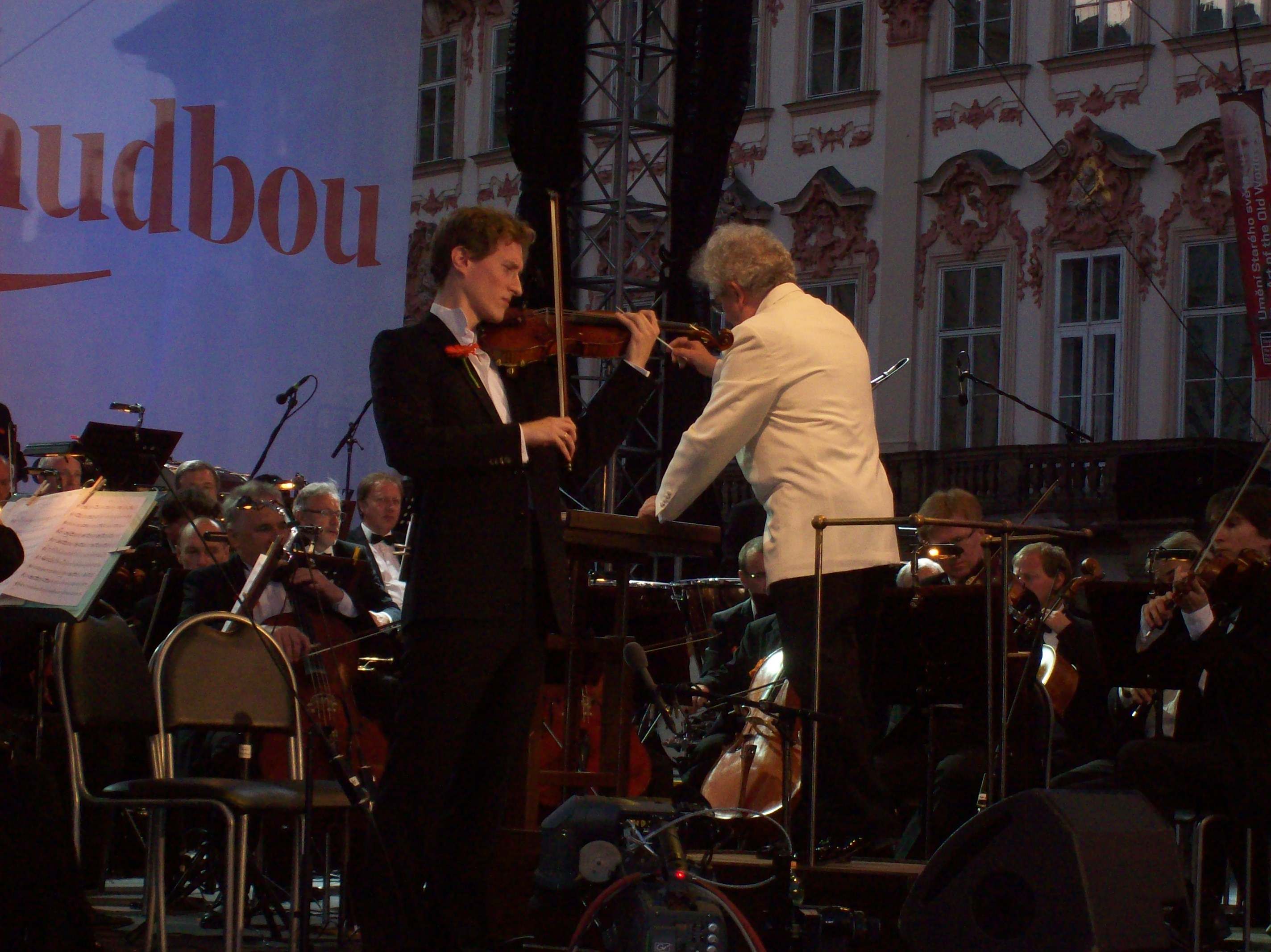

Background information
- Born: 17 October 1986 (age 38); Třebíč, Czechoslovakia
- Genres: Classical
- Occupation(s): violinist, concert master
- Instrument: Violin
- Years active: since 1992

Josef Špaček (born 17 October 1986) is a Czech solo violinist and until 2019/20 season a concertmaster of the Czech Philharmonic orchestra. He performs on the c. 1732 “LeBrun; Bouthillard” Guarneri del Gesù violin, generously on loan from Ingles & Hayday.

== Early life and education ==
Špaček was born in 1986 in Třebíč, Czechoslovakia, to a family with musical tradition. His father, Josef Špaček Sr., is a prominent cellist with the Czech Philharmonic and his siblings have also studied music. Špaček started playing violin at the age of three and three years later started taking violin lessons in US and Czech schools including the Curtis Institute of Music, the Juilliard School, and the Prague Conservatory. Among his teachers have been Itzhak Perlman, Václav Hudeček, Ida Kavafian, Jaime Laredo, and Shmuel Ashkenasi.

== Professional career ==
Špaček finished his master's degree at the Juilliard School in 2011 and had received an offer to serve as the concert master of the Czech Philharmonic already in late 2010. He took up the job in 2011 and worked both in the orchestra and as a solo violinist. In 2020 he left his concertmaster position in order to focus exclusively on his solo career. In 2012, he was one of the finalists at the Queen Elisabeth Music Competition and is a laureate of the Michael Hill International Violin Competition (New Zealand, 2009), Carl Nielsen International Music Competition (Denmark, 2008) and others.

== Concerts and recordings ==
He has performed and recorded with prominent conductors and pianists. His debut recording of Eugène Ysaÿe's sonatas came out in 2006. In 2010, he recorded Heinrich Wilhelm Ernst's work with Naxos and in 2013, his first Supraphon label recording was made with works of Sergei Prokofiev, Bedřich Smetana and Leoš Janáček. In 2015 Supraphon released his recording of violin concertos by Antonín Dvořák, Leoš Janáček and the Fantasy by Josef Suk, with the Czech Philharmonic Orchestra and conductor Jiří Bělohlávek.
