= Airi Suzuki (violinist) =

Japanese violinist

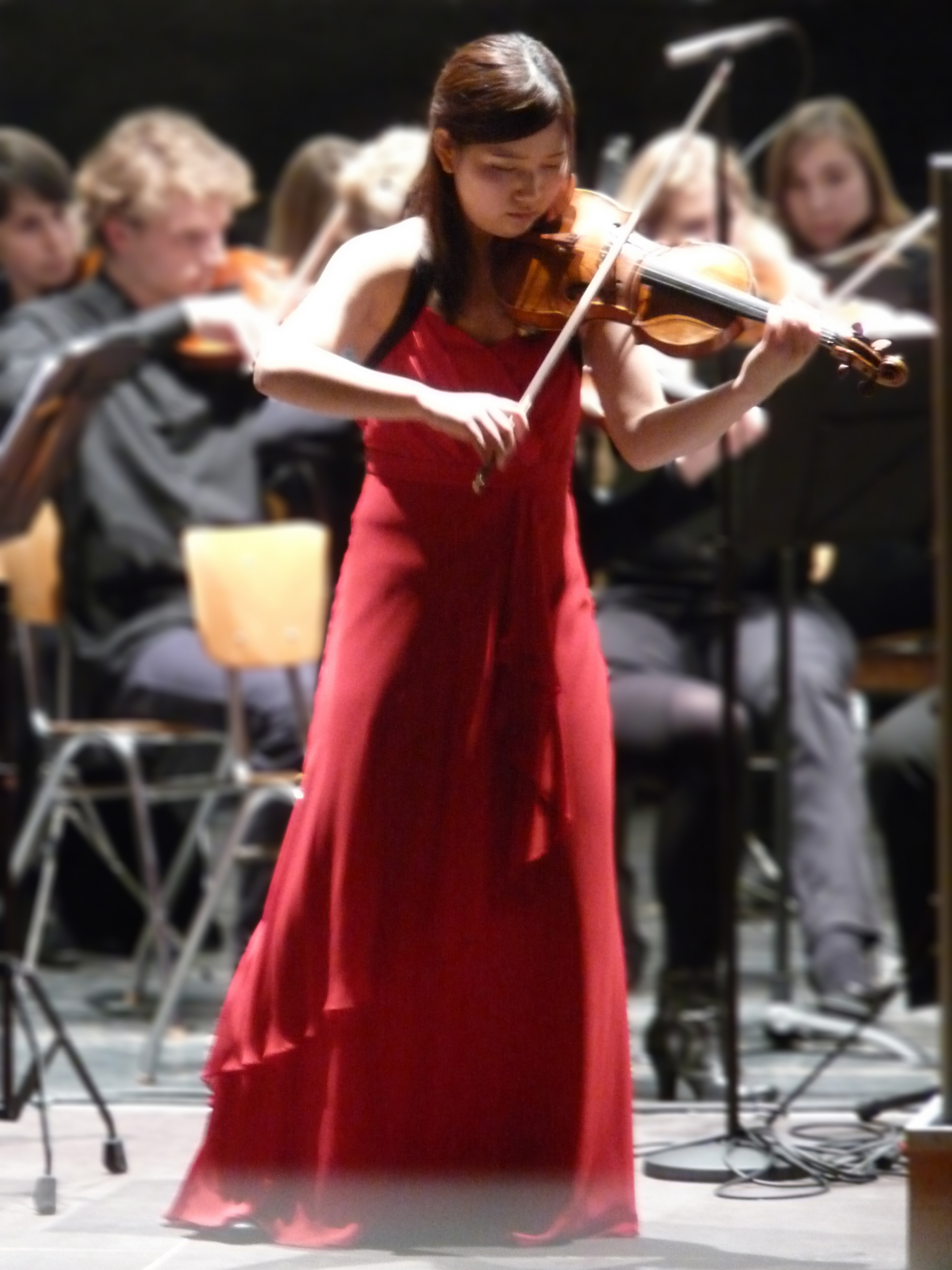
- Airi Suzuki (2013)
- Born: November 9, 1989; Japan Tokyo
- Other name: 鈴木 愛理
- Occupation: Violinist

Airi Suzuki (鈴木 愛理, Suzuki Airi; born 1989 in Tokyo, Japan) is a Japanese violinist.

== Biography ==
She began playing the violin at the age of four and joined the Toho Gakuen School of Music in 2005. In 2006, she was second prize winner at the XIII Henryk Wieniawski Violin Competition. Suzuki performed her debut recital at Yokosuka in the spring of 2005, and is studying at the Hanover University of Music, Drama and Media with Krzysztof Wegrzyn. In the past, she performed with the Tokyo Symphony Orchestra, New Japan Philharmonic Orchestra, Sendai Philharmonic Orchestra, and Poznan Philharmonic Orchestra. She won fifth prize at the Joseph Joachim International Violin Competition Hannover in 2012.

== Competitions and awards ==
- 10th Violin competition for children: Gold Prize in 1998
- 10th Japan Classic Music Competition: 2nd Prize (no 1st Prize) in 2000
- 57th All Japan Student Music Competition: 1st Prize in 2003
- 13th Henryk Wieniawski Violin Competition: 2nd Prize in 2006
- 8th Joseph Joachim International Violin Competition Hannover: 5th Prize in 2012
