= Henryk Wieniawski Violin Competition =

Polish violin competition

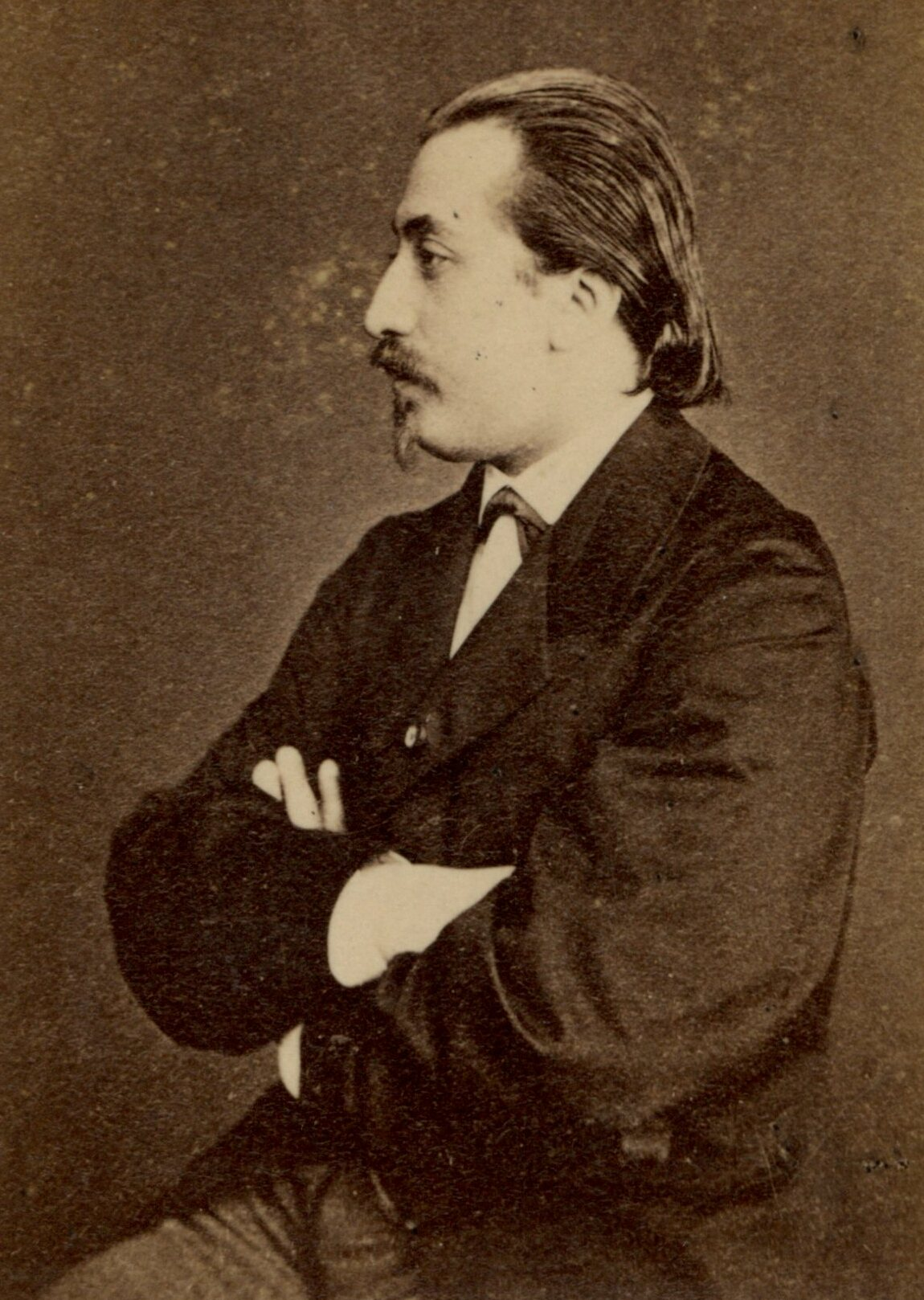
Portrait of Henryk Wieniawski, 1865

The International Henryk Wieniawski Violin Competition (Polish: Międzynarodowy Konkurs Skrzypcowy im. Henryka Wieniawskiego) is a competition for violinists up to age 30 that takes place every five years in Poznań, Poland, in honor of the virtuoso and composer Henryk Wieniawski (1835–1880). The first competition took place in 1935 in Warsaw, 100 years after the birth of its patron, and consisted of two stages. The second, after a gap of 17 years in 1952, and subsequent events were held in Poznań in three stages. In 1957 the competition became one of the founding members of the World Federation of International Music Competitions in Geneva. In 2001 it was decided that the competition would henceforth be held in four stages.

Candidates shall be qualified for the competition subject to preliminary selection auditions run by Maxim Vengerov and another member of the jury.

The following three statutory prizes shall be awarded in the competition: First prize: 30,000 Euro and gold medal; Second prize: 20,000 Euro and silver medal; and Third prize: 12,000 Euro and bronze medal.

Additional prizes include three honorary distinctions of 5,000 Euro and the special extra-statutory prize funded by Maxim Vengerov: 12 individual lessons for one of the competition participants. The first edition of the competition took place in 1935 in Warsaw and drew 160 contestants from 23 countries. The inaugural winner of the competition was France's Ginette Neveu. One of the participants was also Grażyna Bacewicz who received an honorary diploma and was to become a future juror of the competition. The two first prizes were funded by renowned Polish luthier Tomasz Panufnik.

== Prizewinners ==
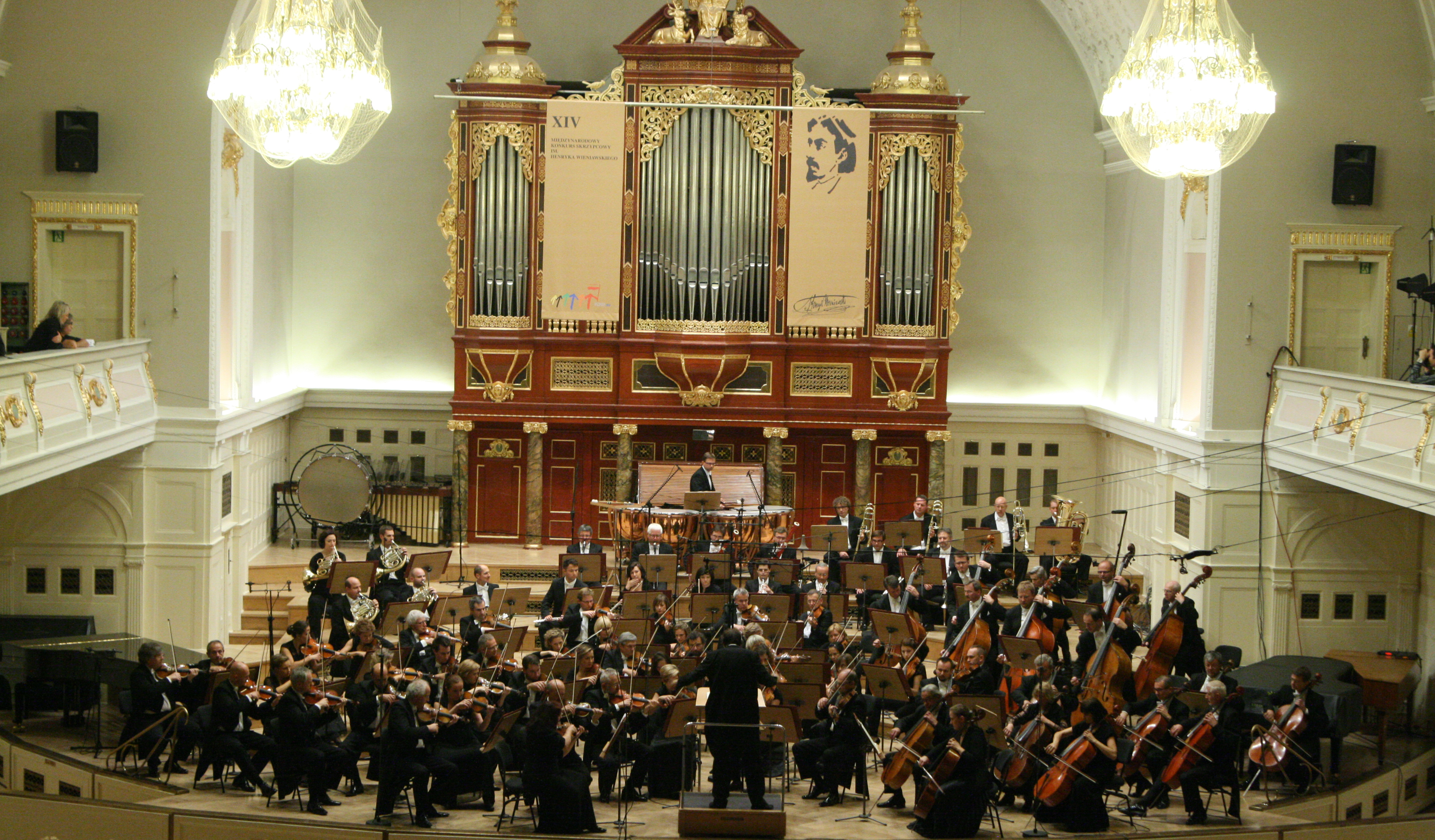
Agata Szymczewska performing with the Warsaw National Philharmonic Orchestra at the Henryk Wieniawski Violin Competition in 2011.

=== 2026 ===
1. (Ukraine) Bohdan Luts
2. (China) Jinzhu Li
3. (South Korea) SooBeen Lee
- Laureates. (South Korea) Jooha Choi & (South Korea) Anna Im & (China) Meng Zou

=== 2022 ===
1. (Japan) Hina Maeda
2. (Kazakhstan) Meruert Karmenova
3. (China) Qingzhu Weng
- Distinction. (Japan) / (Singapore) / (United States) Hana Chang & (South Korea) Jane Hyeonjin Cho & (South Korea) Dayoon You

=== 2016 ===
1. (Georgia (country)) / (Turkey) Veriko Tchumburidze
2. (South Korea) Bomsori Kim & (Japan) Seiji Okamoto
3. Not awarded
4. (United States) Luke Hsu
5. (Taiwan) / (United States) Richard Lin
6. (Poland) Maria Włoszczowska
7. (Japan) Ryosuke Suho

=== 2011 ===
1. (South Korea) Soyoung Yoon
2. (Japan) Miki Kobayashi
3. (Germany) Stefan Tarara
- Distinction. (Kazakhstan) Erzhan Kulibaev & (Russia) Aylen Pritchin & (Japan) Arata Yumi

=== 2006 ===
1. (Poland) Agata Szymczewska
2. (Japan) Airi Suzuki
3. (Poland) Anna Maria Staśkiewicz
4. (Russia) Lev Solodovnikow
5. (Poland) Maria Machowska
6. (Poland) Jarosław Nadrzycki
7. (Poland) Wojciech Pławner
- Distinction. (Russia) Simeon Klimashevskiy

=== 2001 ===
1. (Russia) Alena Baeva
2. (South Korea) Soojin Han & (Federal Republic of Yugoslavia) Roman Simowic
3. (Armenia) Gaik Kazazian & (United States) Bracha Malkin & (Japan) Hiroko Takahashi
4. (Japan) Mayuko Kamio
5. (Poland) Jaroslaw Nadrzycki
6. (United Kingdom) Alexandra Wood

=== 1996 ===
1. Not awarded
2. (Japan) Reiko Otani
3. (Japan) Akkiko Tanaka
4. (Poland) Łukasz Błaszczyk & (Japan) Asuka Sezaki
5. (Poland) Anna Reszniak
6. (Poland) Maria M. Nowak

=== 1991 ===
1. (Poland) Bartłomiej Nizioł & (Poland) Piotr Pławner
2. (Japan) Chie Abiko
3. (Japan) Reiko Shiraishi
4. (Poland) Monika Jarecka
5. (Japan) Tomoko Yoshimura

=== 1986 ===
1. (Soviet Union) Ewgenij Buszkow
2. (Japan) Nobu Wakabayashi & (Poland) Robert Kabara
3. (Soviet Union) Wiktor Kuzniecow
4. (United States) Alexander Romanul
5. (Japan) Hiroko Suzuki

=== 1981 ===
1. (Japan) Keiko Urushihara
2. (Japan) Elisa Kawaguti
3. (Poland) Aureli Błaszczok
4. (Japan) Seiji Kageyama
5. (Japan) Iwao Furusawa
6. (Japan) Megumi Shimane

=== 1977 ===
1. (Soviet Union) Vadim Brodsky
2. (Poland) Piotr Milewski & (Soviet Union) Michał Wajman
3. (Soviet Union) Zakhar Bron & (United States) Peter A. Zazofsky
4. (France) Charles A. Linale
5. (Austria) Hiro Kurosaki & (Poland) Anna A. Wódka
6. (Japan) Kazuhiko Sawa
- Awards. (Japan) Asa Konishi & (Japan) Keiko Mizuno

=== 1972 ===
1. (Soviet Union) Tatiana Grindienko
2. (Japan) Shizuka Ishikawa
3. (Poland) Barbara Górzyńska
4. (Poland) Tadeusz Gadzina & (Soviet Union) Graczija Arutunian
5. (Poland) Stefan Czermak & (Japan) Kenji Iwamoto
6. (Poland) Edward Z. Zienkowski

=== 1967 ===
1. (Poland) Piotr Janowski
2. (Soviet Union) Michał Bezwierchnyj
3. (Poland) Kaja Danczowska
4. (Soviet Union) Eduard Tatewosjan
5. (Soviet Union) Anatolij Mielnkow
6. (Poland) Michał Grabarczyk & (Bulgaria) Mincho Minchev

=== 1962 ===
1. (United States) Charles Treger
2. (Soviet Union) Oleg Krysa
3. (Poland) Krzysztof Jakowicz
4. (Soviet Union) Izabella Petrosjan
5. (Soviet Union) Mirosław Rusin & (Poland) Henryk Jarzynski & (United States) Priscilla A. Ambrose
6. (Poland) Tomasz Michalak

=== 1957 ===
1. (Soviet Union) Roza Fajn
2. (United States) Sidney Harth
3. (Soviet Union) Mark Komissarow
4. (Spain) Augustin Leon-Ara
5. (Turkey) Ayla Erduran
6. (Soviet Union) Władimir Malinin

=== 1952 ===
1. (Soviet Union) Igor Oistrakh
2. (Soviet Union) Julian Sitkovetsky & (Poland) Wanda Wiłkomirska
3. (France) Blanche Tarjus & (Soviet Union) Marina Jaszwili & (Soviet Union) Olga Parchomlenko
4. (Bulgaria) Emil Kamilarov & (Poland) Edward Statkiewicz & (Poland) Igor Iwanow & (Poland) Henryk Palulis
5. (Hungary) Csaba Bokay

=== 1935 ===
1. (France) Ginette Neveu
2. (Soviet Union) David Oistrakh
3. (United Kingdom) Henri Temianka
4. (Soviet Union) Boris Goldstein
5. (Kingdom of Yugoslavia) Ljerko Spiller
6. (Italy) Mary Luisa Sardo
7. (Poland) Ida Haendel
8. (Estonia) Hubert Anton
9. (Poland) Bronislav Gimpel

== Laureates by country ==
Country	Number
USSR	5
Poland	4
Japan	2
France	1
Georgia	1
Russia	1
South Korea	1
Turkey	1
Ukraine	1
United States	1

== See also ==
- List of classical music competitions
- Grzegorz Fitelberg International Competition for Conductors
- Chopin International Piano Competition
- World Federation of International Music Competitions
