= Václav Hudeček =

Czech violinist

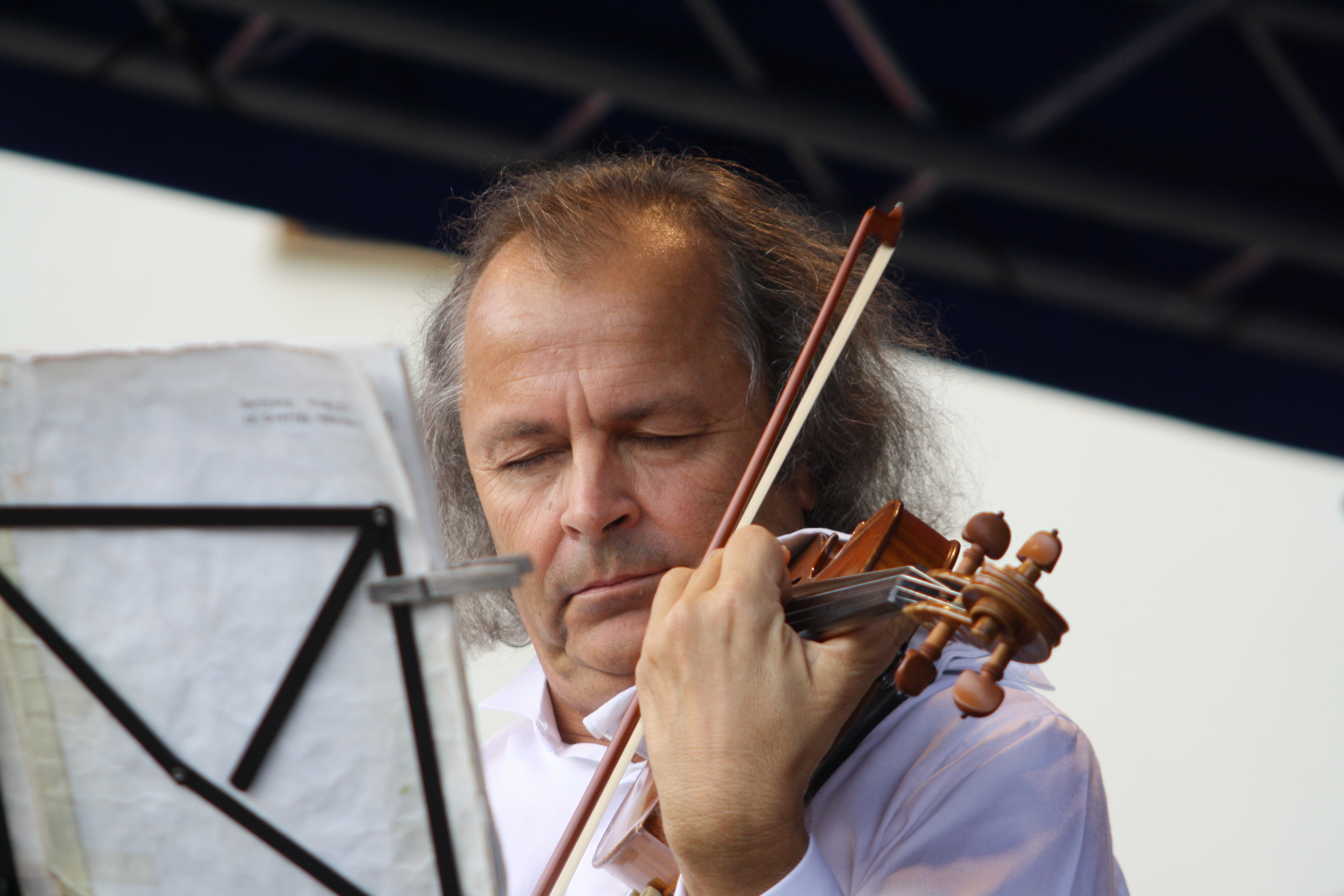
- September 2010

Background information
- Born: June 7, 1952 (age 74); Rožmitál pod Třemšínem, Czechoslovakia
- Instrument: Violin

Václav Hudeček (born June 7, 1952 in Rožmitál pod Třemšínem, Czechoslovakia) is a Czech violinist. His records have sold many copies in the Czech Republic, especially a 1992 recording of Vivaldi's The Four Seasons, certified platinum. Hudeček also runs an annual academy for promising young Czech violinists.

== Biography ==
Hudeček studied at the Prague Conservatory. On 11 November 1967, aged 15, he performed with the Royal Philharmonic Orchestra in London.

Since his London debut he has appeared in concert at venues including Carnegie Hall, the Royal Festival Hall, Suntory Hall, and Osaka Festival Hall. He has played with orchestras including the Berliner Philharmoniker, Cleveland Symphony Orchestra, and NHK Symphony Orchestra, as well as appearing at festivals including Osaka, Salzburg, Istanbul, Perth, and Helsinki). He has released records on the Supraphon label.

Hudeček's 1992 recording of Antonio Vivaldi's The Four Seasons with the conductor Pavel Kogan is the most successful classical recording ever in the Czech Republic, and has been certified gold and in 1997 platinum. Hudeček has also received golden records for other recordings.

As well as compositions by David Oistrakh, Hudeček performs works by 20th century composers including Leoš Janáček and Sergei Prokofiev, and contemporary Czech composers such as Kymlička, Fišer, and Mácha.

Hudeček has also worked as a teacher in Canada, Japan, and Germany. Since 1997 he has been organising the Václav Hudeček Academy, a 10-day course for young violinists held every August in Luhačovice. The best participants from this course are awarded a new violin and a contract to appear with Hudeček at his concerts. Violinists awarded from his academy include Josef Špaček, Marek Pavelec, and Jiří Vodička.

In 2007, Hudeček received the "National Award for Achievement in the Area of Culture and the Arts" from Czech President Václav Klaus.

Hudeček is married to actress Eva Hudečková.
