= Carl Nielsen International Music Competition =

Competition for classical musicians held in Denmark

Carl Nielsen International Competition (Danish: Carl Nielsen Konkurrencen) is a competition for classical musicians (violin, clarinet, and flute) held in Odense, Denmark, in memory of the composer Carl Nielsen.

== Overview ==
The competition was established in 1980 under the patronage of Queen Margarethe of Denmark. It became a member of the World Federation of International Music Competitions in 1981. Initially a violin competition, its first President was Henryk Szeryng. Later the competition added special editions for organists (since 1986), clarinetists (since 1997) and flutists (since 1998). At various times jury members have included Max Rostal, Joseph Gingold, Norbert Brainin, Arve Tellefsen, Milan Vitek, Dorothy DeLay, Tibor Varga, Jean-Jacques Kantorow.

Since 2012, the organ competition is no longer part of the Carl Nielsen Competition, but is instead held as a separate competition. After nearly four decades, the violin, clarinet, and flute competitions are demanding and rewarding. Winners are often given the chance to launch a significant international career. Since 2019, the Carl Nielsen International Competitions for violin, clarinet and flute are held concurrently. Representing the 2019 competition as Artistic Advisors were three of the world's leading musicians in their fields – Nikolaj Znaider, Emmanuel Pahud and Martin Fröst.

During the 2022 edition of the competition a mentoring program called Espansiva! was held concurrently. The aim of this new program is to run alongside future editions of competition and to offer participants advice and insight during their time in Odense. During Espansiva! 2022, 10 talks were given by guest experts, soloists and musicians and 4 complementary workshops. There was opportunity for individual conversations with members of the Espansiva! team and each evening both participants and guest speakers were invited to "relax and eat together" at the aptly named Anarkist brewery located in Odense. The name Espansiva! comes from Nielsen's Symphony No. 3 which also goes by the name Espansiva!

== Prizes ==
=== Current prizes ===
==== 1st Prize ====
The 1st prize includes a sum of 25,000 Euros as well as a recording deal with Orchid Classics and the Odense Symphony Orchestra with an approximate value of 13,000 Euros. The winner of this prize is also offered to appear as a soloist with top nordic orchestra's. In addition the 1st Prize winner of the Violin competition will also receive a bow made by Duncan Emck, donated by Ulf Eriksson Violins of Copenhagen.

==== 2nd Prize ====
2nd Prize winner will be awarded 10,000 Euros.

==== 3rd Prize ====
3rd Prize winner will be awarded 7,500 Euros

==== Special Prizes ====
Odense Symphony Orchestra Prize: 1,000 Euros awarded among the violin, Clarinet and Flute finalists. Junior Jury Prize: 1,000 Euros awarded among the Violin, Clarinet and Flute finalists. Audience Prize: 1,000 Euros awarded among the Violin, Clarinet and Flute finalists. Prize for best interpretation / Prize for Playing around Nielsen: 1,000 Euros awarded for the best performance of new piece commissioned for the violin competition and 1,000 Euros awarded amongst the 2nd round candidates of the flute and the clarinet competitions performing playing around Nielsen.

== Prize-winners ==
=== Violin ===
==== 1980 ====
- 1st Prize: (United States) Kathleen Winkler
- 2nd Prize: (Sweden) Per Enoksson
- 3rd Prize: (Japan) Hozumi Murata
- 4th Prize: (Romania) Adriana Rosin
- 5th Prize: (Poland) Grazyna Skowron
- 6th Prize: (Romania) Marius Nichiteanu

==== 1984 ====
- 1st Prize: (Japan) Osamu Yaguchi
- 2nd Prize: (Romania) Lenuta Ciulei-Atanasiu
- 3rd Prize: (Denmark) Johannes Søe Hansen
- 4th Prize: (Poland) Jaroslaw Zolnierczyk
- 5th Prize: (Denmark) Jacob Friis
- 6th Prize: (Germany) Anne Yuuko Akahoshi

==== 1988 ====
- 1st Prize: (USSR) Alexei Kochvanets
- 2nd Prize: (East Germany) Heike Janicke
- 3rd Prize: (Japan) Joji Hattori
- 4th Prize: (United States) Nicole Monahan
- 5th Prize: (Iceland) Sigrun Edvaldsdottir
- 6th Prize: (Poland) Beata Warykiewicz

==== 1992 ====
- 1st Prize: (Denmark) Nikolaj Znaider
- 2nd Prize: (United States) Jennifer Koh
- 3rd Prize: (Finland) Pekka Kuusisto
- 4th Prize: (Russia) Ilja Sekler
- 5th Prize: Not awarded
- 6th Prize: (Georgia) Vladislav Adelkhanov

==== 1996 ====
- 1st Prize: (Australia) Adele Anthony
- 2nd Prize (shared): (Sweden) Malin Broman and (Finland) Jaakko Kuusisto
- 3rd Prize: Not awarded
- 4th Prize: Not awarded
- 5th Prize: (United States) Esther Noh
- 6th Prize: (Hungary) Tamás András

==== 1999 ====
- 1st Prize: (Israel) Leor Maltinski
- 2nd Prize: (Japan) Saeka Matsuyama
- 3rd Prize: (Japan) Mariko Inaba

==== 2000 ====
- 1st Prize: (Japan) Masaaki Tanokura
- 2nd Prize: (Ukraine) Dmytro Tkachenko
- 3rd Prize: (Denmark) Mikkel Futtrup
- 4th Prize: (Poland) Mariusz Patyra

==== 2004 ====
- 1st Prize: (South Korea) Hyuk Joo Kwun
- 2nd Prize: (United States) Erin Keefe
- 3rd Prize: (South Korea) Ui-Youn Hong
- 4th Prize: (Canada) Judy Kang

==== 2008 ====
- 1st Prize: (Armenia) Hrachya Avanesyan
- 2nd Prize: (Japan) Yusuke Hayashi
- 3rd Prize: (Czech Republic) Josef Spacek
- 4th Prize: (Romania) Eugen Tichindeleanu

==== 2012 ====
- 1st Prize: (Russia) Olga Volkova
- 2nd Prize: (Denmark) Niklas Walentin Jensen
- 3rd Prize: (Iceland) Eva Thorarinsdottir
- 4th Prize: (South Korea) Ui-Youn Hong

==== 2016 ====
- 1st Prize (shared): (Bulgaria) Liya Petrova and (South Korea) Ji Yoon Lee
- 2nd Prize: Not awarded
- 3rd Prize: (United States) Luke Hsu
- 4th Prize (shared): (South Korea) Soo-Hyun Park, (South Korea) Ji Won Song, and (Japan) Karen Kido

==== 2019 ====
- 1st Prize: (Sweden) Johan Dalene
- 2nd Prize: (France) Marie-Astrid Hulot
- 3rd Prize: (Denmark) Anna Agafia Egholm

2022

- 1st Prize (shared): (Estonia) Hans Christian Aavik and (Ukraine) Bohdan Luts
- 2nd Prize: Not awarded
- 3rd Prize: (South Korea) Eun Che Kim

=== Flute ===
==== 1998 ====
- 1. Prize: (Austria) Karl-Heinz Schütz
- 2. Prize: (Japan) Kazunori Seo
- 3. Prize: (Germany) Henrik Wiese
- 4. Prize: (Germany) Natalie Schwaabe

==== 2002 ====
- 1. Prize: (Germany) Pirmin Grehl
- 2. Prize: (Russia) Denis Bouriakov
- 3. Prize: (Hungary) Fruzsina Varga
- 4. Prize: (Austria) (Switzerland) Sarah Rumer

==== 2006 ====
- 1. Prize: (Russia) Alexandra Grot
- 2. Prize: (Poland) Lukasz Dlugosz
- 3. Prize: ex aequo: (France) Marion Ralincourt and (Russia) Grigory Mordashov

==== 2010 ====
- 1. Prize: (Portugal) Adriana Ferreira
- 2. Prize: (Russia) Zoya Vyazovskaya
- 3. Prize: (Argentina) Maria Cecilia Munoz
- 4. Prize: (Iceland) Melkorka Ólafsdóttir

==== 2014 ====
- 1. Prize: (Switzerland) Sébastian Jacot
- 2. Prize: (Japan) Yukie Ota
- 3. Prize: (South Korea) Yaeram Park

==== 2019 ====
- 1. Prize: (France) Joséphine Olech
- 2. Prize: (Poland) Marianna Julia Żołnacz
- 3. Prize: (Spain) Rafael Adobas Bayog

==== 2022 ====
- 1. (Italy) Alberto Navarra
- 2. (South Korea) Seoyeon Kim
- 3. (Spain) Alberto Acuna Almela

==== 2026 ====
- 1. (Italy) Federico Altare
- 2. (United Kingdom) Sofía Patterson-Gutiérrez
- 3. (United States) Ethan Nylander.

=== Clarinet ===
==== 1997 ====
- 1. Prize: (Greece) Spyros Mourikis
- 2. Prize: (United States) Igor Begelman
- 3. Prize: (Italy) Carlo Failli
- 4. Prize: (Finland) Anne Piirainen

==== 2001 ====
- 1. Prize: (United States) Alexander Fiterstein
- 2. Prize: (France) Nicolas Baldeyrou
- 3. Prize: (Germany) Jens Thoben
- 4. Prize: (France) Sebastien Batut

==== 2005 ====
- 1. Prize: (France) Olivier Patey
- 2. Prize: (France) Olivier Vivarès
- 3. Prize: (Norway) Björn Nyman
- 4. Prize: (France) Vincent Penot

==== 2009 ====
- 1. Prize: (Finland) Olli Leppäniemi
- 2. Prize: (France) Christelle Pochet
- 3. Prize: (Austria) Daniel Ottensamer
- 4. Prize: (Hungary) Balazs Rumy

==== 2013 ====
- 1. Prize: (Russia) Sergey Eletskiy
- 2. Prize: (Denmark) Mathias Kjøller
- 3. Prize: (South Korea) Inn-Hyuck Cho
- 4. Prize: (France) Pierre Genisson

==== 2019 ====
- 1. Prize: (Slovenia) Blaz Sparovec
- 2. Prize: (Italy) Aron Chiesa
- 3. Prize: (Spain) Víctor Díaz Guerra

==== 2022 ====
- 1. (Ukraine) Oleg Shebeta-Dragan
- 2. (France) Ann Lepage
- 3. (Greece) Panagiotis Giannakas

=== Organ ===
==== 1986 ====
- 1. Prize: not awarded
- 2. Prize: (Denmark) Jesper Madsen
- 3. Prize: (United Kingdom) Kevin Bowyer

==== 1988 ====
- 1. Prize: (Germany) Andreas Liebig
- 2. Prize: (Japan) Kayo Ohara
- 3. Prize: (Finland) Anne Nietosvaara

==== 1990 ====
- 1. Prize: (United Kingdom) Kevin Bowyer
- 2. Prize: (Denmark) Bine Katrine Bryndorf
- 3. Prize: (Japan) Yuzuru Hiranaka

==== 1992 ====
- 1. Prize: (Australia) Christopher Wrench
- 2. Prize: (United Kingdom) Stephen Farr
- 3. Prize: (Germany) Christian Schmitt
- 4. Prize: (France) Pascale Melis
- 5. Prize: (Germany) Paul Theis

==== 1994 ====
- 1. Prize: not awarded
- 2. Prize: (Japan) Rie Hiroe
- 3. Prize - Ex Aequo: (Italy) Walter Savant-Levet and (Russia) Marina Zagorski
- 4. Prize: (Germany) Stefan Kordes
- 5. Prize: (France) Frédéric Desenclos

==== 1996 ====
- 1. Prize: (Denmark) Hanne Kuhlmann
- 2. Prize: (France) Veronique le Guen
- 3. Prize: (Germany) Torsten Laux
- 4. Prize: (South Korea) Jin Kim
- 5. Prize: (Denmark) Heinrich Christensen

==== 1998 ====
- 1. Prize: (Germany) Johannes Unger
- 2. Prize: (United Kingdom) Teilhard Scott
- 3. Prize: (Germany) Torsten Laux
- 4. Prize: (Germany) Samuel Kummer
- 5. Prize: (Hungary) Làszló Deàk

==== 2000 ====
- 1. Prize: not awarded
- 2. Prize - Ex Aequo: (United Kingdom) Sarah Baldock and (United Kingdom) Charles Harrison
- 3. Prize: (Sweden) Christina Blomkvist
- 4. Prize: (Germany) Burkhard Just
- 5. Prize: (Hungary) Hedvig Dobias

==== 2002 ====
- 1. Prize: not awarded
- 2. Prize: (Switzerland) Burkhard Just
- 3. Prize: (Germany) Helene von Rechenberg
- 4. Prize: (Estonia) Katrin Meriloo

==== 2004 ====
- 1. Prize: (United Kingdom) William Whitehead
- 2. Prize: (United Kingdom) Clive Driskill-Smith
- 3. Prize - Ex Aequo: (South Korea) So-Hyun Park and (Austria) Johannes Hämmerle

==== 2007 ====
- 1. Prize: (United Kingdom) Henry Fairs
- 2. Prize: (Netherlands) Gijs Boelen
- 3. Prize: (Denmark) Daniel Bruun
- 4. Prize: (United States) Ruth Draper

==== 2011 ====
- 1. Prize: (Denmark) Philip Schmidt-Madsen
- 2. Prize: (United Kingdom) Timothy Wakerell
- 3. Prize: (Germany) Simon Menges
