= Rebecca Penneys =

American-born pianist (born 1946)

Rebecca Penneys (born 1946) is an American-born pianist of Russian-Ukrainian-Jewish descent. She is a recitalist, chamber musician, orchestral soloist, educator, and adjudicator. In 1965, she was the youngest contestant to enter the International Chopin Competition in Warsaw.

== Early life ==
Rebecca Penneys was born on October 2, 1946. Her mother, Rose Kaplan Penneys (1912–2010), worked for social causes, and her father, Alexander Penneys (1912–1994), was a doctor. Sol Kaplan, her uncle, was a pianist-conductor-composer, and her cousin, Boris Gorelick, was an artist.

Raised as a prodigy, Penneys grew up in Los Angeles studying piano from the age of 3, and dance from the age of 5. Her primary mentors in California were Carmelita Maracci, dance, Victoria Front and Aube Tzerko, piano, and Leonard Stein, composition. She performed her first solo piano recital at the age of 9 and performed as soloist with the Los Angeles Philharmonic at the age of 11. Other mentors were Rosina Lhévinne and Artur Rubinstein.

== Education and career ==
Penneys attended Beverly Hills High School and continued her formal education at Indiana University School of Music in Bloomington, Indiana, studying piano with György Sebők and Menahem Pressler, chamber music with Janos Starker and Josef Gingold, and composition with Iannis Xenakis. She advanced into the semi-finals at the Seventh International Chopin Piano Competition in Warsaw.

She was awarded third prize in the 1975 Second Paloma O'Shea Santander International Piano Competition in Spain. In 1972, she made her New York debut at Alice Tully Hall. The same year she was appointed to the faculty of the University of North Carolina School of the Arts. In 1974, she founded the New Arts Trio at the Wisconsin Conservatory of Music (with Carol Sindell, violin and Hamilton Cheifetz, cello). The Trio won the Naumburg Award for Chamber Music in 1980 (with Piotr Janowski, violin and Steven Doane, cello). The Trio was Trio-in-Residence at the Chautauqua Institution from 1978 to 2012 and has made two United States Information Agency Cultural State Department tours of Europe in 1985 and 1987. Penneys made a USIS State Department solo tour of Japan in 1980. She has taught and performed in such summer festivals as Sitka, Marlboro, Eastern, Aspen, Vermont Mozart, Montreal, Shawnigan Johannesen, Tel Hai Israel, Peninsula, Roycroft, Mammoth Lakes, Chautauqua, and Music Mountain.

== Current professional life ==
Penneys was professor of piano at the Eastman School of Music from 1980 to 2017 and chairwoman of the Chautauqua Institution Piano Department from 1985 to 2012. She now holds the title of Professor Emerita of Piano at Eastman School of Music. She was a resident artist as pianist-founder of the New Arts Trio at Chautauqua from 1978 to 2012. In 2013, Rebecca launched the Rebecca Penneys Friends of Piano (non-profit 501c3) and the Rebecca Penneys Piano Festival as a sequel to her well-known Chautauqua piano program.

RPPF is an intense 3-week immersion piano festival. In 2017, she launched RPPF-Mini, a 3-day boot-camp for graduate pianists on career strategies. The University of South Florida in Tampa hosts the festival and Mini in its all-Steinway facility every July. Both RPPF and RPPF-Mini are tuition-free for college-age students worldwide. In 1999, she co-founded the Salon Chamber Music Series, a five concert series with Mikhail Kopelman, violin and Stefan Reuss, cello held at the Rochester Academy of Medicine. In 2001, she was appointed Artist-in-Residence at St. Petersburg College in St. Petersburg, Florida where she is director of the SPC Piano Series. In 2015, she was given a courtesy position as Steinway-Artist-in-Residence at the University of South Florida in Tampa. A devoted teacher, she has received recognition for teaching a keyboard technique (Motion and Emotion) that allows pianists to achieve individual performance goals without physical strain or injury. She was inducted into the Steinway Teacher Hall of Fame in 2021. Combining a busy concert schedule with seminars and master classes worldwide, she teaches international students at Eastman School of Music and at the Rebecca Penneys Piano Festival. Her current and former students include prizewinners in international competitions, and they hold teaching posts on every continent. Penneys is a Steinway Artist and has given special concerts for Steinway & Sons.

== Works ==
=== Solo CDs, DVDs and HD Videos ===
On YouTube

- Piano House Concert Performance - Chopin Op.25
- Piano House Performance - Brahms Op 39, Beethoven Klavierstūke
- Rebecca Penneys: A Personal and Musical Portrait, Brahms Op 5, Debussy, De Falla
- Legacy: Rebecca Penneys plays Chopin - B Min Sonata, Op.27, Berceuse, Scherzo
- Piano House Concert: Rebecca Penneys plays Soler, Scarlatti, Brahms and Piano Rags

Centaur Records:

- Voice of the Piano CRC 2159
- Complete Chopin Etudes CRC 2210

Fleur De Son Classics:

- All Brahms FDS 57938
- Recital Gems from Chautauqua FDS 67956
- Music of the Dance FDS
- An Eastman Recital FDS 57968
- Rebecca Penneys & Steinway FDS 57971
- Bicentennial Tribute FDS 58012
- Rebecca Penneys: A Personal and Musical Portrait FDS 58037 Blu-Ray DVD
- Legacy: Rebecca Penneys plays Frédéric Chopin FDS 58045 Blu-Ray DVD
- Piano House Concert: Rebecca Penneys plays Soler, Scarlatti, Brahms and Piano Rags FDS 58050 DVD

=== Trio recordings ===
Fleur De Son Classics:

- Beethoven Arrangements for Piano Trio FDS 57931
- New Arts Trio in Recital FDS 57957
- New Arts Trio: 30th Anniversary Recital FDS 58000
- Society For Chamber Music; New Arts Trio: Beethoven Archduke SCMR 0005—1998
- Rochester Academy Of Medicine; Centennial Concert 2001

=== Publications ===
- "Chicken Soup for Pianists" a virtual book (text and video), available on Kindle & iBooks (2020)
- "Fundamentals of Flow in Learning Music" by Rebecca Penneys & Ray Gottlieb (1993–1994)
- "Harmful Practices That Cause Injuries"
- Clavier Magazine, The Instrumentalist (1994)
- "Motion and Emotion", Clavier Magazine, The Instrumentalist (1992)
- "For Carmelita", Leaflets – University of Rochester (1991)
- Guest Editor, Seminars in Neurology, Thieme Publications, New York (1989)
- "Motion and Emotion: A Discussion of the Interaction Between Physical Motion and Human Emotion", Seminars in Neurology, Thieme Publications (1989)
- "Maachem" (1979)
