= Nocturne and Tarantella (Szymanowski) =

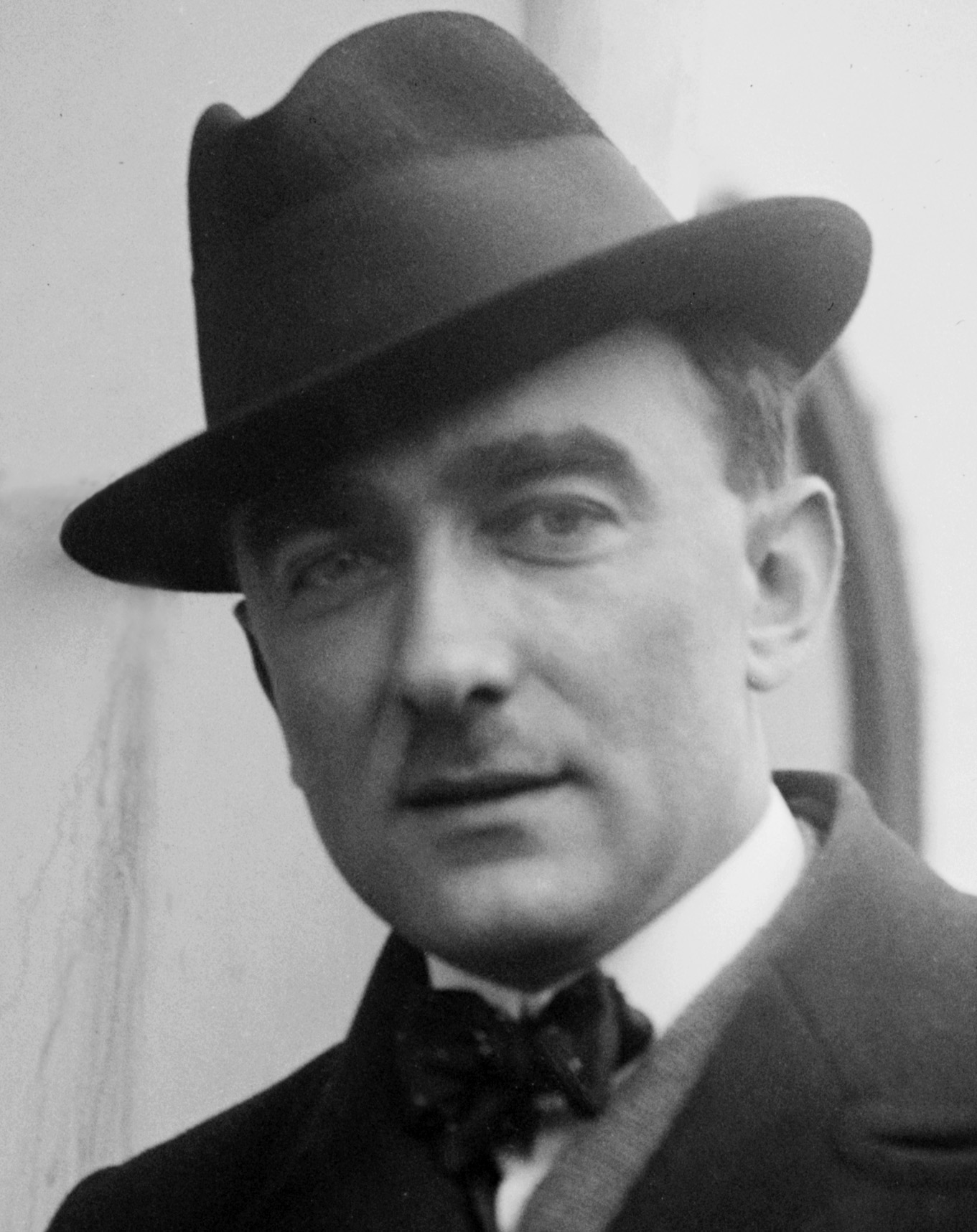
Karol Szymanowski in 1922

Nocturne and Tarantella, Op. 28, is a composition for violin and piano, written in the spring and summer of 1915 by the Polish composer Karol Szymanowski.

It was first performed in Warsaw on 24 January 1920, by Paweł Kochański and Feliks Szymanowski (the composer's elder brother), and published in 1921. It is dedicated to the composer's friend August Iwański, at whose estate Ryżawka, and Józef Jaroszyński's manor in Zarudzie, the work was written. It lasts about 10 minutes in total.

The Nocturne is in the key of B minor, having mainly long elegant lines soaring high above the piano accompaniment, but also sometimes diverts off the pathway into a Spanish idiom (Szymanowski had recently returned from a Mediterranean journey), and is alternately languid and febrile. The Tarantella is conversely in E minor, written a typically relentless Neapolitan 6/8 rhythm, with left-hand pizzicatos, double stopping and other effects. It was sketched during a single evening of drinking with Kochánski and Iwánski at Zarudzie. It has impressionistic overtones redolent of Debussy and early Stravinsky, but is also pervaded with the flavors of the Middle East, similarly to many of his works.

In 1937, Grzegorz Fitelberg arranged it for violin and orchestra. There is also a version for string quartet, arranged by Myroslav Skoryk.

Nocturne and Tarantella has been recorded numerous times, first by Yehudi Menuhin and Marcel Gazelle in 1937, and subsequently by artists such as Ida Haendel and Adela Kotowska; Wanda Wiłkomirska and Tadeusz Chmielewski; Kaja Danczowska and Krystian Zimerman; Peter Pławner and Waldemar Malicki; Kyung-wha Chung, Ulf Hoelscher, Alina Ibragimova, Konstanty Andrzej Kulka, Johanna Martzy, Nathan Milstein and Aaron Rosand are other violinists who have recorded Nocturne and Tarantella.
