= Marek Pavelec =

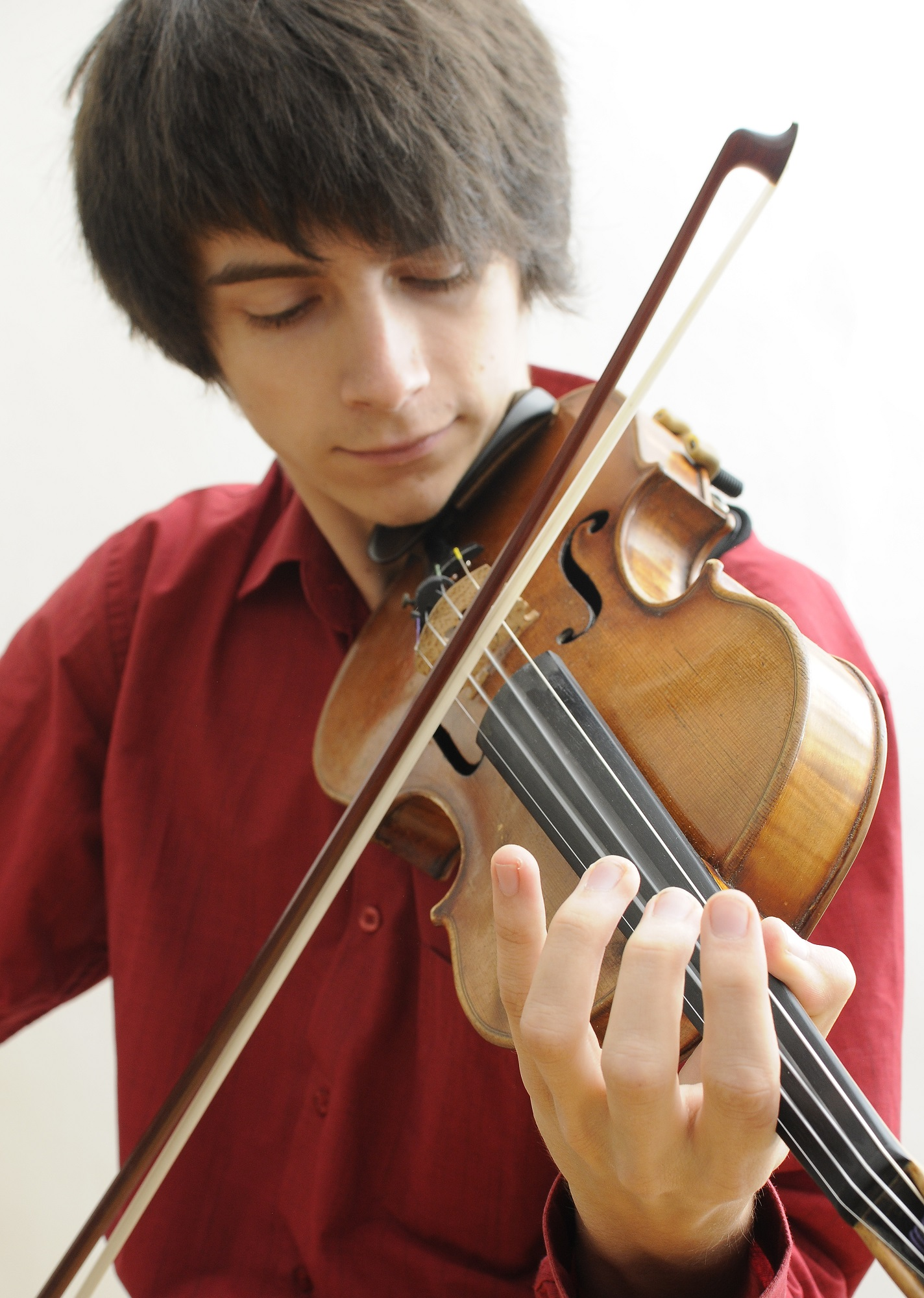

Background information
- Born: 10 September 1989 (age 35); Karlovy Vary, Czechoslovakia
- Genres: Classical
- Occupation: violinist

Marek Pavelec (born 10 September 1989) is a Czech solo violinist, laureate of international competitions and student of Zakhar Bron.

He studied at Plzeň Conservatory and Vienna Music University before becoming a student of Zakhar Bron in Zurich, Switzerland. Furthermore, he took part in Masterclasses of Julia Fischer and Ida Haendel.

Marek Pavelec is a laureate of International Violin Competition Vaclav Huml in Zagreb (2013), the winner of International Violin Competition Camillo Sivori in Cosenza, Italy, and the winner of the Vaclav Hudecek Academy in Luhacovice (2010).

As a soloist, Marek Pavelec has performed worldwide accompanied by different philharmonic orchestras (Plzeň Symphony Orchestra, Bohuslav Martinu Symphony orchestra Zlín, Bratislava Chamber Philharmonic, Karlovy Vary Symphony Orchestra, Concert des Cites Unies Orchestra, Barocco Sempre Giovane chamber orchestra, Symphony Orchestra of Cologne Music University, Croatian Radio and Television Orchestra).
