= Vladislav Adelkhanov =

Georgian violinist

Vladislav Adelkhanov (born 7 March 1970) is a Georgian violinist, teacher and writer.

== Biography ==
Born and raised in Tbilisi, Vladislav Adelkhanov started to play violin at the age of seven. He first studied with David Reizner at a regular neighborhood music school, and as a school pupil performed with the Georgian National Symphony Orchestra concertos by Bruch, Mozart, Vivaldi and Wieniawski as well as Symphonie espagnole by Lalo. Between 1986 and 1989 he studied with Olga Voitova at the Moscow Conservatoire Music College. In August 1987 he represented Soviet Union at the International Music Festival in Nyírbátor, Hungary where he performed Tchaikovsky's Souvenir d'un lieu cher. In November 1987 he won the competition for the performance of Mendelssohn's violin concerto in the Pillar Hall of the House of the Unions. In 1988 — 1989 he was a leader of the college's Symphony Orchestra. He holds Master's degree from the Moscow Conservatoire, which he graduated in 1994 from the class of Maya Glezarova. In 1997 he completed Advanced Instrumental Studies Course with Yfrah Neaman at the Guildhall School of Music and Drama.

Between 1989 and 1994 he led several Baroque and Classical period HIP projects, based on Bylsma and Harnoncourt methods. In 1992 he was awarded the 6th prize at the 4th Carl Nielsen International Violin Competition, and also won a special prize for the best performance of Poul Ruders' Variations for Violin Solo written especially for that year's competition. Between 1993 and 1996 he worked in the Moscow Symphony Orchestra, and as a leader and an assistant conductor of the Moscow Amadeus Orchestra, partnering with conductors Vladimir Simkin, Helmuth Rilling and Arpad Joó. Between 1998 and 2000 he worked as a deputy leader in the Moscow Virtuosi Orchestra. In 1999 he gave solo recitals in London, Solihull and Glasgow, and recorded at CaVa Studios. In January 2000 under the name Vladislav Steinberg his book Travels was published in Moscow by Galaktika Publishing House.

Between 2000 and 2005 he taught violin and viola and conducted the orchestra at St Leonards School. In the 2004–2005 season he was appointed leader of the University of St Andrews Symphony Orchestra. His 2004 solo appearances included Bach, Mozart, Beethoven, Tchaikovsky and Sibelius concertos played in Brechin Cathedral, Caird Hall, Greyfriars Church and Younger Hall respectively. Earlier still, in December 2001 he performed 24 Capriccios by Niccolo Paganini in St John's, Smith Square. His musical collaborations include conductors Gillian Craig, Stephen Doughty and Ralph Jamieson, cellist Robin Mason, pianists Stephen Gutman and Gilmour Macleod. Between 1999 and 2005 he performed under the stage name Vladislav Steinberg.

While living in London between 2005 and 2010 he wrote a book of memoirs Impressions and translated into Russian E. M. Forster’s novel Howards End and Vladimir Nabokov’s novel The Real Life of Sebastian Knight. In 2009 he completed a course and received a certificate in Integrative psychotherapy at the Regent's College. Between 2010 and 2014 he lived in Moscow where he wrote a book of short stories and poems The Visit. In 2014 he participated in the cultural projects hosted by Shalom Bulgaria and the South-West University "Neofit Rilski". In December 2014 he was awarded the 1st prize in the prose category for that year by Chicago based Russian language literary magazine Lexicon for his 2011 short story Translator Sergey. Between 2019 and 2022, he worked in Klaipėda and Vilnius where he recorded at MAMA Studios.

== Personal life ==
Vladislav Adelkhanov is a great-grandson of Simon Steinberg and a nephew of Emil Adelkhanov.
