= Erzhan Kulibaev =

Kazakh-Spanish violinist (born 1986)

Erzhan Kulibaev (Kazakh: Erjan Qulybaev; born 21 September 1986) is a Spanish violinist of Kazakh origin.

== Education ==
Kulibaev began his formal musical education in 1995 at the Republican Special Music School for Talented Children of Kulyash Baiseitova (in Almaty, Kazakhstan) in the class of N. M. Patrusheva. In 1998 he moved to the Moscow Conservatory, where he studied in the class of A. V. Revich. In 2004 he started studies in the class of Zakhar Bron at the Queen Sofía College of Music in Madrid and the Master programme in the Glinka State Conservatory in Novosibirsk.

== Career ==
Erzhan Kulibaev has won many prizes at international violin competitions:

- Demidovski International Violin Vompetition in Yekaterinburg (2003, First Prize and two Special prizes)
- International Violin Competition in Lisbon (2006, First Prize and Special prize for the best interpretation of a work by L.Graça)
- International Violin Competition in Novosibirsk (2007, First Prize and special prize of Paloma O’Shea)
- International Hindemith Competition in Berlin (2010, Gold medal and Special prize for the best interpretation of a work by Robert Schumann)
- Henryk Wieniawski Violin Competition in Poznań (2011, Distinction and two special prizes).
- International violin competition in Buenos-Aires, 1st prize and "Premio Tango" for best interpretation of argentine tango.

He has performed in France, Germany, Switzerland, Japan, Belgium, Mexico, Portugal, Ukraine, Latvia, Italy, Kuwait, Russia, Kazakhstan, Austria, Spain, and Poland. He played as a soloist with the State Symphony Orchestra of Kazakhstan, the Opera and Ballet Symphony Orchestra of Astana, the Camerata of Kazakhstan, the Academy of the Soloists, the Camera Orchestra of the Philharmonic Society of Moscow, the Camera Orchestra of the Academic Choir of Sankt-Petersburg, the Symphony Orchestra of Yucatan, the Symphony Orchestra of the State Conservatory of Novosibirsk, the Symphony Orchestra of Astana, the Symphony Orchestra of Karaganda, the Symphony Orchestra of the Queen Sofia College of Music, the University of Alicante's Philharmonic Orchestra, the Symphony Orchestra of Castilla y Leon. In 2005-2006 he participated in the International Festival of Music in Santander, Spain. In 2006 and 2010 he received an Honorary Diploma as the best student of Z. Bron from the Queen of Spain and performed in the Royal Palace of Pardo. In 2010 he performed in the Konzerthaus Berlin.

Kulibaev plays the Stradivarius “Rode” 1722 courtesy of the Maggini Foundation.
