= Gaik Kazazian =

Gaik Kazazian (born 1982) is an Armenian violinist, laureate of the III prize of the Henryk Wieniawski Violin Competition in 2001.

== Awards ==
- "The winner of the first premium of Republican competition of violinists (1994)"
- "The owner of the Gold medal and Grand Prix of competition of violinists Amadeus-95 (Belgium)"
- "The owner of a special prize " For masterly execution " at the International competition of violinists in Germany (1997)"
- Winner - "Wieniawski Competition in Poznan (2001)"
- Winner - "Marguerite Long and Jacques Thibaud Competition in Paris (2002)"
- "Awarded by Gold Medal and Audience Choice Prize at the violinist’s competition in Switzerland (2004)"
- Winner - "Paganini Competition in Moscow (2005)"
- Winner - "Gold Medal and Audience Choice Prize at the violinist’s competition in Tongyong (South Korea, 2007)"
- Laureate of Tchaikovsky Competition ( 3rd prize ) in 2015
