= Piotr Janowski =

Polish violinist (1951–2008)

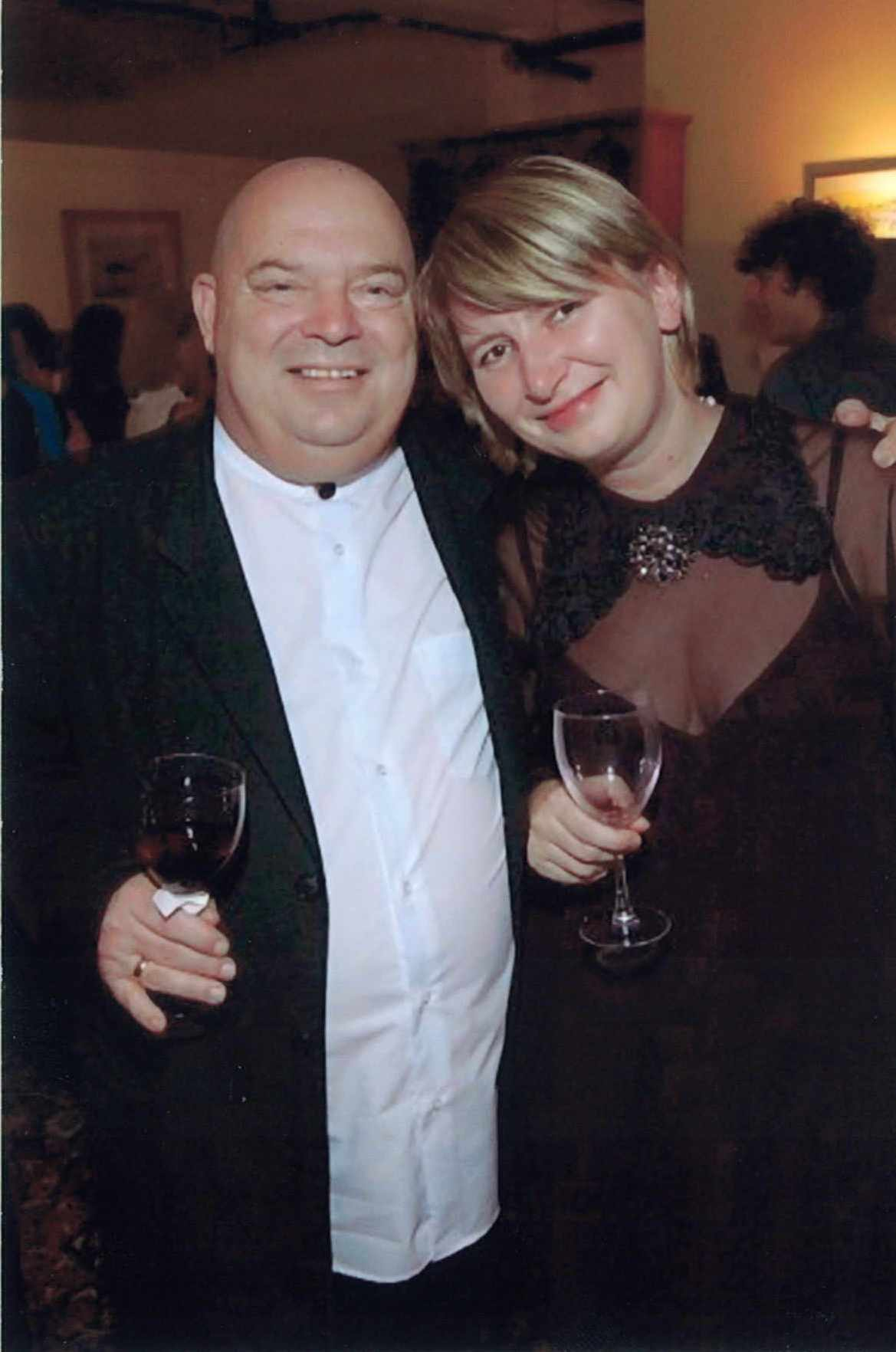
Piotr Janowski with his wife Joanna Maklakiewicz at a wedding

Piotr Janowski (5 February 1951 – 6 December 2008) was a Polish violinist and first Polish winner of the Henryk Wieniawski Violin Competition.

Janowski was born in Grudziądz, Poland. At the age of 16 in 1967, he won the V International Henryk Wieniawski Violin Competition in Poznań, Poland. He graduated with distinction from The Higher State School of Music in Warsaw where he completed the five-year course in one academic year in the class of Irena Dubiska (1969–1970).

He continued his studies at the Curtis Institute of Music in Philadelphia with Ivan Galamian and later at the Juilliard School of Music in New York as pupil of Galamian and Zino Francescatti. In 1974, invited by Henryk Szeryng and Zino Francescatti, Janowski studied at the Summer Masterclass in Montreux, Switzerland. Between 1975 and 1977 he was a private scholar of Jascha Heifetz at the University of Southern California in Los Angeles.

He was a citizen of Poland and the United States; he also was an honorary citizen of Arkansas, USA and the city of Cognac, France.

He died in London, United Kingdom, and is buried at Powązki cemetery in Warsaw.

== Artistic activity ==
As a soloist Janowski played with the most important orchestras in the United States and Europe, including New York Philharmonic, Philadelphia Orchestra, Saint Louis Symphony Orchestra, Minnesota Orchestra, Oslo Philharmonic, Warsaw Philharmonic Orchestra. He performed with Leonard Bernstein, Leonard Slatkin, Eugene Ormandy, Erich Leinsdorf, Stanisław Wisłocki, Andrzej Markowski, Bogusław Madey, Karol Stryja, William Smith and Walter Hendel.

He was accompanied by Mieczysław Horszowski, Arthur Balsam, Peter Serkin, Franco Agostini, Wolfgang Plagge, Jerzy Lefeld, Maciej Paderewski, Jerzy Marchwiński, Zofia Vogtman, Paul Berkowitz, Cynthia Raim, Roman Markowicz, Steven Meyer, Golda Tetz and his wife, Joanna Maklakiewicz.

Since 1976 Janowski was a member of the New Arts Trio. He took part in numerous music festivals (Marlboro, VT, Chautauqua, NY, Dimitrios and Warsaw Autumn). He was lecturer at the Wisconsin Conservatory of Music in Milwaukee, Eastman School of Music in Rochester, state New York and Barratt-Due Institute of Music in Oslo, Norway. He led masterclasses at Conservatorio di Bologna, Thessaloniki Conservatory, Ohio State University, Columbus, Evenstone, The Oberlin College and Northwestern University.

The violin he played was a 1722 Guarneri del Gesu.

== Prizes ==
- First Prize at Fifth International Henryk Wieniawski Violin Competition, Poznań, Poland, 1967
- First Prize at Philadelphia Orchestra Competition, Philadelphia, USA, 1972
- First Prize at G. B. Dealey Competition, Dallas, USA, 1974
- First Prize (together with New Arts Trio, consisted: Rebecca Penneys – piano, Steven Doane - cello) at The Walter W. Naumburg Competition, New York, USA, 1979
- First Prize (together with New Arts Trio, consisted: Rebecca Penneys – piano, Steven Doane - cello) at The Walter W. Naumburg Competition, New York, USA, 1980

== World first performances ==
- 1968, Warsaw, Poland – Marian Sawa Improvisazione for violin solo
- 1969, Warsaw, Poland – Grażyna Bacewicz VII Violin Concerto (Warsaw Autumn, Warsaw Philharmonic Orchestra, Andrzej Markowski - conductor)
- 1976, New York, USA – David Diamond III Violin Concerto (New York Philharmonic, Leonard Bernstein - conductor)
- 1980, Madison, USA – Yehuda Yannay Concertino for Violin and Chamber Orchestra
- 1980, Milwaukee, USA – Burt Levy Chamber Music for Violin Alone
- 1980, New York, USA – Robert Moevs Introduction and Presto for piano trio
- 1982, Rochester, USA – John Harbison Quartet for clarinet, violin, cello and piano
- 1982, New York, USA – Sidney Hodgkison Piano Trio
- 1983, New York USA – John Eaton In Mernoriam Mario Cristini - Trio
- 1991, Rio de Janeiro, Brasil – Emani Aguiar Meloritmas 44
- 1994, Oslo, Norway – Wolfgang Plagge Asteroide Suite for violin and piano
- 1994, Oslo, Norway – Wolfgang Plagge Rhapsody for violin solo
- 1997, Poznań, Poland – Wolfgang Plagge Sonata for violin and piano
- 1998, Oslo, Norway – Wolfgang Plagge Lucky Man House – chamber music with dancers

== Recordings ==
- W. A. Mozart Violin Concerto in D Major KV 218, K. Szymanowski I Violin Concerto op. 35 (Warsaw Philharmonic Orchestra, Stanisław Wisłocki - conductor), 1969, Muza
- J. Brahms 2 Sonatas for piano and violin in A Major op. 100 and in d minor op. 108 (Maciej Paderewski - piano), 1970, Muza
- G. Bacewicz VII Violin Concerto (Warsaw Philharmonic Orchestra, Andrzej Markowski - conductor), 1969, Muza
- M. Ravel Piano Trio, G. Fauré Piano Trio (New Arts Trio), 1982, Pantheon
- L. van Beethoven Piano Trio in B-flat Major op. 97 ‘Archduke’ (New Arts Trio), 1983, Chamber Music Society of Rochester
- F. Kreisler, F. Grieg, H. Wieniawski and others, Rose in the snow – Short pieces for violin and piano (Wolfgang Plagge - piano), 1997, Norske Gram
- F. Busoni Sonatas for violin and piano (Franco Agostini - piano), 1998, Phoenix Classics
- A. Hovhaness, C. Saint-Saëns, M. Ravel and others Garden of Adonis – compositions for violin and harp (Małgorzata Milewska-Sundberg - harp), 2000, Porsgrunn Museum
- H. Wieniawski All works (Wolfgang Plagge – piano) – CD nr 1 (2000), CD nr 2 (2005), 2L Records (Aura)

== Sources ==
- Elżbieta Dziębowska, Musical encyclopedia – Encyklopedia muzyczna, vol. 4 ‘HIJ’, Kraków, Poland 1993, PWM.
- Theodore Strongin, Janowski is heard in a violin recital, 23 April 1971, The New York Times.
- Raymond Ericson, Music: Philharmonic. Bernstein Leads Works by Harris and Copland and Diamond Premiere, 3 April 1976, The New York Times.
- Joseph Horowitz, 3 Polish Musicians in Tribute, 20 May 1978, The New York Times.
- Harold C. Schonberg, Newport Opera to Do 3 Concerts a Day, 5 July 1978, The New York Times
- 2 Chamber Groups Win ’80 Naumburg Awards, 9 April 1980, The New York Times.
- Edward Rothstein, Concert: Chautauquans, 17 August 1982, The New York Times.
- John Rockwell, Concert: New Arts Trio at Alice Tully Hall, 23 March 1983, The New York Times.
- Piotr Janowski gives the most exhilarating, refreshing Wieniawski playing I have heard in a long time - I cannot wait for volume 2!, 1 April 2002, The Strad Magazine.
- Anne Midgette, Music Review: A Lithuanian Legend's Century-Old Quartet, or Most of It, 7 January 2003, The New York Times.
