= Bohdan Luts =

Ukrainian violinist (born 2004)

Bohdan Luts (born 28 November 2004) is a Ukrainian violinist.

== Biography ==
Bohdan Luts was born on 28 November 2004, in Lviv, Ukraine.

He studied at the Kyiv State Music Lyceum under Olga Korinets and at the Lviv State Music Lyceum under Maria Futorska, before continuing his education at the International Menuhin Music Academy in Switzerland with Oleg Kaskiv, Guillaume Chilemme, and Renaud Capuçon. He has participated in masterclasses with artists including Gábor Takács-Nagy and Pinchas Zukerman, and furthered his training at the University of Music and Performing Arts Vienna in the class of Boris Kuschnir.

== Awards ==
Bohdan Luts is a laureate of several international competitions. In 2022, at the age of 17, he won first prize at the Carl Nielsen International Music Competition, as well as first prize at the Alberto Lysy International Violin Competition in Gstaad. The following year, at age 18, he won first prize, the Press Prize, and the Audience Prize at the Long-Thibaud Competition.

In 2026, he won first prize at the Henryk Wieniawski International Violin Competition.

== Discography ==
- Bohdan Luts: Dvořák, Bruch, Nielsen; Odense Symphony Orchestra, conducted by Anna Skryleva; Orchid Classics, 2024.
