= Karl-Heinz Schütz =

Austrian flutist (born 1975)

- Born: September 26, 1975 (age 51); Innsbruck, Austria
- Genre: Classical
- Occupations: Musician, professor
- Instrument: Flute
- Member of: Vienna Philharmonic
- Website: karlheinzschuetz.com

Karl-Heinz Schütz is an Austrian classical flutist. He is the principal flutist of the Vienna Philharmonic.

== Career ==
Schütz was born in Innsbruck and grew up in Landeck, Tyrol. He studied under Eva Amsler, Aurèle Nicolet, and Philippe Bernold. He graduated from the Lyon Conservatory in 2000.

He joined the Vienna State Opera Orchestra in 2011 and moved on to the Vienna Philharmonic in 2015, which he joined as a principal flutist.

== Teaching ==
Schütz is a professor at the Music and Arts Private University of Vienna, gives regular international masterclasses, and teaches at the Vienna Philharmonic Orchestra Academy. He is routinely invited as a jury member at international competitions, and was the chair of the jury in the 2019 Carl Nielsen International Music Competition.

== Awards ==
Schütz won first prizes in the 1998 Carl Nielsen International Music Competition and the 1999 International Flute Competition in Kraków.
