= Milan Vítek =

Czech violinist (born 1938)

Milan Vítek (born 30 August 1938) is a Czech violinist, conductor and educator. He is the Professor of Violin at Oberlin Conservatory of Music.

== Early life and education ==
Milan Vítek was born on 30 August 1938 in Ostrava, Czechoslovakia. He received his diploma in 1959 from the Brno Conservatory, where he studied with Prof. Julius Remeš, a student of Otakar Ševčík. He continued his studies with Prof. Jaroslav Pekelský at the Academy of Performing Arts in Prague, where he graduated with a Soloist Performance Diploma cum laude in 1964. In 1961 he won a prize at the Thibaud Violin Competition in Paris, and later he won a prize in the Llangollen International Musical Eisteddfod in Wales, United Kingdom.

== Professional career ==
After completing his studies, Vítek was a founding member, concertmaster and soloist with the Prague Chamber Soloists conducted by Václav Neumann, member of the Czech Nonet, an official chamber ensemble of the Czech Philharmonic Orchestra, and the piano trio Pro Camera.

In 1968, he won a position in the Royal Danish Orchestra and moved to Copenhagen, Denmark. From 1969 to 1972, he played in the Royal Danish Orchestra as alternate concert master, founded Trio Pro Arte with the director of the Royal Danish Opera and later, the Sydney Opera, John Winther, as well as the Danish Chamber Orchestra. In 1970, he co-founded the Danish Chamber Orchestra.

In 1972, Vítek received an invitation to join the Czech String Quartet, resident at McMaster University in Hamilton, Ontario, where he also became a professor of violin. He also played as concert master in the Hamilton Symphony Orchestra.

In 1974, he returned to Denmark as professor of violin at the Royal Danish Academy of Music, a position which held until 2001. During his tenure there, he founded and conducted the Royal Danish Academy of Music Chamber Orchestra (1974), with which he toured to England, Scotland and Germany. He also co-founded the piano trio Trio Pro Arte, in which he played 1974-1999. With the trio he toured throughout Europe, Canada and the United States, and recorded the complete piano trios of Johannes Brahms, Bedřich Smetana's Piano Trio in G minor Op. 15 and Felix Mendelssohn-Bartholdy's second Piano Trio in C minor Op. 66 for the BIS label. In 1993, Vítek was also appointed visiting professor at the faculty of fine applied and performing arts at University of Gothenburg in Sweden.

In 2001, Vítek became professor of violin at the conservatory of music at Oberlin College, where he had previously been a guest professor in 1993–1994.

== Conducting ==
As a conductor, Milan Vítek has been artistic director of the Camerata Roman (now Camerata Nordica) in Sweden (1985–88) and the Danish Sinfonietta in Denmark (1989-?). He has also guest conducted the Royal Danish Opera Orchestra, the Odense Symphony Orchestra, the Czech Radio SO, the Janáček Philharmonic Orchestra in the Czech Republic, the Fribourg Festival SO in Switzerland and numerous other orchestras throughout Scandinavia.

== Teaching ==
He has adjudicated international violin competitions in Denmark – where he is chair of the Carl Nielsen International Music Competition – Germany, Japan, Estonia and Italy. His students are winners and laureates of among others the Carl Nielsen, J. Kocian, Heino Eller, Queen Elisabeth of Belgium, Washington International, Yehudi Menuhin International, the International Jean Sibelius Violin Competitions, and the Fischoff National Chamber Music Competition.

For his services to Danish cultural life, Vítek received the Knight's Cross of Dannebrog, 1st Class, in 1999.
