= Eva Hudečková =

Czech actress, playwright and writer

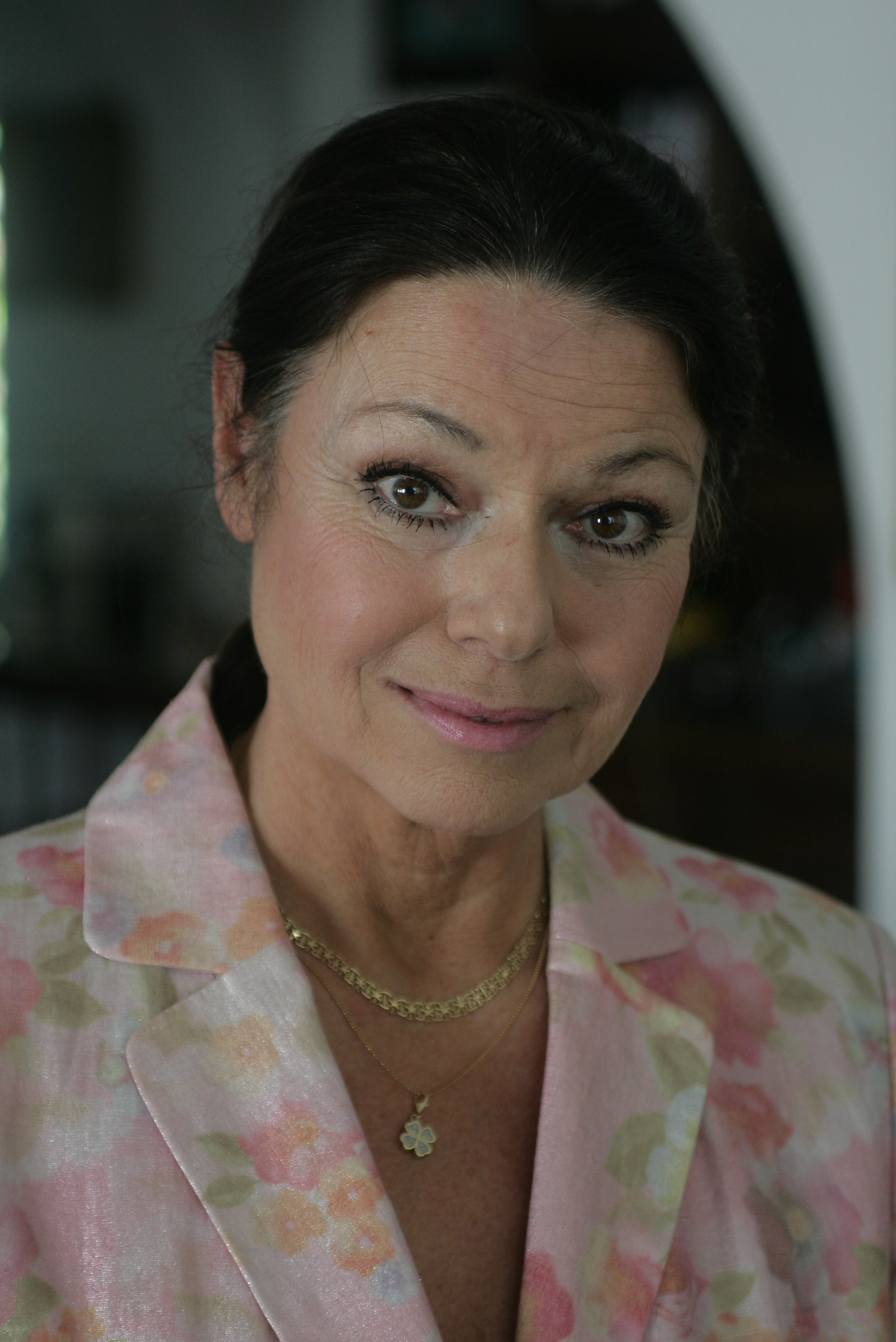
- Eva Hudečková (2008)
- Born: Eva Trejtnarová; 3 December 1949 (age 76); Prague, Czechoslovakia
- Occupations: Actress, playwright, writer
- Years active: 1965–present
- Spouse: Václav Hudeček

Signature
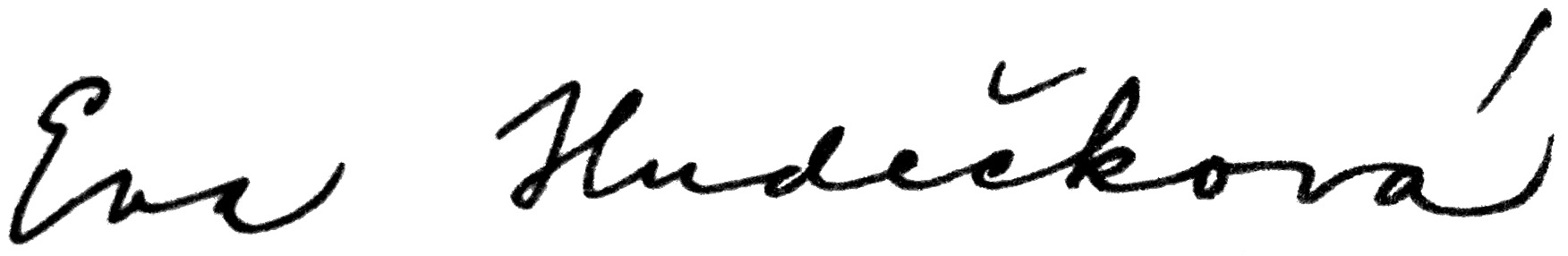

Eva Hudečková (born 3 December 1949 in Prague) is a Czech actress, playwright and writer.

She studied dramatic art at the Drama Faculty of the Academy of Performing Arts in Prague. She played many characters in the theatre and films and has won several awards. Since 1986 she has devoted herself to literature, she has written several film subjects, scripts and stories. Her film O ztracené lásce was screened by Czech television. Czech radio produced dramatisation of her book entitled Bratříček Golem (Little Brother Golem). Her husband is violinist Václav Hudeček.
