= Long-Thibaud-Crespin Competition =

Classical music competition

The Long–Thibaud–Crespin Competition is an international classical music competition for pianists, violinists and singers that has been held in France since 1943. (A Jacques Thibaud Competition was held the year before in Bordeaux: Jacques Thibaud chaired the jury and the First Prize was awarded to Jacques Dejean.) It was created by the pianist Marguerite Long and the violinist Jacques Thibaud. Thibaud died in 1953, Long in 1966. Until 2011 it included only pianists and violinists and was known as the Marguerite Long–Jacques Thibaud Competition. That year, in honour of the French soprano Régine Crespin (1927–2007), it was expanded to include singers, and renamed.

== Frequency ==
The competition was initially triennial, but from 1949 it was held biennially. In 1980, it was split into two contests, where pianists compete only against other pianists, and violinists only against other violinists. Previously, violinists and pianists had competed against each other. That year, it reverted to a triennial competition. In 2007, it became biennial once more, and in 2011, under its new name, it became triennial again.

== Juries ==
Yehudi Menuhin headed the violin jury from 1993 till his death in 1999. The president of the violin jury is currently Salvatore Accardo. Aldo Ciccolini headed the piano jury in 2007.

== Winners ==
The winners in the inaugural contest (1943) were Samson François (piano) and Michèle Auclair (violin).

Other notable prize winners include: Paul Badura-Skoda, Kristóf Baráti, Dmitri Bashkirov, Anshel Brusilow, Joaquin Achucarro, Alexandre Brussilovsky, Stanislav Bunin (1983), Olivier Cazal, Jean-Philippe Collard, Youri Egorov, Arnold Eidus, Brigitte Engerer, Philippe Entremont, Aldo Ciccolini, Victor Eresko, Devy Erlih (1955, violin), Verda Erman (1963), Vladimir Feltsman, Christian Ferras, Peter Frankl, Nana Jashvili (1967, Premier Grand Prix; Prix Spécial for Ravel's Tzigane), Sergey Kravchenko, Marina Goglidze-Mdivani, Lydia Mordkovitch (1969), Jean-Frédéric Neuburger, György Pauk, Jorge Luis Prats (1976), Nelli Shkolnikova, Raphael Sobolevsky, Vladimir Spivakov, Gabriel Tacchino, Jean Ter-Merguerian, Cédric Tiberghien, Julian Trevelyan, Tamás Vásáry, Vladimir Viardo, Jean-Pierre Wallez, Oxana Yablonskaya, Diana Tishchenko (2018), Kenji Miura (2019), Masaya Kamei and Hyuk Lee (2022), and Bohdan Luts (2023).
