= Jiří Vodička =

Czech violinist

Jiří Vodička (born 1988) is a Czech violinist. He has performed with many of the leading Czech orchestras including the Janacek Philharmonic Orchestra in Ostrava in May 2007. He has received national awards for his musicianship. He was awarded First Prize in the following national and international competitions: Czech Nationwide Competition for Primary Artistic Schools, the Kocian International Violin Competition, Prague Junior Note, Violin Competition (Dolny Kubin), the Beethoven International Violin Competition in Hradec nad Moravici, and the 2004 4th International Louis Spohr Competition for Young Violinists in Weimar, Germany.

He began playing violin at the age of six and studied under Zdenek Gola at the Institute of Arts, in Ostrava University. He has also performed with the Martinu Philharmonic Orchestra and Slovak Chamber Orchestra under Bohdan Warchal. He has performed internationally in Poland, Germany, Sweden, Slovakia, Austria, Spain, Japan and China.

He has performed a wide range of classical music from composers such as Mozart, Mendelssohn, Paganini, Lalo, Wieniawski, Dvorak, Sibelius and many more.
