= Agata Szymczewska =

Polish women violinist

Agata Szymczewska (born 1985 in Gdańsk) is a Polish violinist and alumna of the Academy of Music in Poznań and the Hochschule für Musik, Theater und Medien Hannover, where she studied under professors Bartosz Bryła and Krzysztof Węgrzyn, respectively. In 2006 she won the 13th Henryk Wieniawski Violin Competition in Poznań.

She has also won awards in violin competitions in Canada, Germany, Austria, and Poland.
