= Konstanty Andrzej Kulka =

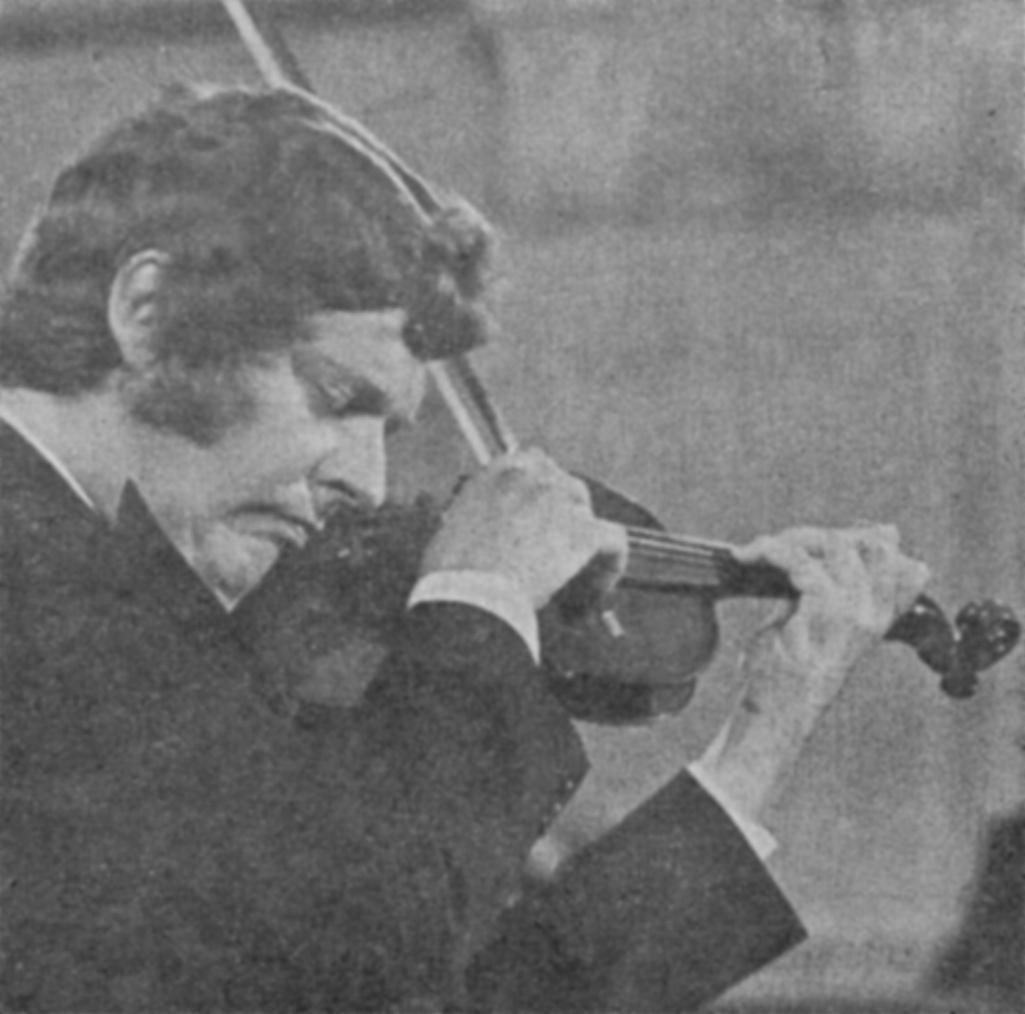
- CD cover. Music of Karol Józef Lipiński performed by the violinist with string ensemble, released in 2013

Background information
- Born: 5 March 1947 (age 78); Gdańsk
- Genres: Classical music
- Instrument: Violin

Konstanty Andrzej Kulka (born 5 March 1947) is a Polish violinist, recording artist, and professor of the Fryderyk Chopin University of Music in Warsaw since 1994, also heading the Institute of String Instruments there. Kulka graduated with honors from the Stanisław Moniuszko Academy of Music in Gdańsk in 1971. He played over 1,500 recitals internationally, including in the United States, Japan, and Australia. Kulka is a guest performer with the Berliner Philharmoniker, Chicago Symphony Orchestra, London Symphony Orchestra, English Chamber Orchestra, Royal Concertgebouw Orchestra in Amsterdam, Minneapolis Symphony Orchestra, and Saint Petersburg Philharmonic Orchestra. He took part in leading music festivals including in Lucerne, Bordeaux, Flandria, Berlin, Prague, Barcelona, Brighton, and Warsaw.

== Life ==
Kulka was born in Gdańsk where he began his music education at the age of eight. He enrolled at the state music lyceum there. His international recognition began in 1964 at the German ARD International Music Competition in Munich where Kulka won first prize. Kulka is a professor at the Fryderyk Chopin University of Music in Warsaw. His daughter is singer-songwriter Gaba Kulka.
