= List of contemporary classical violinists =

This is a list of notable contemporary classical violinists.

For the names of notable violinists of all classical music eras see List of classical violinists.

== Classical violinists ==
=== A ===
- Irene Abrigo (born 1988)
- Salvatore Accardo (born 1941)
- Diana Adamyan (born 2000)
- Ayke Agus (born 1949)
- Ruben Aharonyan (born 1947)
- Sanford Allen (born 1939)
- Levon Ambartsumian (born 1955)
- Pierre Amoyal (born 1949)
- Adrian Anantawan (born 1983)
- Armen Anassian
- Božena Angelova (born 1981)
- Adele Anthony (born 1970)
- Gilles Apap (born 1963)
- Irvine Arditti (born 1953)
- Cecylia Arzewski (born 1948)
- Shmuel Ashkenasi (born 1941)
- Christina Åstrand (born 1969)
- Kinga Augustyn
- Daniel Austrich (born 1984)

=== B ===
- Alena Baeva (born 1985)
- Jenny Oaks Baker (born 1975)
- Kristine Balanas (born 1990)
- Volodja Balžalorsky (born 1956)
- Kristóf Baráti (born 1979)
- William Barbini (born 1947)
- Lisa Batiashvili (born 1979)
- Elise Båtnes (born 1971)
- Martin Beaver (born 1967)
- Tanja Becker-Bender (born 1978)
- Corina Belcea (born 1975)
- Boris Belkin (born 1948)
- Joshua Bell (born 1967)
- Noah Bendix-Balgley (born 1984)
- Nicola Benedetti (born 1987)
- Dmitri Berlinsky (born 1968)
- Pavel Berman (born 1970)
- Andrew Bernardi (born 1965)
- Oleg Bezuglov (born 1984)
- Mikhail Bezverkhny (born 1947)
- Ida Bieler (born 1950)
- Lea Birringer (born 1986)
- Marat Bisengaliev (born 1962)
- Sedra Bistodeau (born 1994)
- Kolja Blacher (born 1963)
- Dejan Bogdanović
- Nikita Boriso-Glebsky (born 1985)
- Benjamin Bowman (born 1979)
- Christina Brabetz (born 1993)
- Guy Braunstein (born 1971)
- Linda Brava (born 1970)
- Vadim Brodski (born 1950)
- Zakhar Bron (born 1947)
- Bui Cong Duy (born 1981)
- Oliver Butterworth

=== C ===
- Caroline Campbell (born 1979)
- Robert Canetti (born 1948)
- Stuart Canin (born 1926)
- Marie Cantagrill (born 1979)
- Renaud Capuçon (born 1976)
- Andrés Cárdenes (born 1957)
- Giuliano Carmignola (born 1951)
- Jonathan Carney (born 1963)
- Zachary Carrettin (born 1972)
- Charles Castleman (born 1941)
- David Cerone (born 1941)
- Corey Cerovsek (born 1972)
- David Chan (born 1973)
- Lynn Chang (born 1953)
- Sarah Chang (born 1980)
- Olivier Charlier (born 1961)
- Stephanie Chase (born 1957)
- Anastasia Chebotareva (born 1972)
- Eddy Chen (born 1993)
- Jiafeng Chen (born 1987)
- Ray Chen (born 1989)
- Robert Chen (born 1969)
- Stella Chen (born 1992)
- Stephanie Childress (born 1999)
- Jennifer Choi (born 1974)
- Nikki Chooi (born 1989)
- Timothy Chooi (born 1993)
- Chloe Chua (born 2007)
- Ana Chumachenco (born 1945)
- Kyung-wha Chung (born 1948)
- Fanny Clamagirand (born 1984)
- Jonathan Crow (born 1977)
- Jeremy Cushman (born 1990)

=== D ===
- Alexandre Da Costa
- John Dalley (born 1935)
- Carlos Damas (born 1973)
- Robert Davidovici (born 1946)
- Beverley Davison
- Brett Deubner (born 1968)
- Lindsay Deutsch (born 1984)
- Alma Deutscher (born 2005)
- Glenn Dicterow (born 1948)
- Philippe Djokic (born 1950)
- Sergei Dogadin (born 1988)
- Angèle Dubeau (born 1962)
- María Dueñas (born 2002)
- Augustin Dumay (born 1949)
- Aaron Dworkin (born 1970)

=== E ===
- Veronika Eberle (born 1988)
- James Ehnes (born 1976)
- Hawijch Elders (born 1998)
- Joshua Epstein (born 1940)
- Vesko Eschkenazy (born 1970)
- Ralph Evans (born 1953)

=== F ===
- Ralph Farris (born 1970)
- Isabelle Faust (born 1972)
- Maxim Fedotov (born 1961)
- Liza Ferschtman (born 1979)
- Julia Fischer (born 1983)
- Annar Follesø (born 1972)
- Patrice Fontanarosa (born 1942)
- Cyrus Forough (born 1972)
- Fayiz Muhammed (born 1997)
- Vilde Frang (born 1986)
- Pamela Frank (born 1967)
- Jennifer Frautschi (born 1973)
- Miriam Fried (born 1946)
- Rodney Friend (born 1939)
- David Frühwirth (born 1974)

=== G ===
- Taras Gabora (born 1932)
- Alexis Galpérine (born 1955)
- Xiang Gao
- Ilian Gârnet (born 1983)
- David Garrett (born 1980)
- Saschko Gawriloff (born 1929)
- Sylvie Gazeau (born 1950)
- Joseph Genualdi (born 1954)
- Alexander Gilman (born 1982)
- Jack Glatzer (born 1939)
- Vadim Gluzman (born 1973)
- Ioana Cristina Goicea (born 1992)
- Malcolm Goldstein (born 1936)
- Gottfried von der Goltz (born 1964)
- Karen Gomyo (born 1982)
- Randall Goosby (born 1996)
- Midori Gotō (born 1971)
- Ryu Goto (born 1988)
- Clio Gould (born 1968)
- Philippe Graffin (born 1964)
- Endre Granat (born 1937)
- Salvatore Greco (born 1964)
- David Grimal (born 1973)
- Tatiana Grindenko (born 1946)
- Ilya Gringolts (born 1982)
- Ilya Grubert (born 1954)
- Igor Gruppman (born 1956)
- Roberta Guaspari (born 1947)
- Vijay Gupta (born 1987)

=== H ===
- Augustin Hadelich (born 1984)
- William Hagen
- Viviane Hagner (born 1977)
- Hilary Hahn (born 1979)
- Kelly Hall-Tompkins
- Ben Hancox
- Chloë Hanslip (born 1987)
- Edward W. Hardy (born 1992)
- Maurice Hasson (born 1934)
- Joji Hattori (born 1969)
- Moné Hattori (born 1999)
- Andrew Haveron (born 1975)
- Ziyu He (born 1999)
- Daniel Heifetz (born 1948)
- Eldbjørg Hemsing (born 1990)
- Ragnhild Hemsing (born 1988)
- Peter Herresthal (born 1970)
- Feargus Hetherington (born 1979)
- Ulf Hoelscher (born 1942)
- Philippe Honoré (born 1967)
- Daniel Hope (born 1974)
- Bella Hristova (born 1985)
- Hu Kun (born 1963)
- Hu Nai-yuan (born 1961)
- Frank Huang (born 1978)
- Sirena Huang (born 1994)
- Václav Hudeček (born 1952)
- Fenella Humphreys

=== I ===
- Alina Ibragimova (born 1985)
- Aleksey Igudesman (born 1973)
- Petteri Iivonen (born 1987)
- Judith Ingolfsson (born 1973)
- Solomiya Ivakhiv (born 1980)
- Ray Iwazumi (born 1976)
- Benjamin Izmajlov (born 1974)

=== J ===
- Stefan Jackiw (born 1985)
- Ignace Jang (born 1969)
- Janine Jansen (born 1978)
- Nana Jashvili
- Dylana Jenson (born 1961)
- Leila Josefowicz (born 1977)
- Chantal Juillet (born 1960)

=== K ===
- Ilya Kaler (born 1963)
- Kam Ning (born 1975)
- Mayuko Kamio (born 1986)
- Koh Gabriel Kameda (born 1975)
- Mayuko Kamio (born 1986)
- Clara-Jumi Kang (born 1987)
- Dong-Suk Kang (born 1954)
- Judy Kang (born 1979)
- Juliette Kang (born 1975)
- Suyeon Kang (born 1989)
- Paul Kantor (born 1955)
- Jean-Jacques Kantorow (born 1945)
- Lewis Kaplan (born 1933)
- Mark Kaplan (born 1953)
- Dalibor Karvay (born 1985)
- Daishin Kashimoto (born 1979)
- Ani Kavafian (born 1948)
- Ida Kavafian (born 1952)
- Leonidas Kavakos (born 1967)
- Tamaki Kawakubo (born 1979)
- Yōsuke Kawasaki (born 1977)
- Gaik Kazazian (born 1982)
- Barnabás Kelemen (born 1978)
- András Keller (born 1960)
- Nigel Kennedy (born 1956)
- Alexander Kerr (born 1970)
- Isabelle van Keulen (born 1966)
- Sergey Khachatryan (born 1985)
- Nadir Khashimov (born 1990)
- Anastasia Khitruk (born 1974)
- Olga Kholodnaya (born 1987)
- Benny Kim (born 1962)
- Bomsori Kim (born 1989)
- Kim Chee-yun (born 1970)
- Chin Kim (born 1957)
- David Kim (born 1963)
- Dennis Kim (born 1975)
- Fabiola Kim (born 1991)
- Kim Kyung-Jun (born 1987)
- Roman Kim (born 1991)
- Soovin Kim (born 1976)
- Mari Kimura (born 1962)
- Mayu Kishima (born 1986)
- Nicolas Koeckert (born 1979)
- Rudolf Koelman (born 1959)
- Pavel Kogan (born 1952)
- Jennifer Koh (born 1976)
- Katalin Kokas (born 1978)
- Rachel Kolly (born 1981)
- Christoph Koncz (born 1987)
- Patricia Kopatchinskaja (born 1977)
- Mikhail Kopelman (born 1947)
- Laurent Korcia (born 1964)
- Henning Kraggerud (born 1973)
- Anna Katharina Kränzlein (born 1980)
- Julia Krasko (born 1971)
- Gidon Kremer (born 1948)
- Emmanuel Krivine (born 1947)
- Sergei Krylov (born 1970)
- Oleh Krysa (born 1942)
- Erzhan Kulibaev (born 1986)
- Konstanty Andrzej Kulka (born 1947)
- Boris Kuschnir (born 1948)
- Yevgeny Kutik (born 1985)
- Pekka Kuusisto (born 1976)

=== L ===
- Roby Lakatos (born 1965)
- Vladimir Landsman (born 1941)
- Théotime Langlois de Swarte (born 1995)
- Jaime Laredo (born 1941)
- Tessa Lark (born 1989)
- Kevin Lawrence (born 1957)
- Anna Lee (born 1995)
- Christel Lee (born 1990)
- Shannon Lee (born 1992)
- Jozsef Lendvay (born 1974)
- Kerson Leong (born 1997)
- Luz Leskowitz (born 1943)
- Gabrielle Lester (born 1961)
- Christian Li (born 2007)
- Li Chuan Yun (born 1980)
- Jack Liebeck (born 1980)
- Lim Ji-young (born 1995)
- Cho-liang Lin (born 1960)
- Joseph Lin (born 1978)
- Richard Lin (born 1991)
- Jessica Linnebach (born 1983)
- Robert Lipsett (born 1947)
- Tasmin Little (born 1965)
- Yang Liu (born 1976)
- Daniel Lozakovich (born 2001)
- Lü Siqing (born 1969)
- Barbara Luisi
- Cora Venus Lunny (born 1981)

=== M ===
- Cristian Măcelaru (born 1980)
- Nikolay Madoyan (born 1973)
- Manoj George (born 1971)
- Igor Malinovsky (born 1977)
- Sergey Malov (born 1983)
- Antonello Manacorda (born 1970)
- Catherine Manoukian (born 1981)
- Catya Maré (violinist, songwriter and music producer)
- Yannos Margaziotis (born 1967)
- Albert Markov (born 1933)
- Alexander Markov (born 1963)
- Edvin Marton (born 1974)
- Anthony Marwood (born 1965)
- Gwendolyn Masin (born 1977)
- Bohuslav Matoušek (born 1949)
- Robert McDuffie (born 1958)
- Anne Akiko Meyers (born 1970)
- Franco Mezzena (born 1953)
- Lucia Micarelli (born 1983)
- Peter Michalica (born 1945)
- Vanya Milanova (born 1954)
- Stefan Milenković (born 1977)
- Shlomo Mintz (born 1957)
- Madeleine Mitchell
- Jessie Montgomery (born 1981)
- Leticia Moreno (born 1985)
- Amy Schwartz Moretti (born 1975)
- Darragh Morgan (born 1974)
- Gil Morgenstern
- Bijan Mortazavi (born 1957)
- Viktoria Mullova (born 1959)
- Tai Murray (born 1982)
- Andres Mustonen (born 1953)
- Anne-Sophie Mutter (born 1963)

=== N ===
- Stephen Nachmanovitch (born 1950)
- Soon Hee Newbold (born 1974)
- Florin Niculescu (born 1967)
- Gordan Nikolitch (born 1968)
- Ning Feng (born 1982)
- Ayano Ninomiya (born 1979)
- Takako Nishizaki (born 1944)
- Bartłomiej Nizioł (born 1974)
- Domenico Nordio (born 1971)

=== O ===
- Sarah Oates (born 1976)
- Elmar Oliveira (born 1950)
- Peter Oundjian (born 1955)

=== P ===
- Ji-hae Park (born 1985)
- Mi-Young Park (born 1948)
- Régis Pasquier (born 1945)
- Mariusz Patyra (born 1977)
- Adela Peña
- Itzhak Perlman (born 1945)
- Mark Peskanov (born 1958)
- Ioana Petcu-Colan (born 1978)
- Anastasiya Petryshak (born 1994)
- Igor Pikayzen (born 1987)
- Jennifer Pike (born 1989)
- Rachel Barton Pine (born 1974)
- Elizabeth Pitcairn (born 1973)
- Ivan Pochekin (born 1987)
- Alina Pogostkina (born 1983)
- Kermit Poling (born 1960)
- Christoph Poppen (born 1956)
- Gérard Poulet (born 1938)
- Blake Pouliot (born 1994)
- William Preucil (born 1958)
- Rachel Lee Priday (born 1988)
- Liviu Prunaru (born 1969)
- Edward Pulgar (born 1974)

=== Q ===
- Philippe Quint (born 1974)

=== R ===
- Julian Rachlin (born 1974)
- Nemanja Radulović (born 1985)
- Itzhak Rashkovsky (born 1955)
- Henry Raudales
- Kenneth Renshaw (born 1993)
- Vadim Repin (born 1971)
- Yury Revich (born 1991)
- Gerardo Ribeiro (born 1950)
- Nicolaus Richter de Vroe (born 1955)
- André Rieu (born 1949)
- Guido Rimonda (born 1969)
- Shahrdad Rohani (born 1954)
- Svetlin Roussev
- Mary Rowell
- Yaakov Rubinstein (born 1968)
- Desirée Ruhstrat

=== S ===
- Jorge Saade (born 1964)
- Kaija Saarikettu (born 1957)
- Nikolai Sachenko (born 1977)
- Dilshad Said (born 1958)
- Lara St. John (born 1971)
- Scott St. John (born 1969)
- Julia Sakharova (born 1979)
- Nadja Salerno-Sonnenberg (born 1961)
- Stephanie Sant'Ambrogio (born 1960)
- Guido Sant'Anna (born 2005)
- Shunske Sato (born 1984)
- Giora Schmidt (born 1983)
- Rainer Schmidt (born 1964)
- Eduard Schmieder (born 1948)
- Ani Schnarch (born 1957)
- Gerhard Schulz (born 1951)
- Lynnette Seah (born 1957)
- Ilja Sekler (born 1971)
- Aleksey Semenenko (born 1988)
- Asuka Sezaki (born 1977)
- Gil Shaham (born 1971)
- Hagai Shaham (born 1966)
- Lisa Shihoten (born 1976)
- Hyun Su Shin (born 1987)
- Sayaka Shoji (born 1983)
- Charlie Siem (born 1986)
- Tracy Silverman (born 1960)
- Siow Lee Chin (born 1966)
- Alexander Sitkovetsky (born 1983)
- Dmitry Sitkovetsky (born 1954)
- Baiba Skride (born 1981)
- Alicja Smietana (born 1983)
- Valeriy Sokolov (born 1986)
- Sue Son (born 1985)
- Josef Špaček (born 1986)
- Vladimir Spivakov (born 1944)
- Daniel Stabrawa (born 1955)
- Judith Stapf (born 1997)
- Steven Staryk (born 1932)
- Anton Steck (born 1965)
- Vesna Stefanovich-Gruppman
- Arabella Steinbacher (born 1981)
- Arnold Steinhardt (born 1937)
- Curtis Stewart
- John Storgårds (born 1963)
- Axel Strauss (born 1974)
- Marius Stravinsky (born 1979)
- Paula Šūmane (born 1989)
- Janet Sung
- Sébastien Surel (born 1975)
- Gernot Süßmuth (born 1963)
- Akiko Suwanai (born 1972)
- Airi Suzuki (born 1989)
- Martynas Švėgžda von Bekker (born 1967)
- Evgeny Sviridov (born 1989)
- Vilmos Szabadi (born 1959)
- Antal Szalai (born 1981)
- Géza Szilvay (born 1943)
- Réka Szilvay (born 1972)
- Agata Szymczewska (born 1985)

=== T ===
- Kyoko Takezawa (born 1966)
- Ilkka Talvi (born 1948)
- Peter Tanfield (born 1961)
- Marcus Tanneberger (born 1987)
- Veriko Tchumburidze (born 1996)
- Arve Tellefsen (born 1936)
- Ryo Terakado (born 1961)
- Christian Tetzlaff (born 1966)
- Gwen Thompson (born 1947)
- Olivier Thouin
- Hugo Ticciati (born 1980)
- Anna Tifu (born 1986)
- Diana Tishchenko (born 1990)
- Emmanuel Tjeknavorian (born 1995)
- Richard Tognetti (born 1965)
- Alexandru Tomescu (born 1976)
- Viktor Tretiakov (born 1946)
- Lana Trotovšek (born 1983)
- Kirill Troussov (born 1982)
- Yu-Chien Tseng (born 1994)
- Vera Tsu Weiling (born 1960)

=== U ===
- Dmytro Udovychenko (born 1990)
- Uto Ughi (born 1944)
- Jourdan Urbach (born 1991)

=== V ===
- Elina Vähälä (born 1975)
- Almita Vamos (born 1938)
- Roland Vamos (born 1930)
- Vanessa-Mae (born 1978)
- Satu Vänskä (born 1979)
- Vasko Vassilev (born 1970)
- Maxim Vengerov (born 1974)
- Emmy Verhey (born 1949)
- Pavel Vernikov (born 1953)
- Zino Vinnikov (born 1943)
- Milan Vitek (born 1938)

=== W ===
- Stephen Waarts (born 1996)
- Gregory T.S. Walker (born 1961)
- Jean-Pierre Wallez (born 1939)
- Donald Weilerstein (born 1940)
- Vera Tsu Weiling (born 1960)
- Antje Weithaas (born 1966)
- Rudolf Werthen (born 1946)
- Carolin Widmann (born 1976)
- Noa Wildschut (born 2001)
- Ross Monroe Winter (born 1981)
- Jasper Wood (born 1974)
- Bartosz Woroch (born 1984)
- Christine Wu

=== Y ===
- Brett Yang (born 1992)
- Charles Yang (born 1988)
- In Mo Yang (born 1995)
- Tianwa Yang (born 1987)
- Yuval Yaron (born 1953)
- Esther Yoo (born 1994)
- Scott Yoo (born 1971)
- Soyoung Yoon (born 1984)
- Diana Yukawa (born 1985)

=== Z ===
- Antal Zalai (born 1981)
- Thomas Zehetmair (born 1961)
- Ivan Ženatý (born 1962)
- Simone Zgraggen (born 1975)
- Jay Zhong (born 1973)
- Nancy Zhou (born 1993)
- Kevin Zhu (born 2000)
- Leia Zhu (born 2006)
- Frank Peter Zimmermann (born 1965)
- Yossi Zivoni
- Nikolaj Znaider (born 1975)
- Itamar Zorman (born 1985)
- Pinchas Zukerman (born 1948)
- Jaap van Zweden (born 1960)

== Baroque violinists ==
- Chiara Banchini (born 1946) (also conducts)
- Fabio Biondi (born 1961) (also conducts)
- Alison Bury (born 1954)
- Giuliano Carmignola (born 1951)
- Lucy van Dael (born 1946)
- Isabelle Faust (born 1972) (performs principally on the modern violin)
- Enrico Gatti (born 1955)
- Reinhard Goebel (born 1952) (also conducts)
- Gottfried von der Goltz (born 1964) (also conducts)
- Ilya Gringolts (born 1982) (performs principally on the modern violin)
- Thomas Hengelbrock (born 1958) (primarily known for conducting)
- John Holloway (born 1948)
- Monica Huggett (born 1953) (also conducts)
- Alina Ibragimova (performs principally on the modern violin)
- Sigiswald Kuijken (born 1944) (also conducts)
- Andrew Manze (born 1965) (also conducts)
- Eduard Melkus (born 1928)
- Sonya Monosoff (born 1927)
- Viktoria Mullova (born 1959) (performs principally on the modern violin)
- Petra Müllejans (born 1959)
- Enrico Onofri (born 1967) (first violinist with Il Giardino Armonico)
- Ioana Petcu-Colan (born 1978)
- Rachel Barton Pine (born 1974) (performs principally on the modern violin, also plays viola d'amore)
- Rachel Podger (born 1968)
- Hélène Schmitt
- Dmitry Sinkovsky (born 1980) (also countertenor and conductor)
- Simon Standage (born 1941)
- Elizabeth Wallfisch (born 1952) (also conducts)
