= Fjodor Elesin =

Russian musician

Fjodor Elesin (born January 4, 1983, Leningrad) is a Russian cellist, Artistic Director of SchlossAkademie, creator of a musical platform, artistic director, and producer of various international musical and digital projects, currently based in Germany.

== Biography ==
Fjodor Elesin was born in Leningrad in 1983. He started taking music lessons at the age of 4. His musical abilities had been noticed by the famous Soviet musician Mstislav Rostropovich who had been looking after and supporting Elesin for many years afterward.

Elesin graduated from the Rimsky-Korsakov College of Music in cello class. Among Elesin's teachers, there were V. Atapin, a cellist of the Saint Petersburg Philharmonic, A. Ponomarenko, a cellist of the Mariinsky Theatre Orchestra, and A. Vasilyev, the rector of the Saint Petersburg State Conservatory.

Having graduated from the Secondary Special Music School of the St. Petersburg State Conservatory, Elesin started his concert activity and performed with solo programs in various halls, being a cello soloist of the Saint-Petersburg Radio and TV Orchestra.

Elesin continued his education, having entered the High School of Theatre and Music in Hamburg (Professor Wolfgang Mehlhorn's class), which he graduated from in 2009.

Having received a scholarship awarded by Spanish Fund of Queen Sofia (Fundación Reina Sofía) to talented musicians, Elesin was able to study at the International Institute of Chamber Music (Instituto Internacional de Música de Cámer), where he was taught by Ralf Gothóni, Bruno Canino, and Menahem Pressler.

Elesin actively tours with solo performances at Carnegie Hall (New York), the Berlin Philharmonic, St Martin-in-the-Fields (London), the Saint-Petersburg State Philharmonic, and other world-renowned halls.

Together with the pianist Alina Kabanova, Elesin formed the "Beethoven-Duo", with which he also actively performed.

Besides his career as a musician, Elesin began to organize music events himself. Since 2013, Elesin has been organizing cycles of concerts and music festivals.

He became the artistic director of such festivals as "Arabesques in Russia" and others.

Among the events where Elesin acted as a producer and artistic director, one can mention the Caspian Festival of Classical Music "OperaFirst. Astrakhan 2021".

== Projects ==
Fjodor Elesin is the creator and producer of various music, digital, and educational projects.

In January 2018, he became the artistic director of the German music academy SchlossAkademie, which educates young musicians and has several branch offices worldwide. More than 200 internationally renowned teachers teach at the academy.

March 2020, during the Covid-19 pandemic, Elesin created an online musical platform. The platform aimed to make classical music concerts available to audiences online in the face of the pandemic. The streaming service then began to evolve into a concert agency as well as a social and educational network for musicians.

The project was supported by institutions as the Hermitage Museum, the State Historical Museum, WDR, Universal Edition, and others.

The first big international project of the platform was the BEE250VEN festival, which took place online from August 1 to 30, 2020, and presented over 40 concerts performed by more than 250 musicians to listeners from all over the world.

The event featured Mikhail Golikov's Digital Orchestra, violinist Patricia Kopachinskaya, violinist Daishin Kashimoto, pianist Nikolai Lugansky, the Italian chamber ensemble "Quartetto di Cremona", soloists from the Metropolitan Opera, and other performers from the USA, Europe, and Asia.

The next significant event of the platform was the "Music Bridge" project held together with the Goethe Institute as part of the Russian–German Year of Scientific and Educational Partnerships. The "Music Bridge" gave music students, as well as classical music lovers, the opportunity to get acquainted with the German system of higher music education and initiate an international exchange of experience.

In 2020, the platform also announced the international WorldVision Music Contest, which aimed to save the next generation of young musicians for the global music community and help young talents. As part of this festival, a partnership with The Violin Channel, one of the largest media outlets for classical music, took place.

"We created a program that allows musicians to enter the competition from the comfort of their own homes, which has been designed to help them in all stages of creating and recording their work. We've also put together the largest prize fund we think the competition has ever offered. Scholarships to create successful work are available at all stages of the competition so that no talent will go unnoticed," comments Elesin.

In 2021 Elesin became the president and curator of the Caspian Festival of Classical Music "OperaFirst. Astrakhan 2021". The Caspian Symphony Orchestra, created by Elesin himself and his Cultural Foundation "Music Entertainment", made its debut at the festival.

== Awards ==
Over the years, Elesin has won 24 prizes and awards at various international music competitions.

These include the Deutsche Stiftung Musikleben Prize, the IBLA GRAND PRIZE, the Prokofyev Award, and others.

Having received worldwide acclamation and won these awards, Fjodor Elesin, in turn, has become the one who evaluates the work of musicians and awards them himself. For example, in 2018 at the First Viktor Tretyakov International Violin Competition (Krasnoyarsk), special prizes were awarded by Yuri Bashmet, Valery Gergiev, and other musicians, including Fjodor Elesin.

== Interesting Facts ==
- As head of the Arabesques festival ("Arabesques on the Alexander III Bridge"), he brought to Russia a prominent German politician, Olaf Scholz, who subsequently offered him German citizenship.
- In 2016, he played the cello of Nikolai II (1898), for which he became known in international music circles and the press as "The Tsar of the Cello."
- Also, as a holder of the Deutsche Stiftung Musikleben scholarship, he played on a French instrument made by a master named Gand.
