= London Mozart Players =

Chamber orchestra in London, England

- Chamber orchestra
- Founded: 1949; 77 years ago
- Concert hall: Fairfield Halls, Croydon
- Website: www.lmp.org

The London Mozart Players (LMP) are a British chamber orchestra founded in 1949. LMP are the longest-established chamber orchestra in the United Kingdom. Since 1989, the orchestra has been Resident Orchestra at Fairfield Halls, Croydon.

== History ==
=== Beginnings ===
The violinist Harry Blech formed the orchestra in 1949. Having just branched out into conducting, Blech was approached by pianist Dorothea Braus to arrange and conduct an all-Mozart concert at Wigmore Hall. Blech continued to arrange and perform increasingly successful concerts with the London Mozart Players, which led to regular broadcasts by the BBC. The orchestra performed in the opening week's events at the Royal Festival Hall in 1951 and became regulars there and later at the Queen Elizabeth Hall.

=== Later history and present day ===
Musicians associated with the orchestra include James Galway, Felicity Lott, Jane Glover, Howard Shelley, John Suchet and Simon Callow. Nicola Benedetti, Jacqueline du Pré and Jan Pascal Tortelier played early in their careers with the orchestra. At present, it welcomes soloists such as Sheku Kanneh-Mason, Jess Gillam and Anna Lapwood. Young Artists-in-Residence have included Leia Zhu. It tours Europe and the Far East, and records for Naxos, Chandos and Hyperion Records.

In London, the orchestra performs in venues including the Royal Festival Hall, St Martin-in-the-Fields, St John's Smith Square and Cadogan Hall, as well as in cathedrals and other concert venues across the UK. LMP are the resident orchestra at Croydon's Fairfield Halls. In 2016, it temporarily relocated its offices to St John the Evangelist, Upper Norwood. Prince Edward, Duke of Edinburgh has been patron of the dorchestra since 1988.

Jonathan Bloxham became conductor-in-residence and artistic advisor of the orchestra as of the 2022–2023 season. Bloxham became principal conductor of the LMP as of the 2025–2026 season.

Past chief executives of the LMP have included Flynn Le Brocq. In October 2025, the LMP announced the appointment of Chrissy Kinsella as its next chief executive, effective 1 January 2026.

== Principal conductors ==
- Harry Blech (1949–1984)
- Jane Glover (1984–1992)
- Matthias Bamert (1992–2000)
- Andrew Parrott (2000–2006)
- Gérard Korsten (2010–2014)
- Jonathan Bloxham (2025–present)

=== Other titled conductors ===
- Howard Shelley (conductor laureate, 2015–present)

== Contemporaries of Mozart series ==
In 1993, the London Mozart Players began a series of recordings for Chandos Records of works by lesser-known eighteenth-century composers, entitled the Contemporaries of Mozart series. Many of these recordings have drawn widespread critical acclaim and have been credited with bringing these lesser-heard composers to the public light. A number of releases have also been awarded Editor's Choice in Gramophone magazine. The series includes works by:

- Carlos Baguer
- Christian Cannabich
- Muzio Clementi
- François-Joseph Gossec
- Adalbert Gyrowetz
- Michael Haydn
- William Herschel
- Franz Anton Hoffmeister
- Leopold Kozeluch
- Franz Krommer
- John Marsh
- Leopold Mozart
- Josef Mysliveček
- Václav Pichl
- Ignace Joseph Pleyel
- Franz Xaver Richter
- Antonio Rosetti
- Antonio Salieri
- Carl Stamitz
- Georg Joseph Vogler
- Johann Baptist Wanhal
- Samuel Wesley
- Paul Wranitzky
