= Maxim Vengerov =

Israeli violinist, violist, and conductor (born 1974)

Maxim Vengerov Максим Александрович Венгеров
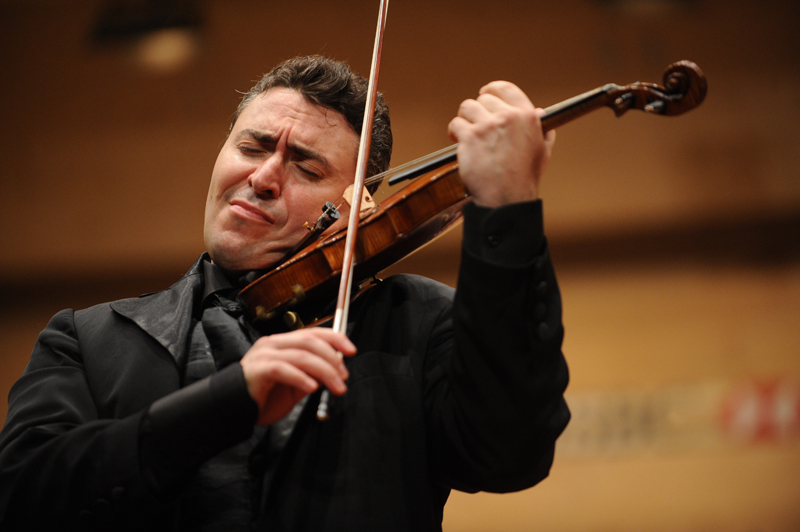

Background information
- Born: Maxim Alexandrovich Vengerov; 20 August 1974 (age 52); Novosibirsk, Russian SFSR, Soviet Union
- Genres: Classical; chamber music
- Occupations: Musician; conductor; professor
- Instruments: Violin, viola
- Years active: 1984–present
- Labels: Teldec; EMI Classics; VMV (Vengerov Music Vision)
- Website: www.maximvengerov.com

Maxim Alexandrovich Vengerov (Note: Russian: Максим Александрович Венгеров; Russian pronunciation: [mɐkˈsʲim ɐlʲɪkˈsandrəvʲɪtɕ vʲɪnˈɡʲerəf]) (Russian: Максим Александрович Венгеров; born 20 August 1974) is a Soviet-born Israeli violinist, violist, and conductor. Classic FM has called him "one of the greatest violinists in the world".

Vengerov was born in Novosibirsk, the only child of Aleksandr and Larisa Borisovna, an oboist and orphanage children's choir director, respectively. He began his musical journey early, singing in his mother's choir at the age of three and starting violin lessons at five with Galina Turchaninova.

At age 10, Vengerov won the 1984 International Karol Lipiński and Henryk Wieniawski Young Violin Player Competition, marking the start of his career. He subsequently studied with Zakhar Bron, following him from the Soviet Union to the Royal Academy of Music in London and then to the Musikhochschule Lübeck in Germany. In 1990, Vengerov won the International Carl Flesch Competition, securing a recording contract with Teldec and launching his international career.

Vengerov moved to Israel with his family in 1990, continuing his studies at the Jerusalem Academy of Music and Dance. In 2006, he founded the Musicians of Tomorrow school in northern Israel. His career also includes contributions as a conductor and educator, serving as the first chief conductor of the Menuhin Festival Gstaad Orchestra and holding professorships at institutions like the Royal College of Music in London. He has received numerous awards, including a Grammy and multiple Echo Music Prizes, and plays on the 1727 "ex-Kreutzer" Stradivarius violin.

== Early life ==
Vengerov was born in Novosibirsk, the only child of Aleksandr and Larisa Borisovna, oboist and orphanage children's choir director respectively, and is Jewish. He sang in his mother's choir from the age of three. He began studying the violin at age five with Galina Turchaninova. Upon meeting him, she asked: "Do you have strength in these hands?" The five-year-old punched her in the stomach as hard as he could. He said years later: "Fortunately, she was in a good mood that day, and she accepted me as a student."

Lessons went badly at first. Turchaninova was very strict. At one point, Vengerov stubbornly refused to play for her for five straight lessons. She told his mother that she was dismissing him as a student. His mother began to cry, and upon seeing that, Vengerov picked up his violin and played 17 assigned pieces from memory without interruption. Even though he had refused to play at his lessons, he had been practicing, with the encouragement of Natalie Gottlieb, a fellow student he has often called his inspiration. Turchaninova agreed to continue his lessons, saying: "Very well. A violinist like Maxim is born only once in a hundred years."

At age 10, Vengerov won the 1984 International Karol Lipiński and Henryk Wieniawski Young Violin Player Competition in Lublin, Poland. Also that year, he recorded on the Russian label Melodiya, on LP stereo. At age 11, as part of the Tchaikovsky Competition opening concert, he recorded again on LP, but digital. He then went to London, where he recorded his first CD, for Biddulph Records.

For the next five years, Vengerov studied with Zakhar Bron, who in 1987 left the Soviet Union to teach at the Royal Academy of Music in London. When Bron relocated to the Musikhochschule Lübeck in Germany, Vengerov followed. In 1990, Vengerov won the International Carl Flesch Competition, which led to a recording contract with Teldec and the launch of his international career.

== Adult career ==
Vengerov moved to Israel with his parents and grandmother in 1990, when he was 16. There, he studied at the Jerusalem Academy of Music and Dance. He has said that Israel "is in my genes" and that his "heart and soul belong to Israel." He goes to Israel whenever it is experiencing a conflict, saying: "I feel I’m a soldier with my rifle in my violin and bow. This tradition is from my predecessors. Isaac Stern used to do the same." In 1992, Vengerov performed Mozart's Violin Concerto No. 3 at the Salzburg Festival under Trevor Pinnock. In 2006, he founded a music school in the north of Israel, Musicians of Tomorrow, run by a former first violinist of the Israel Philharmonic. He has a home in Migdal, Israel, near Lake Kinneret. He has also played in a number of events commemorating the Holocaust.

In 1997, Vengerov became the first classical musician to be appointed an International Goodwill Ambassador by UNICEF, performing for children in Uganda, Thailand, and Kosovo. Playing by Heart, an American television production on NBC about Vengerov's meetings with young musicians during his master classes, screened at the 1999 Cannes Film Festival. He later took a two-year course in Baroque violin performance practice and repertoire. In 2005, he injured his right shoulder in a weightlifting accident, and while he recovered, he developed his interest and skill in conducting. He had surgery on the shoulder and a year of rehabilitation.

Vengerov has appeared as a soloist with the New York Philharmonic, Berlin Philharmonic, London Symphony Orchestra, BBC Symphony Orchestra, Mariinsky Theatre Orchestra, Chicago Symphony Orchestra, Montreal Symphony Orchestra, Toronto Symphony Orchestra, Filarmonica della Scala, and the Oxford Philharmonic Orchestra.

In 2010, Vengerov was appointed the first chief conductor of the Menuhin Festival Gstaad Orchestra. He continued his conducting studies with Yuri Simonov, and graduated with a diploma of excellence from the Ippolitov-Ivanov State Musical Pedagogical Institute in 2014. Vengerov then enrolled in a further two-year program of opera conducting. His work with contemporary composers includes premiering Qigang Chen's violin concerto La Joie de la souffrance.

During 2019–20, Vengerov was artist-in-residence with the Armenian State Symphony Orchestra. He is Ambassador and visiting professor at the Menuhin Music Academy in Switzerland (IMMA) and Polonsky Visiting professor of Violin at the Royal College of Music, London. Aside from teaching, Vengerov has also served on numerous competition juries, including the Donatella Flick Conducting Competition, the Yehudi Menuhin International Competition for Young Violinists, and also as chair of the Henryk Wieniawski Violin Competition in 2011 and 2016. He was featured in the 2021 video "4 Levels of Violin Masterclass" by YouTubers Brett Yang and Eddy Chen of TwoSet Violin, where Yang performed the Violin Sonata No. 3 (Ysaÿe) for Vengerov in a master class. In 2013, he conducted the finals of the Montreal International Violin Competition.

== Awards and honours ==
=== Awards ===
- 1984: winner of the International Karol Lipiński and Henryk Wieniawski Young Violin Player Competition
- 1990: winner of the International Carl Flesch Competition, London
- 1994, 1995: two Gramophone Classical Music Awards
- 1995, 1996, 1998, 2003, 2004: five Edison Classical Music Awards
- 1997, 2003: two Echo Music Prizes
- 2003: Grammy Award for Best Instrumental Soloist(s) Performance (with orchestra)
- 2004: Classic Brit Award
- 2007: World Economic Forum Crystal Award ("annual award for leading artists whose leadership has inspired inclusive and sustainable change")

=== Fellowships and honors ===
- Royal Academy of Music
- Honorary Visiting Fellowship at Trinity College, Oxford

=== Orders ===
- National Order of Merit of Romania
- Saarland Order of Merit
- 2019: Order of Cultural Merit (Monaco) (Knight)

== Instrument ==
Vengerov performs on the late-period 1727 "ex-Kreutzer" Stradivarius violin, made just after the "Golden Period" of Stradivarius violins and previously owned by Rodolphe Kreutzer, to whom Beethoven's 9th Violin Sonata was dedicated. On 1 April 1998, Vengerov purchased the violin from Christie's auction house with aid from patroness Japanese Countess Yoko Nagae Ceschina and violin dealer Haim Lazarov, for £947,500.

== Personal life ==
In 2011, Vengerov married Olga Gringolts, sister of the violinist Ilya Gringolts and an art historian. The couple have two daughters and one son. The family resides in Monaco.
