= Montreal International Musical Competition =

The Concours musical international de Montréal (CMIM) is an elite-level competition for classical musicians who are interested in pursuing an international career as a professional concert artist. Established in 2001 by the late André Bourbeau and by the late French-Canadian bass Joseph Rouleau, the CMIM features three disciplines - voice, violin and piano - on a rotating basis over a three-year cycle.

The CMIM is composed of four rounds: the preliminary round (based on video recordings), the first round, the semi-finals and the finals. Award winners receive prizes and grants valued at over $150,000. The 2024 edition, dedicated to the piano, will be followed by the voice edition in 2025 and the violin edition in 2026.

André Bourbeau was the president of the Competition since its first edition in 2002 and was succeeded by François R. Roy in 2018.

Since May 2004, the CMIM has been a member of the World Federation of International Music Competitions.

In September 2023, Chantal Poulin and Shira Gilbert were appointed as Executive Director and Artistic Director of the CMIM.

== Editions ==
=== 2024 ===
The 2024 edition of the CMIM was dedicated to piano. It took place from May 5 to 16 and featured 24 competitors aged 19 to 29 from twelve different countries. For the first time in its history, the competition included a Chamber Music round during the first stage of the semifinal.

Canadian pianist Jaeden Izik-Dzurko won the first prize of the Piano 2024 edition and became the first Canadian laureate of an instrumental edition of the Concours musical international de Montréal.

==== Laureates ====
Main Prizes
Rang	Concurrents	Pays
1st Prize	Jaeden Izik-Dzurko	Canada
2nd Prize	Gabriele Strata	Italy
3rd Prize	Anthony Ratinov	United States
Finalist	Elias Ackerley	UK / South Korea
Finalist	Jakub Kuszlik	Poland
Finalist	Derek Wang	United States

==== Special Prizes ====
Prix	Gagnant	Pays
ICI Musique Audience Award, Offered by ICI Musique	Gabriele Strata	Italy
Best Canadian Artist Award, Offered by the Bourbeau Foundation	Jaeden Izik-Dzurko	Canada
Best performance of a Sonata in the Semifinal, Offered by Anne Stevens	Jaeden Izik-Dzurko	Canada
André Bachand Award for the Best performance of the imposed Canadian work, Mzizaakok Miiniwaa Mzizaakoonsak (Horseflies and Deerflies) by Anishinaabekwe composer Barbara Assiginaak, Offered by Claudette Hould	Jaeden Izik-Dzurko	Canada
Chamber Music Award, Offered by Dixi Lambert and the Festival de musique de chambre de Montréal	Gabriele Strata	Italy
Junior Jury Prize	Jakub Kuszlik	Poland
Bita Cattelan Philanthropic Engagement Award Offered by Bita & Paolo Cattelan	Élisabeth Pion	Canada
Three CMIM Grants for the unranked finalists, Offered by the Rouleau Family, Morris & Rosalind Goodman Family Foundation, and Louise Roy	Elias Ackerley Jakub Kuszlik Derek Wang	UK / South KoreaPolandUnited States

=== 2023 ===
The twenty-second edition of the CMIM was dedicated to violin. First prize was won by Dmytro Udovychenko.

==== Laureates ====
Main prizes
Rank	Competitor	Country
First	Dmytro Udovychenko	Ukraine
Second	SongHa Choi	South Korea
Third	SooBeen Lee	South Korea
Finalist	Nathan Meltzer	United States
Finalist	Michael Shaham	Israel
Finalist	Ruslan Talas	Kazakhstan

==== Special prizes ====
Prize	Winner	Country
ICI Musique's People's Choice Award	SongHa Choi	South Korea
André-Bourbeau Award for the best Canadian artist	Not attributed	
Sonata Award for the best performance of a sonata in the Semi-final round	SongHa Choi	South Korea
André-Bachand Award for the best performance of the imposed Canadian work, L'inconnu.e bouleversant.e by Luna Pearl Woolf	SongHa Choi	South Korea
Award for the best performance of a work by J.S. Bach	Dmytro Udovychenko	Ukraine
Award for the best performance of a virtuosic work	Yesong Sophie Lee	United States
Bita Cattelan Philanthropic Engagement Award	Aaron Chan	Canada / China
CMIM grants awarded to the three unranked finalists	Nathan Meltzer; Michael Shaham; Ruslan Talas	United States; IsraelKazakhstan
John Newmark Prize for the Best Collaborative Pianist	Umi Garrett	United States

=== 2022 ===
The twenty-first edition of the CMIM was dedicated to voice and featured two divisions - aria and art song. First prize in Aria was won by Simone McIntosh. First prize in Art Song was won by Meredith Wohlgemuth.

==== Laureates ====
Main prizes - Aria
Rank	Competitor	Country
First	Simone McIntosh	Canada
Second	Sarah Dufresne	Canada
Third	Valerie Eickhoff	Germany
Finalist	Nils Wanderer	Germany
Finalist	Hugo Laporte	Canada

Main - Art Song
Rank	Competitor	Country
First	Meredith Wohlgemuth	United States
Second	Harriet Burns	United Kingdom
Third	Bryan Murray	United States

==== Special prizes ====
Prize	Winner	Country
ICI Musique People's Choice Award - Aria	Nils Wanderer	Germany
ICI Musique People's Choice Award - Art Song	Deepa Johnny	Canada
Best Canadian Artist Award - Aria	Simone McIntosh	Canada
Best Canadian Artist Award - Art Song	Deepa Johnny	Canada
Opera Aria Award	Simone McIntosh	Canada
French Art Song Award	Meredith Wohlgemuth	United States
German Lied Award	Harriet Burns	United Kingdom
John Newmark Award for best collaborative pianist	Jinhee Park	South Korea
Bita Cattelan Philanthropic Engagement Award	Adanya Dunn	Bulgaria / Canada
André Bachand Award for the Best Performance of a Canadian Work	Michael Lafferty	United Kingdom
Montreal students' coup de coeur Prize	Simone McIntosh Sarah Dufresne	CanadaCanada
CMIM grants awarded to two unranked finalists	Nils Wanderer Hugo Laporte	GermanyCanada

=== 2021 ===
The twentieth edition of the CMIM was dedicated to piano. First prize was won by Su Yeon Kim, from South Korea.

==== Laureates ====
Main prizes
Rank	Competitor	Country
First	Su Yeon Kim	South Korea
Second	Yoichiro Chiba	Japan
Third	Dimitri Malignan	France
Finalist	Alice Burla	Canada
Finalist	Francesco Granata	Italy
Finalist	Ying Li	China
Finalist	Chaeyoung Park	South Korea
Finalist	Marcel Tadokoro	France

==== Special prizes ====
Prize	Winner	Country
ICI Musique Audience Award	Dimitri Malignan	France
André-Bourbeau Award for the best Canadian artist	Alice Burla	Canada
Bita Cattelan Philanthropic Engagement Award	Anna Han	United States
André-Bachand Award for the best performance of the compulsory Canadian work	Alice Burla	Canada
Festival Bach Montréal Award for the best performance of a work by J.S. Bach	Dimitri Malignan	France
CMIM grants awarded to the five unranked finalists	Alice Burla; Francesco Granata; Ying Li; Chaeyoung Park; Marcel Tadokoro	Canada; Italy; China; South Korea; France

=== 2020 ===
The COVID-19 confinement and closing of international borders prevented this nineteenth edition of the CMIM to be held. Instead, every day from May 4 to May 18, 2020, from their respective locations, the selected competitors performed short recitals, in anticipation of the competition, which was postponed to 2021.

=== 2019 ===
The eighteenth edition of the CMIM was dedicated to violin. First prize was won by Hao Zhou.

==== Laureates ====
Main prizes
Rank	Competitor	Country
First	Hao Zhou	United States
Second	Johanna Pichlmair	Austria
Third	Fumika Mohri	Japan
Finalist	Elli Choi	United States / South Korea
Finalist	Anna Lee	United States / South Korea
Finalist	Christine Lim	United States / South Korea

==== Special prizes ====
Prize	Winner	Country
Radio-Canada People's Choice Award	Hao Zhou	United States
André-Bourbeau Award for the best Canadian artist	Not attributed	
Sonata Award for the best performance of a sonata in the semi-finals	Anna Lee	United States / South Korea
André-Bachand Award for the best performance of the compulsory Canadian work, Stand Alone by Michael Oesterle	Johanna Pichlmair	Austria
Montreal Bach Festival Award for the best performance of a work by J.S. Bach	Johanna Pichlmair	Austria
CMIM grants awarded to the three unranked finalists	Elli Choi; Yejin Noh; Jinhyung Park	United States; United States / South Korea; United States / South Korea

=== 2018 ===
The seventeenth edition of the CMIM was dedicated to voice and featured two divisions - aria and art song. First prize in Aria was won by Mario Bahg. First prize in Art Song was won by John Brancy.

==== Laureates ====
Main prizes
Rank	Competitor	Country
First	Mario Bahg	South Korea
Second	Emily D'Angelo	Canada
Third	Konstantin Lee	South Korea
Finalist	John Brancy	United States
Finalist	Mikhail Golovushkin	Russia
Finalist	Andrew Haji	Canada

==== Main Prizes - Art Song ====
Rank	Competitor	Country
First	John Brancy	United States
Second	Julien Van Mellaerts	New Zealand/United Kingdom
Third	Clara Osowksi	United States
Finalist	Gemma Summerfield	United Kingdom

==== Special prizes ====
Prize	Winner	Country
Radio-Canada People's Choice Award - Aria	Emily D'Angelo	Canada
Radio-Canada's People Choice Award - Art Song	Clara Osowksi	United States
Best Canadian Artist Award - Aria	Emily D'Angelo	Canada
Best Canadian Artist Award - Art Song	Rihab Chaieb	Canada
Opera Aria Award	Mario Bahg	South Korea
Oratorio Award	Andrew Haji	Canada
French Mélodie Award	John Brancy	United States
Lied Award	Julien Van Mellaerts	New Zealand/United Kingdom
John Newmark Award for best collaborative pianist	Joao Araujo	Portugal

=== 2017 ===
The sixteenth edition of the CMIM was dedicated to piano. The Grand prize was won by Zoltan Fejervari.

==== Laureates ====
Main prize
Rank	Competitor	Country
First	Zoltán Fejévári	Hungary
Second	Giuseppe Guarrera	Italy
Third	Stefano Andreatta	Italy
Finalist	Albert Cano Smit	Spain
Finalist	Yejin Noh	South Korea
Finalist	Jinhyung Park	South Korea

==== Special prizes ====
Prize	Winner	Country
Radio-Canada People's Choice Award	Giuseppe Guarrera	Italy
André-Bachand Award for the best performance of the compulsory Canadian work in the semifinals	Giuseppe Guarrera	Italy
Award for the best semifinal recital	Giuseppe Guarrera	Italy
Chopin Award for the most outstanding performance of a work for solo keyboard by Frédéric Chopin	Giuseppe Guarrera	Italy
Bach Award for the most outstanding performance of a work for solo keyboard by J.S. Bach	Giuseppe Guarrera	Italy
CMIM grants awarded to the three unranked finalists	Albert Cano Smit; Yejin Noh; Jinhyung Park	Spain /Netherlands; South Korea; South Korea

=== 2016 ===
The fifteenth edition of the CMIM was dedicated to violin. The Grand Prize was won by Ayana Tsuji.

==== Laureates ====
Main prize
Rank	Competitor	Country
First	Ayana Tsuji	Japan
Second	Bomsori Kim	South Korea
Third	Minami Yoshida	Japan
Finalist	Petteri Iivonen	Finland
Finalist	Ji Won Song	South Korea
Finalist	Fedor Rudin	Russia

==== Special prizes ====
Prize	Winner	Country
Radio-Canada People's Choice Award	Bomsori Kim	South Korea
André-Bachand Award for the best performance of the compulsory Canadian work in the semifinals	Ayana Tsuji	Japan
Award for the best semifinal recital	Ayana Tsuji	Japan
Award for the best performance of a Sonata in the semifinal round	Ayana Tsuji	Japan
Bach Award for the best performance of a work by J.S. Bach in the quarter-final round	Ayana Tsuji	Japan
Paganini Award for the best performance of a Caprice by Paganini in the quarter-final round	Ayana Tsuji	Japan
CMIM grants awarded to the three unranked finalists	Petteri Iivonen; Fedor Rudin; Ji Won Song	Finland; FranceRussia; South Korea

=== 2015 ===
The fourteenth edition of the CMIM was dedicated to voice. The Grand Prize was won by Keonwoo Kim.

==== Laureates ====
Laureates of the 2014 Montreal International Musical Competition
Rank	Competitor	Country	Vocal Range
First	Keonwoo Kim	South Korea	Tenor
Second	Hera Hyesang Park	South Korea	Soprano
Third	France Bellemare	Canada	Soprano
Finalist	Anaïs Constans	France	Soprano
Finalist	Vasil Garvanliev	(North Macedonia) Macedonia	Baritone
Finalist	Takaoki Onishi	Japan	Baritone

==== Special prizes ====
- Radio-Canada People's Choice Award
  - Hera Hyesang Park (soprano), South Korea
- André Bourbeau Award for the Best Canadian Artist
  - France Bellemare (soprano), Canada
- Joseph Rouleau Award for the Best Artist from Quebec
  - France Bellemare (soprano), Canada
- Award for the best semi-final recital
  - Anaïs Constans (soprano), France

=== 2014 ===
The thirteenth edition of the CMIM was dedicated to piano. The Grand Prize was won by Jayson Gillham.

==== Laureates ====
Laureates of the 2014 Montreal International Musical Competition
Rank	Competitor	Country
First	Jayson Gillham	Australia / United Kingdom
Second	Charles Richard-Hamelin	Canada
Third	Annika Treutler	Germany
Finalist	Kate Liu	United States
Finalist	Xiaoyu Liu	Canada
Finalist	Alexander Ullman	United Kingdom

==== Special prizes ====
- Radio-Canada People's Choice Award
  - Jayson Gillham, Australia/United Kingdom
- Award for the Best Performance of the Compulsory Canadian Work
  - Jayson Gillham, Australia/United Kingdom
- André Bourbeau Award for the Best Canadian Artist
  - Charles Richard Hamelin

=== 2013 ===
The twelfth edition of the CMIM was dedicated to violin. The Grand Prize was won by Marc Bouchkov.

==== Laureates ====
Laureates of the 2013 Montreal International Musical Competition
Rank	Competitor	Country
First	Marc Bouchkov	Belgium
Second	Stephen Waarts	United States
Third	Zeyu Victor Li	China
Finalist	Chi Li	Taiwan
Finalist	Ji Young Lim	South Korea
Finalist	Fédor Roudine	France

==== Special prizes ====
- Radio-Canada People's Choice Award
  - Stephen Waarts, United States
- Award for the Best Performance of the Compulsory Canadian Work
  - Luke Hsu, United States
- Wilder & Davis Award for the best semi-final recital
  - Marc Bouchkov, Belgium

=== 2012 ===
The eleventh edition of the Montreal International Musical Competition was dedicated to voice. The Grand Prize was won by Philippe Sly.

==== Laureates ====
Laureates of the 2012 Montreal International Musical Competition
Rank	Competitor	Country	Vocal Range
First	Philippe Sly	Canada	Bass Baritone
Second	Olga Kindler	Switzerland	Soprano
Third	John Brancy	United States	Baritone
Finalist	Won Whi Choi	South Korea	Tenor
Finalist	Emily Duncan-Brown	Canada	Soprano
Finalist	Yuri Gorodetski	Belarus	Tenor
Finalist	Sidney Outlaw	United States	Baritone
Finalist	Andréanne Paquin	Canada	Soprano

==== Special prizes ====
- Radio-Canada People's Choice Award
  - Philippe Sly (bass baritone), Canada
- Award for the Best Performance of the Compulsory Canadian Work
  - Philippe Sly (bass baritone), Canada
- Award for the Best Canadian Artist
  - Philippe Sly (bass baritone), Canada
- Joseph Rouleau Award for the Best Artist from Quebec
  - Philippe Sly (bass baritone), Canada
- Atma Classique Award for a CD Recording
  - Yuri Gorodetski (tenor), Belarus

=== 2011 ===
The tenth edition of the CMIM was dedicated to piano. The Grand Prize was won by Beatrice Rana.

==== Laureates ====
Laureates of the 2011 Montreal International Musical Competition
Rank	Competitor	Country
First	Beatrice Rana	Italy
Second	Lindsay Garritson	United States
Third	Henry Kramer	United States
Finalist	Yulia Chaplina	Russia
Finalist	Zheeyoung Moon	South Korea
Finalist	Jong Ho Won	South Korea

==== Special prizes ====
- Radio-Canada People's Choice Award
  - Beatrice Rana, Italy
- Award for the Best Performance of the Compulsory Canadian Work
  - Beatrice Rana, Italy
- Award for the Best Canadian Artist
  - Tina Chong, Canada
- Joseph Rouleau Award for the Best Artist from Quebec
  - Steven Massicotte, Canada

=== 2010 ===
The ninth edition of the CMIM was dedicated to violin. The Grand Prize was won by Benjamin Beilman.

==== Laureates ====
Laureates of the 2010 Montreal International Musical Competition
Rank	Competitor	Country
First	Benjamin Beilman	United States
Second	Korbinian Altenberger	Germany
Third	Nikita Borisoglebsky	Russia
Finalist	Noah Bendix-Balgley	United States
Finalist	Jaeyoung Kim	South Korea
Finalist	Kyoko Yonemoto	Japan

==== Special prizes ====
- Radio-Canada People's Choice Award
  - Benjamin Beilman, United States
- Award for the Best Canadian Artist
  - Nikki Chooi, Canada
- Joseph Rouleau Award for the Best Artist from Quebec
  - Boson Mo, Canada
- Award for the Best Performance of the Compulsory Canadian Work
  - Nikita Borisoglebsky (Baritone), Russia

=== 2009 ===
The eighth edition of the CMIM was dedicated to voice. The Grand Prize was won by Angela Meade.

==== Laureates ====
Laureates of the 2009 Montreal International Musical Competition
Rank	Competitor	Country	Vocal Range
First	Angela Meade	United States	Soprano
Second	Yannick-Muriel Noah	Canada	Soprano
Third	Andrew Garland	United States	Baritone

==== Special prizes ====
- "Tribute to André Turp" (People's Choice Award)
  - Angela Meade (Soprano), United States
- Award for the Best Canadian Artist
  - Yannick-Muriel Noah (Soprano), Canada
- Joseph Rouleau Prize (Best Candidate from Quebec)
  - Charlotte Corwin(Soprano), Canada
- Best performance of the Compulsory Canadian Work Award
  - Andrew Garland (Baritone), United States

=== 2008 ===
The seventh edition of the CMIM was dedicated to piano. The Grand Prize was won by Nareh Arghamanyan.

==== Laureates ====
Laureates of the 2008 Montreal International Musical Competition
Rank	Competitor	Country
First	Nareh Arghamanyan	Armenia
Second (ex aequo)	Alexandre Moutouzkine	Russia
Second (ex aequo)	Masataka Takada	Japan

==== Special prizes ====
- Award for the Best Performance of the Compulsory Canadian Work
  - Nareh Arghamanyan, Armenia
- People's Choice Award "Tribute to Yvonne Hubert"
  - Nareh Arghamanyan, Armenia
- Joseph Rouleau Award for the Best Artist from Quebec
  - Marie-Hélène Trempe, Canada
- Award for the Best Canadian Artist
  - Sergei Saratovsky, Canada

=== 2007 ===
The sixth edition of the CMIM was dedicated to voice. The Grand Prize was won by Marianne Fiset.

==== Laureates ====
Laureates of the 2006 Montreal International Musical Competition
Rank	Competitor	Country	Vocal range
First	Marianne Fiset	Canada	Soprano
Second	Steven Ebel	United States	Tenor
Third	Evgenia Grekova	Russia	Soprano
Fourth	Julie Boulianne	Canada	Mezzo-soprano
Fifth	Leticia Brewer	Canada	Soprano
Sixth	Peter Barrett	Canada	Baritone

==== Special prizes ====
- "Tribute to Leopold Simoneau" (People's Choice Award)
  - Marianne Fiset (Soprano), Canada
- Jean A. Chalmers Award (Best Canadian Candidate)
  - Marianne Fiset (Soprano), Canada
- Poulenc French Song Award (Best French Song performance by a Candidate)
  - Marianne Fiset (Soprano), Canada
- Joseph Rouleau Prize (Best Candidate from Quebec)
  - Marianne Fiset (Soprano), Canada
- Best performance of the Compulsory Canadian Work Award
  - Susanne Ellen Kirchesch (Soprano), Germany

=== 2006 ===
The fifth edition of the CMIM was dedicated to violin. The Grand Prize was won by Jinjoo Cho.

==== Laureates ====
Laureates of the 2006 Montreal International Musical Competition
Rank	Competitor	Country
First	Jinjoo Cho	South Korea
Second	Ye-Eun Choi	South Korea
Third	Marcus Tanneberger (German)	Germany
Fourth	Corinne Chapelle	United States
Fifth	Mayuko Kamio	Japan
Sixth	Dan Zhu	China

==== Special prizes ====
- "Tribute to Gilles Lefebvre" (People's Choice Award)
  - Jinjoo Cho, South Korea
- CBC Galaxie Rising Stars Award (Best Canadian Candidate)
  - Nikki Chooi, Canada
- Joseph Rouleau Prize (Best Candidate from Quebec)
  - Jean-Sébastien Roy, Canada
- Best Interpretation of the Compulsory Canadian Work Award
  - Ye-Eun Choi, South Korea

=== 2005 ===
The fourth edition of the CMIM was dedicated to voice. The Grand Prize was won by Sin Nyung Hwang.

==== Laureates ====
Laureates of the 2005 Montreal International Musical Competition
Place	Competitor	Country	Vocal Range
First	Sin Nyung Hwang	South Korea	Soprano
Second	Peter McGillivray	Canada	Baritone
Third	Elena Xanthoudakis	Australia	Soprano
Fourth (ex aequo)	Phillip Addis	Canada	Baritone
Fourth (ex aequo)	Anna Kasyan	Armenia	Soprano
Sixth	Chantal Dionne	Canada	Soprano

==== Special prizes ====
- "Tribute to Richard Verreau" (People's Choice Award)
  - Lauren Skuce (Soprano), United States
- Jean A. Chalmers Award (Best Canadian Candidate)
  - Peter McGillivray (Baritone), Canada
- CBC Galaxie Rising Stars Award (Best opera performance by a Canadian)
  - Phillip Addis (Baritone), Canada
- Joseph Rouleau Prize (Best Candidate from Quebec)
  - Phillip Addis (Baritone), Canada
- Best Interpretation of the Compulsory Canadian Work Award
  - Elena Xanthoudakis (Soprano), Australia

=== 2004 ===
The third edition of the CMIM was dedicated to piano. The Grand Prize was won by Serhiy Salov.

==== Laureates ====
Laureates of the 2004 Montreal International Musical Competition
Rank	Competitor	Country
First	Sergei Salov	Ukraine
Second	David Fray	France
Third	Daria Rabotkina	Russia
Fourth	Spencer Myer	United States
Fifth	Natalia Zagalskaia	Russia
Sixth	Darrett Zusko	Canada

==== Special prizes ====
- "Tribute to André Mathieu" (People's Choice Award)
  - Sergei Solov, Ukraine
- CBC Galaxie Rising Stars Award (Best Canadian Candidate)
  - Darrett Zusko, Canada
- Joseph Rouleau Prize (Best Candidate from Quebec)
  - Matthieu Fortin, Canada
- Best Interpretation of the Unpublished Compulsory Work Award
  - David Fray, France

=== 2003 ===
The second edition of the CMIM was dedicated to violin. The First Prize was won by Yossif Ivanov.

==== Laureates ====
Laureates of the 2003 Montreal International Musical Competition
Rank	Competitor	Country
First	Yossif Ivanov	Belgium
Second	Alexis Cardenas	Venezuela
Third	Matthieu Arama	France
Fourth	Nicolas Koeckert	Germany
Fifth	Oleg Kashiv	Ukraine
Sixth	Julia Sakharova	Russia

==== Special prizes ====
- "Tribute to Arthur LeBlanc" (People's Choice Award)
  - Alexis Cardenas, Venezuela
- CBC Galaxie Rising Stars Award (Best Canadian Candidate)
  - Sarah Pratt, Canada
- Joseph Rouleau Prize (Best Candidate from Quebec)
  - Jean-Sébastien Roy, Canada
- Best Interpretation of the Unpublished Compulsory Work Award
  - Diana Galvydyte, Lithuania

=== 2002 ===
The inaugural CMIM was dedicated to voice. The First Prize was won by Measha Brueggergosman.

==== Laureates ====
Laureates of the 2002 Montreal International Musical Competition
Rank	Competitor	Country	Vocal Range
First	Measha Brueggergosman	Canada	Soprano
Second	Burak Bilgili	Turkey	Bass
Third	Joseph Kaiser	Canada	Baritone
Fourth	Mélanie Boisvert	Canada	Soprano
Fifth	Daesan No	South Korea	Baritone
Sixth	John Matz	United States	Tenor

==== Special prizes ====
- People's Award
  - Measha Brueggergosman (Soprano), Canada
- Jean A. Chalmers Award (Best Canadian Candidate)
  - Measha Brueggergosman (Soprano), Canada
- Joseph Rouleau Prize (Best Candidate from Quebec)
  - Joseph Kaiser (Baritone), Canada
- Best Interpretation of the Unpublished Compulsory Work Award
  - Measha Brueggergosman (Soprano), Canada
