= Tokyo Ensemble =

The Tokyo Ensemble is a chamber orchestra composed of the best Japanese bowed string instruments and if necessary completed with wind instruments. It is one of the few chamber orchestras in the world that can perform without a conductor because, due to intense rehearsals, the ensemble plays like a string quartet. The Tokyo Ensemble is not a full-time institution but operates on a project basis similar to the famous Chamber Orchestra of Europe. Once or twice a year, the members of the Ensemble meet for rehearsal sessions as well as concerts and tours.

There are few chamber ensembles and orchestras in Japan. With the exception of the Tokyo String Quartet founded in the United States, no Japanese chamber ensemble has obtained international recognition.

== History ==
Founded in 2001 by the violinist and conductor Jōji Hattori, the Tokyo Ensemble received an invitation from the Tokyo Opera City Foundation in its first year. Other national and international performances soon followed, including an invitation to Seoul in 2002, a tour in Portugal in June 2003 with the pianist Maria João Pires, in China in 2005 and in August 2006, a tour in Canada at the invitation of the Vancouver Festival.

On the occasion of the first concert dedicated to the Japanese composer Ikuma Dan, the Ensemble played his last work Two fragments in black and yellow for solo violin and string quartet.
