= Yehudi Menuhin International Competition for Young Violinists =

International violin competition

- Formation: 1983
- Founder: Yehudi Menuhin
- Purpose: Classical music competition
- Board President: Etienne d’Arenberg
- Vice President: Joji Hattori
- Patron: Zamira Menuhin-Benthall
- Website: menuhincompetition.org

The Yehudi Menuhin International Competition for Young Violinists (or simply the Menuhin Competition) is an international music competition for violinists under the age of 16. It was founded by Yehudi Menuhin in 1983 with the goal of nurturing young violinists. In its early years, the competition took place in Folkestone on the south coast of England. Since 1998, it has been held biennially in different cities around the world. Several of the competition's past laureates, including Julia Fischer, Tasmin Little, and Nikolaj Znaider, have gone on to major international careers.

== Competition ==
A member of the European Union of Music Competitions for Youth (EMCY), the Menuhin Competition runs every two years. Recent competitions have been live-streamed on the Internet.

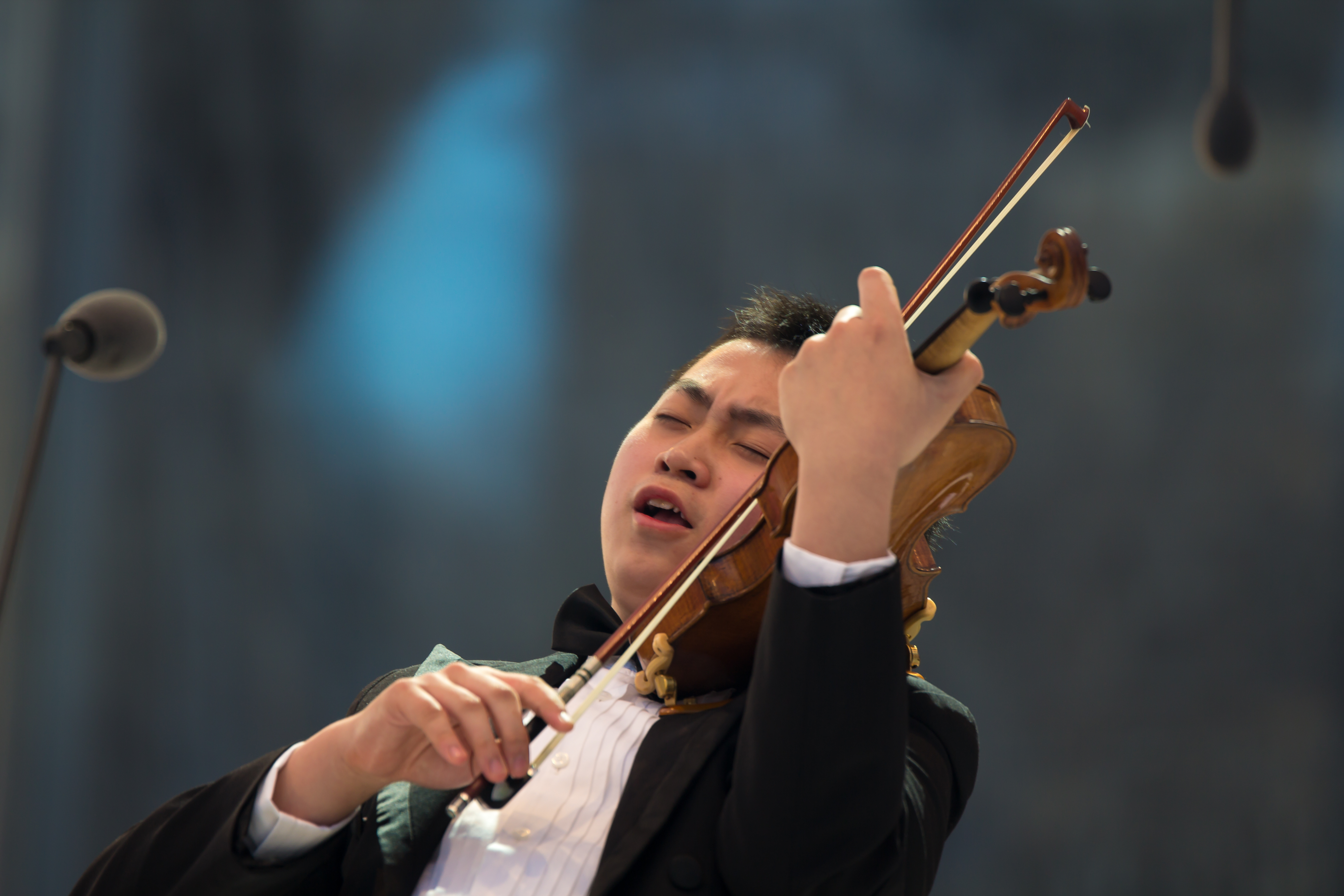
Ziyu He, Senior First Prize winner in 2016.

The competition is open to violinists of any nationality under the age of 22. The competitors are pre-selected by video recording and compete in three rounds during the actual competition. There is a required repertoire, which is chosen by the competition's organizers. However, the competitors also play a virtuoso violin work of their own choice as part of the semi-finals. In the first round, each competitor is also given a four to eight bar phrase on which to improvise for three minutes.

In later years the required repertoire and the gala concerts have included new works especially commissioned for the competition or works closely associated with the host country. At the 2010 Oslo competition, the previously required works by Paganini were replaced with works by the Norwegian violinist and composer Ole Bull to mark the bicentenary of his birth. The 2008 competition in Cardiff saw the world premiere of Welsh composer Mervyn Burtch's Elegy for King Arthur. The 2014 Austin, Texas competition included two world premieres of Texas-themed works: Donald Grantham's Black-eyed Suzy and Dan Welcher's The Cowboy and the Rattlesnake. The three commissioned works premiered at the 2016 London competition were John Rutter's Visions, Roxanna Panufnik's Hora Bessarabia and Òscar Colomina Bosch's Shpigl.

In the Senior category cash prizes are awarded to the top four places, while in the Junior category (under 16 years old) cash prizes are awarded to the top five places. There are also a number of individual cash prizes. These include the Bach Prize for the best performance of Johann Sebastian Bach's violin works, donated in memory of Robert Masters, the founding director of the Yehudi Menuhin School. The First Prize winner in the Senior category also receives a one-year loan of a "golden age" Stradivarius violin. The First Prize winner of the Junior category receives a one-year loan of a "fine old Italian violin".

The 2016 competition had 44 competitors—37 girls and seven boys. The top four prizes in the Senior category were won by young violinists from China, South Korea, and Taiwan. The top prize-winners in the Junior category were from the United States, South Korea, Sweden, and Germany.

== History ==
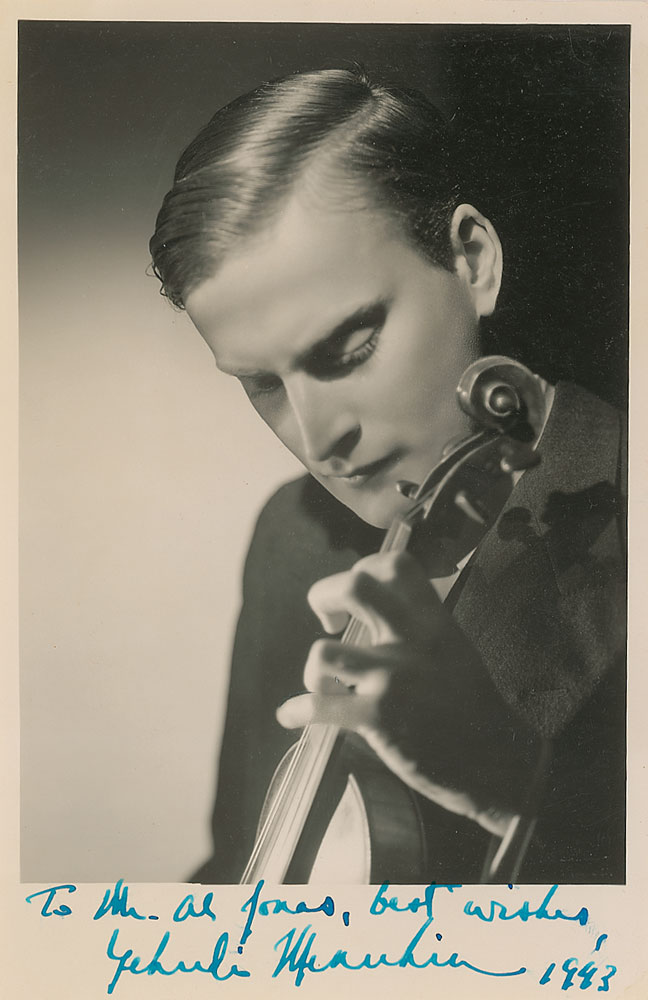
Yehudi Menuhin, the competition's founder and namesake.

The competition was founded by Yehudi Menuhin and Robert Masters, who had been instrumental in the founding of the Yehudi Menuhin School. The competition took place for the first time in 1983 at Folkestone on the south coast of England and was based there for its first 15 years with Menuhin himself conducting master classes for the competitors. Following a three-year gap after the 1995 competition, it resumed in 1998 at Boulogne-sur-Mer on the French side of the English Channel and returned to Folkestone in 2000. At the inauguration of the first competition, Yehudi Menuhin said:

Our young gifted violinists will be the ambassadors of goodwill, for they come with pure hearts and music in their souls. It is in those younger people that we invest our future.

After Menuhin's death, the pianist Gordon Back, who had been the competition's accompanist since its founding, took over the Artistic Directorship of the competition, expanding the program into a festival format with the competition taking place amidst concerts, master classes, and education and outreach events. The competition also began moving its venue to a different international city each time. From 2002 to 2014, the competition was held in:

- Boulogne-sur-Mer, based at the École nationale de musique et de danse (2002)
- London, based at the Royal Academy of Music (2004)
- Boulogne-sur-Mer, based at the École nationale de musique et de danse (2006)
- Cardiff, based at the Royal Welsh College of Music and Drama with its gala concerts held in St David's Hall (2008)
- Oslo, based at the Norwegian Academy of Music (2010)
- Beijing, based at China's Central Conservatory of Music (2012)
- Austin, Texas, based at the Sarah and Ernest Butler School of Music (2014)

In 2016, the 100th anniversary of Menuhin's birth, the competition returned to London, where once again it was based at the Royal Academy of Music, with its gala concerts held at the Royal Festival Hall. The 2018 competition was held in Geneva, Switzerland. The 2021 competition was held in Richmond, Virginia.

== Organization ==
The Menuhin Competition is operated by the ‘Fondation Concours Menuhin’, a foundation registered in Switzerland. Its president is H.S.H. Prince Etienne d’Arenberg. The foundation also has close ties to the Menuhin family. Yehudi Menuhin's daughter Zamira Menuhin-Benthall is its Life Patron and his grandson Aaron Menuhin serves as one of the trustees.

Past jury members have included American violinist Pamela Frank, Maxim Vengerov, Dong-Suk Kang, Arabella Steinbacher, Ray Chen, Jeremy Menuhin, Julia Fischer, and Tasmin Little.

== Notable laureates ==
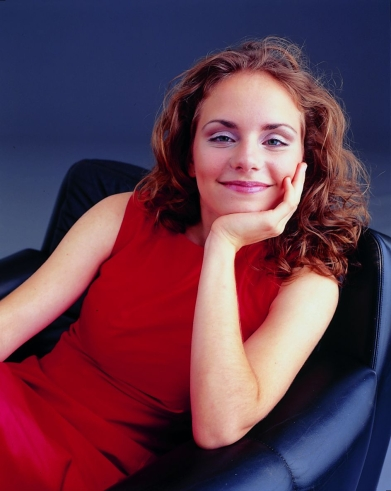
Julia Fischer, Junior First Prize winner in 1995 and member of the 2016 competition jury.

Past laureates who have gone on to international careers include:

- Jiafeng Chen (Senior category 2nd prize in 2008)
- Ray Chen (Junior category 3rd Prize, 2004 and Senior category 1st prize in 2008)
- Julia Fischer (Junior category 1st Prize in 1995)
- Ilya Gringolts (Junior category 6th Prize in 1995)
- Joji Hattori (Senior category 4th Prize in 1987 and Senior category 1st Prize, Bach Prize, and Audience Prize in 1989)
- Daishin Kashimoto (Junior category 1st Prize in 1993)
- Tasmin Little (Senior category 3rd Prize in 1983 and Senior category 2nd Prize in 1985)
- Lara St. John (Junior category 4th Prize in 1985)
- Nikolaj Znaider (Senior category 5th Prize and Audience Prize in 1991)

As both Erica Jeal (the Guardian's music critic) and Gordon Back (the competition's artistic director) pointed out, winning the First Prize is no guarantee of a major career, and sometimes those who have become internationally renowned were not First Prize winners.

== Previous prize winners ==
Prizes are awarded in two categories: Senior for violinists aged 16 to 21, and Junior for violinists under the age of 16. Violinists aged 15 are permitted to enter the Senior category if they wish. The Senior category awards cash prizes to the top four places, while the Junior category awards cash prizes to the top five places. (Prior to 2002, the competition also awarded 6th, and on occasion 7th, prizes in the Junior category.) As of 2016, the 1st prize in the Senior category was £10,000 and the 1st prize in the Junior category was £5,000. There are also a number of special prizes and awards. In 2018, for the first time in the competition's history, there was a joint 1st prize in the Junior category.

=== Senior category ===
Year	1st Prize	2nd Prize	3rd Prize	4th Prize
2021	María Dueñas	Simon Zhu	Hana Chang	Karisa Chiu
2018	Diana Adamyan	Nathan Mierdl	Hyunjae Lim	Tianyou Ma
2016	Ziyu He	SongHa Choi	Yu-Ting Chen	Jeein Kim
2014	Stephen Waarts	In Mo Yang	Christine Seohyun Lim	Stephen Kim
2012	Kenneth Renshaw	Ji Eun Anna Lee	Alexi Kenney	Siyan Guo
2010	Xiang Yu	Nigel Armstrong	Suyeon Kang	Ji Won Song
2008	Ray Chen	Jiafeng Chen	Evgeny Sviridov	Stella Chen
2006	Hrachya Avanesyan	Robin Scott	Shuai Shi	Sulki Yu
2004	Hye-Jin Kim	Daniel Khalikov	Je Hye Lee	Yusuke Hayashi
2002	Soyoung Yoon	Rintarō Ōmiya	Simone Lamsma	Maksim Brylinski
2000	Akiko Ono	Feng Ning	Viatcheslav Chestiglazov	Chen Gu
1998	Susie Park	Akiko Ono	Boris Brovtsyn	Xu Yang
1995	Lisa Kim	Corina Belcea	Yoo-Kyung Min	Zhanna Tonaganyan
1993	Gabriela Demeterová	Alina Komissarova	Stefan Milenkovich	Márta Ábrahám
1991	--	Qing Guo	Evgeny Andrusenko	Birgit Kolar
1989	Joji Hattori	Yuan-Qing Yu	Bartlomiej Niziol	Karen Lee
1987	Elisabeth Glass	Elisa Barston	Zheng Qing	Joji Hattori
1985	Xiao-Dong Wang	Tasmin Little	Liang Chai	Abigail Young
1983	Leland Chen	Isabelle van Keulen	Tasmin Little	He Hong Ying

Other prizes

- 2021: Audience Prize – María Dueñas

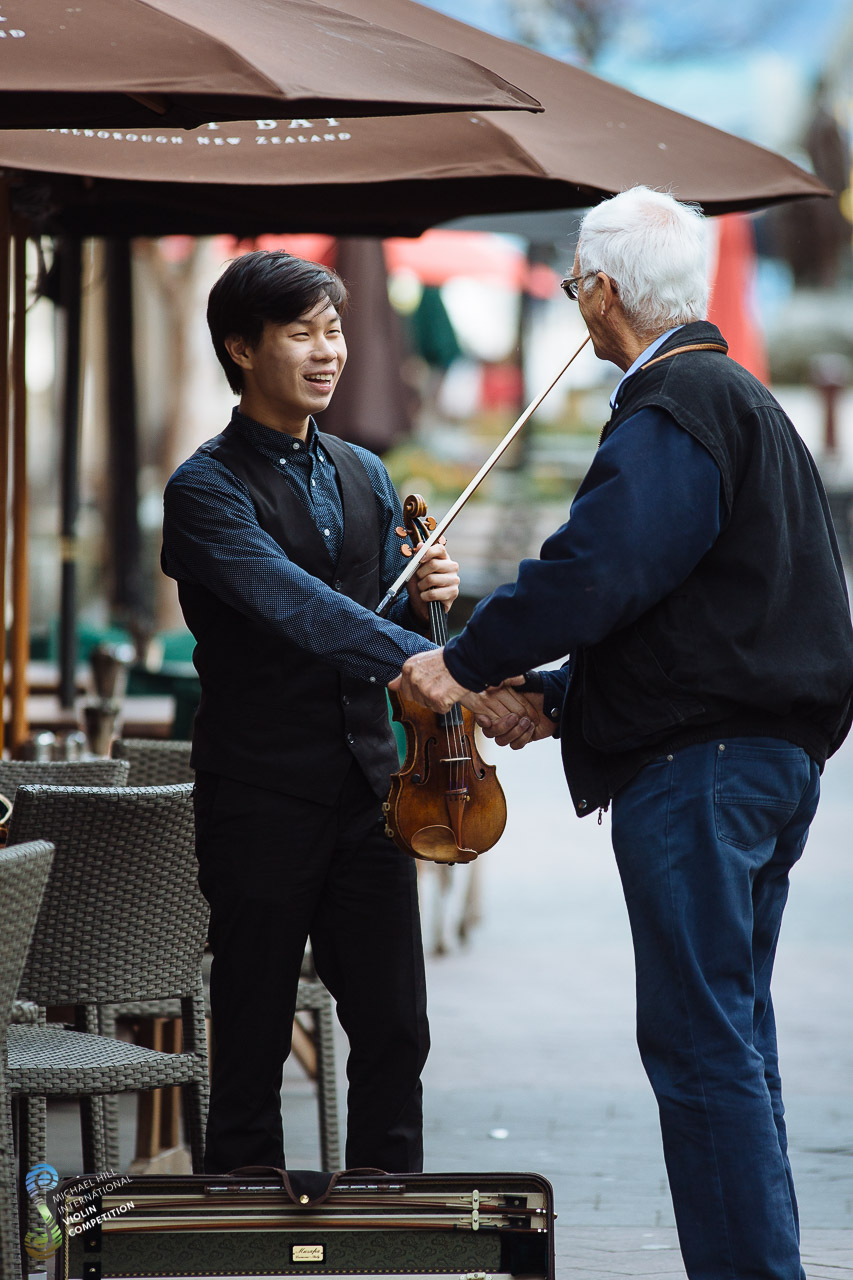
Timothy Chooi, winner of the 2014 EMCY Prize and the 2010 Violin Prize.

- 2014: EMCY Prize – Timothy Chooi
- 2012: EMCY Prize – Kenneth Renshaw
- 2012: Bach Prize – Gabriel Ng
- 2012: Composer's Prize – Victor Zeyu Li
- 2010: Violin Prize – Timothy Chooi
- 2008: Bach Prize – Evgeny Sviridov
- 2006: Composer's Prize – Samika Honda
- 2006: Outstanding Performance in Semi-Finals – Dragos Mihail Manza
- 2006: Outstanding Performance in Semi-Finals – Mathieu van Bellen
- 2004: Chamber Music Award – Anthony Sabberton
- 2002: Composer's Prize – Anna Savytska
- 1995: Audience Prize – Lisa Kim
- 1995: President's Prize – Lisa Kim + Natalia Lomeiko
- 1995: Bach Prize – Zhanna Tonaganyan
- 1993: Audience Prize – Gabriela Demeterová
- 1991: Bach Prize – Qing Guo + Eugeny Andrusenko
- 1991: Senior 5th Prize – Nikolaj Znaider
- 1991: Audience Prize – Nikolaj Znaider
- 1989: Bach Prize – Joji Hattori
- 1989: Audience Prize – Joji Hattori
- 1987: Bach Prize – Elisabeth Glass + Zheng Qing
- 1987: Audience Prize – Elisa Barston
- 1985: Bach Prize – Xiao-Dong Wang
- 1985: Tunnicliffe Prize – Xiao-Dong Wang
- 1985: Audience Prize – Abigail Young
- 1983: Bach Prize – Leland Chen
- 1983: Audience Prize – Isabelle van Keulen
- 1983: Senior 5th Prize – Dorota Siuda
- 1983: Senior 6th Prize – Micha Sugiura

=== Junior category ===
Year	1st Prize	2nd Prize	3rd Prize	4th Prize	5th Prize	6th Prize	7th Prize
2021	Keila Wakao	Edward Walton	Hannah Wan Ching Tam	Kento Hong	Boha Moon	--	--
2018	Chloe Chua & Christian Li	--	Ruibing Liu	Clara Shen	Hina Khuong-Huu	Guido Sant'Anna	--
2016	Yesong Sophie Lee	Kevin Miura	Johan Dalene	NaKyung Kang	Anne Luisa Kramb	--	--
2014	Rennosuke Fukuda	Daniel Lozakovitj	Ludvig Gudim	Alex Zhou	Jaewon Wee	--	--
2012	Kevin Zhu	Soo-Been Lee	Taiga Tojo	Grace Clifford	Yehun Jin	--	--
2010	Kerson Leong	Stephen Waarts	Ji Eun Anna Lee	Taiga Tojo	Callum Smart	--	--
2008	Chad Hoopes	Dmitry Smirnov	Mindy Chen	Ke Zhu	Seohyun Lim	--	--
2006	Sunao Goko	Fumiaki Miura	Yu-Chien Tseng	Robyn Bollinger	Stella Chen	Sirena Huang	--
2004	Joel C. Link	Danbi Um	Ray Chen; Yoo Jin Jang	--	Esther Kim	--	--
2002	Chiharu Taki	Yyun-Su Shin	Marcus Tanneberger	Jennifer Pike	Saki Shirokoji	Alexandra Korobkina	--
2000	Mi Sa Yang	Alina Ibragimova	Naoto Sakiya	Yossif Ivanov	Hye Jin Kim	Ja Ram Kim	--
1998	Zhi-Jiong Wang	Oleg Yatsina	Mikhail Simonyan	Mayuko Kamio	Sophie Moser	Yoon Jung Cho	--
1995	Julia Fischer	Jeanne de Ricaud	Piotr Kwaśny	Teruyoshi Shirata	Daniel Khalikov	Ilya Gringolts	Sally Cooper
1993	Daishin Kashimoto	Igor Malinovsky	Wei Wei Le	Yi Jia Hou	Natasha Lomeiko	Akiko Ono	--
1991	Ning Kam	Wen-Lei Gu	Jennifer Koh	Yonatan Gandelsman	Natsuko Yoshimoto	Mona Marie Knock	Janine Jansen
1989	Livia Sohn	Sylvie Sentenac	Mu Na	Jennifer Koh	Ye Sha	Krzysztof Baranowski	--
1987	Dong Kun	Bartłomiej Nizioł	Suzy Whang	Ryōtarō Itō	David Chan	Carla Kihlstedt	--
1985	Chang Guo	Elizabeth Glass	Scott St. John	Lara St. John	David Le Page	Chwan-Liang Lee	--
1983	Xiao-Dong Wang	Zheng-Rong Wang	Le Zhang	Julian Shevlin	Lü Siqing	Eunice Lee	--

Other prizes

- 2012: Composer's Prize – Kevin Zhu
- 2010: EMCY Prize – Guro Kleven Hagen
- 2008: Composer's Prize – Yu-Ah Ok
- 2002: Chairman's Special Prize – Esther Kim
- 1995: Junior 7th Prize – Sally Cooper
- 1991: Audience Prize – Jennifer Koh
- 1989: Audience Prize – Livia Sohn
- 1987: Audience Prize – Suzy Whang
- 1985: Audience Prize – Scott St. John

== See also ==
- List of classical music competitions
