= Soyoung Yoon =

South Korean violinist (born 1984)

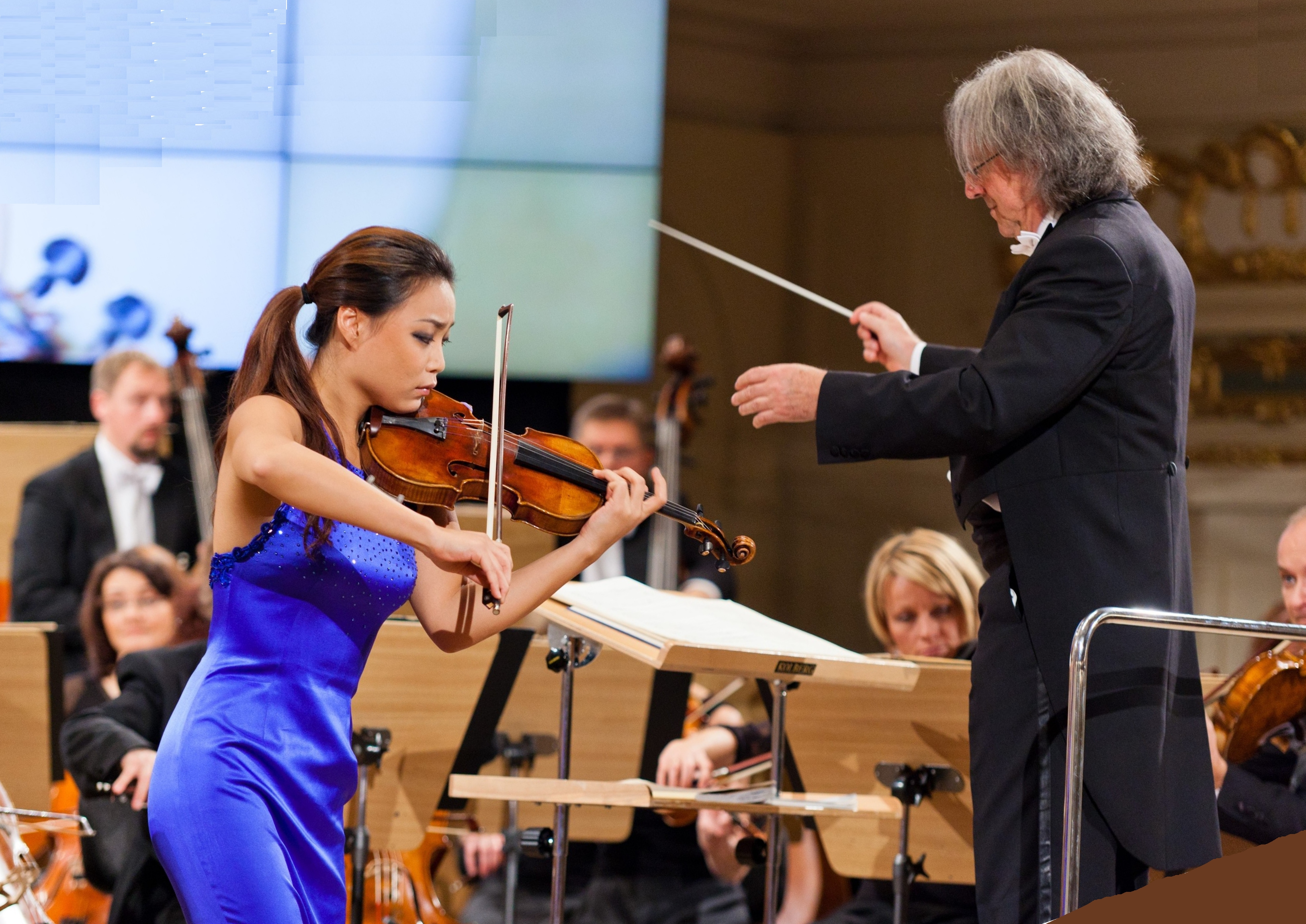
- Yoon at the 14th International Henryk Wieniawski Violin Competition, with conductor Marek Pijarowski
- Born: 28 October 1984 (age 41); Seoul, South Korea
- Education: Korea National University of Arts; Hochschule für Musik und Tanz Köln; Zurich University of the Arts
- Occupation: Violinist

Korean name
- Hangul: 윤소영
- RR: Yun Soyeong
- MR: Yun Soyŏng

Soyoung Yoon (Korean: 윤소영; born 28 October 1984) is a South Korean classical violinist. She is a first-prize winner of the Yehudi Menuhin International Competition for Young Violinists and the Henryk Wieniawski Violin Competition, and has also been a laureate of the Queen Elisabeth Competition and the International Violin Competition of Indianapolis.

== Early life and education ==
Yoon was born in Seoul, South Korea, and began studying the violin at the age of five. She attended Yewon Middle School for Arts and Seoul Arts High School, and then studied at the Korea National University of Arts with Kim Nam-yun. She continued her studies in Germany at the Hochschule für Musik in Cologne and in Switzerland at the Zurich University of the Arts, studying with Zakhar Bron.

Yoon plays the 1773 ex-Bückeburg violin by Giovanni Battista Guadagnini.

== Career ==
Yoon first attracted international attention through major violin competitions. She won first prize at the 2002 Yehudi Menuhin International Competition for Young Violinists, first prize at the Cologne International Music Competition in 2003, the Tibor Varga International Violin Competition in 2005, and the David Oistrakh International Violin Competition in 2006. In 2009 she won sixth prize at the Queen Elisabeth Competition in Brussels, and in 2010 she received the silver medal at the International Violin Competition of Indianapolis.

In 2011 Yoon won first prize and the gold medal at the 14th Henryk Wieniawski Violin Competition in Poznań, Poland. Polish press coverage described her as the winner of the competition's first prize, €30,000 and gold medal. In 2024 she won first prize at the inaugural Tokyo Classic Violin Competition, part of the Classic Violin Olympus initiative.

Yoon has appeared as soloist with orchestras including the Czech National Symphony Orchestra, Prague Philharmonia, Bilbao Orkestra Sinfonikoa, Deutsche Kammerphilharmonie Bremen, NDR Elbphilharmonie Orchestra, Russian National Orchestra, Sofia Philharmonic Orchestra, Royal Philharmonic Orchestra, Geneva Chamber Orchestra, Belgian National Orchestra, Polish National Radio Symphony Orchestra, Bern Symphony Orchestra, İzmir State Symphony Orchestra, Trondheim Symphony Orchestra, Trondheim Soloists and Zurich Chamber Orchestra. Earlier career biographies also list appearances with the Moscow Virtuosi, London Mozart Players, the National Radio Orchestra of Kiev, the Basque National Orchestra, the Philharmonie der Nationen, the West German Radio Symphony Orchestra and the North German Radio Symphony Orchestra.

Her collaborations with conductors and senior musicians have included Krzysztof Penderecki, Ivor Bolton, Krzysztof Urbański, Muhai Tang, Maxim Vengerov, Eiji Oue, Michal Nesterowicz, Gilbert Varga, Mario Venzago, Antoni Wit, Nayden Todorov, Sascha Goetzel, Yi-Chen Lin and Jesko Sirvend.

== Chamber music ==
Yoon was a member of the Stradivari Quartett Zurich from 2009 to 2012. In 2012 she founded the ORION String Trio with violist Veit Hertenstein and cellist Benjamin Gregor-Smith. The trio won the first prize and audience prize at the 15th Chamber Music Competition of the Migros-Kulturprozent in Zurich in 2016.

== Recordings ==
In 2012 Yoon recorded the violin concertos of Jean Sibelius and Pyotr Ilyich Tchaikovsky with the Gorzów Philharmonic Orchestra and conductor Piotr Borkowski, released by the Henryk Wieniawski Musical Society and DUX. A review quoted by Presto Music from Gramophone described the performances as "meticulous" and "highly disciplined", praising the clarity and beauty of tone. MusicWeb International described the recording as a commemoration of her 2011 Wieniawski Competition victory and praised the freshness of the orchestral playing.

She has also recorded Astor Piazzolla's Four Seasons and Mendelssohn's Concerto for Violin, Piano and String Orchestra with pianist Ksenia Kogan and the Korean Chamber Orchestra.

== Awards ==
- First prize, Yehudi Menuhin International Competition for Young Violinists, 2002
- First prize, Cologne International Music Competition, 2003
- Winner, Tibor Varga International Violin Competition, 2005
- Grand Prix, David Oistrakh International Violin Competition, Odesa, Ukraine, 2006
- Prize winner, International Tchaikovsky Competition, 2007
- Sixth prize, Queen Elisabeth Competition, 2009
- Silver medal, International Violin Competition of Indianapolis, 2010
- First prize and gold medal, Henryk Wieniawski Violin Competition, 2011
- First prize, Tokyo Classic Violin Competition, 2024
