= Dejan Bogdanović =

Serbian-Italian violinist

- Bogdanović in concert in Italy, 2007

Background information
- Born: 1966 (age 59–60); Novi Sad, SR Serbia, Yugoslavia
- Genres: Classical music
- Occupation: Violinist
- Instrument: Violin
- Years active: 1980s–present
- Awards: Vienna International Competition (First Prize, 1985); Yugoslav National Competition (First Prize, 1987)
- Website: www.dejanbogdanovich.com

Dejan Bogdanović (Serbian: Дејан Богдановић) is a Serbian-Italian classical violinist active in Europe since the 1980s.

== Early life and education ==
Bogdanović studied violin at the Isidor Bajić School of Music in Novi Sad. He later continued his studies at the University of Novi Sad, where he trained with teachers associated with the Russian violin school, including Eugenia Cugaeva, Marina Jasvili, Ilya Grubert and Zinaida Gilels.

At the age of seventeen, he performed violin concertos by Niccolò Paganini and Felix Mendelssohn with the Dubrovnik Symphony Orchestra.

== Career ==
Bogdanović has appeared as a soloist with orchestras in Serbia and abroad, including performances in Prague, Vienna, Moscow and other European cities.

His repertoire includes major violin concertos by composers such as Bach, Mozart, Beethoven, Mendelssohn, Tchaikovsky, Paganini and Wieniawski.

In 1988 he participated in the Festival Culturale di San Cirillo e San Matteo. He later undertook further specialization at the P. I. Tchaikovsky Conservatory in Moscow under Viktor Tretiakov.

He has appeared at international festivals including the Kuhmo Chamber Music Festival in Finland and the Dubrovnik Summer Festival.

Bogdanović relocated to Italy in the early 1990s, where he has continued his concert activity and teaching career. He has conducted masterclasses and courses in several Italian cities, including Bolzano, Padua, Trieste and Bergamo.

From 2000 to 2001 he served as artistic director of the concert season "Camera della Musica" in Forlì.

== Teaching ==
In addition to his concert career, Bogdanović has been involved in higher music education in Serbia and Italy. He has taught violin at the University of Novi Sad and later at institutions in Italy, including programs in Bergamo.

== Selected appearances ==
Bogdanović has performed in venues and festivals across Europe, including concerts reported by independent media outlets such as RTV and Times of Malta.

== See also ==
- List of contemporary classical violinists
