= Igor Malinovsky =

Russian violinist (born 1977)

Igor Malinovsky (Igor Vladimirovich Malinovsky, Russian: Игорь Владимирович Mалиновский) is a Russian concert violinist and Professor of violin. He was born in Sverdlovsk (Yekaterinburg) on 6 November 1977. He received Austrian citizenship as a reward for his artistic services to the country.

== Education ==
Malinovsky was born on 6 November 1977 in Sverdlovsk, USSR, into a family with a long musical tradition. He began to play the violin at the age of six and soon afterwards began his formal studies at the Urals Mussorgsky State Conservatoire in Yekaterinburg with Prof. Vladimir Milstein.

In 1991 Malinovsky moved to Vienna and became an Austrian citizen in 1995.

He graduated from the Vienna University of Music and Performing Arts, where he studied with Prof. Dora Schwarzberg and Prof. Gerhard Schulz from 1992-1997 and since 1998, he continued his studies at Cologne University and the Zürich University of Music where he graduated with Professor Zakhar Bron.

== Professional career ==
From an early age, Igor Malinovsky performed with renowned orchestras as a soloist such as the Zagreb Philharmonic, the Moscow Philharmonic, in Gasteig/Munich, in the Vienna Musikverein and the Vienna Konzerthaus, in the Kongresshalle Lucherne and participated as soloist on tours of Asia, South America and Europe. Igor Malinovsky was the first concertmaster of the Bavarian State Orchestra (music director Zubin Mehta) 2002 - 2005, the Orchestra of the Komischen Oper Berlin (music director Kirill Petrenko) 2005-2010 and the Orchestra Palau de les Arts Reina Sofia in Valencia (music director Lorin Maazel). As concertmaster, he has been invited to lead the Bavarian Radio Symphony Orchestra, the New York Philharmonic Orchestra, the West German Radio Symphony Orchestra in Cologne, the Staatskapelle Dresden, the Frankfurt Opera Orchestra, the Nuremberg Philharmonic Orchestra, Orchestra Arturo Toscanini, the Frankfurt Radio Symphony Orchestra, the Essen Philharmonic Orchestra, the Beethoven Orchestra in Bonn, and many more.

Since 2011 Igor Malinovsky has been professor of violin at the University of Music „Carl Maria von Weber“, Dresden in Germany and guest professor at the Escola Superior de Musica de Catalunya, Barcelona.

Furthermore, he regularly holds international master classes.

Igor Malinovsky is honorary member of the Switzerland Rotaryclub Kreuzlingen-Konstanz and he was awarded the Paul Harris Fellow Award highlighting his generosity in the benefit concerts for the Mine-Ex Project.

== Prizes ==
Igor Malinovsky has won prizes in numerous international competitions such as First Prize in the "Madeira-Music-Festival" International Violin Competition in Portugal in 2002, prize winner at the Pablo Sarasate International Violin Competition, Pamplona, Spain in 2001, prize winner at the Fritz Kreisler International Competition in Vienna in 1996, 2nd Prize in the Rodolfo Lipizer International Violin Competition, Italy in 1994, First Prize at the Demidov International Violin Competition, Russia, and Second Prize at the Menuhin Competition in Folkestone, England in 1993, Laureate of Wieniawski Competition in Lublin, Poland in 1991 and First Prize winner and Winner of the Grand Prix at the Diaghilev Violin Competition, Moscow in 1990.

== Websites ==
- I. Malinovsky on website HfM Carl Maria von Weber Dresden.
- I. Malinovsky on website Euro Music Festival Euro Arts
- Recordings of I.Malinovsky on www.youtube.com
