= Leia Zhu =

British Asian violinist (born 2006)

- Zhu in June 2019
- Born: Leia Zhengying Zhu; October 2006 (age 20); Newcastle upon Tyne, England
- Occupation: Violinist
- Years active: 2010–present
- Website: www.leiazhu.co.uk

Leia Zhengying Zhu (Chinese: 朱蕾雅, born in October 2006) is a British-Chinese violinist. Zhu has performed as a soloist with orchestras including the London Symphony Orchestra, the London Philharmonic Orchestra, and the Philharmonia Orchestra. Her debut album, Camille Saint-Saëns: Complete Concertos was released in 2025.

== Early life and education ==
Leia Zhengying Zhu was born in Newcastle upon Tyne, England to Chinese parents. Zhu studied under Itzhak Rashkovsky and Zakhar Bron.

Zhu attended Fellside Community Primary School in Gateshead, and St Edward's School in Oxford.

== Career ==
Debuting at age four, Zhu's first public performance was at the North East Last Night of the Proms in Newcastle City Hall, with around 2000 people in attendance. She first performed overseas at the age of six in Spain. In 2019, Zhu became the youngest artist to be managed by the London-based artist agency HarrisonParrott at age 12, and the youngest artist-in-residence with the London Mozart Players in October 2021, at age 14.

In August 2021, Zhu performed Camille Saint-Saëns's Introduction and Rondo Capriccioso with the London Symphony Orchestra under Simon Rattle at Trafalgar Square in London. Reviewing the concert for The Guardian, Fiona Maddocks praised Zhu's musical intelligence and command of the work.

In December 2021, she performed a violin solo of "You Raise Me Up" with Westlife, which was livestreamed on WeChat and received 27 million views. Classic FM named Zhu as one of its group of 'Rising Stars 2022' artists. Zhu published an autobiography, Bows, Strings, and Dreams, in October 2023.

In July 2024, Zhu appeared as a violinist at the BBC Proms, participating in the CBeebies Prom Wildlife Jamboree at the Royal Albert Hall. She was shortlisted in the Young Artist Award category at the Royal Philharmonic Society Music Awards and for her debut album was a recipient of the Opus Klassik Young Talent of the Year award in 2025. In November 2025, she performed Sergei Prokofiev's Violin Concerto No. 2 with the London Philharmonic Orchestra under Nodoka Okisawa in Brighton and Eastbourne.

Zhu has been involved in education outreach programmes promoting classical music to adolescents. In April 2026 Zhu was admitted to the Freedom of the City of London. In May 2026, she became a Fellow of the Royal Society of Arts.

== Recordings ==
In February 2025, Zhu released her debut album, Camille Saint-Saëns: Complete Concertos, on Berlin Classics conducted by Howard Griffiths. The album includes Saint-Saëns's first two violin concertos, Introduction and Rondo Capriccioso and Havanaise.

Reviewing the album in BBC Music Magazine, Christopher Dingle awarded it five stars, praising Zhu's technical ability and interpretation of the works. For the recording, Zhu received a 2025 Opus Klassik Young Talent of the Year award.

IIn May 2025, a recording of Tigran Mansurian's Violin Concerto No. 1, featuring Zhu with the Armenian State Symphony Orchestra conducted by Sergey Smbatyan, was released.
