= Zakhar Bron =

Russian violinist (born 1947)

Zakhar Bron Захар Брон
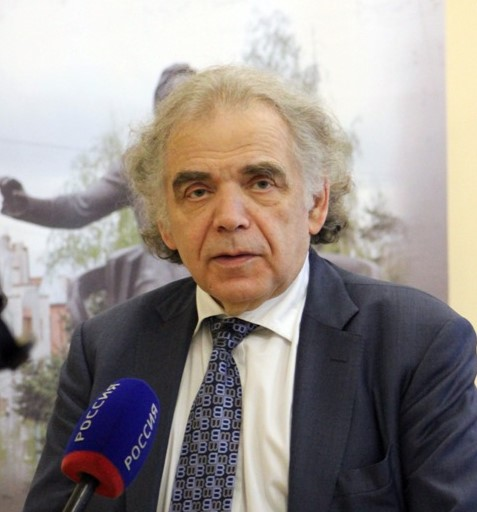
- Bron in 2016

Background information
- Born: 17 December 1947 (age 78); Oral, Kazakh SSR, Soviet Union
- Genre: Classical
- Occupation: Violinist
- Website: zakharbronchamber.com (in German)

Zakhar Nukhimovich Bron (Russian: Захар Нухимович Брон, IPA: [zɐxˈar ˈbron]; born 17 December 1947) is a Soviet and Russian violinist and pedagogue. He has been living in Western Europe since 1989.

== Early life ==
Bron was born in Oral, Kazakhstan, to a Jewish family. His father, Nukhim Zalmanovich Bron, a Polish pianist, and his mother, a Romanian engineering student, fled to the Soviet Union in the 1930s to escape the Nazis and were evacuated with a defence factory from Romanovka, Bessarabia, to Oral during the Great Patriotic War. His first music teacher in his hometown recognized his talent and advised him to attend the Stolyarsky School in Ukrainian Odessa, at the time one of the best violin schools in the USSR, where he lived with a host family and studied under pedagogue Artur Zisserman.

== Education ==
Bron began his formal violin training at the Stolyarsky School in Odessa under Artur Zisserman. He later moved with his father to Moscow, where Boris Goldstein enrolled him in his violin class at the Gnessin Conservatoire and provided private lessons. In 1966, Bron became a student of Igor Oistrakh at the Tchaikovsky Conservatory. After completing his master's studies in 1971, he remained at the conservatory for his post-master's, though this was interrupted by mandatory military service in the Red Army.

== Performing career ==
As a violinist, Bron achieved recognition in international competitions. In 1971, he was a laureate (12th prize) at the Queen Elisabeth Competition in Brussels. In 1977, he shared the 3rd prize with American violinist Peter Zazofsky at International Henryk Wieniawski Violin Competition in Poland.

== Teaching career ==
Bron's primary achievements are tied to his pedagogical work, which began in 1974 at the Novosibirsk Conservatory, where he taught before gaining recognition. His early students included Daniel Hope and Vadim Repin. In 1989, Bron moved with his family and students—Vadim Repin, Maxim Vengerov, Nikolay Madoyan, and Natalia Prischepenko—to Lübeck, Germany, where he became a professor at the Lübeck Academy of Music. There, he also taught Vadim Gluzman and David Garrett. Other notable students from his teaching career include Gwendolyn Masin, Mari Silje Samuelsen, Priya Mitchell, Igor Malinovsky, Alexandre Da Costa, Denis Goldfeld, Daishin Kashimoto, Tamaki Kawakubo, Mayuko Kamio, Mayu Kishima, Soyoung Yoon, Christoph Seybold, Sayaka Shoji,, Gia Jashvili, Hadar Rimon, Leia Zhu, and Ellinor D'Melon.

Bron has held professorships at several prestigious institutions, including the Royal Academy of Music in London, Codarts in Rotterdam, the Lübeck Academy of Music, the Kronberg Academy, and the Reina Sofía School of Music in Madrid, where he currently teaches. He became a professor at the Cologne University of Music in 1997 and at the Zurich University of the Arts in 2002. He is also an honorary professor at conservatoires in Japan, Poland, Bulgaria, and other countries. In 2010, he founded his own school for musically gifted children in Switzerland. Bron primarily works in Western Europe and Japan.

== Controversy ==
Bron has attracted controversy because of accusations that violin competitions have unduly favoured his students with awards. In February 2018, Fabio Luisi resigned as chairman of the 2018 Paganini Competition, in protest at his perceived imposition of judges such as Bron by the Italian cultural official Elisa Serafini.
