= Kenneth Renshaw =

American concert violinist

Kenneth Renshaw is an American concert violinist.

Renshaw was born in San Francisco to Kerrilyn, a concert pianist and piano teacher, and Curtis Renshaw, a concert guitarist, in October 1993. When he was four, Kenneth started taking violin lessons on a 1/16 size violin. He attended Crowden Music School middle school and later Ruth Asawa San Francisco School of the Arts for high school. From 2008 to 2010, he was the concertmaster of the San Francisco Symphony Youth Orchestra and made his solo debut in Davies Symphony Hall as winner of the orchestra's concerto competition in 2010.

In 2012 he won first place in the Yehudi Menuhin International Competition for Young Violinists in Beijing. He first attended the New England Conservatory for the first two years of his college education and is a senior at Juilliard in New York. His teachers include Li Lin, Itzhak Perlman, Donald Weilerstein, and Midori Goto. He has been loaned violins from the Stradivari Society of Chicago. He was also one of 12 finalists in the 2015 Queen Elisabeth Competition in Brussels.
