= Tasmin Little =

British violinist (born 1965)

Tasmin Elizabeth Little (born 13 May 1965) is an English classical violinist. She is a concerto soloist and also performs as a recitalist and chamber musician. She has released numerous albums, winning the Critics Award at the Classic Brit Awards in 2011 for her recording of Elgar's Violin Concerto.

== Early life and education ==
Little was born in London and is the daughter of Bradford-born actor George Little, best known for his role in Emmerdale Farm. She first learned to read music at age six while learning to play a recorder that her mother had given her. She grew up in northwest London, attending the Yehudi Menuhin School on a scholarship as a weekly boarder between the ages of 8 and 18; among her fellow pupils was violinist Nigel Kennedy.

In 1982 she was a finalist in the string section of BBC Young Musician of the Year. After leaving school she went on to the Guildhall School of Music and Drama, where she obtained a Performance Diploma and won the Gold Medal in the school's annual music competition in 1986.

She is known for her presence at the Menuhin Competition for Young Violinists, both as a competitor in its early days and as a member of the competition jury in recent years. She was the third prize winner in the Senior Division at the inaugural 1983 competition in Folkestone, after which she earned second prize at the following competition in 1985.

== Career ==
Little's first professional performance as a soloist was in 1988 with The Hallé. She made her first appearance at the BBC Proms in 1990, and has appeared regularly since. Over the course of her career Little has performed with the Royal Philharmonic Orchestra, London Symphony Orchestra, Royal Liverpool Philharmonic, the New York Philharmonic and other major orchestras, and has released over 20 albums.

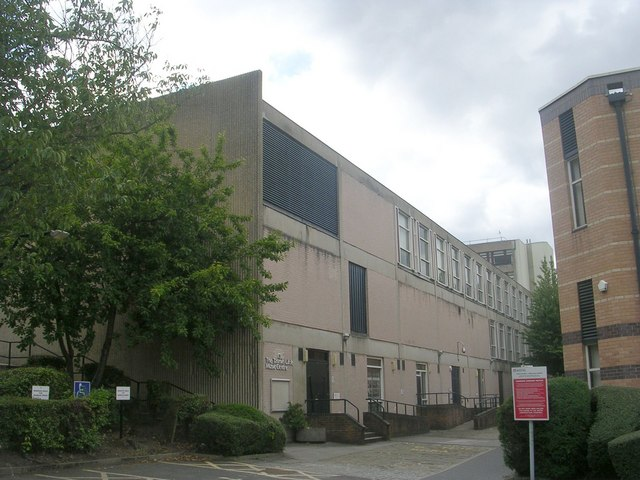
The Tasmin Little Music Centre at the University of Bradford

Little has been an exponent of the works of composer Frederick Delius throughout her career, and was the artistic director of "Delius Inspired", an eight-day festival held in Bradford in July 2006 celebrating his work which was broadcast on BBC Radio 3. She has also made a documentary about Delius for BBC Two.

In 2008 Little released a three-track recording, The Naked Violin, as a free download from her website in a move aimed at making classical music more accessible. The recording featured Bach's Partita No. 3 in E major, Eugène Ysaÿe's Sonata No.3 in D minor, and "Luslawice" by Paul Patterson, all performed unaccompanied. The project won the 2008 Gramophone/Classic FM Award for Audience Innovation, and was featured in an episode of The South Bank Show.

Little received an honorary doctorate from the University of Bradford in 1996, and the University's music school, the Tasmin Little Music Centre, is named after her. In 2009 she received a British Academy of Songwriters, Composers and Authors Gold Badge Award, and in 2011 her album Elgar: Violin Concerto won the Critics Award at the Classic Brit Awards. She was appointed Officer of the Order of the British Empire (OBE) in the 2012 Birthday Honours for services to music.

On 24 January 2020, Little announced her retirement from the concert platform for the summer of 2020, which was deferred to the end of 2020 due to the coronavirus pandemic.

She was appointed Commander of the Order of the British Empire (CBE) in the 2023 Birthday Honours for services to music.
