= Stephen Waarts =

Dutch American violinist (born 1996)

- Born: July 15, 1996 (age 30); Bay Area, California
- Occupation: Violinist
- Instrument: Violin
- Works: Alpha Classics: Mozart Violin Concerto No.1 with Camerata Schweiz; Kammermusik No. 4
- Awards: 2014 Yehudi Menuhin International Competition for Young Violinists; 2019 International Classical Music Awards Orchestra Award; 2017 Avery Fisher Career Grant
- Website: https://stephenwaarts.com

Stephen Waarts (born July 15, 1996) is a Dutch American violinist. He was the first prize winner in the senior division of the 2014 Yehudi Menuhin International Competition for Young Violinists in Austin, Texas. He was also the fifth prize winner of the 2015 Queen Elisabeth Competition in Brussels, Belgium.

== Life and career ==
Born in America, with a twin brother and younger sister, Waarts began his violin studies at age 5 and piano studies at age 8, with Krishnabai Lewis and Jenny Rudin, starting with Suzuki violin lessons. At 14, Waarts simultaneously graduated high school and the San Francisco Conservatory Preparatory Division studying with Li Lin and was accepted at the Curtis Institute of Music in Philadelphia, Pennsylvania, where he was a student under Aarond Rosand since 2010. Waarts was also a student of Itzhak Perlman at the Perlman Music Program and currently studies at Kronberg Academy as a student of Mihaela Martin. He also studied piano with Annie Petit, while pursuing his Bachelor of Music degree.

Waarts has performed at venues like Weimar Hall in Germany, Moscow State University, Teatro Gayarre in Spain, Oslo Conservatory, Carnegie Hall, Herbst Theater in San Francisco, Ford Amphitheater in Los Angeles, and Field Concert Hall in Philadelphia. He has also performed with San Francisco Chamber Orchestra, Cleveland Orchestra, Austin Symphony, Berlin Konzerthaus Orchester, Szczecin Philharmonic, hr-Sinfonieorchester, Munich Philharmonic, Kansas City Symphony, Israel Philharmonic Orchestra, BBC Scottish Symphony Orchestra, and Lucerne Symphony Orchestra He also released an album in 2018 with pianist Gabriele Carcano featuring works by Schumann and Bartók and released another one in 2020 called Hindemith Kammermusik nr. 4, after Kammermusik No. 4.

Waarts has played on violins such as an 1868 Jean-Baptiste Vuillaume and a c.1750 Pietro Guarneri of Venice violin, on loan through the Stradivari Society with bows made by Dominique Peccatte.

== Awards and appearances ==
- 2010: Second prize, junior division, Yehudi Menuhin International Competition for Young Violinists
- 2010: First prize, Junior division, International Louis Spohr Competition for Young Violinists
- 2010: Prize winner, Khuner Young Artists Concerto Competition
- 2011: Prize winner, Sarasate Competition
- 2013: Second prize, Montreal International Competition
- 2013: Audience prize, Montreal International Competition
- 2014: First prize, senior division, Yehudi Menuhin International Competition for Young Violinists
- 2015: Fifth prize, Queen Elisabeth Competition
- 2017: Recipient, Avery Fisher Career Grant
- 2019: Orchestra Award, International Classical Music Awards
- 2020: Carnegie Hall Debut at Zankel Hall
