= Ilya Gringolts =

Violinist and educator

Ilya Alexandrovich Gringolts (Russian: Илья Александрович Грингольц; born 2 July 1982) is a Russian violinist and educator.

== Early life and studies ==
Born in Leningrad, Gringolts studied violin in St. Petersburg with Tatiana Liberova and Jeanna Metallidi. He then attended the Juilliard School, and studied violin with Itzhak Perlman for 3 years. From 2001 to 2003, Gringolts was a member of the BBC Radio 3 New Generation Artists programme.

== Career ==
In addition to the modern violin performance genre, he has a continued commitment to period-instrument performance.

He founded the Gringolts Quartet in 2008 and plays first violin in the quartet.

Gringolts is currently on the music faculty of the Zürcher Hochschule der Künste.

Gringolts has made commercial recordings for such labels as Onyx and Deutsche Grammophon.

Gringolts plays the violin “ex Kiesewetter” by Antonio Stradivari, a loan from the Stradivari Society, Chicago. Previously, Gringolts played the "ex-Prové" Stradivarius violin, loaned to him by a private donor.

== Personal life ==
Since the Russian invasion of Ukraine, he has been living in exile in Zurich. Much of his family continues to live in Saint Petersburg, but his parents have fled Russia.

Gringolts is married to the Armenian violinist Anahit Kurtikyan, who also plays in the Gringolts Quartet. The couple has three daughters. His sister, Olga, is married to the violinist, Maxim Vengerov.

== Awards and prizes ==
- 1992: All-Russian Junior Competition, Second Prize
- 1994: International Youth Competition in St. Petersburg, First Prize
- 1995: Yehudi Menuhin International Competition for Young Violinists, Junior Division, Sixth Prize
- 1997: Henryk Wieniawski Violin Competition, Junior Division, Laureate
- 1998: Paganini Competition in Genoa, Italy: First Prize
- 2001-2003: BBC New Generation Artist
- 2006: Gramophone Award for Chamber Music, recording of chamber music of the Sergei Taneyev Piano Quintet with Vadim Repin, Nobuko Imai, Lynn Harrell, and Mikhail Pletnev.
