= Joji Hattori =

Japanese violinist and conductor (born 1969)

- Born: January 21, 1969 (age 57); Tokyo, Japan
- Other name: 服部譲二
- Occupation: violinist

Joji Hattori (服部 譲二, Hattori Jōji; born January 21, 1969 in Tokyo) is a Japanese violinist and conductor.

== Biography ==
Born in Japan but raised in Vienna, Joji Hattori studied violin at the Vienna Academy of Music and sociology at St. Antony's College, Oxford University, and furthered his violin studies with violinists Yehudi Menuhin and Vladimir Spivakov. Joji Hattori's international soloist career started after winning the Yehudi Menuhin International Competition for Young Violinists in 1989. In 1999 Hattori decided to start a conducting career and in 2002 won a prize at the Maazel-Vilar Conductor's Competition which led to conducting engagements in New York.

Since has been Principal Resident Conductor of the Erfurt Theater, music director of the Tokyo Ensemble and since 2004 he has been Associate Conductor of the Das Wiener KammerOrchester. He has been invited to conduct many major orchestras including the Philharmonia Orchestra, Vienna Symphony Orchestra and the orchestra of the Vienna State Opera.

Hattori is a Visiting Professor of violin at the Royal Academy of Music in London.
