= Guido Sant'Anna =

Brazilian violin soloist

Guido Sant'Anna (born June 28, 2005) is a Brazilian violin soloist. He achieved international acclaim in 2022 as the first South American violinist to win the prestigious International Fritz Kreisler Competition. His victory in Vienna followed another historic milestone in 2018, when he became the first Brazilian violinist invited to the Yehudi Menuhin International Competition for Young Violinists in Geneva, where he won both the Audience Prize and the Chamber Music Award. These accomplishments earned him a place on Forbes Brazil's "30 under 30" list in 2022.

== Early life ==
Sant’Anna was born in 2005 in São Paulo, Brazil. He began violin lessons at the age of five, and made his orchestral debut at seven under the baton of Júlio Medaglia. At eight, he was a finalist in the Prelúdio Competition, promoted by TV Cultura, São Paulo. He has been a Cultura Artística scholar since 2012, studying under his tutor Elisa Fukuda. His further distinctions include the Graded Outreach Program scholarship at the American School of São Paulo and his participation in the Perlman Music Program in 2018–19. In 2021, he won the Young Soloists Competition of the São Paulo State Symphony Orchestra, and in 2022, he received the Grand Prix from CONCERTO Magazine.

== Early career ==
Sant’Anna has performed as a soloist with prominent orchestras in Brazil and internationally. He has established a strong connection with the São Paulo State Symphony and Minas Gerais Philharmonic orchestras, becoming familiar to local audiences. In October 2022, he replaced Christian Tetzlaff in São Paulo with the Deutsche Kammerphilharmonie Bremen, play-conducting Brahms' violin concerto to critical acclaim. For his winning performance at the Fritz Kreisler International Competition, he played with the ORF Radio-Symphonieorchester Wien under Alexander Joel at the Musikverein. His past collaborations include performances with the Emirates Youth Symphony Orchestra, the Municipal Symphony Orchestra of São Paulo, and the Symphony Orchestra of the Municipal Theater of Rio de Janeiro, featuring works by Tchaikovsky, Beethoven, and Ravel. His recital appearances span the United Kingdom, Germany, Austria, Switzerland, Cyprus, Brazil, and Paraguay.

== Performances ==
In June 2023, Sant’Anna made his highly anticipated debut at the Rheingau Musik Festival with the Frankfurt Radio Symphony under the direction of Alain Altinoglu, performing Édouard Lalo's Symphonie espagnole. Following this, he performed Mendelssohn's Violin Concerto in his hometown with the São Paulo State Symphony Orchestra, conducted by Thierry Fischer. These performances marked his debut recording project for the Naxos Records label. In the autumn of 2023, Sant’Anna made his Asian debut, embarking on a recital tour in South Korea. In the spring of 2025, he will join the Neojibá Youth Orchestra of Bahia on a European tour, performing alongside soloists Lucas and Arthur Jussen under the direction of Ricardo Castro.

== Instruments ==
Guido plays a violin made in 1874 by Jean-Baptiste Vuillaume, generously loaned by luthier Marcel Richters. He has been supported by the KD SCHMID Fellowship Scheme since May 2023 and the arteMusica-Stiftung. Since 2023, he has been studying at Kronberg Academy with Mihaela Martin, with his studies funded by the Margareta and Steffen Rabus patronage.
