= Diana Adamyan =

Armenian violinist

Diana Adamyan Դիանա Ադամյան
- Diana in 2019

Background information
- Born: Diana Hakobi Adamyan; March 7, 2000 (age 26); Yerevan, Armenia
- Genre: Classical
- Occupation: Violinist
- Instrument: Violin
- Website: dianaadamyanviolin.com

Diana Hakobi Adamyan (Note: Armenian: Դիանա Հակոբի Ադամյան, romanized: Diana Hakobi Adamyan) (born 7 March 2000) is an Armenian violinist who won the first prize in the Senior Division of the Menuhin International Competition in 2018. In 2020, she also won the Khachaturian Violin Competition which was held online due the COVID-19 pandemic.

== Early life ==
Diana Hakobi Adamyan was born on 7 March 2000, in Yerevan, Armenia into a family of musicians. Both her father and her mother were professional violinists with the Armenian Philharmonic Orchestra. She began studying the violin when she was five before studying at the Tchaikovsky Music School in Yerevan, where she was trained with Petros Haykazyan.

She made her debut at nine years old, which she performed Max Bruch's Violin Concerto No. 1 with the Armenian Philharmonic Orchestra. Adamyan later studied at the Komitas State Conservatory of Yerevan and completed her education at the University of Music and Performing Arts Munich with Ana Chumachenco.

== Career ==
Adamyan started getting popular through performances in violin competitions. In 2015, she won second prize at the International Tchaikovsky Competition held in Novosibirsk. In April 2018, at the age of 18, Adamyan won first prize in the Senior Division of the Menuhin Competition in Geneva ,playing a violin made by Urs Mächler in 1990. She then was awarded the CIS Commonwealth of Debuts prize. In 2020, she won first prize at the 16th Khachaturian International Competition.

In 2015, she got an invitation from Pinchas Zukerman and participated in summer classes at the National Arts Centre and performed Johann Sebastian Bach's Concerto for Two Violins with Zukerman and the Royal Philharmonic Orchestra at Cadogan Hall in London.

== Personal life ==
Adamyan had a Gagliano made in 1760, given from Henri Moerel Foundation.
