= Stella Chen (violinist) =

American violinist (born 1992)

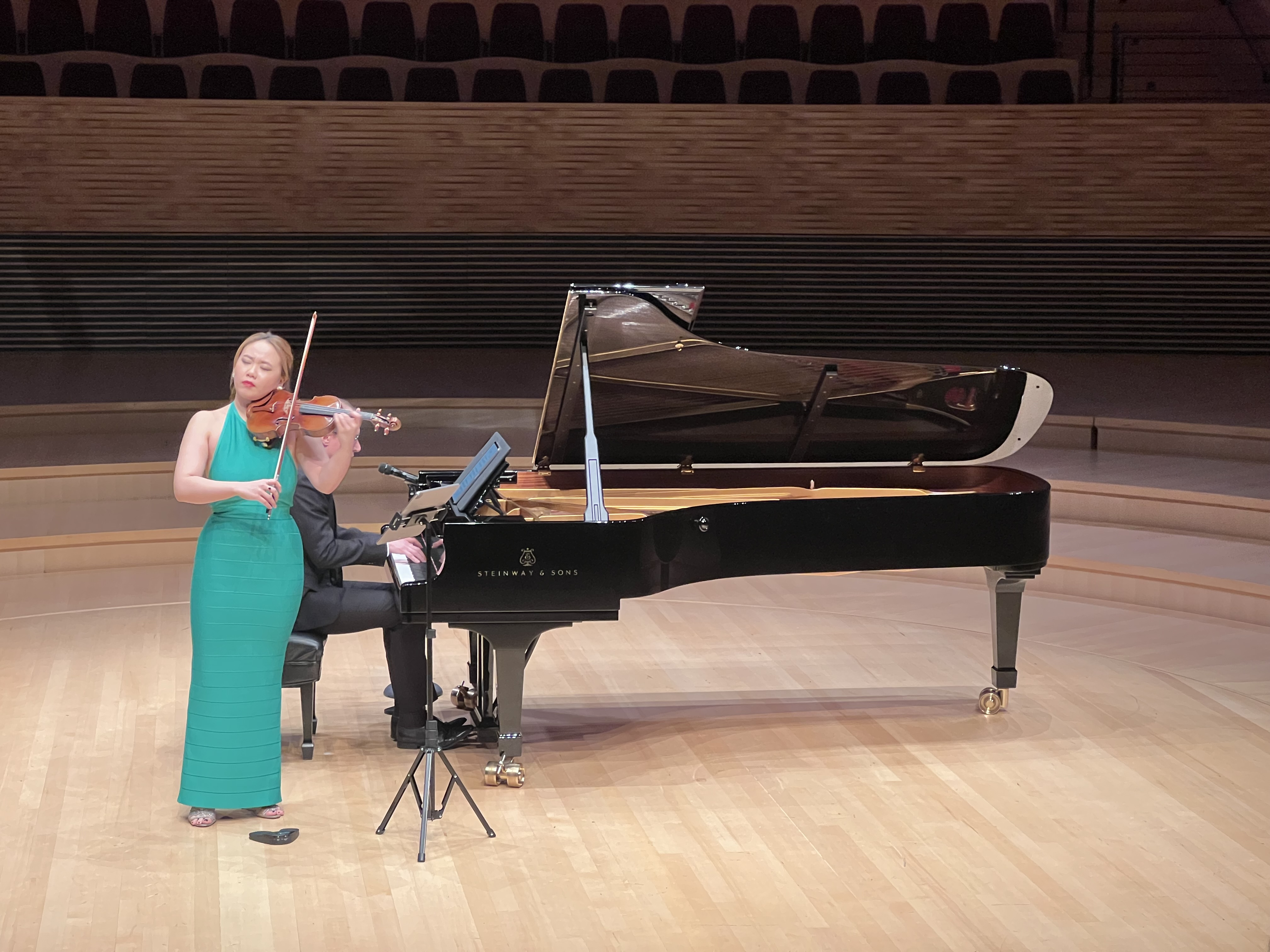
- Chen performing at the Bing Concert Hall, Stanford (2025)

Background information
- Born: 1992 (age 33–34)
- Genre: Classical
- Occupation: Violinist
- Instrument: 1700 ex-Petri Stradivarius
- Website: stellachen.com

Stella Chen (born 1992) is an American violinist. She was the first prize winner of the Queen Elisabeth Competition in Brussels, Belgium in 2019; won the Avery Fisher Career Grant in 2020; and was named the Young Artist of the Year, Gramophone Classical Music Awards in 2023.

== Biography ==
Chen is a graduate of Harvard University (BA, psychology), the Juilliard School, and the New England Conservatory of Music, where she earned a master's degree. She studied at Juilliard under Itzhak Perlman, Donald Weilerstein, Li Lin and Catherine Cho (DMA 2021). From 2019 to 2023 she studied at the Kronberg Academy with Mihaela Martin.

Chen performed as soloist with the New York Philharmonic and the Chicago Symphony and appeared in venues such as Carnegie Hall, Lincoln Center, Vienna's Musikverein and Berliner Philharmonie. She plays chamber music with Perlman, Weilerstein, and Robert Levin.

From 2019 to 2023, Chen played the 'Huggins' 1708 Stradivarius violin loaned from the Nippon Music Foundation and plays the 1700 ex-Petri Stradivarius on loan from Ryuji Ueno and Rare Violins In Consortium, Artists and Benefactors Collaborative.

In 2025, Chen joined the violin faculty of the Juilliard School.

== Awards ==
- 2006: Fifth prize, junior division, Yehudi Menuhin International Competition for Young Violinists, Boulogne-sur-Mer, France
- 2008: Fourth prize, senior division, Yehudi Menuhin International Competition for Young Violinists, Cardiff, Wales
- 2015: Recipient, Robert Levin Prize, Harvard University
- 2017: Second prize Winner, Tibor Varga International Violin Competition
- 2019: First prize, Queen Elisabeth Competition, Brussels, Belgium
- 2020: Recipient, Lincoln Center Emerging Artist Award
- 2020: Recipient, Avery Fisher Career Grant
- 2023: Recipient, Young Artist of the Year, Gramophone Classical Music Awards

== Discography ==
- 2023 Stella X Schubert
- 2026 Stella Chen, Academy of St Martin in the Fields and Jean-Jacques Kantorow - Beethoven & Barber: Violin Concertos
