= Chen Jiafeng =

Chinese violinist (born 1987)

Jiafeng Chen
- Born: Chen Jiafeng; April 13, 1987 (age 39); Shanghai, China
- Genre: Classical
- Occupation: Musician
- Instrument: Violin
- Website: http://jiafengchen.com/

Chen Jiafeng (born April 13, 1987) (Chinese: 陈佳峰) is a Chinese violinist. He was the first prize winner in the 2003 International Competition for Young Violinists K. Lipinski and H. Wieniawski, the second prize winner of the 2008 International Yehudi Menuhin Violin Competition and the second prize of the International Jean Sibelius Violin Competition in Helsinki.

== Career ==
Born in Shanghai, Chen started learning violin at the age of three, while his teacher Zhang Shixiang wrote a violin textbook based on the experience of tutoring him. His violin teachers were Peter Shixiang Zhang, Jiyang Zhao and Lei Fang. He attended the primary and middle schools affiliated to the Shanghai Conservatory of Music and then Chetham's School of Music in Manchester, United Kingdom. He holds a Bachelor of Music Degree (with honours) from the Royal College of Music in London, and a Master of Music Degree from Juilliard School in New York City.

Chen teaches at the Chetham's School of Music, Royal College of Music and the Royal Birmingham Conservatoire. He is the music director of the Jiafeng Chen Music Studio which holds music summer courses in the world's leading cities since 2015.

Chen is a top prize winner of several major violin competitions. He won 1st prize at the International Competition for Young Violinists K. Lipinski and H. Wieniawski in Lublin with further prizes from the European Union Music Competition and the Frederic Chopin Academy of Music, 2nd Prizes at The International Jean Sibelius Violin Competition in Helsinki, the Yehudi Menuhin International Competition for Young Violinists in Cardiff and the Windsor International String Competition in Windsor. Chen is also a Laureate of the Queen Elisabeth Music Competition. Further more, he was awarded the Paganini Prize at the Indianapolis International Violin Competition.

The centuries-old Worshipful Company of Musicians in UK awarded him a special Medal for his outstanding achievements and contributions during his studies at the Royal College of Music graduation ceremony. After his studies, he was appointed a violin professor at the Royal College of Music, and he also teaches at the Royal Birmingham Conservatoire.

Jiafeng Chen's career as a soloist has taken him to all six continents. He has been heard as a soloist with the Finnish Radio Symphony Orchestra, Hallé Orchestra, Helsinki Philharmonic Orchestra, Opera National de Nancy, Orchestre Royal de Chambre de Wallonie, Philharmonia Orchestra (U.K.) amongst others and at concert halls including the Finlandia Hall, Wigmore Hall, Royal Albert Hall and Carnegie Hall. He has collaborated with violinists David Chan and Cho-Liang Lin; cellists Nan-Cheng Chen and Gary Hoffman; and conductors Paavo Berglund, Paul Goodwin, Lorin Maazel, Paolo Olmi, Petri Sakari, John Storgårds and Gilbert Varga. He has performed solo concerts at Beijing International Chamber Music Festival broadcast by CCTV Music Channel, Shanghai Spring International Music Festival, Lake District Summer Music, BBC Proms in UK broadcast by BBC Radio 3, Verbier Festival in Switzerland broadcast by France Musique, Valdres Sommersymfoni in Norway, La Jolla Music Society SummerFest in USA, opening gala of the Menuhin Violin Competition, and performed as guest concertmaster with the City of Birmingham Symphony Orchestra. He was praised as "not only technically brilliant but also subtle, deeply felt and astonishingly mature" (Nottingham Evening Post) and "surged forward while remaining classically poised" (BBC).

Jiafeng Chen's artistry has also supported humanitarian causes. After he heard the earthquake in Sichuan in 2008, he organised many recitals in the UK and Italy where raised over £4800 to support the students from Sichuan as scholarships. He also performed at fundraising events organised by the British Red Cross. English National Opera, Dance Umbrella International Festival and the Royal College of Music. In 2019, he went to South Africa with the Royal Birmingham Conservatoire as part of the "ARCO" music education project to help the students there.

Jiafeng Chen studied with Peter Shixiang Zhang, Jiyang Zhao and Lei Fang, Ronald Copes and Cho-Liang Lin at the Primary and Middle Schools Affiliated to Shanghai Conservatory of Music, Chetham's School of Music, the Royal College of Music London (first-class BMus honours) and The Juilliard School.

Jiafeng Chen plays a Nicolo Gagliano violin (Naples, 1751) kindly on loan from a generous group of owners.

== Awards ==
- 1995 2nd prize, Shanghai "Yi-Fu" Cup (Chinese: 逸夫杯) Violin Competition
- 2001 2nd prize, 7th National Youth Violin Competition, China.
- 2003 1st prize, 9th International Wieniawski Violin Competition with further prizes from the European Union Music Competition and the Frederic Chopin Academy of Music, Poland.
- 2004 3rd prize, 4th International Novosibirsk Youth Violin Competition, Russia.
- 2004 Manoug Parikian Award, Musicians Benevolent Fund String Award 2004, United Kingdom.
- 2005 Runner-up & the Most Promising under 18 Quartet, National Youth String Quartet Competition, United Kingdom.
- 2005 Winner, Concerto Competition at Chetham's School of Music, Manchester, U.K.
- 2005 2nd prize, 9th International Jean Sibelius Violin Competition, Finland.
- 2006 Education Award, Musicians Benevolent Fund String Award 2006, United Kingdom.
- 2008 2nd Prize, 13th Menuhin International Violin Competition for Youth, Cardiff, United Kingdom.
- 2008 Winner, Concerto Competition, Royal College of Music, London, U.K.
- 2009 Laureate, Queen Elisabeth International Violin Competition, Brussels, Belgium
- 2010 3rd Prize for the Performance of Caprices by N. Paganini, Indianapolis International Violin Competition, Indianapolis, USA
- 2010 Worshipful Company of Musicians Silver Medal
- 2010 Winner, Yamaha Music Foundation of Europe Scholarship
- 2011 2nd Prize, The 3rd Windsor International String Competition, Windsor Castle, U.K.
