= Daishin Kashimoto =

Japanese violinist (born 1979)

Daishin Kashimoto 樫本 大進
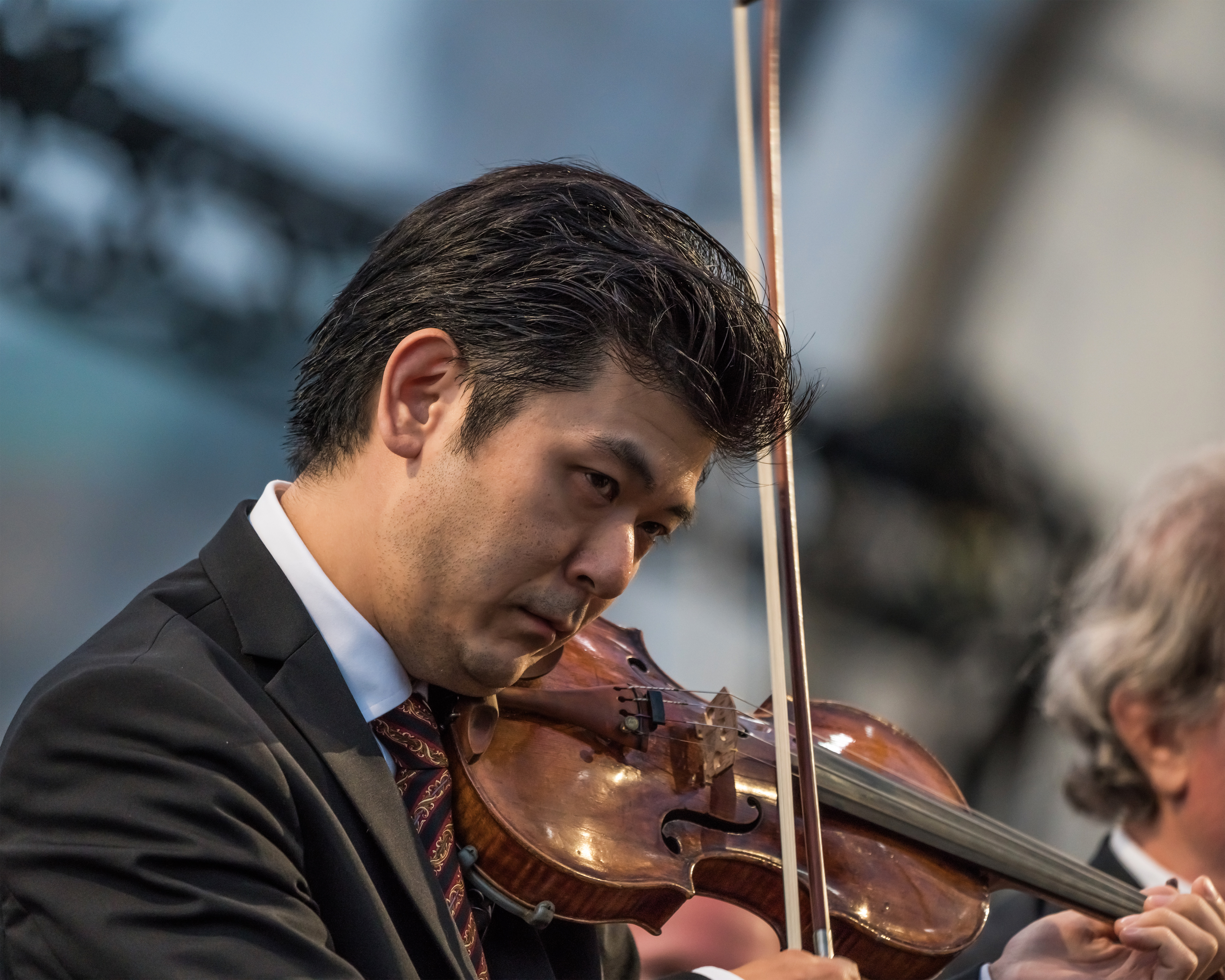
- Kashimoto in 2019, performing with the BPO at the Brandenburg Gate, Berlin

Background information
- Born: 27 March 1979 (age 47); London
- Genres: Classical
- Occupation: Violinist
- Instrument: Violin
- Years active: 1988–present
- Label: Sony Classical Records

Daishin Kashimoto (樫本 大進; Kashimoto Daishin; born 27 March 1979) is a Japanese classical violinist. Since 2009, he has been the first concertmaster of the Berlin Philharmonic.

Kashimoto is fluent in speaking and writing in Japanese, English and German. He married Ria Ideta, also a musician, in 2008.

== Early life ==
Kashimoto was born on 27 March 1979 in London, United Kingdom. At age three, he began studying violin in Tokyo, at the inspiration of his mother, a former piano teacher. He moved to New York and was accepted at the age of seven by the pre-college division of Juilliard School as its youngest student and received the Edward John Noble Foundation Scholarship.

At age 11, Kashimoto then moved to Lübeck, Germany, to study with the rigid perfectionist, Professor Zakhar Bron who helped hone his skills at the Musikhochschule Lübeck (Lübeck Academy of Music).

Desiring more musical freedom at age 20, Kashimoto moved to Freiburg to continue his studies with Professor Rainer Kussmaul, former concertmaster of the Berlin Philharmonic, at the Staatliche Hochschule für Musik, from which he graduated in 2005.

In 2009 at age 30, Kashimoto was offered the position as concertmaster of the Berlin Philharmonic Orchestra, training for six months (rather than two years) and obtaining 2/3rds of the orchestra members vote before getting officially hired.

== Career ==
Daishin gave his first recital in 1988, and in the same year he made his first appearance as a soloist with the New York Symphonic Ensemble. Since then, he has given recitals and solo appearances in major cities of USA, the Far East and in many European countries. He has performed with many internationally renowned orchestras, including the State Symphony Orchestra of Russia, St. Petersburg Philharmonic, Radio Symphony Orchestras of Cologne, Frankfurt and Moscow, Orchestre National de France, Orchestre de la Suisse Romande, Czech Philharmonic, Bamberger Symphoniker, Vienna and Berlin Symphony Orchestras, NHK Symphony Orchestra, Boston Symphony, under the baton of such conductors as Mariss Jansons, Semyon Bychkov, Michel Plasson, Vladimir Fedosseyev, Hugh Wolff, Evgeny Svetlanov, Yehudi Menuhin, Marek Janowski, Heinz Holliger, Seiji Ozawa, Lorin Maazel, Heinrich Schiff, Charles Dutoit, Jiri Kout, Simon Rattle, Myung-Whun Chung and Yury Temirkanov.

Since 2009, he has been the first concertmaster of the Berlin Philharmonic.

He has regularly performed with such artists as Yury Bashmet, Konstantin Lifsсhitz, Myung-Whun Chung, Itamar Golan, Claudio Bohórquez, Yefim Bronfman, Shlomo Mintz, Tabea Zimmermann, Paul Meyer, Antoine Tamestit, Jian Wang, Eric Le Sage, Mischa Maisky, Jing Zhao, and many others.

In 1999 Daishin Kashimoto signed a worldwide recording contract with Sony Classical and has released sonata CDs with Itamar Golan and the Brahms concerto CD with the Dresdner Staatskapelle and Myung-Whun Chung. He currently plays on the 1744 Guarneri Del Gesù "The Bériot".

== Awards ==
- Sixth Yehudi Menuhin International Competition for Young Violinists in England, 1993 (First Prize)
- The International Competition for Violinists Cologne, 1994
- International Fritz Kreisler Competition in Vienna (Youngest winner, 1996)
- Long-Thibaud-Crespin Competition, Paris
- The Steigenberger Prize
- The Davidoff Prize, 1994
