= Mayuko Kamio =

Japanese violinist (born 1986)

Mayuko Kamio 神尾 真由子
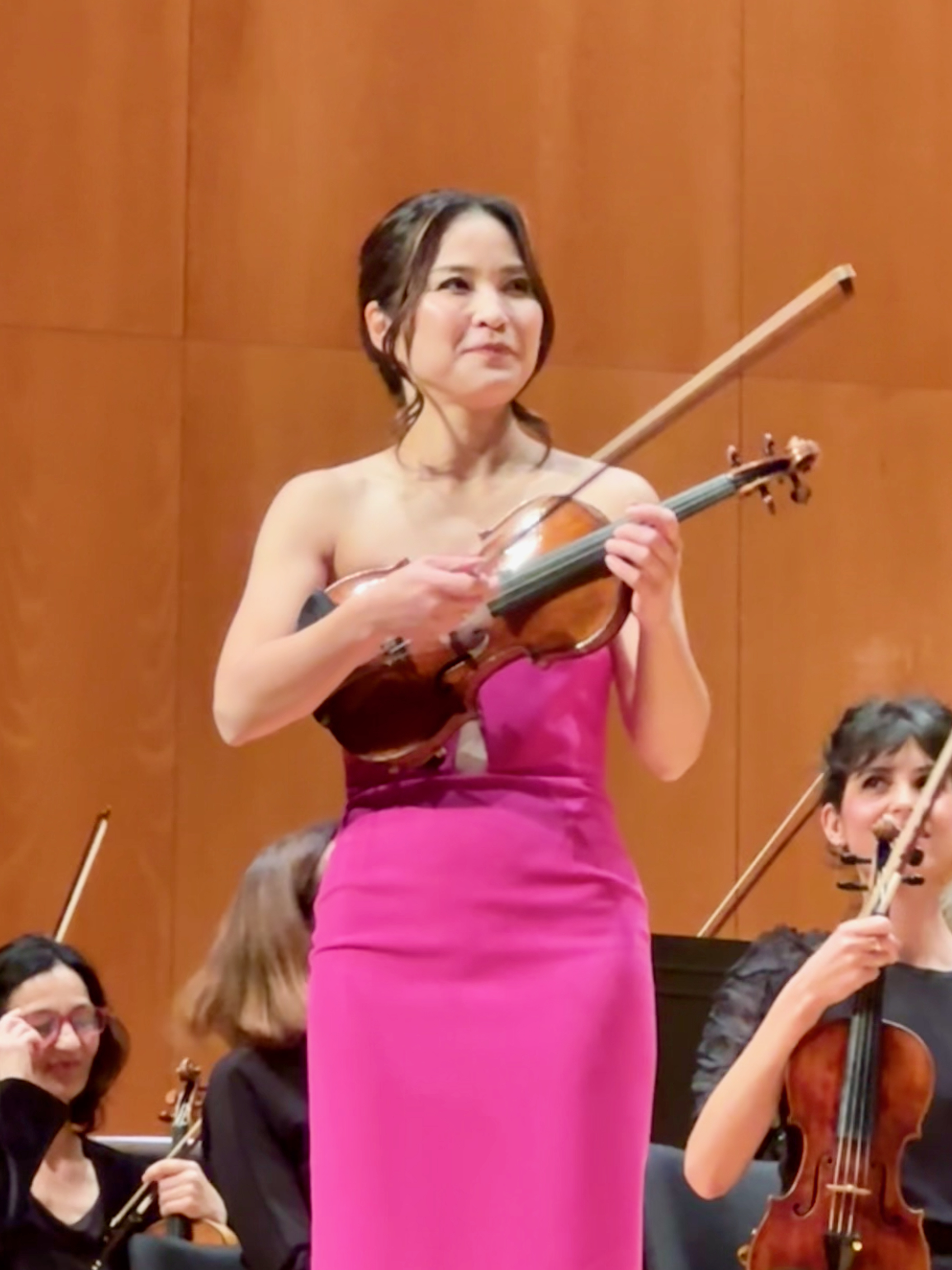
- Kamio in 2024

Background information
- Born: June 12, 1986; Osaka, Japan
- Occupation: Musician
- Instrument: Violin
- Website: mayuko-kamio.com

Mayuko Kamio (神尾 真由子, born June 12, 1986, in Toyonaka, Osaka) is a Japanese violinist. She won the First Prize at the International Tchaikovsky Competition in 2007, the Young Concert Artists International Auditions in 2000, and was the youngest prize winner at the International Yehudi Menuhin Violin Competition in 1998.

== Early life ==
Kamio was born in Osaka, Japan in 1986, and began to play the violin at the age of four. Her early teachers were Chikako Satoya, Machie Oguri and Chihiro Kudo, and she worked with Koichiro Harada at the Toho Gakuen School of Music. Kamio studied in the U.S. with Dorothy DeLay and Masao Kawasaki at the Aspen Music Festival and the pre-college division of the Juilliard School, and with Zakhar Bron at the Zurich University of the Arts.

== Career ==
Kamio was one of three people (along with pianist Adam Neiman and Young Concert Artists manager Susan Wadsworth) who were the subjects of the 2003 documentary film Playing for Real, directed by Josh Aronson. The film documents the difficulties in establishing a career in classical music.

In 2010, Kamio toured Japan with the Budapest Festival Orchestra under Iván Fischer playing the Mendelssohn Violin Concerto. On 2 October 2010, she played Fantasía sobre Carmen de Sarasate in Buenos Aires, Argentina.

Kamio has appeared with renowned orchestras including the Israel Philharmonic Orchestra, Munich Philharmonic, Tonhalle-Orchester Zürich, SWR Symphonieorchester Stuttgart, BBC Symphony Orchestra, NHK Symphony Orchestra, Budapest Festival Orchestra, Orchestre Philharmonique de Monte Carlo, Orchestre National de Lille, Russian National Orchestra, BBC Philharmonic, and the Seattle Symphony among others. She has also collaborated with conductors such as Zubin Mehta, Mstislav Rostropovich, Yehudi Menuhin, Vladimir Ashkenazy, Charles Dutoit, Iván Fischer, François-Xavier Roth, Jiri Belohlavek and Ludovic Morlot.
