= Lena Neudauer =

German violinist

Lena Neudauer (born 1984) is a German violinist.

== Life ==
Born in Munich, Neudauer started playing the violin at the age of 3. She first took lessons with Helge Thelen and later with Sonja Korkeala. At the age of 11, she attended the Mozarteum University Salzburg and studied with Thomas Zehetmair and finally with Christoph Poppen. Already at the age of 15, Neudauer won the 4th International Violin Competition Leopold Mozart in Augsburg in 1999 (Mozart Prize – 1st Prize). In 2013 she was a member of the jury at the 8th edition of the same competition.

In 2010, she was appointed professor for violin at the Hochschule für Musik Saar in Saarbrücken. Since the winter semester 2016, she has held a professorship for violin at the University of Music and Performing Arts Munich.

She owes much of the inspiration for her artistic work to her collaboration with Felix Andrievsky, Ana Chumachenco, Midori Gotō, Nobuko Imai and Seiji Ozawa. As a soloist she played with orchestras like the Münchener Kammerorchester, the Orchestre National de Belgique, the Polnischen Kammerphilharmonie, the Nürnberger Symphoniker, the Brandenburger Symphoniker and the Münchner Symphoniker and under the direction of conductors such as Dennis Russell Davies, Mariss Jansons, Christoph Poppen and Wojciech Rajski.

== Prizes-awards ==
- 1999: 4th International Violin Competition Leopold Mozart in Augsburg (Mozartpreis – 1. Preis, Publikumspreis, Richard-Strauss-Preis)
- 2000: European Cultural Promotion Prize of the European Cultural Foundation "Pro Europa"
- 2002: Promotion of the highly gifted Konzertgesellschaft München
