= Christina Landshamer =

German operatic soprano

Christina Landshamer (born 1977) is a German operatic soprano.

== Life and career ==
Born and raised in Munich, Landshamer studied singing at the Hochschule für Musik und Theater München with Angelica Vogel from 1996. She continued her studies at the State University of Music and Performing Arts Stuttgart in Konrad Richter's Lied class and the soloist class with Dunja Vejzovic. In November/December 2001, she sang Papagena in The Magic Flute at the Tollwood Festival in Munich. In 2003, Landshamer was awarded a scholarship by the Deutscher Musikrat and two years later took part in the world premiere of Hans Zender's Chief Joseph, a musical theatre in three acts, at the Staatsoper Unter den Linden. At the beginning of 2007, she took on the main role in the world premiere of Trans-Warhol - the voice of Andy Warhol - by the French composer Philippe Schoeller in Geneva. In the same year, she could be heard as Suor Genovieffa in a concert performance of Puccini's opera Suor Angelica, as well as Zerlina in the concert performance of Don Giovanni at the "Herrenchiemsee-Festival".

Further important stations of Landshamer's career were concerts with the Munich Philharmonic, the Bach-Collegium Stuttgart, the Bach-Collegium Munich, the Klangforum Wien, the Kammerchor Stuttgart, the Rundfunk-Sinfonieorchester Berlin and the Munich Radio Orchestra.

The soprano sang under the direction of renowned conductors such as Christian Thielemann, Marc Albrecht, Stefan Asbury, Riccardo Chailly, Enoch zu Guttenberg, Matthew Halls, Peter Schreier, Ulf Schirmer and Helmuth Rilling.

In the 2008/2009 season, she sang Zerlina and Amor in Orpheus and Eurydice at the Staatsoper Stuttgart, later Marzelline in Strasbourg and Susanna at the Komische Oper Berlin. In 2009, she made her debut at the Theater an der Wien and the Wiener Musikverein conducted by Nikolaus Harnoncourt. In the same year, she played Bach's St. Matthew Passion for Decca Records under the conduct of Riccardo Chailly.

Landshamer also devotes herself to chamber music projects and contemporary music. Her favourite composers include Robert Schumann and Viktor Ullmann. Christina Landshamer recorded songs by Schumann and Ullmann with the lieder pianist Gerold Huber in 2016 on her first solo CD.

== Awards ==
- 2004: Prizewinner at the International Johann Sebastian Bach Competition and Grand Prix Competition of the Konzertgesellschaft München
- 2006: 3rd prize in the Bad Kissingen competition
