= Konzertgesellschaft München =

The Konzertgesellschaft München is a non-profit association dedicated to the cultivation and promotion of classical music and, since 2017, jazz.

Through the international singing competition Vokal genial, which took place annually alternating with the August Everding Music Competition for Instrumentalists, the Konzertgesellschaft München and its members have paved the way for more than 100 artists to pursue an international career over the past 30 years. In 1999, the Konzertgesellschaft München was awarded the Europäischen Kulturpreis in recognition of its merits.

In addition, the association, in accordance with its statutes, promotes highly talented musicians, awards promotional prizes, promotes the international exchange of artists, cultivates classical and modern contemporary music and supports the Münchener Bach-Tradition as well as music projects that could not be realized without patronage.

In this way, the Konzertgesellschaft München makes a targeted contribution to the cultural diversity of Munich and Bavaria as a music location.

== History ==
The association was founded in 1986 following the example of the Mozarteum Argentino, a music foundation in Argentina founded in 1952, which contributes significantly to the musical life of its country. The initiators of the foundation were the art historian Johann Georg Prince of Hohenzollern and the cultural manager Helmut Pauli.

== Bodies ==
The organizational bodies of the Konzertgesellschaft München are the General Assembly, the Presidium, the Board of Trustees and the Artistic Advisory Board. Each member is entitled to vote and can make suggestions at the General Assembly of Members and participate in decisions on amendments to the Statutes, election and discharge of the Presidium. The Presidium, to which the Board of Trustees and the Artistic Advisory Board are assigned in an advisory and supporting capacity, works on a voluntary basis.

=== Presidium ===
The Presidium consists of Karl Friedrich von Hohenzollern (President), Désirée von Bohlen und Halbach (Vice-President) as well as Konstanze Wiedemann, Conrado Dornier, Norbert Roos and Jens Spaniol.

=== Board of trustees ===
The board of trustees is made up of public and cultural figures who are active promoters of music in public. It advises and supports the board of trustees in the implementation of its objectives. For this purpose, it is appointed by the Presidium for a period of five years.

== Support for the highly gifted: competitions and prize winners ==
Together with the organization of renowned music competitions, the promotion of the highly gifted is one of the central promotional concerns of the Konzertgesellschaft München. These included the August-Everding Music Competition initiated by August Everding and the International Vocal Competition Vokal genial, which have been held annually since 1987.

- 1987: Michael Martin Kofler (flute)
- 1988: Izabella Labuda, Isabelle Faust (Violin), Trio Wanderer
- 1989: Arcis Quintett mit Albrecht Mayer (Oboe)
- 1990: Juliane Banse (Soprano), Angelika Merkle (Piano), Alfredo Perl (Piano)
- 1991: Violin: Anna Kandinskaja, Sonja Korkeala, Natalia Christina Steurer
- 1992: Piano: Ragna Schirmer, Gloria d'Atri
- 1993: Marianna Tarasova, Simone Nold, Markus Hollop, Juanita Lascarro (Vocals), Marcus Kretzer (Piano)
- 1994: Jens Plücker, Ursula Petith, Johannes Kaltenbrunner (Horn), Leonid Korkin, Robert Hofmann (Trumpet)
- 1995: Cello: Concours de violoncelle Rostropovitcht, Nikolaus Popa, Kirill Kravtzov
- 1996: Harp: Xavier de Maistre, Charlotte Balzereit, Jana Bousková
- 1997: Lyric Tenor: Lars Lettner, Alfred Bøe, Hubert Nettinger, In-Hak Lee
- 1998: String quartet: ConTempo String Quartet, Klenke Quartet Weimar, Casal Quartet, Modus Quartet
- 1999: Oboe: Clara Dent, Susanne Hennicke, Kai Rapsch
- 2000: Piano: Tobias Stork, Jean Muller, Christian Chamorel
- 2001: Piano trio: Zurich Piano trio, Trio Ondine, Eurus-Trio
- 2002: Violin: Andrej Bielow, Lena Neudauer, Daniel Röhn
- 2003: Historical performance practice: Mo Yi und Chia-hsuan Tsai, Leila Schayegh und Gerd Amelung, Duo Seraphim
- 2004: Das deutsche Lied: Colin Balzer, Christina Landshamer and Stefanie Irányi
- 2005: Clarinet: Christopher Corbett, AntonioDuca, Daniel Ottensamer
- 2006: Piano: Alexej Gorlatch, Dudana Mazmanishvili, Jean Muller
- 2007: Vokal genial: Julia Hajmóczy, Ai Ichihara, Melissa Shippen
- 2008: Organ: Michael Schöch, Matthias Egger, Balthasar Baumgartner
- 2009: Vokal genial: Joo Hee Jung, Hyo Jung Kim, JunHo You
- 2010: Hendrik Blumenroth (Violoncello), Wen Xiao Zheng (Viola), Felix K. Weber (Violin)
- 2011: Vokal genial: Abigail Mitchell, Catalina Bertucci, Ilya Silchukov
- 2012: Flute: Mikhail Khvostikov, Elise Gastaldi, Mark Xiao
- 2013: Vokal genial: Camille Schnoor, Dae Hyun Ahn, Joshua Stewart
- 2014: String quartet: Aris Quartett, Abel Quartet, Goldmund Quartett
- 2015: Vokal genial: Vera-Lotte Böcker, Sangmin Jeon, Jiyoung Angela Shin
- 2016: Percussion: Vanessa Porter, Hye-ji Bak, Tomi Emilov
- 2019: Jazz: Sam Hylton
- 2020: Vocal: Katja Maderer, Jonas Maximilian Müller
- 2021: Jazz: Enkhjargal Erkhembayar

== Award ==
- 1999 Awarded the European Cultural Prize of the Stiftung Pro Europa in recognition of the promotion of historical performance practice in music.
