= Neuhausen-Nymphenburg =

Borough of Munich, Germany

Coordinates: 48°9′25″N 11°31′0″E

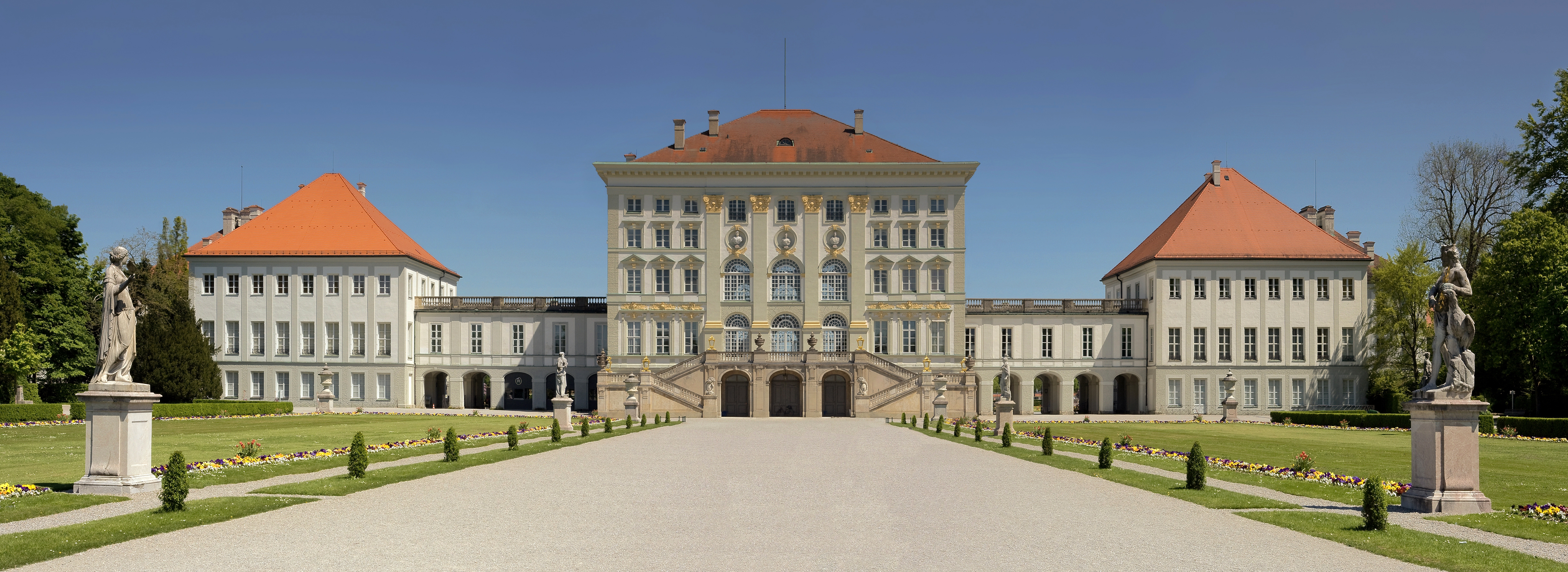
Nymphenburg Palace

Neuhausen-Nymphenburg (German pronunciation: [nɔʏˈhaʊzn̩ ˈnʏmfnbʊʁk]) is a borough of Munich, the capital of the German state of Bavaria. It was created from the merger of the former boroughs of Neuhausen (Central Bavarian: Neihausn) and Nymphenburg in 1992.

== Location ==
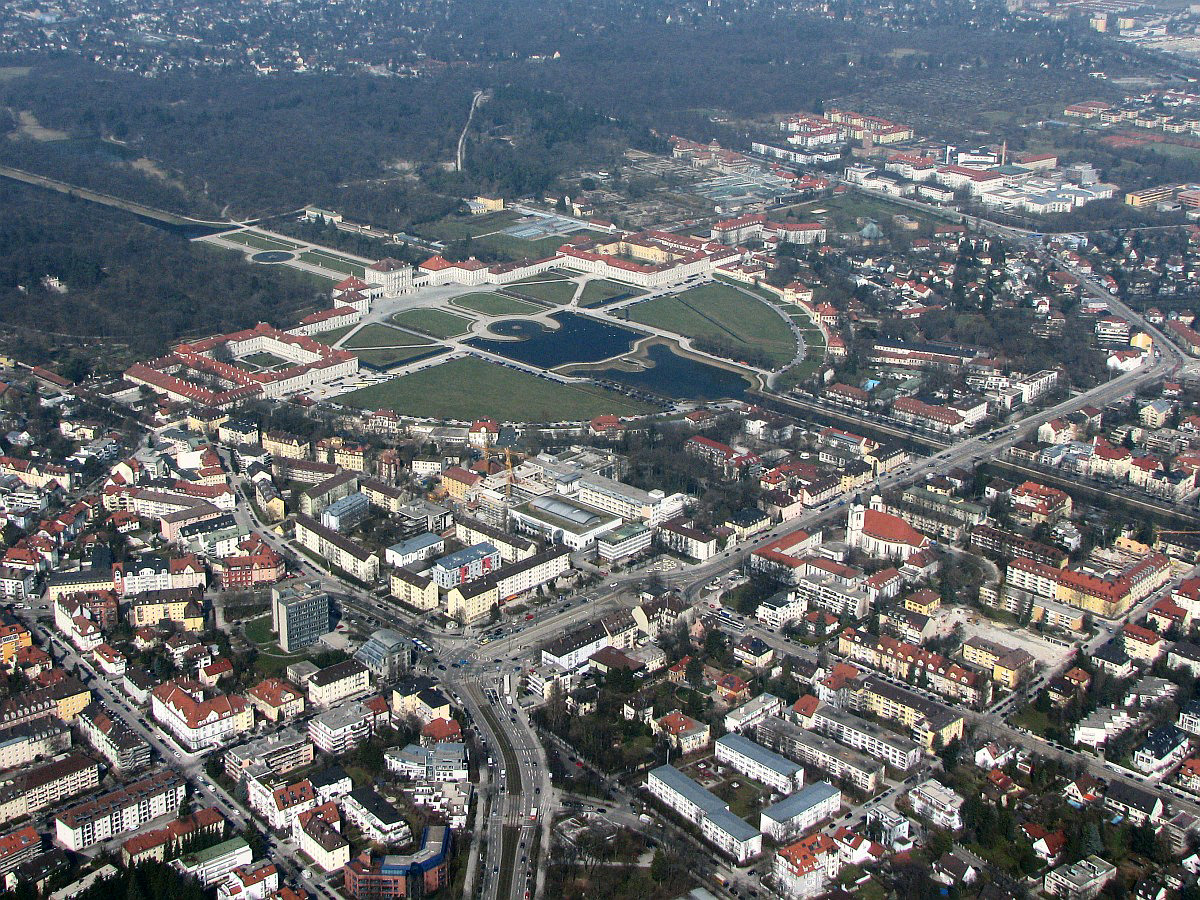
Neuhausen-Nymphenburg with the Nymphenburg Palace Park

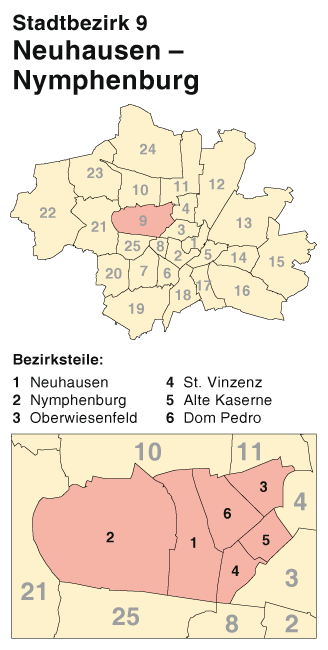
Map of the Stadtbezirk 09

Nymphenburg borders Obermenzing in the north-west, Pasing in the south-west, Moosach in the north and Neuhausen in the south-east.

The borough 09 ranges from the Mars-field at the inner edge of town to the Nymphenburg Palace in the west and extends from the south part of the Olympic Park (including the Tollwood Summer festival area and the East-West Peace Church) over the villa colony in Gern to the railway tracks.

== History and description ==
Neuhausen is a quiet residential area. It is one of the most exclusive and expensive boroughs in Munich.

Typical of the borough is its mix of different urban areas. Around the end of the 19th Century a prestigious residential neighborhood was built in the palace's vicinity, where numerous examples of late nineteenth century architecture, like the villa colonies Neuwittelsbach and Gern can be found.

In 1890 the borough Neuhausen was unincorporated, which had already been a prosperous district. It was dominated by residential and office houses in a closed, dense block-building style. Along the Arnulfroad and its side streets, these are often cooperative apartment buildings such as the partly under preservation attempt-settlement of the Bavarian Post and Telegraph Association and the village of Neuhausen. In the north of the Rotkreuzplatz there are more villas and town houses of the early days.

In the south along the railway tracks there are partly dominating large-scale commercial used buildings. Center and urban hub of the neighborhood of the Rotkreuzplatz. Some well-preserved buildings from the founder and inter-war period with the rich variety of green spaces give Neuhausen a high quality of living. While the old quarters in the vicinity of Nymphenburgerstreet and Blutenburgstreet are home to upper middle class for some time, the sometimes less sumptuously executed turn of the century buildings offer in the vicinity of Schulstreet and Donnersbergerstreet housing for various population groups. But has also kept the so-called gentrification catchment by road trains and remodeled buildings were renovated. In addition, there were numerous conversions take place in condominiums and shops were once easy to architectural firms, alternative shops, bars and restaurants. For this reason, the City Council in 2006 extended the statute for preservation of this neighborhood, to counteract the displacement of ancestral inhabitants.

On 1 January 1891 the independent municipality Nymphenburg was incorporated to the city of Munich.

It is named after the Nymphenburg Palace, former summer residence of the Bavarian kings. Today the castle along with the Nymphenburg Palace Park is one of the most popular sights of Munich.

The in 1747 by Elector Max III. Joseph founded Nymphenburg Porcelain Manufactory, the Royal Stables Museum of Nymphenburg and the Museum of Man and Nature is located next to the palace. On the Nymphenburg Palace Park also borders the Botanical Garden, which entrance is near the Bavarian State Office of Weights and Measures. The Hirschgarten and the Olympic Park complement the diverse range of parks and recreational areas. Because the borough is connected by the motorway A8 and the ring road it is charged by high traffic volumes. Neuhausen-Nymphenburg has about 90,000 inhabitants, according to Ramersdorf-Perlach the second highest population of the boroughs of Munich. In the north of Neuhausen, between the borough is Gern and Moosach-Nederling, in the northeastern the borough of Ebenau.

The jobs of the district are in addition to trade and service sector largely in the public sector. Apart from the branch of Deutsche Bahn, the Bundeswehr's administrative center, the Bavarian State Criminal Police Office, and numerous hospitals, such as the Red Cross Hospital, the German Heart Center, the Brothers of Mercy Hospital and the Third Order Hospital there are also major social institutions in the borough.

The proportion of foreigners Nymphenburg is low, in Neuhausen it is average. Regarding the age distribution Neuhausen is the younger of the two districts.

== Gallery ==
Neuhausen-Nymphenburg

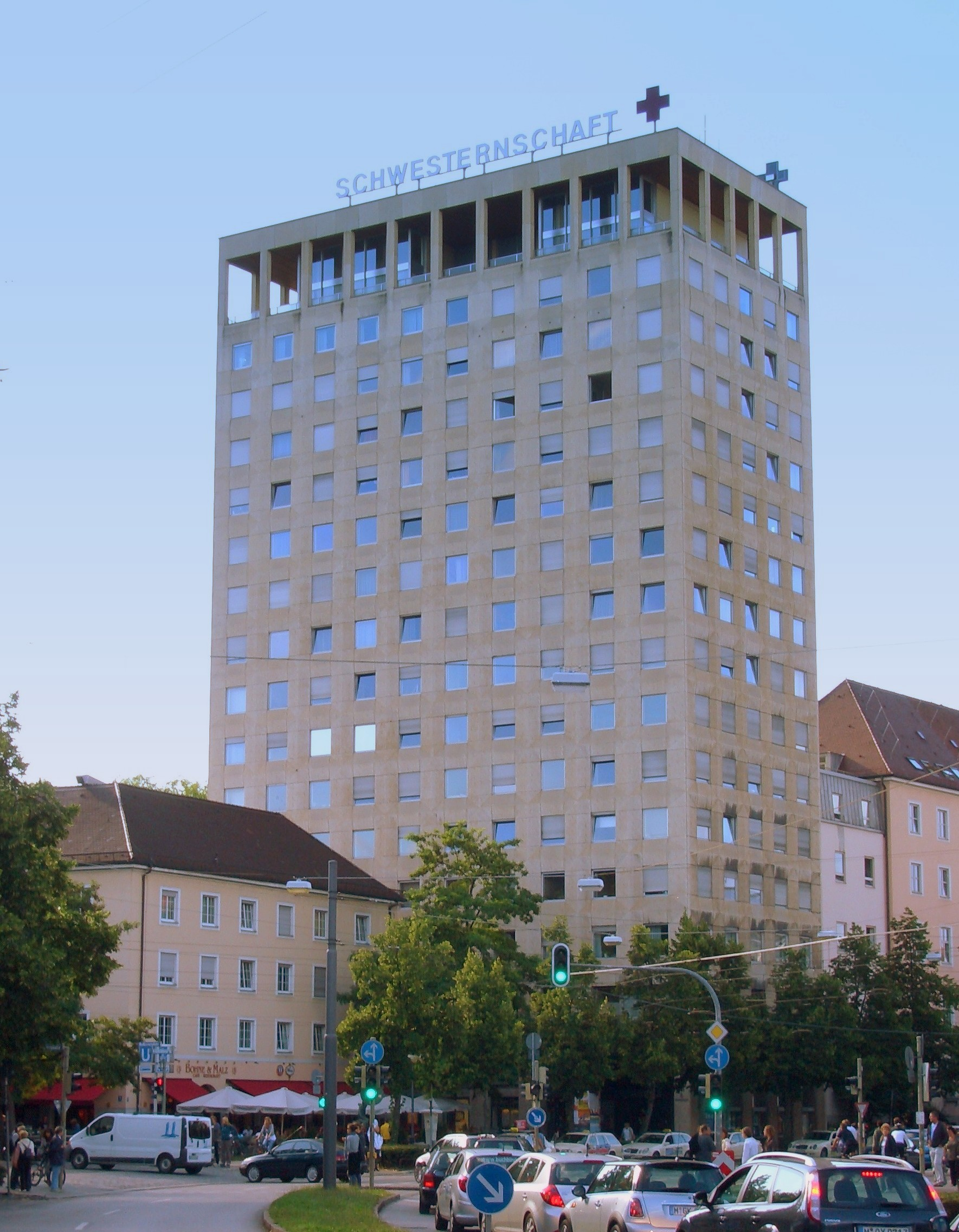
Red Cross Hospital at Rotkreuzplatz

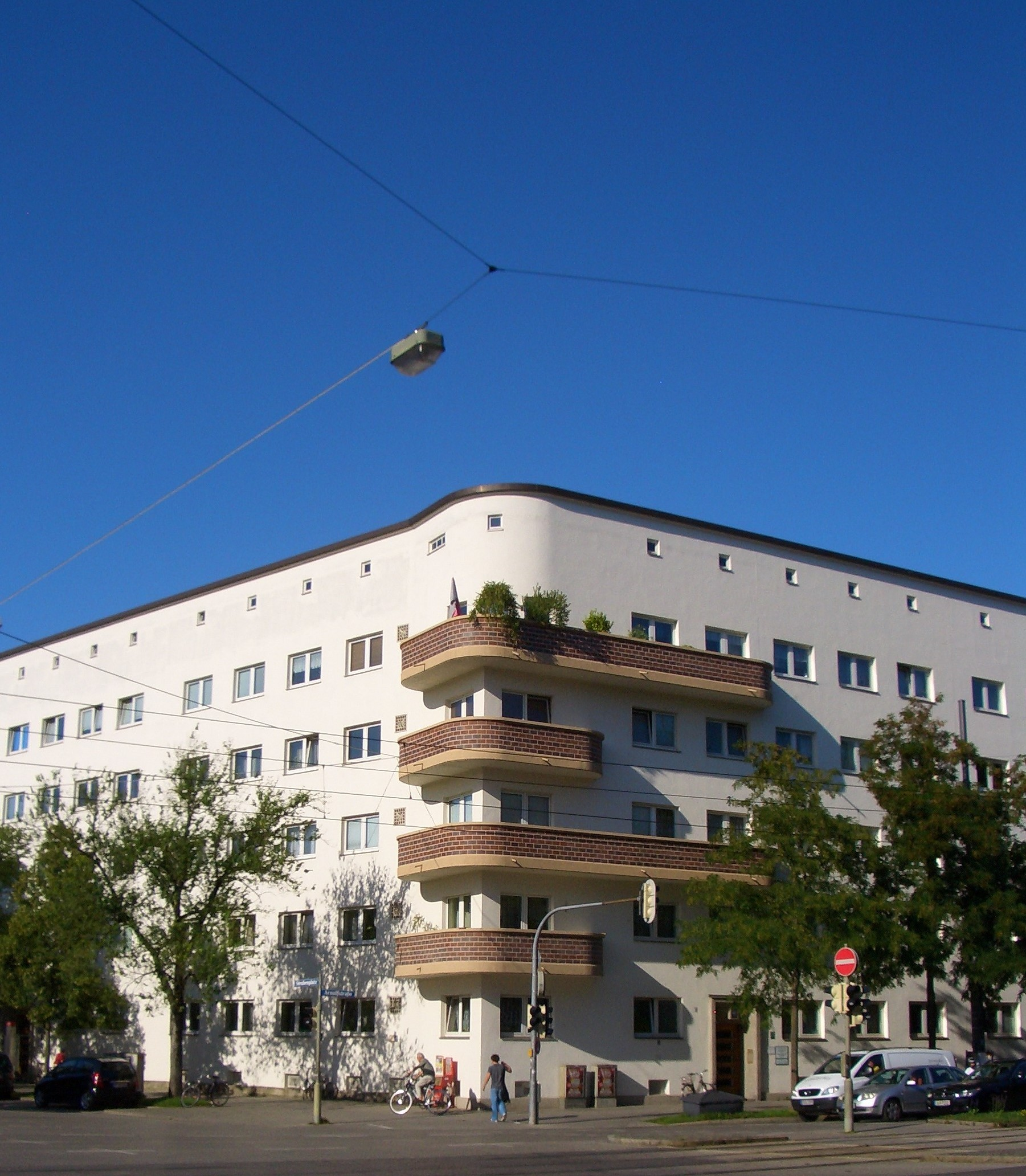
Neuhausen

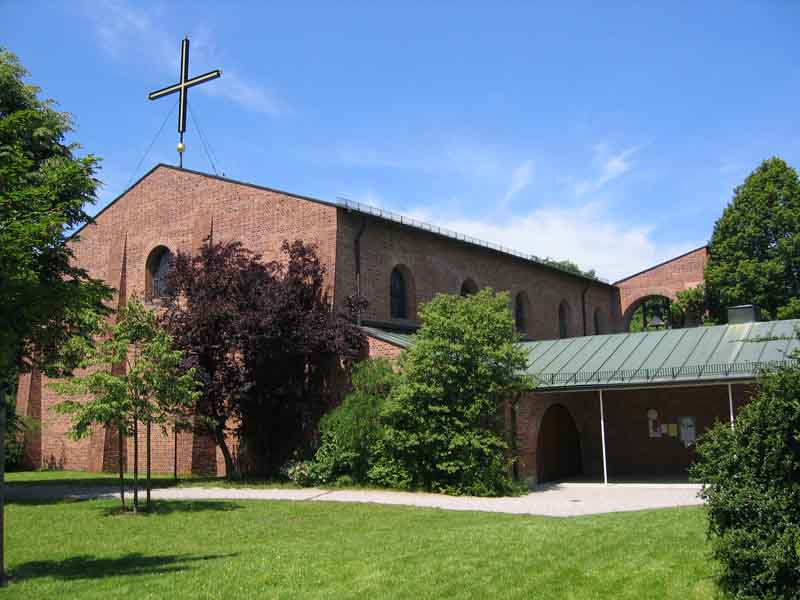
St. Laurentius (Gern)

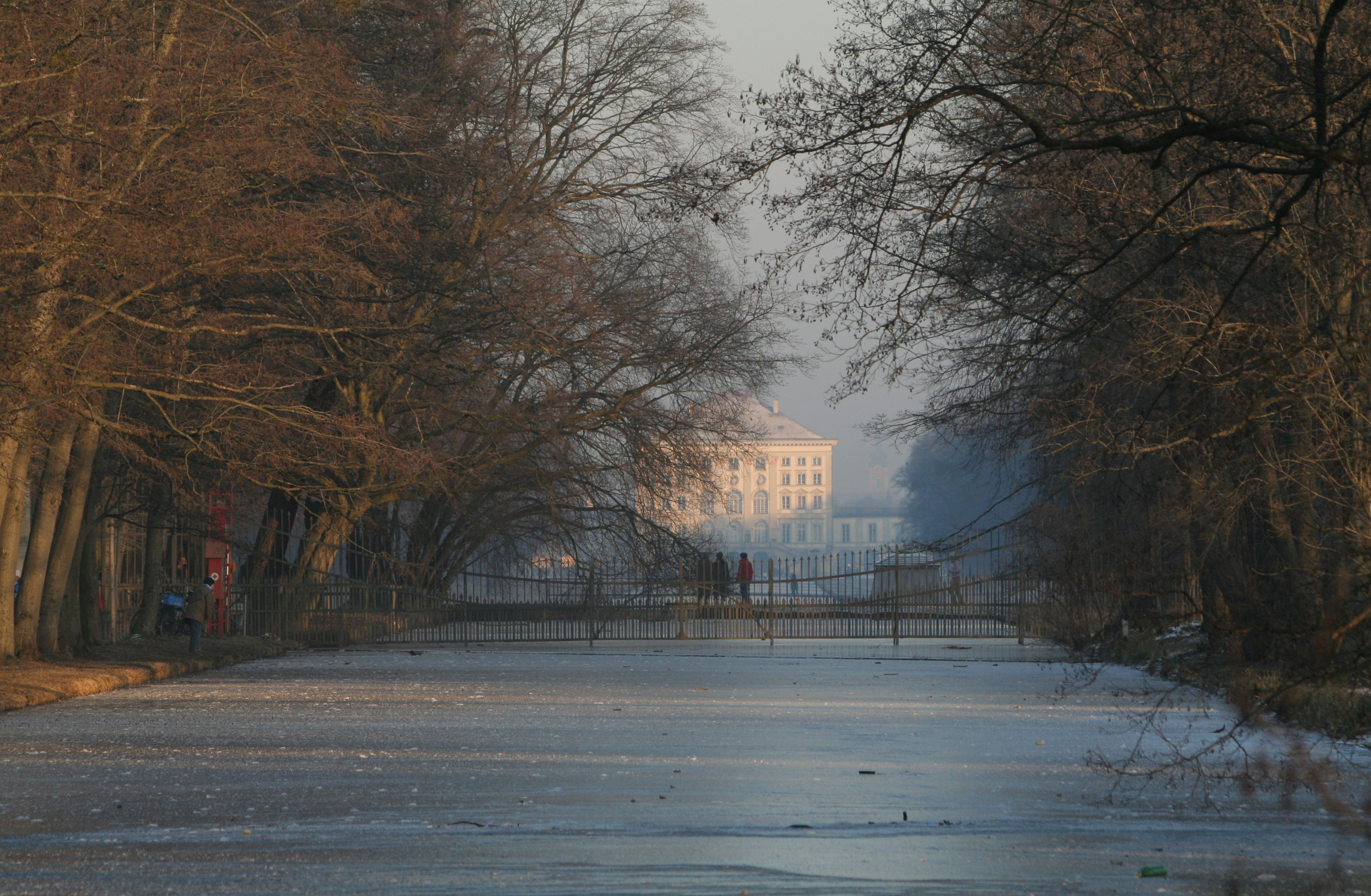
Nymphenburg in the winter

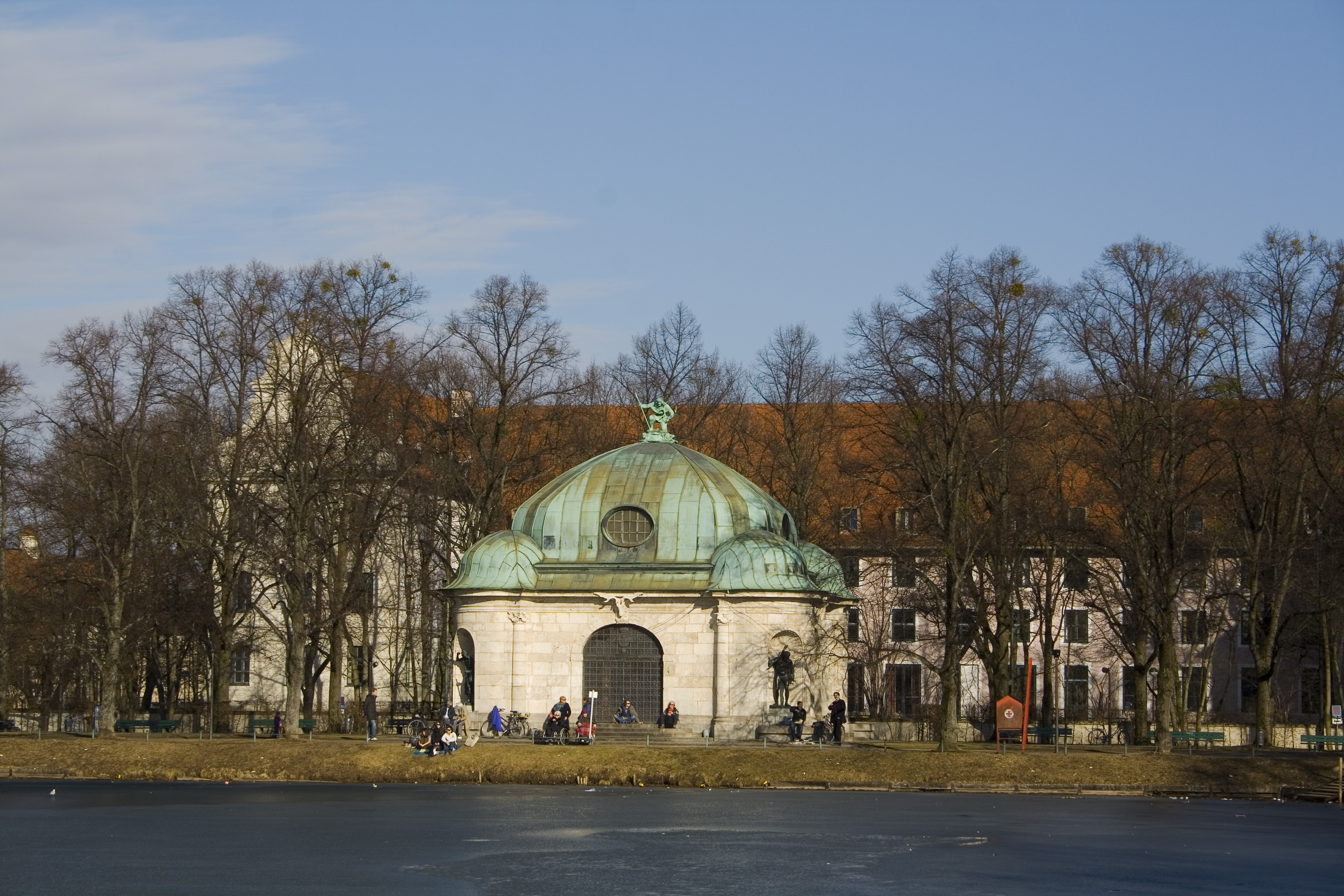
Hubertusbrunnen in Neuhausen-Nymphenburg

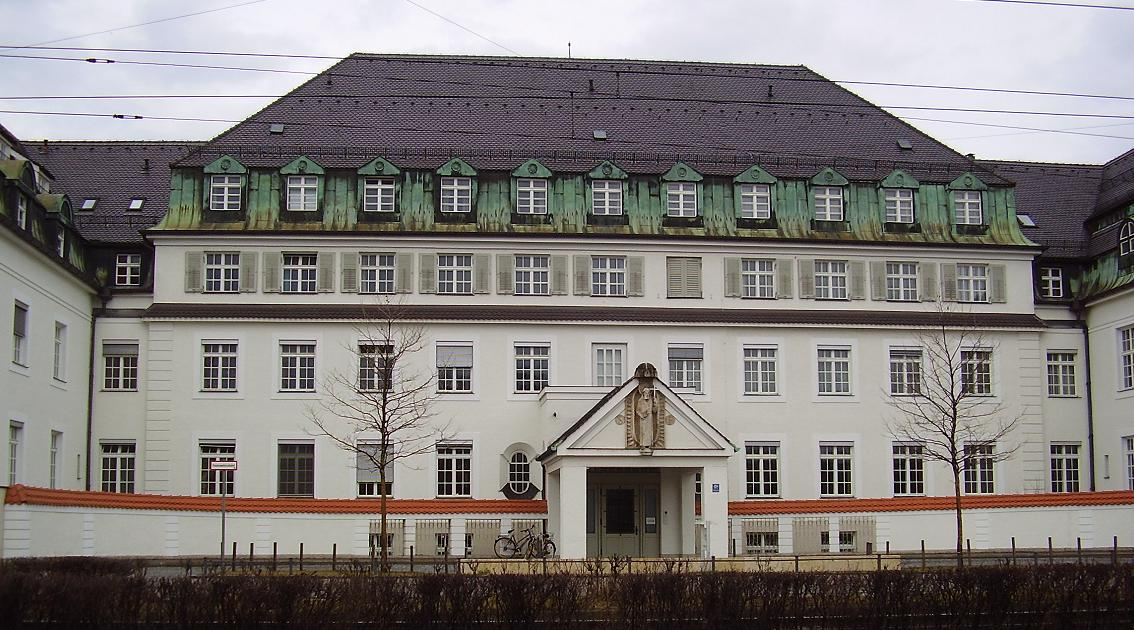
Third Order Hospital

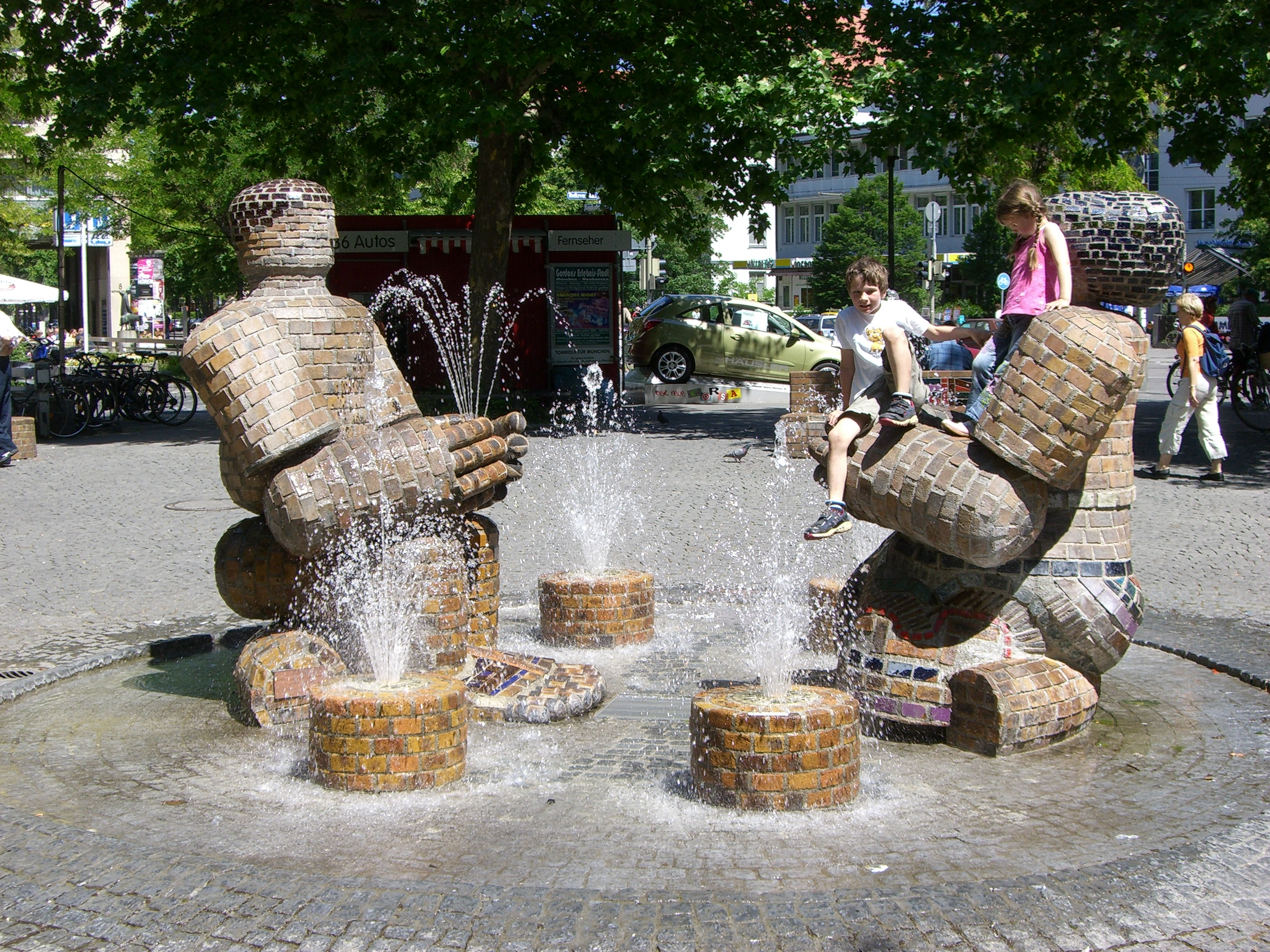
Fountain at Rotkreuzplatz in Neuhausen

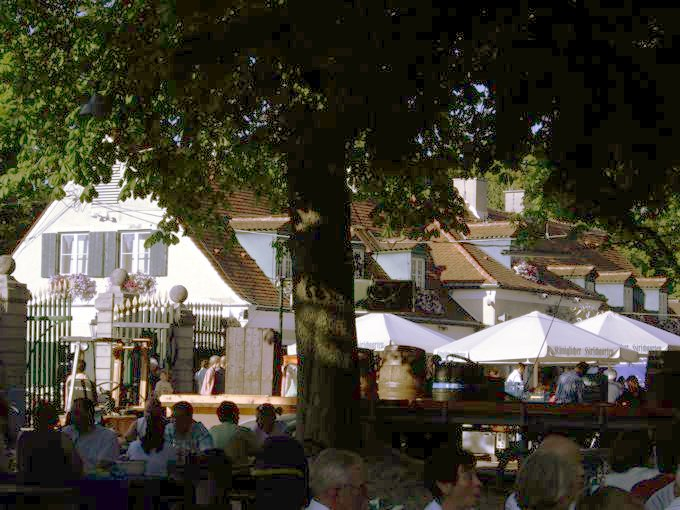
Hirschgarten

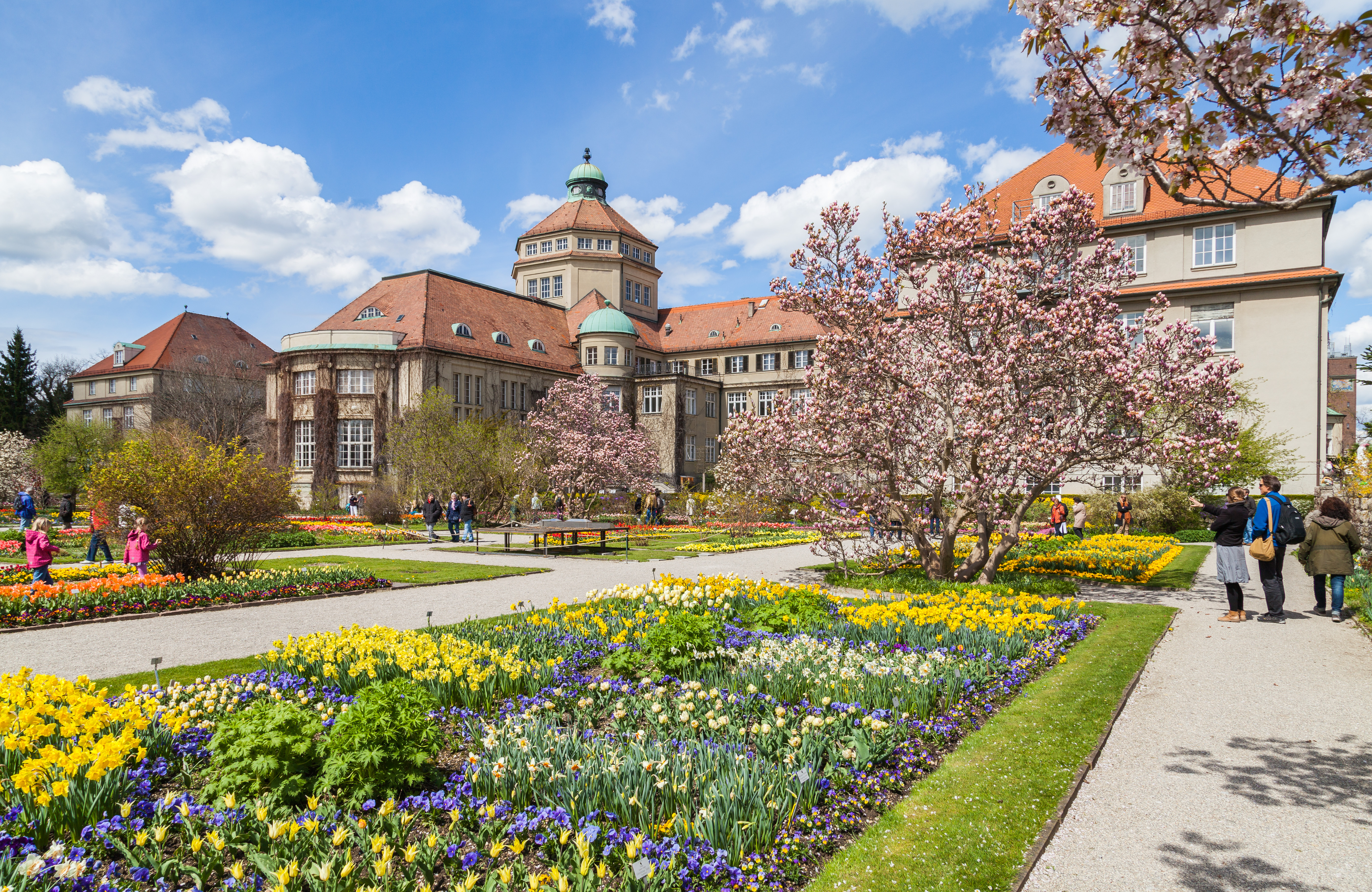
Botanical Garden

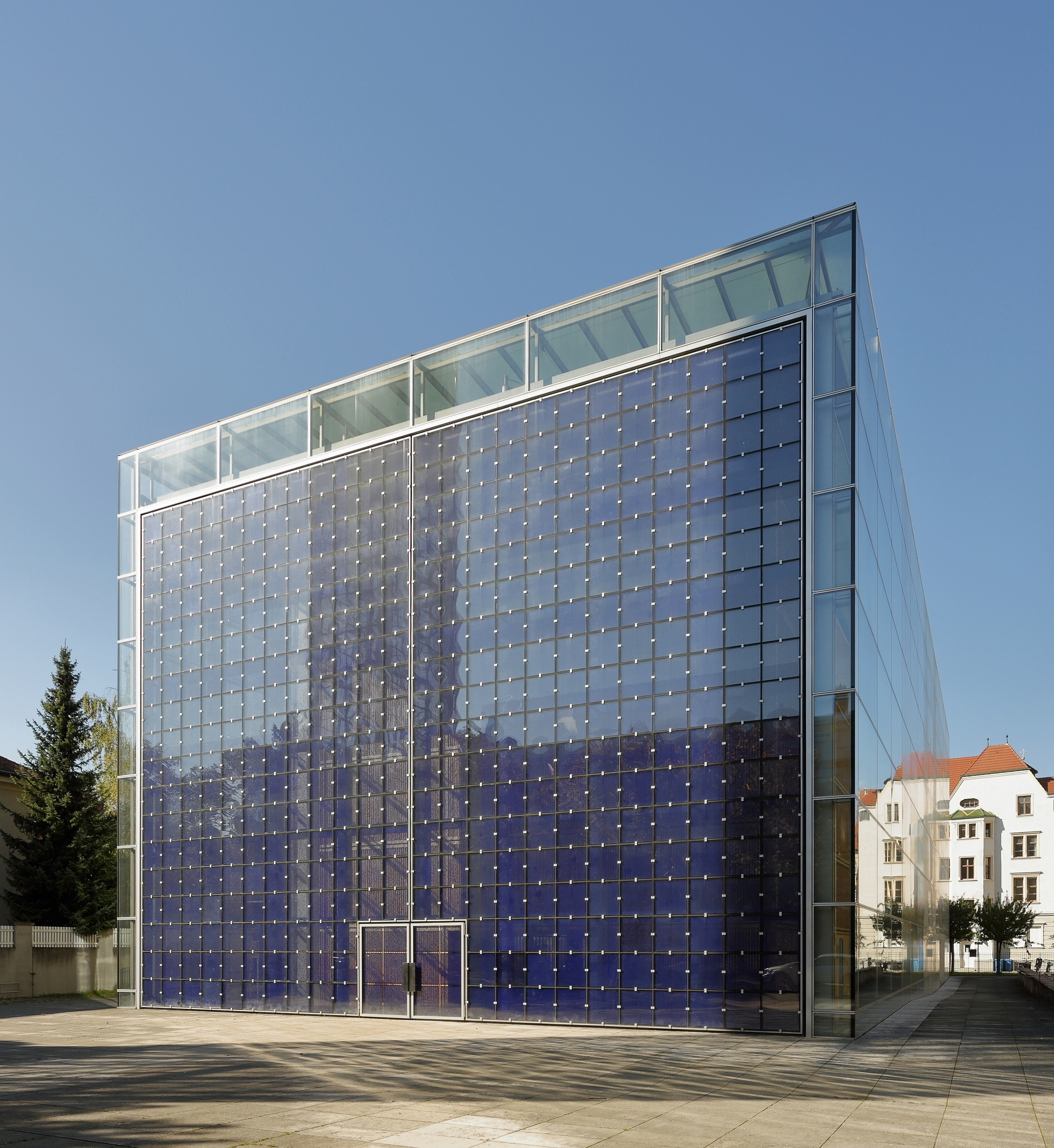
Herz-Jesu-Kirche, Munich

== Statistics ==
(As of each 31 December, residents whose main residence)

year	residents	foreigners	area (ha)	res./ha	source and further details
2000	81.968	17.923 (21,9%)	1,291,86	63	Statistisches Taschenbuch München 2001. pdf-Download
2001	82.235	17.972 (21,9%)	1.291,86	64	Statistisches Taschenbuch München 2002. pdf-Download
2002	81.947	17.795 (21,7%)	1.291,86	63	Statistisches Taschenbuch München 2003. pdf-Download
2003	81.661	17.703 (21,7%)	1.291,84	63	Statistisches Taschenbuch München 2004. pdf-Download
2004	81.921	18.041 (22,0%)	1.291,61	64	Statistisches Taschenbuch München 2005. pdf-Download
2005	82.156	17.890 (21,8%)	1.291,45	64	Statistisches Taschenbuch München 2006. pdf-Download
2006	84.604	18.016 (21,3%)	1.289,08	66	Statistisches Taschenbuch München 2007. pdf-Download
2007	85.964	18.118 (21,1%)	1.287,95	67	Statistisches Taschenbuch München 2008. pdf-Download
2008	87.043	18.836 (21,2%)	1.293,31	67	Statistisches Taschenbuch München 2009. pdf-Download

== Education and culture ==
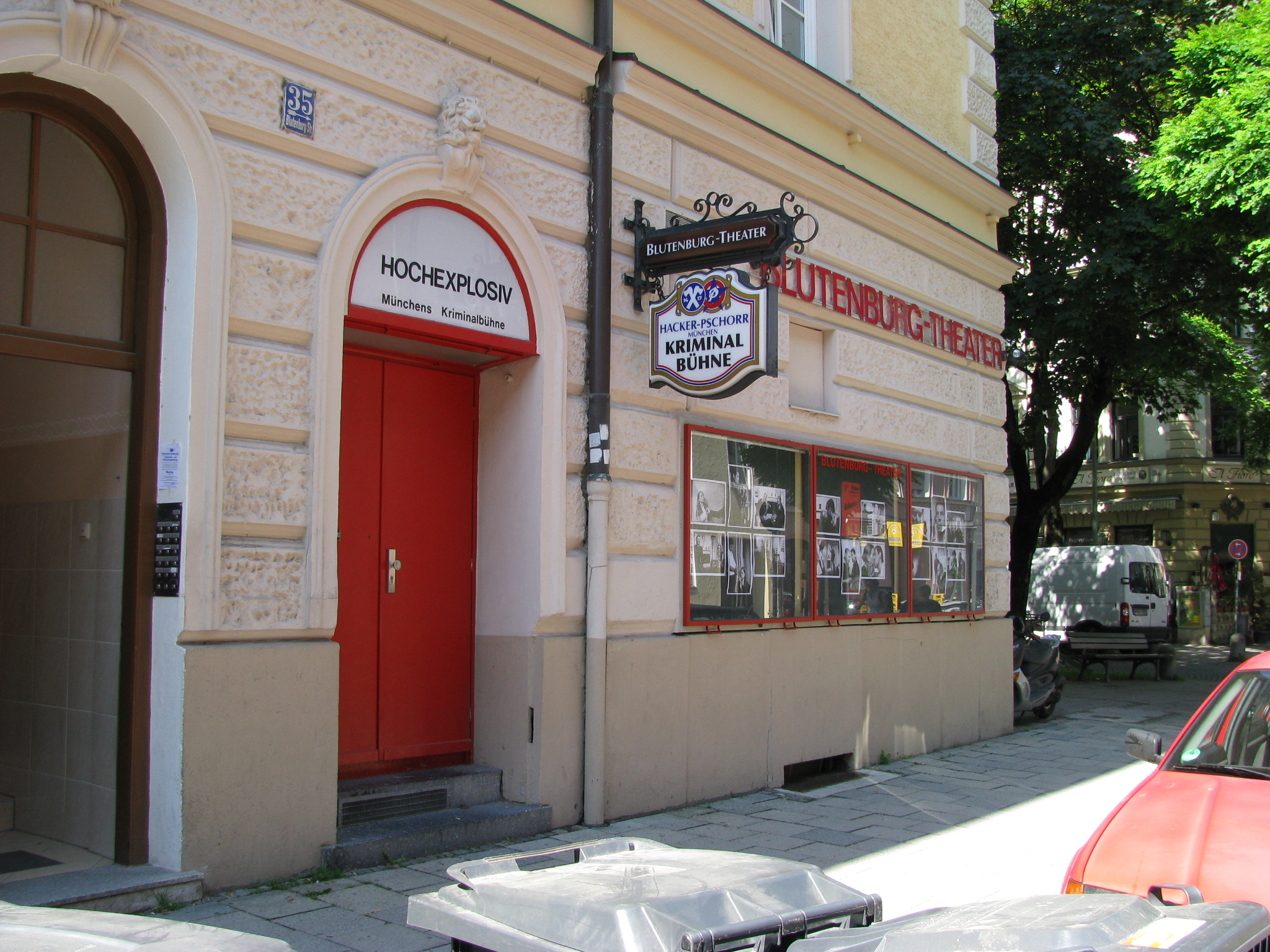
Blutenburg-Theatre

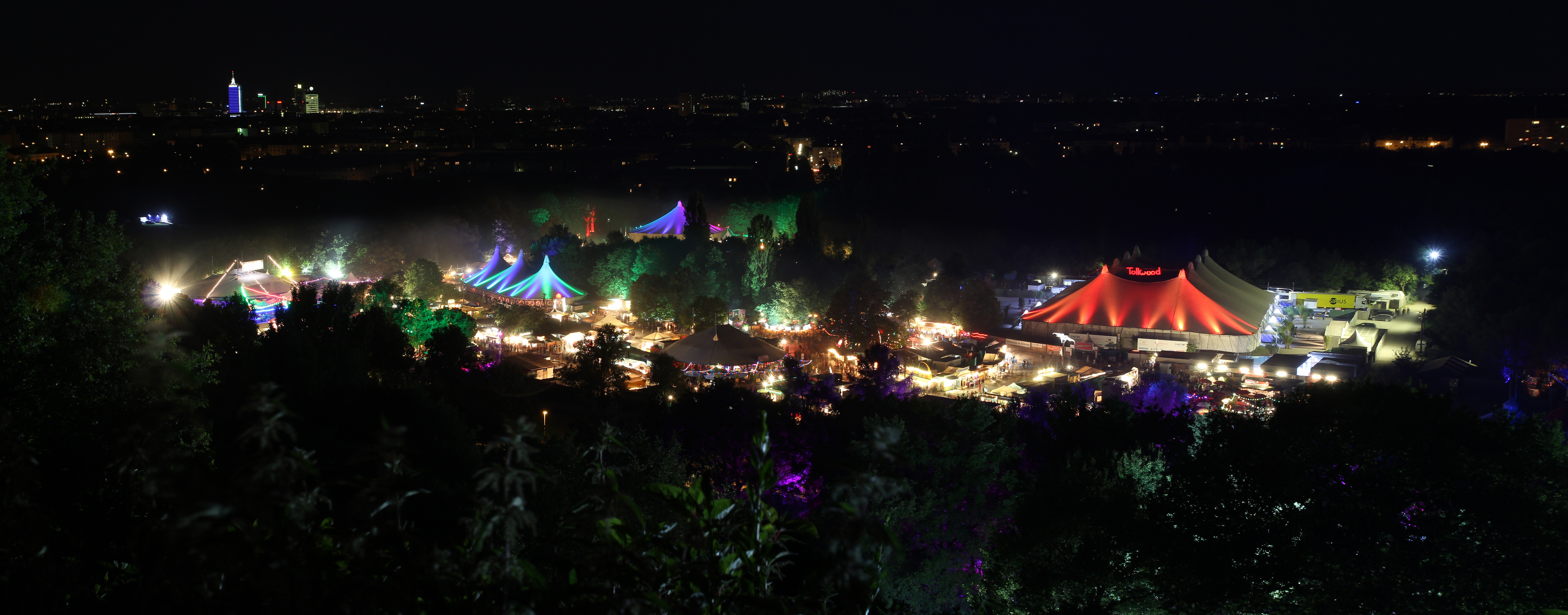
Tollwood Festival

- Blutenburg-Theatre, Blutenburgstraße 35
- History Workshop Neuhausen e. V., Neuhauser Trafo, Nymphenburger Str. 171a
- Maxim (Cinema), Landshuter Allee 33
- Munich College, Außenstelle Neuhausen, Neuhauser Trafo, Nymphenburger Str. 171a
- Munich Library, Borough-Library, Neuhauser Trafo, Nymphenburger Str. 171a
- Nymphenburger Schools, School-Center, Sadelerstraße 10
- Pathos Transportation Theatre, Dachauer Straße 110d
- Summer Tollwood Festival

== Politics ==
In Munich each borough has a Borough Committee (Bezirksausschuss BA). The Borough Committees are elected by local citizens in municipal elections. The Borough Committee consists of 39 members. The election of the Borough Committee of 2 March 2008 yielded the following results:

- SPD 16 seats – 41,4%
- CSU 10 seats – 26,6%
- Bündnis 90/Die Grünen 9 seats – 20,1%
- FDP 3 seats – 7,6%
- David contra Goliath/ÖDP 2 seats – 4,3%

Chairman of the BA is Ingeborg Staudenmeyer (SPD). The Vice-Chairmen are Roland Zintl (Greens) and Immoi Scheibel (CSU). The Greens and the ÖDP provide a common fraction.

The municipality is represented in the City Council by Oliver Belik (SPD) and Councilwoman Elizabeth Schmucker (CSU).

== Celebrities ==
According to legend, Neuhausen was christianised by Blessed Winthir in the 8th century.

- Author Alfred Andersch
- Author Manfred Bieler
- Historian Karl Bosl
- Architect Hans Döllgast
- Toolmaker Anton Drexler
- Actor Helmut Fischer
- Landscape painter Max Haushofer (1811–1866)
- Ellis Kaut, developer of Pumuckl
- Oskar von Miller, founder of Deutschen Museums
- Sculptor Karl Knappe
- Soccer-player Philipp Lahm (born 1983)
- Composer Carl Orff (1895–1982)
- Journalist Ponkie
- Lilo Ramdohr (born 1913), who lived as Lilo Berndl from 1941 until 1944 in Nymphenburg, where in May 1942 cartoons with leaflets of the White Rose had been highjacked by Alexander Schmorell
- Poet Eugen Roth
- Author Augustin Souchy
- Operatic baritone and voice teacher Hermann Wiedemann (1879–1944)
