= East-West Peace Church =

Church in Munich, Germany

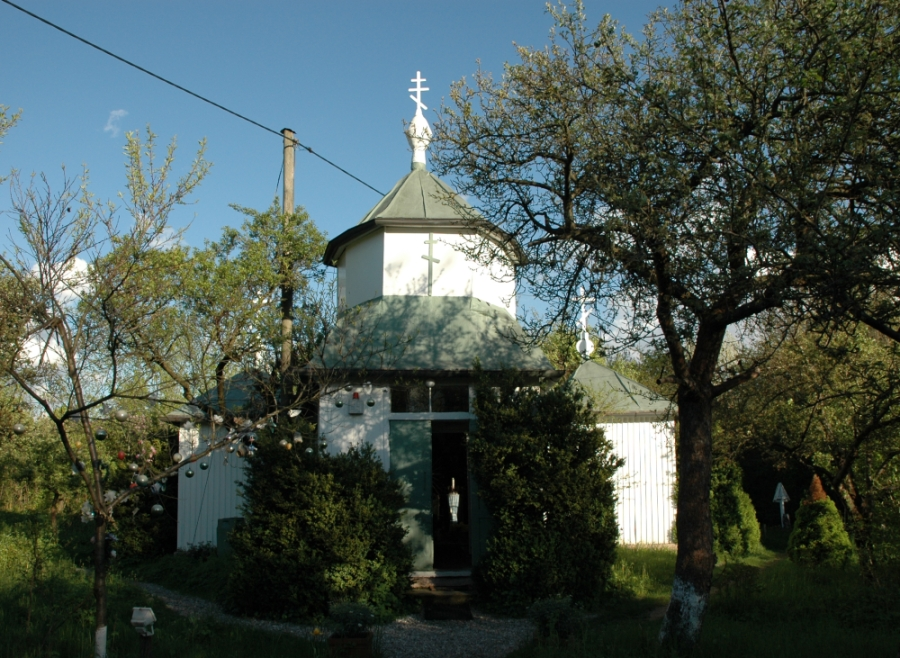
(2005)

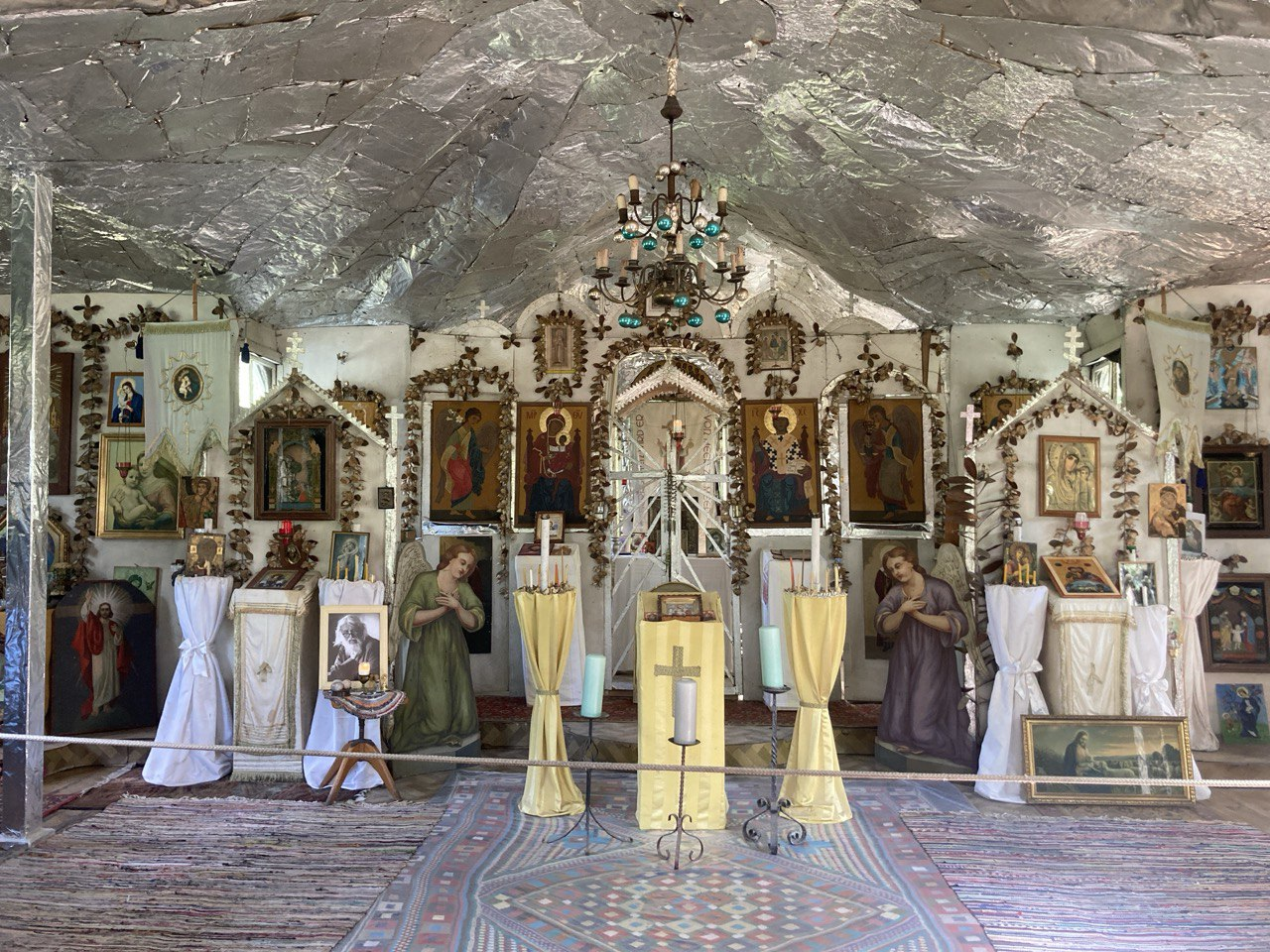
Interior (9 June 2023)

The East-West Peace Church (German: Ost-West-Friedenskirche), also known as the Church of Father Timofej (German: Kirche von Väterchen Timofej), was a chapel in the Olympiapark in Munich.

Built by the Russian hermit Timofej Vasilyevich Prokhorov and his wife Natasha without a building permit in the 1950s, the church was destroyed in a fire on 11 June 2023.

== Location ==
The chapel was located in the Munich borough of Neuhausen-Nymphenburg, south of the Olympic Lake at Spiridon-Louis-Ring 100.

== History ==
During World War II, Timofej said he had a vision of Mary, in which he was instructed to move west from Russia to build a church there. For this, he left his family. On his journey, he met his future wife, Natasha, in Vienna in 1944. In 1952, after another vision, he moved to Munich. In a third vision, Timofej received the order to build a church at Oberwiesenfeld and, along with his wife, began to build the church and the dwelling from remains of a nearby rubble mountain.

Upon completion, Timofej offered his church building to both the Catholic Church and the Russian Orthodox Church in Munich as a place of worship. However, those in charge of each rejected the offer, as the Catholics saw too many elements of the Orthodox in the building, and the Orthodox in turn saw too many Catholic elements. As a result, Timofey himself celebrated the liturgy. He did not administer the sacraments of baptism and marriage, but instead referred to Catholic or Orthodox priests.

In 1968, when plans were made for the 1972 Summer Olympics, the site of the church was designated as part of the Olympic site. The illegally built church and apartment building were to be demolished for this purpose, and Timofej was to move with his wife to a city apartment. After protests from Munich citizens, and in favor of pre-Olympic peace, the Olympic site was planned further north, so that the church was preserved.

The site was later described by Munich's former mayor, Christian Ude, as the "most charming black building in Munich". After Timofej died on July 14, 2004, at the age of 110, an association took care of the church. Timofeij's home was converted into a museum after his death. The annual Tollwood Festival is held around the grounds of the East-West Peace Church during the summer.

== Destruction ==
On Sunday, June 11, 2023, at around 1:10 am, the Munich fire department was alerted to a fire on the Tollwood grounds. When the emergency services arrived, the church was already in flames and burned down completely. Trees and a power line were also damaged, but no persons were harmed. According to the current state of the investigation, the police assume as the cause of the fire the "presence of a technical defect in the installed electronics inside the church building".

According to BR24 from June 11, 2023, the former mayor of Munich, Christian Ude, publicly advocated the reconstruction of the East-West Peace Church as a symbol of hope for peace.

== Bibliography ==
- Rüdiger Liedtke, Rüdiger (ed.). 111 Orte in München, die man gesehen haben muss, 160–161. Köln: Emons Verlag, 2013.
- Reuther, Ingrid: Bayerns berühmtester Schwarzbau: Die Ost-West-Friedenskirche in München. In: Eva Strauss (ed.): Fundort Geschichte Oberbayern: Ausflüge in die Vergangenheit, 52–54. Cadolzburg: Ars-Vivendi-Verlag, 2003.
