= Asuka Sezaki =

Japanese classical violinist

- Born: 1977 (age 47–48); Kumamoto, Japan
- Education: Tokyo University of the Arts; Conservatoire de Paris
- Occupation: Violinist
- Awards: Henryk Wieniawski Violin Competition

Asuka Sezaki (born 1977) is a Japanese classical violinist who made an international career.

== Life ==
Born in Kumamoto, in the eponymous prefecture, Sezaki began to play the violin at age six. She studied violin at the Tokyo University of the Arts where she graduated as the head of her class. She further studied violin at the Conservatoire de Paris, on a scholarship by the Cultural Agency of Japan, in the class of Régis Pasquier and Jean-Jacques Kantorow, and chamber music with Christian Ivaldi.

For her first recital, in 1992, she performed Paganini's Twenty-four caprices. She has been invited, in France, to the festivals of Bourgogne and Reims as well as to the Festival de musique de l'Orangerie de Sceaux. She has given recitals at the Royal Concertgebouw in Amsterdam, in Paris, the Royal Library of Belgium of Brussels, England, Germany, Switzerland, Hungary and the United States.

Sezaki has played with violinists Kantorow and Pasquier, cellists Tsuyoshi Tsutsumi and Noboru Kamimura, pianists Jean-Claude Pennetier and Katsumi Ueda, Akiyoshi Sako, Hiroyuki Iwai, Ken'ichirō Kobayashi, Naoto Ōtomo and Jun'ichi Hirokami, as well as with the Tokyo Metropolitan Symphony Orchestra, the Tokyo Symphony Orchestra, the Orchestra Ensemble Kanazawa, the NHK Symphony Orchestra, the Poznań Philharmonic, the Munich Radio Orchestra, the Orchestre National de Bretagne and the Ensemble Camerata de Bourgogne.

Thanks to her first prize won at the Concours Stradivarius de la Bourse Forval, Sezaki was able to play for two years on the 1697 Rainville Stradivarius, an instrument received on loan by this foundation.

== Prizes ==
- 1995 : First prize at the Japan Music Competition, with three special prizes
- 1995 : Third prize at the International Violin Competition Leopold Mozart in Augsburg in Germany.
- 1996 : Fourth prize at the Henryk Wieniawski Violin Competition in Poland.
- 2003 : Second prize at the Concours de musique de chambre Premio Trio in Trieste, also the A. Valdovino prize for a piece by Schubert
- 2003 : prix Académie Maurice Ravel : prix de la Ville de Ciboure
- 2005 : Concours Stradivarius de la Bourse Forval : first prize.
- 2007 : Grand Prix du Disque des Arts for her first record with the six sonatas by Eugène Ysaÿe (ALM RECORDS / Kojima Recordings)
