= Kimito Island Music Festival =

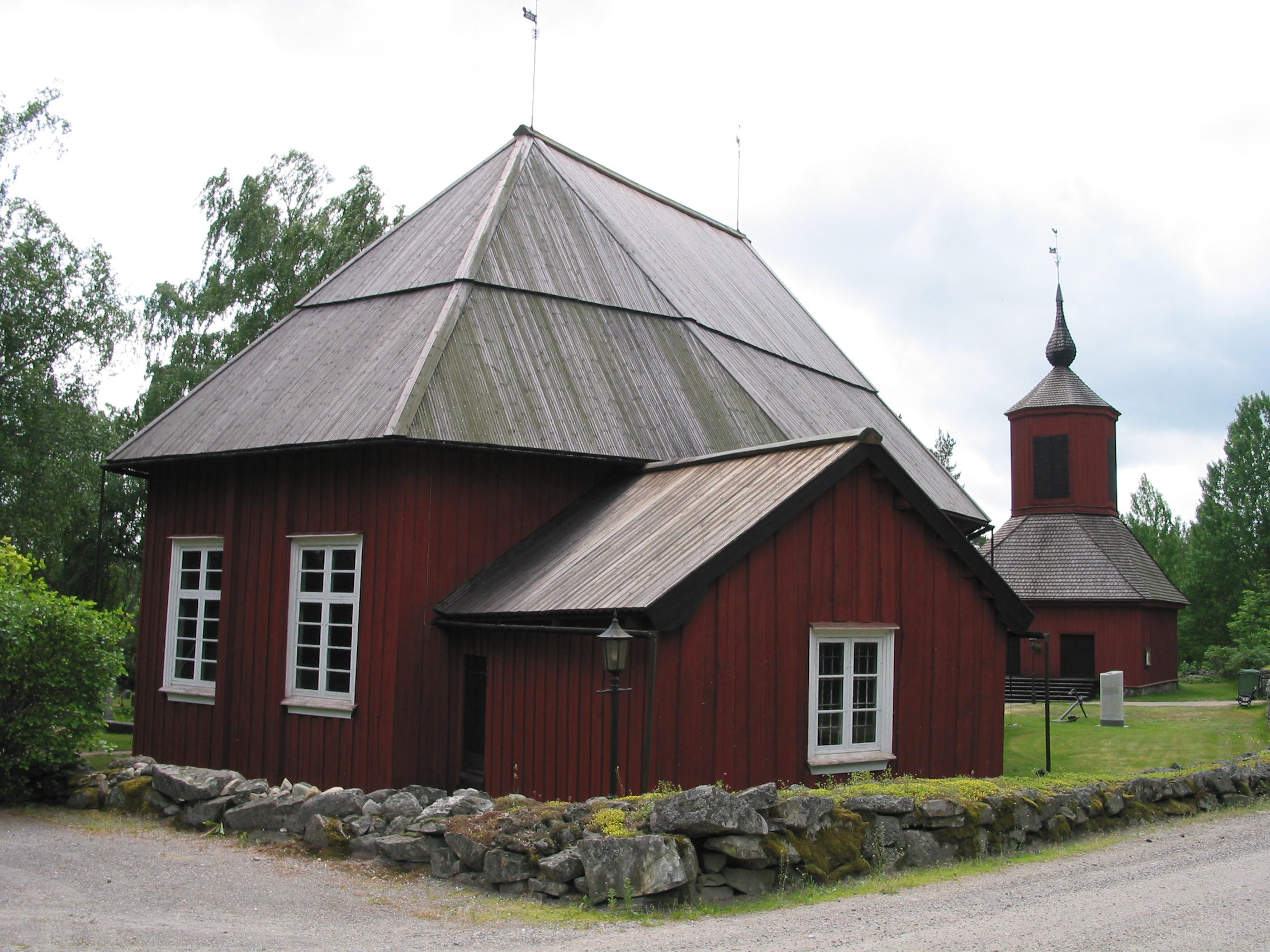
The Västanfjärd Old Church, one of the common venues in the festival.

The Kimito Island Music Festival (Swedish: Kimitoöns Musikfestspel; Finnish: Kemiönsaaren Musiikkijuhlat) is a chamber music festival that is held annually on Kimito Island in mid-July. The event features artists from Finland and abroad with a program ranging from classical to contemporary. The festival was founded in 1999 by pianist Martti Rautio and violinist Katinka Korkeala. Katinka works as an artistic director. The position is shared by her twin sister, violinist Sonja Korkeala, since 2008. The executive director has been Jukka Mäkelä since 2009.

Among other performances, the festivals annually feature a premiere of a piece commissioned for the event by Finnish composers. Commissioned pieces have included works by Aulis Sallinen, Kalevi Aho, Jouni Kaipainen and Einojuhani Rautavaara.

The concert venues of the festival are medieval churches in Kimito and Sauvo, and smaller churches in Hitis, Dragsfjärd, Västanfjärd and Karuna. Other concert venues are the Söderlångvik manor house, which belonged to the Finnish patron Amos Anderson, the Sandö Manor House and the Salo Art Museum. Lunch and dinner concerts are held in The Westers Garden and Labbnäs Vacation Home.

Kimito Island Music Festival is a member of Finland Festivals.
