= International Violin Competition Leopold Mozart in Augsburg =

The International Violin Competition Leopold Mozart in Augsburg is an international violin competition, held every three years in commemoration of Leopold Mozart (1719–1787), the father of Wolfgang Amadeus Mozart. It is the goal of the competition to encourage young violinists and to promote Augsburg's reputation as a German Mozart city. The competition is a member of the World Federation of International Music Competitions (WFIMC) in Geneva. It is run by the Leopold Mozart Board of Trustees in cooperation with the city of Augsburg and the Leopold Mozart Center of the University of Augsburg. Further partners are the Bavarian State Ministry for Science, Research and Art, the District of Swabia, Bavarian Radio and the University of Augsburg.

== History ==
The idea of having an international violin competition in Augsburg was promoted by Klaus Volk, the director in the 1980s of the Leopold Mozart Conservatory. After sufficient funds had been contributed, it was announced that a violin competition would take place in 1987. A non-profit organization, the Leopold Mozart Board of Trustees was founded on 7 July 1986 as operator of the international competition and as funding agency of the conservatory, later the College of Music Nuremberg-Augsburg, now the Leopold Mozart Center of the University of Augsburg.

In 1987 the first International Violin Competition Leopold Mozart was held. Since then the competition has taken place at regular intervals, at first every four years and since 2003 largely every three years. Many Augsburg prize winners have gone on to international careers, among them Isabelle Faust, Benjamin Schmid, Lena Neudauer, Joji Hattori, Suyoen Kim, Yura Lee and Jehye Lee.

== Participation and procedure ==
The competition 2019 is open to young violinists between the ages of 15 and 30. Out of all the applicants a jury chooses approximately 24 participants. The selected candidates demonstrate their talent in three competition rounds. The international jury consists not only of violinists but also of prominent personalities from other music fields. For the first time, the candidates will also be evaluated by a critic jury, an international panel of music journalists. The works which are to be played are decided anew before each competition. In the final round of the competition, the candidates are always required to play a concerto for violin and orchestra by Wolfgang Amadeus Mozart.

In 2006, 2009 and 2016 a special youth jury was initiated. Talented young violin students have the opportunity to evaluate the candidates parallel to the jury of international professionals and to award their own prize.

In 2013, supervised by the Leopold Mozart Center of the University of Augsburg, a composition by Ignaz von Beecke from the Oettingen-Wallerstein collection was edited and performed for the first time in over 200 years as part of the competition repertoire. In 2016 a trio by pianist Franz Xaver Kleinheinz (born 1765 in Nassenbeuren) was edited by pianoforte specialist Christoph Hammer and used for the second round of the competition.

Since 1999 competition repertoire for the second round has included commissioned works by Rodion Shchedrin (4th Violin Competition 1999), Wilfried Hiller (5th Violin Competition 2003), Viktor Suslin (6th Violin Competition 2006) and Frangis Ali-Sade (7th Violin Competition 2009). The commission for the 9th Violin Competition 2016, "Florilegium – Homage to Leopold Mozart" by Johannes X. Schachtner used variations on music by Leopold Mozart to focus on that seldom performed composer. Since 2013, all events of the competition have been broadcast on the internet via live stream, courtesy of the media lab of the University of Augsburg.

== Prizes ==
Participants in the 10th International Violin Competition Leopold Mozart 2019 compete for cash prizes presently totaling approx. €50,000. Beyond that, prize winners have prospects of attaining international recognition by playing concerts at notable festivals and with well-known orchestras throughout Europe.

The first prize award is the Mozart Prize. There are also second and third place cash awards as well as various special prizes and youth advancement awards.

== Prizewinners ==
1987 – 1st International Violin Competition Leopold Mozart:

- 1st prize: Isabelle Faust (Germany)
- 2nd prize: Sigrún Eðvaldsdóttir (Iceland)
- 3rd prize: Anette Behr (Germany)

1991 – 2nd International Violin Competition Leopold Mozart:

- 1st prize: Benjamin Schmid (Austria)
- 2nd prize: Joji Hattori (Japan)
- 3rd prize: Kyung-Sun Lee (South Korea)

1995 – 3rd International Violin Competition Leopold Mozart:

- 2nd prize ex aequo: Felicitas Clamor-Hofmeister (Germany)
- 2nd prize ex aequo: Riyo Uemura (Japan)
- 3rd prize: Asuka Sezaki (Japan)
- 4th prize: Nikolai Sachenko (Russia)
- Audience prize: Nikolai Sachenko (Russia)

1999 – 4th International Violin Competition Leopold Mozart:

- 1st prize (Mozart Prize): Lena Neudauer (Germany)
- 2nd prize: Bogdan Zvoristeanu (Romania)
- 3rd prize: Naoko Ogihara (Japan)
- Audience prize: Lena Neudauer (Germany)
- Richard Strauss Prize: Lena Neudauer (Germany)
- Rodion Shchedrin Prize: Bogdan Zvoristeanu (Romania)
- Special prize for the Richard Strauss Sonata: Naoko Ogihara (Japan)

2003 – 5th International Violin Competition Leopold Mozart:

- 1st prize (Mozart Prize): Suyoen Kim (South Korea)
- 2nd prize: Ye Eun Choi (South Korea)
- 3rd prize: Sophia Jaffé (Germany)
- Audience prize: Suyoen Kim (South Korea)
- Special prize for the best interpretation of the contemporary commissioned piece: Suyoen Kim (South Korea)

2006 – 6th International Violin Competition Leopold Mozart:

- 1st prize (Mozart Prize): Yura Lee (South Korea)
- 2nd prize ex aequo: Gahyun Cho (South Korea)
- 2nd prize ex aequo: Yuki Manuela Janke (Germany)
- Audience prize: Yura Lee (South Korea)
- Youth jury prize: Yura Lee (South Korea)
- Special prize for the best interpretation of the contemporary commissioned piece: Nurit Stark (Israel)

2009 – 7th International Violin Competition Leopold Mozart:

- 1st prize (Mozart Prize): Jehye Lee (South Korea)
- 2nd prize: Friederike Starkloff (Germany)
- 3rd prize: Roman Patočka (Czech Republic)
- Chamber music prize ex aequo: Jehye Lee (South Korea)
- Chamber music prize ex aequo: Roman Patočka (Czech Republic)
- Prize for the best interpretation of the contemporary commissioned piece: Terauchi Shiori (Japan)
- Youth jury prize: Roman Patočka (Czech Republic)
- Audience prize: Jehye Lee (South Korea)

2013 – 8th International Violin Competition Leopold Mozart:

- 1st prize (Mozart Prize): Maia Cabeza (Canada)
- 2nd prize: Jonian Ilias Kadesha (Greece/Albania)
- 3rd prize: Thomas Reif (Germany)
- 4th prize: Young uk Kim (South Korea)
- Chamber music prize: Jonian Ilias Kadesha (Greece/Albania)
- Special prize for the best interpretation of a contemporary piece: Maia Cabeza (Canada) / Ken Schuhmann (Germany)
- Audience prize: Jonian Ilias Kadesha (Greece/Albania)

2016 – 9th International Violin Competition Leopold Mozart:

- 1st prize (Mozart Prize): Ji Won Song (South Korea)
- 2nd prize: Ziyu He (China)
- 3rd prize: Jae Hyeong Lee (South Korea)
- Youth jury prize: Jae Hyeong Lee (South Korea)
- Special prize, CD production: Ji Won Song (South Korea)
- Audience prize: Ji Won Song (South Korea)
- Munich Radio Orchestra Prize: Jae Hyeong Lee (South Korea)
- Special prize for interpretation of the commissioned piece: Ziyu He (China)
- Special prize, "Swabian chamber music": Haruna Shinoyama (Japan)
- Special prize, "Kronberg Academy": Ziyu He (China)

2019 – 10th International Violin Competition Leopold Mozart:

- 1st prize (Mozart Prize): Joshua Brown (USA)
- 2nd prize: Karisa Chiu (USA)
- 3rd prize: Kaoru Oe (Japan)
- Special prize "Commissioned Piece": Kaoru Oe (Japan)
- Special prize "Chamber Music": Simon Wiener (Switzerland)
- Special prize from the Critic's Jury: Simon Wiener (Switzerland)
- Audience prize: Joshua Brown (USA)
- Special prize "CD-production": Joshua Brown (USA)
- Youth Development prize: Hyojin Kan (South Korea), Naoko Nakajima (Japan/USA), Hsin-Yu Shih (Taiwan), Sara Zeneli (Italy)
- Special prize "Kronberg Academy": Joshua Brown (USA)
- Special prize by Jury Chairman Benjamin Schmid: Joshua Brown (USA)

== Honorary presidents and artistic directors ==
Year	Honorary president	Artistic Director
1987	–	Klaus Volk
1991	Yehudi Menuhin	Harry Oesterle
1995	Igor Oistrach	Christian Pyhrr
1999	Tibor Varga	Christian Pyhrr
2003	Gidon Kremer	Christian Pyhrr/Julius Berger
2006	Gidon Kremer	Julius Berger
2009	Gidon Kremer	Julius Berger
2013	Bruno Weil	Julius Berger
2016	Igor Ozim	Petru Munteanu
2019	Salvatore Accardo	Linus Roth

== Commissioned pieces ==
- Rodion Shchedrin (born 1932), "Variations and Theme", Schott Music International, premiere November 21, 1999, 4th Violin Competition 1999
- Wilfried Hiller (born 1941), "Ophelia", Schott Music International, premiere November 24, 2003, 5th Violin Competition 2003
- Viktor Suslin (1942–2012), "1756", Sikorski, premiere May 27, 2006, 6th Violin Competition 2006
- Frangis Ali-Sade (born 1947), "Dastan", Sikorski, premiere May 23, 2009, 7th Violin Competition 2009
- Johannes X. Schachtner (born 1985), "Florilegium – Homage to Leopold Mozart" for solo violin solo, Sikorski, premiere May 13, 2016, 9th Violin Competition 2016
- Elżbieta Sikora (born 1943), "SOLEOS" for solo violin and electronics, premiere June 1, 2019, 10th Violin Competition 2019

== Special edition ==
- Ignaz von Beecke (1733–1803), Piano Trio in C major, Edition Hammer, first performance on April 27, 2013, 8th Violin Competition 2013
- Franz Xaver Kleinheinz (1765–1832), Trio for Pianoforte, Violin and Cello, first performance on May 13, 2016, 9th Violin Competition 2016

== CD productions ==
- Suyeon Kim, 1st prize winner 2003, Bavarian Chamber Philharmonic conducted by Pietari Inkinen. Wolfgang Amadeus Mozart: Concerto for Violin and Orchestra in D major, KV 218, Symphony No. 8 in D major, KV 48 / Karl Amadeus Hartmann: Suite No. 2 for Solo Violin, Concerto funèbre for Violin and Strings (OehmsClassics OC 512).
- Yura Lee, 1st prize winner 2006, Bavarian Chamber Philharmonic conducted by Reinhard Goebel. Johann Christian Bach: Sinfonia in D major (Overture to "Amadis de Gaule", Paris 1779) / Simon Le Duc: Symphony in E-flat major / Chevalier de Saint-Georges: Concerto in G major op. 2 No. 1 / Pierre-Montan Berton L'Ainé: Chaconne in E minor / Wolfgang Amadeus Mozart: "Parisian" Symphony in D major KV 297 (OehmsClassics OC 705).
- Friederike Starkloff, 2nd prize winner 2009, Josè Gallardo (piano). Wolfgang Amadeus Mozart: Sonata in F major KV 377, Sonata in B-flat major KV 454, Sonata in A major KV 526 / Mozart-Kreisler: Rondo, Allegretto, from Haffner-Serenade KV 250 (OehmsClassics OC 756).
- Maia Cabeza, 1st prize winner 2013, José Gallardo (piano), Liga Skride (Cembalo), CONCERTINO Ensemble conducted by Dirk Kaftan. Wolfgang Amadeus Mozart: Sonata for Violin and Piano in D major KV 306, Adagio E major KV 261, Rondo C major KV 373 / Alfred Schnittke: Fuguee for solo violin 1953, Sonata for Violin and Chamber Orchestra 1963/68 (OehmsClassics OC 766).
- Ji Won Song, 1st prize winner 2016, José Gallardo (piano). Wolfgang Amadeus Mozart: Sonata in E-flat major, KV 481, Sonata in F major, KV 376 / Ludwig van Beethoven: Romance in F major, op. 50, Rondo G major, WoO 41 / Fritz Kreisler: Rondino on a theme of Beethoven / Pablo de Sarasate: Fantasy on Mozart's Magic Flute.

== Films ==
- Eingetaucht in die Ewigkeit, Augsburg – die bayerische Mozartstadt, a film documentation by Bernhard Graf, Bavarian Radio, 2011, tracing Leopold Mozart and his ancestors.
- Mozart – die wahre Geschichte, a film documentation by Bernhard Graf, Bavarian Radio, 2012, docudrama about Leopold Mozart, his famous son and his ancestors.

== Literature ==
- "25 Jahre Leopold-Mozart-Kuratorium Augsburg e.V.", Anniversary publication, Leopold Mozart-Kuratorium Augsburg e.V.
- Leopold Mozart, Versuch einer gründlichen Violinschule, entworfen und mit 4 Kupfertafeln sammt einer Tabelle versehen von Leopold Mozart, Hochfürstl. Salzburgischen Kammermusikus, in Verlag des Verfassers, Augspurg, gedruckt bey Johann Jacob Lotter, 1756.
- Leopold Mozart, Versuch einer gründlichen Violinschule, facsimile reprint of the first edition 1756, edited by Greta Moens-Haenen, Bärenreiter, Kassel etc., third edition 2005.
- Leopold Mozart, Gründliche Violinschule, facsimile reproduction of the third edition, Augsburg 1789, Breitkopf & Härtel, Wiesbaden 1991.
- Leopold Mozart, Gründliche Violinschule, first issue of the second edition from 1769 in modern typeface and spelling, Kulturverlag Polzer, Salzburg 2007.
- Cliff Eisen, Leopold-Mozart-Werkverzeichnis (LMV) [Leopold Mozart Catalog] (contributions to Leopold Mozart Research 4), Wißner Publications, Augsburg 2010.
- Ernst Fritz Schmid, Ein schwäbisches Mozart-Buch [A Swabian Mozart Book], Wißner Publications, Augsburg, second edition 1998.
- Ernst Fritz Schmid, "Leopold Mozart (1719–1787)", in: Lebensbilder aus dem Bayerischen Schwaben 3 [Portraits from Bavarian Swabia 3], Götz von Pöllnitz, ed. Hueber, München 1954, pp. 346–368.
- Adolf Layer, Eine Jugend in Augsburg. Leopold Mozart 1719–1737, [A Youth in Augsburg, Leopold Mozart 1719–1737] Die Brigg Publishers, Augsburg 1975.
- Erich Valentin, Leopold Mozart, Porträt einer Persönlichkeit [Portrait of a personality], Paul List Publishers, München 1987.
- Josef Mančal/Wolfgang Plath (editors), Leopold Mozart. Auf dem Weg zu einem Verständnis [Toward an understanding], Beiträge zur Leopold-Mozart-Forschung 1 [contributions to Leopold Mozart Research 1], Wißner Publications, Augsburg 1994.
- Wolfgang Plath, "Leopold Mozart", in: Neue Deutsche Biographie (NDB), Band 18, New German Biography, vol. 18 Duncker & Humblot, Berlin 1997, pp. 238–240.
- Martin Kluger, W. A. Mozart und Augsburg. Vorfahren, Vaterstadt und erste Liebe [W. A. Mozart and Augsburg. Forebears, hometown and first love], context publishers, Augsburg 2007.
