= Sonja Korkeala =

Finnish violinist (born 1969)

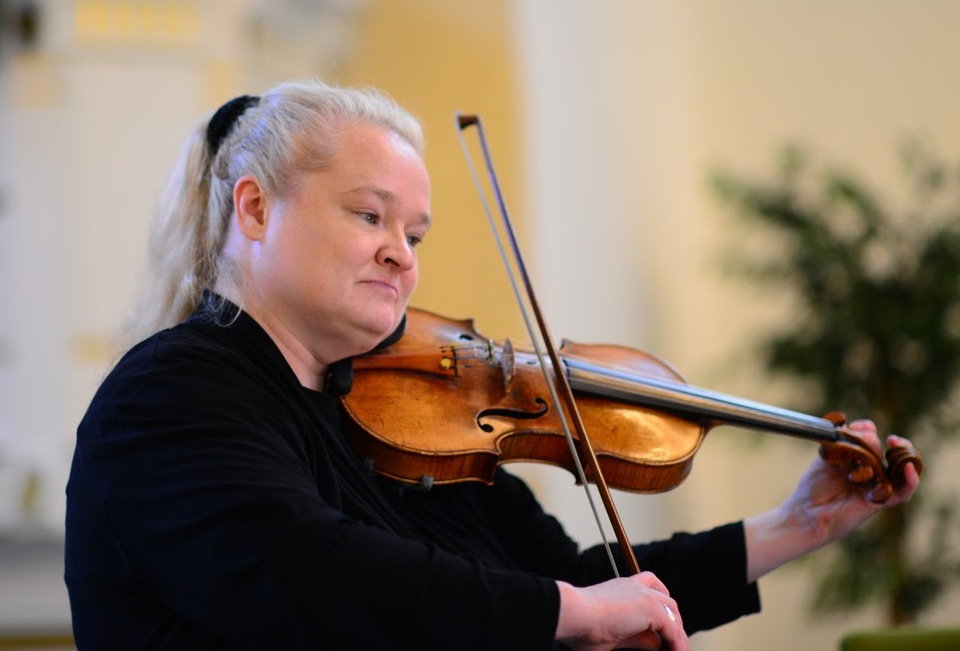
Sonja Korkeala (2015)

Sonja Korkeala (born 1969 in Oulu) is a Finnish violinist and professor at the University of Music and Performing Arts Munich.

== Biography ==
She studied at the Sibelius Academy in Helsinki with Ari Angervo and Tuomas Haapanen and at the Liszt Academy in Budapest with Maria Vermes. Korkeala continued her studies with Ana Chumachenco at the University of Music and Performing Arts Munich where she finished her studies with the masterclass degree.

== Prizes ==
- 1984: Concertino Praga (with Katinka Korkeala)
- 1988: Rodolfo Lipizer Prize Gorizia (Italy)
- 1991: Konzertgesellschaft München

== Teaching ==
In 1994, she became assistant teacher of Ana Chumchenco at the University of Music and Performing Arts Munich, then since 2000 she has taught her own class. Since 2011, she is professor at the same institute. She made a name for herself as teacher of highly gifted young violinists.

Since 1993, Korkeala is the Primaria of the Rodin Quartet. This Quartet recorded many CDs, among others the complete works for string quartet by Franz Lachner, Vinzenz Lachner and Ignaz Lachner as first recording.

In cooperation with her twin sister Katinka, who founded the festival in 1999, Sonja Korkeala is artistic director of the Kimito Island Music Festival. The weeklong festival is held annually on Kimito Island in mid-July. Among other performances, the festival annually features a premiere of a piece commissioned for the event by Finnish composers, including Aulis Sallinen, Kalevi Aho, Jouni Kaipainen and Einojuhani Rautavaara.
