= Isabelle Faust =

German violinist (born 1972)

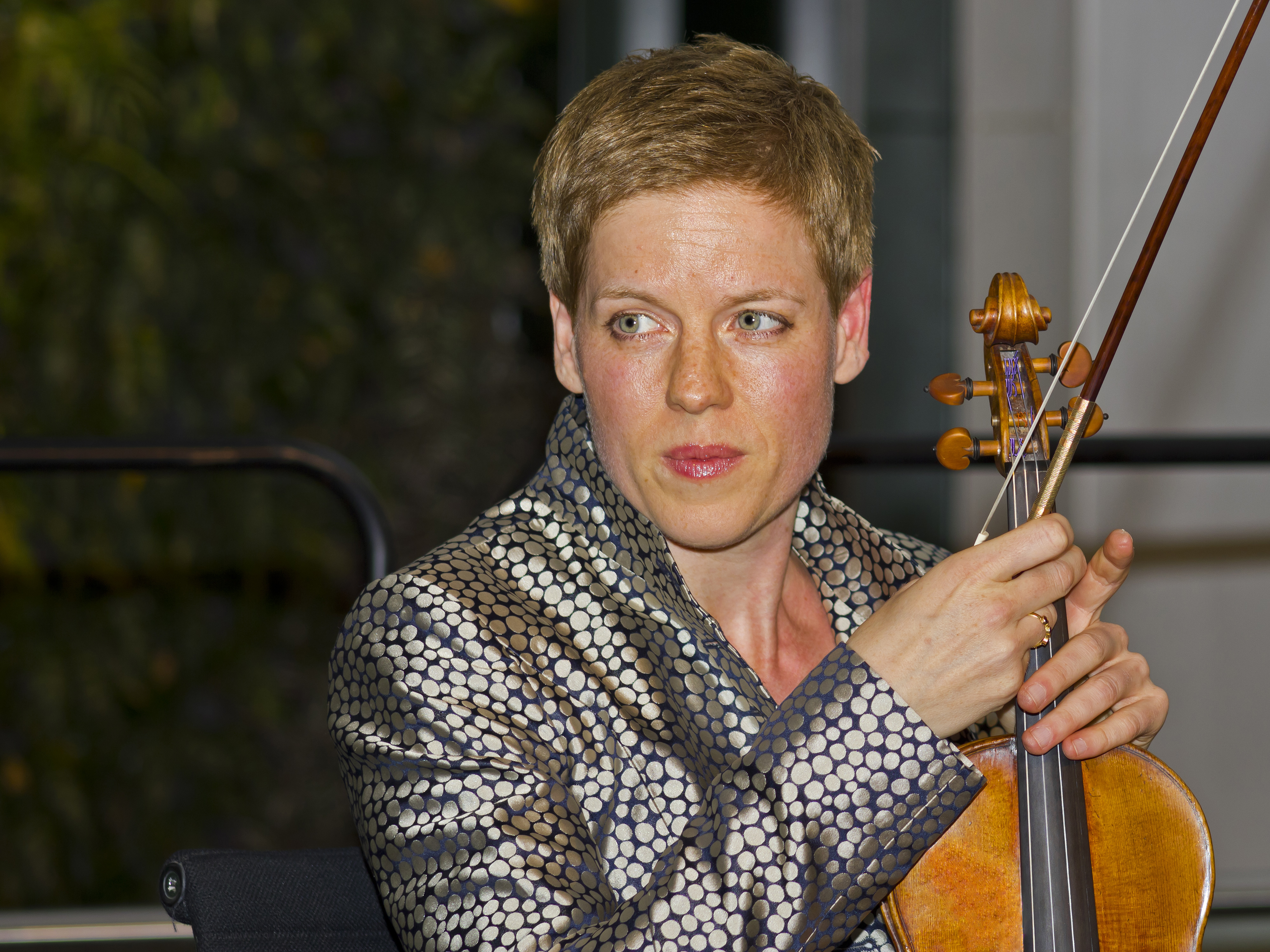
- Faust in 2012
- Born: 19 March 1972 (age 54); Esslingen
- Occupations: Classical violinist; Academic teacher
- Organizations: Berlin University of the Arts
- Awards: Gramophone Award; Cannes Classical Award; Diapason d'Or

Isabelle Faust (born 19 March 1972) is a German violinist who has worked internationally as a soloist and chamber musician. She has received multiple awards.

== Life and career ==
Faust was born in Esslingen am Neckar, Baden-Württemberg, on 12 March 1972. She received her first violin lessons at age five. Her father, then a 31-year-old secondary school teacher, decided to learn the violin. He took his daughter along: his talent was not especially stellar, but his daughter learned the technical fundamentals of violin playing correctly at an unusually early age, quickly becoming the star pupil. Shortly after that her brother also began to take lessons and when Isabelle was 11 the parents created a family string quartet for which several masterclasses were later organised with some of the leading string players of the time. The early start was for both children the basis for musical careers; Boris Faust is a professional violist.

...on Bach's six unaccompanied Sonatas and Partitas: In a way, this repertoire is the most difficult ... I mean, the huge C major fugue! To enter this kind of music and not only understand it intellectually but also emotionally? It's sometimes almost strange to go on stage. It feels complete, what you do, the two of you. ... I've always wondered: did Bach really mean for them to be played in public? I have my doubts.

Isabelle Faust interviewed by Anna Picard in 2013

Faust trained with Christoph Poppen and Dénes Zsigmondy. After winning the Paganini Competition, and keen to broaden her experience, she moved in 1996 to Paris, where she lived for the next nine years. There she recorded her first album, featuring music by Béla Bartók. She attracted plaudits as an interpreter of Gabriel Fauré. Faust later said that it probably did no harm to her career that, because of her French first name, many French listeners assumed she was French. It was also in France that she met her husband.

In 2004 Faust was appointed professor of violin at the Berlin University of the Arts. She lives in Berlin and has a son. Since 1996, she has performed on the "Sleeping Beauty" Stradivarius violin of 1704, on loan from Landesbank Baden-Württemberg. She has also performed with Baroque-style violins and bows.

Faust has performed as guest soloist with most of the world's major orchestras. In addition to the recordings listed under "Awards and Prizes," she has recorded works of Ludwig van Beethoven, Antonín Dvořák, Robert Schumann, Franz Schubert, Johannes Brahms (including the Violin Concerto), Alban Berg, Bohuslav Martinů, André Jolivet and others. She is a proponent of new music and has given world premieres of works by, among others, Olivier Messiaen, Werner Egk, Péter Eötvös, and Jörg Widmann. James R. Oestreich of The New York Times counted her recording of Mozart's violin concertos among the best recordings of 2016.

== Awards and prizes ==
- 1987: International Violin Competition Leopold Mozart in Augsburg, First Prize
- 1990: Premio Quadrivio Competition (Rovigo, Italy), First Prize
- 1993: Paganini Competition in Genoa, Italy, First Prize
- 1994: Förderpreis des Landes Nordrhein-Westfalen für junge Künstlerinnen und Künstler
- 1997: Gramophone Award for "Young Artist of the Year" for her first CD, the Sonata for Solo Violin and the Violin Sonata No. 1 of Béla Bartók on Harmonia Mundi
- 2002: Cannes Classical Award for her recording for ECM of the Concerto Funèbre of Karl Amadeus Hartmann
- 2010: Diapason d'Or de l'Année for her recording of the Sonatas and Partitas for solo violin of Johann Sebastian Bach for Harmonia Mundi
- 2012: Gramophone Award for Best Chamber Recording for her recording of the violin sonatas of Ludwig van Beethoven with pianist Alexander Melnikov for Harmonia Mundi
- 2012: Echo Klassik Award for her recording of the violin sonatas of Ludwig van Beethoven with pianist Alexander Melnikov for Harmonia Mundi
- 2012: Diapason d'Or for her recording of the violin sonatas of Ludwig van Beethoven with pianist Alexander Melnikov
- 2013: International Classical Music Awards for her recording of the first three Sonatas and Partitas for solo violin of Johann Sebastian Bach for Harmonia Mundi
- 2016: International Classical Music Awards for her recording of the violin sonatas of Johannes Brahms, Robert Schumann and Albert Dietrich with pianist Alexander Melnikov for Harmonia Mundi
- 2017: Gramophone Award for Best Concerto Recording and Recording of the Year for her recording of the violin concertos of Wolfgang Amadeus Mozart with Il Giardino Armonico and Giovanni Antonini for Harmonia Mundi
