= Tollwood Festival =

Festival held in Munich, Germany

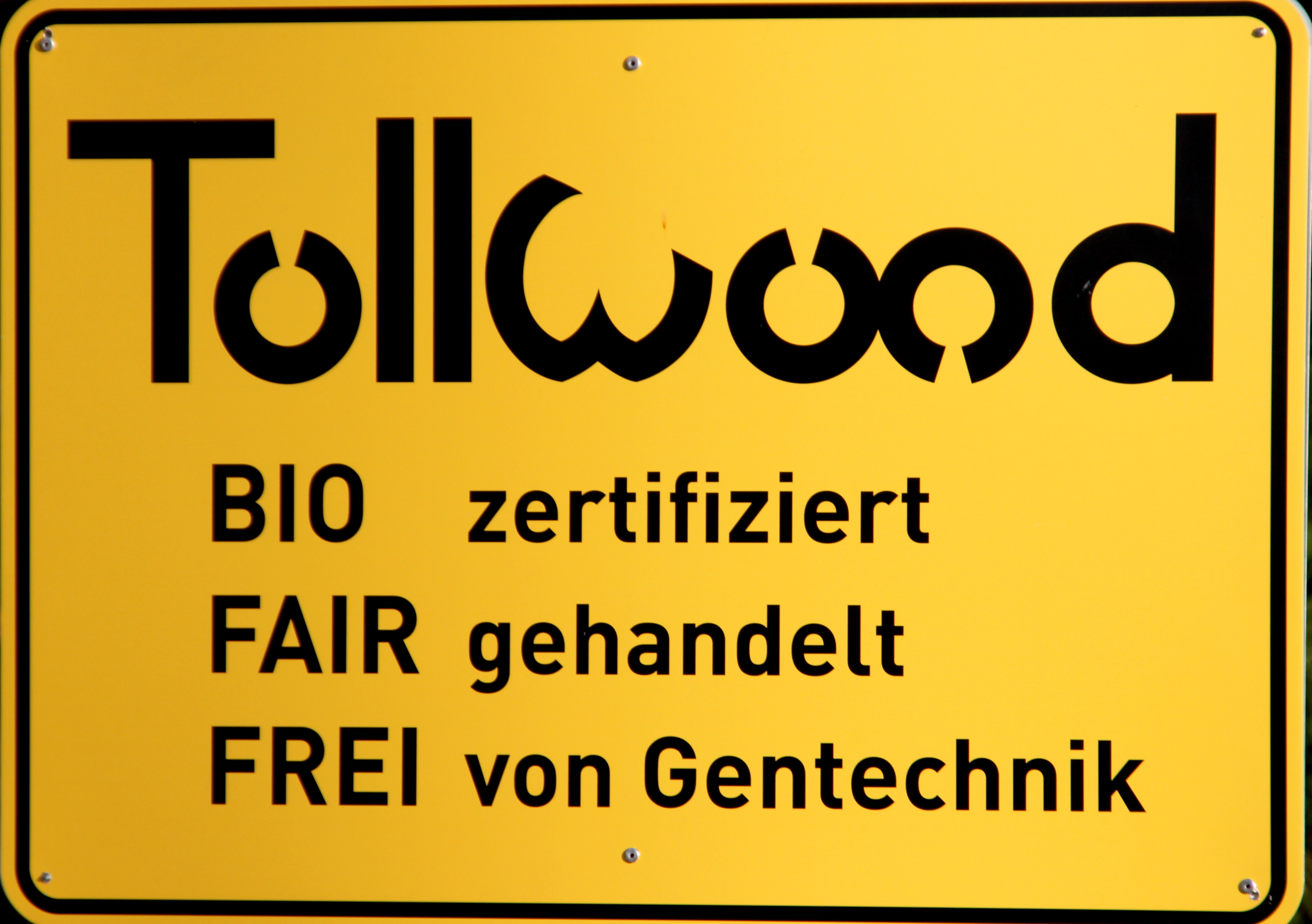

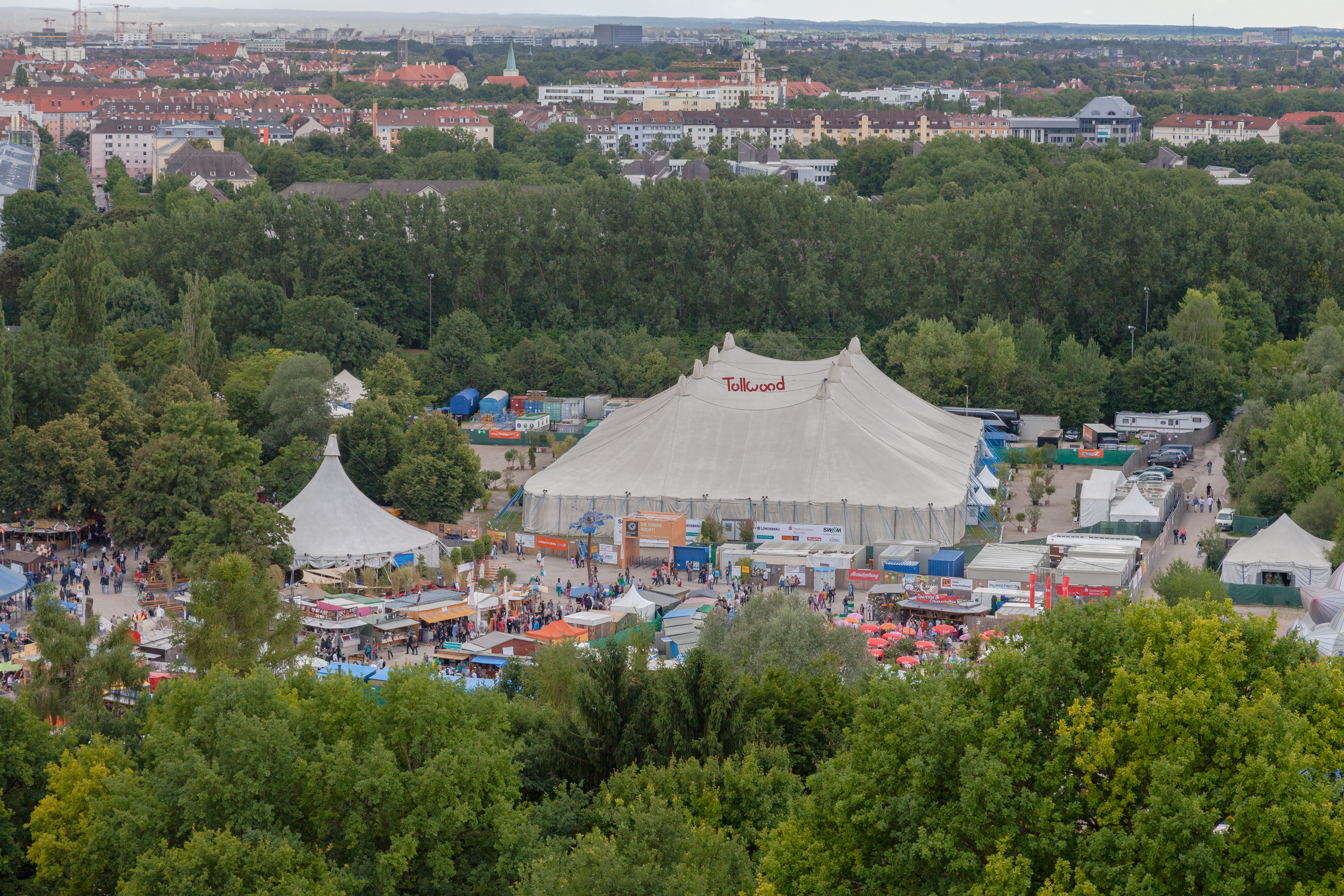
General view

The Tollwood Festival is a festival which takes place semi-annually in the Olympiapark (summer) or on the Theresienwiese (winter) in Munich.

== History ==
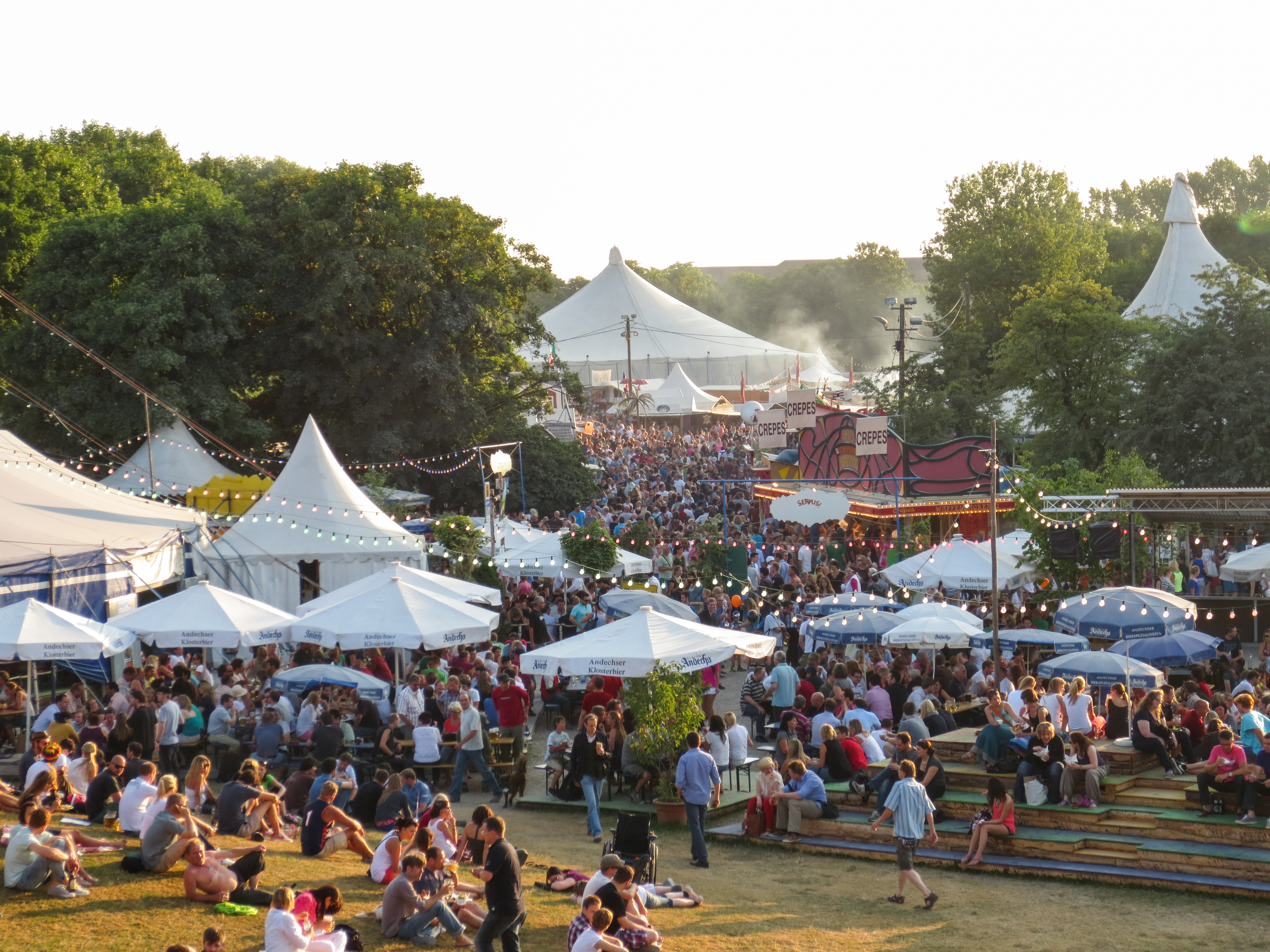
Tents at the Tollwood summer festival 2013

The first Tollwood Festival was held on the southern grounds of the Olympiapark in the summer of 1988. At the first Tollwood Festival from 1–11 July 1988, appearances were made by local artists such as Konstantin Wecker and Biermösl Blosn. Starting in 1991, more international artists participated. Since 1991, in addition to the summer festival the first winter festival was held, which since 2000 takes place on the Theresienwiese. In 1999, the winter festival suffered severe damages from a winter storm at its site on Arnulfstraße in late December.

== Description ==
Tollwood Festival is organized by the Tollwood GmbH. The festival takes place on approximately 30,000-meter^{2} ground area. It has around 900,000 visitors in summer and in winter about 600,000. Financing is covered by approximately 40% from ticket sales, 40% of the rental income on stand operators and 20% from sponsors. Government grants are not included.

Special features of the festival were the marketplace of ideas, the ecological gastronomy festival and the cultural program of music, various forms of theater, performances and visual art. The festival featured a wide range of musical styles such as rock, singer-songwriters, jazz and blues. Furthermore, theatrical and artistic performances were also held.

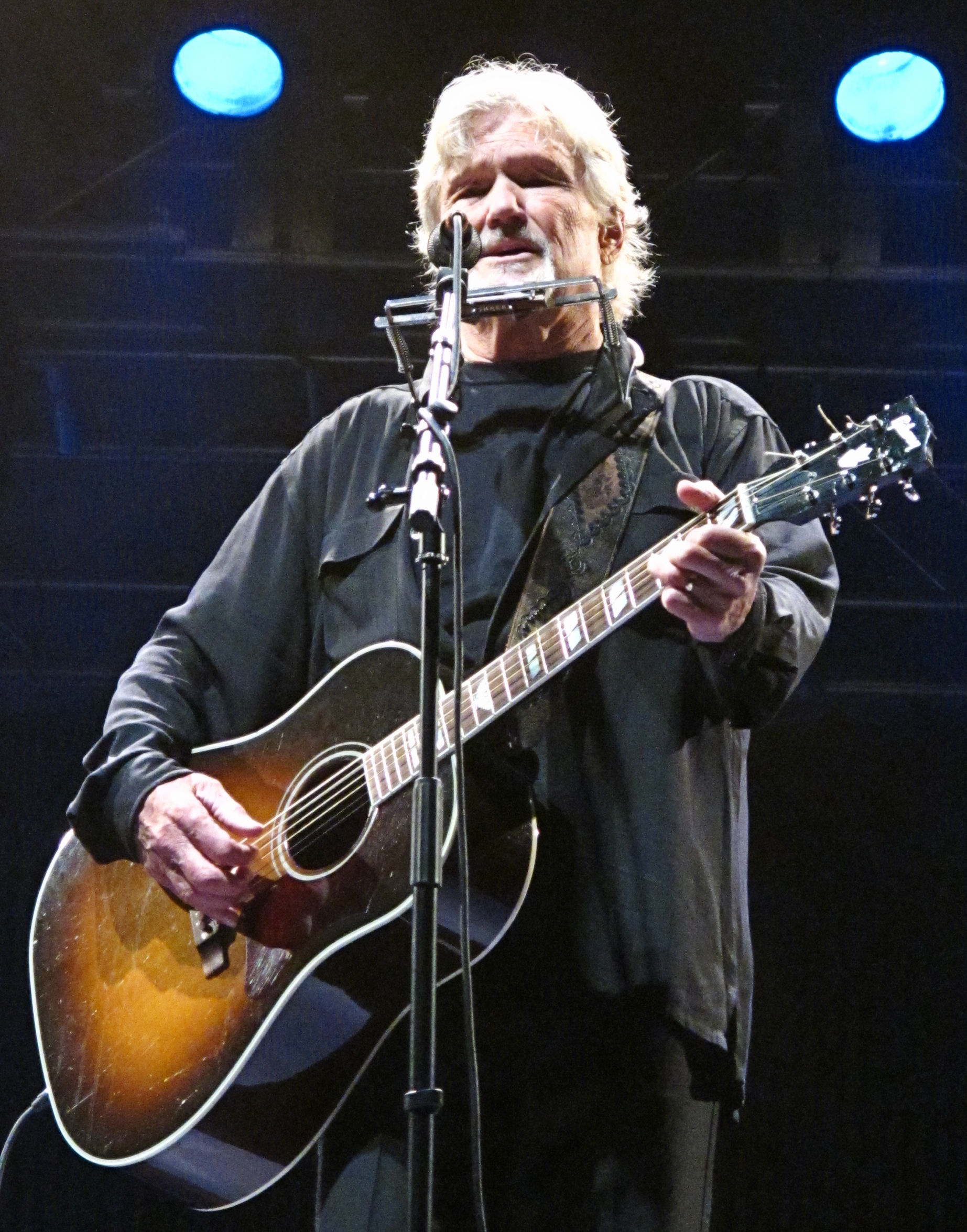
Kris Kristofferson, 2010, Music Arena

Since 1988, the Tollwood festival focuses on different contents and takes a different forms and genres each year. The festival attempts to connect the cultural offerings of music, theater, cabaret and art with an ecological consciousness. Here, a large part of the cultural events that take place offer free admission.

The festival sees itself as a forum for ecology and environmental awareness. It wants to serve as a platform for important topics in this area and provide a catalyst for environmental projects. This entails the organic certification of the gastronomy festival since winter 2003 and the "Bio for children" action, that the Tollwood developed in 2006, in cooperation with the Department of Health and Environment of the City of Munich. There is also a commitment to healthier mobile telephony and sustainability. Program highlights are seasonal selected by the festival.

In cooperation with Deutsche Tierschutzbund e.V. (German Animal Welfare Society), Tollwood campaigns for an end to the intensive animal farming.

== Summer festival ==
The summer festival extends over 25 days in June and July and takes place in the southern Olympiapark. These include 50 dining establishments and over 200 stalls selling handicrafts. At the beginning only the part between the East-West Peace Church and the Spiridon-Louis-Ring was used. There is a theater and performance program and performances from international musicians. Performances so far at the festivals include those from Miriam Makeba, Lou Reed, Roxette, Bob Dylan, Kris Kristofferson, Milow, Amy Macdonald, Angelo Branduardi, Hubert von Goisern, Hans Söllner, Hannes Wader, Konstantin Wecker, Gary Moore, Joan Baez, Wolfgang Ambros, Marianne Faithfull, Manfred Mann, Jethro Tull, Foreigner, Toto, BAP and Emerson, Lake & Palmer. Due to noise control reasons, the live music events usually end by 11 pm. The discos are equipped with limiters.

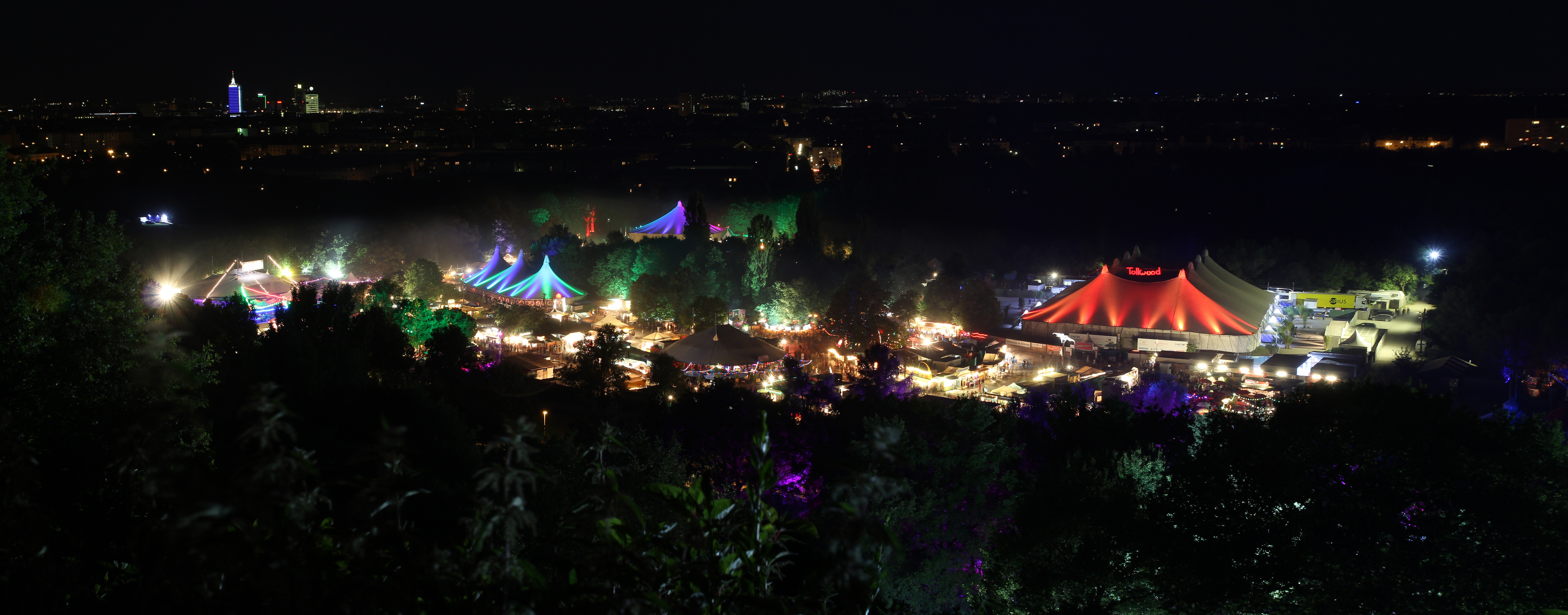
Look at the late-night summer festival, 2013

== Winter festival ==
In addition to the summer festival, Wintertollwood is held since 1991. Originally located at the site of the former container terminal in Arnulfstrasse since the year 2000 Tollwood winter festival takes place on Theresienwiese. It starts just before the first Sunday of Advent, and has its own Christmas market, which lasts until 23 December. The cultural events take place up to and including New Year. The program consists of theater, "Markt der Ideen" (marketplace of ideas) and "Weltsalon".

The "Weltsalon"' is a platform for social and environmental issues with a focus on the fascination of earth, environmental protection and social commitment. In recent years, speakers included among others Ernst Ulrich von Weizsäcker, Amy Goodman, Bob Geldof, Edgar Reitz and Arved Fuchs.

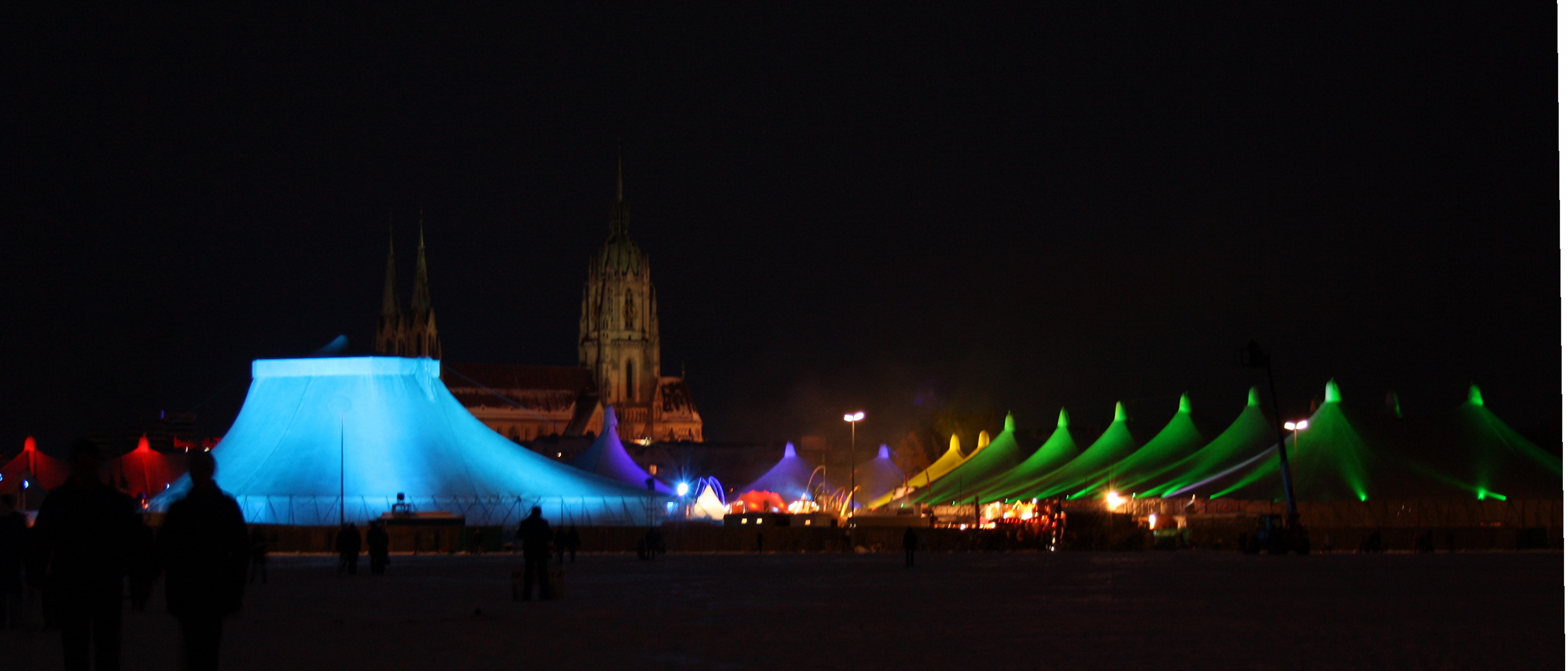
Tollwood winter festival, 2010
