= Donald Knaack =

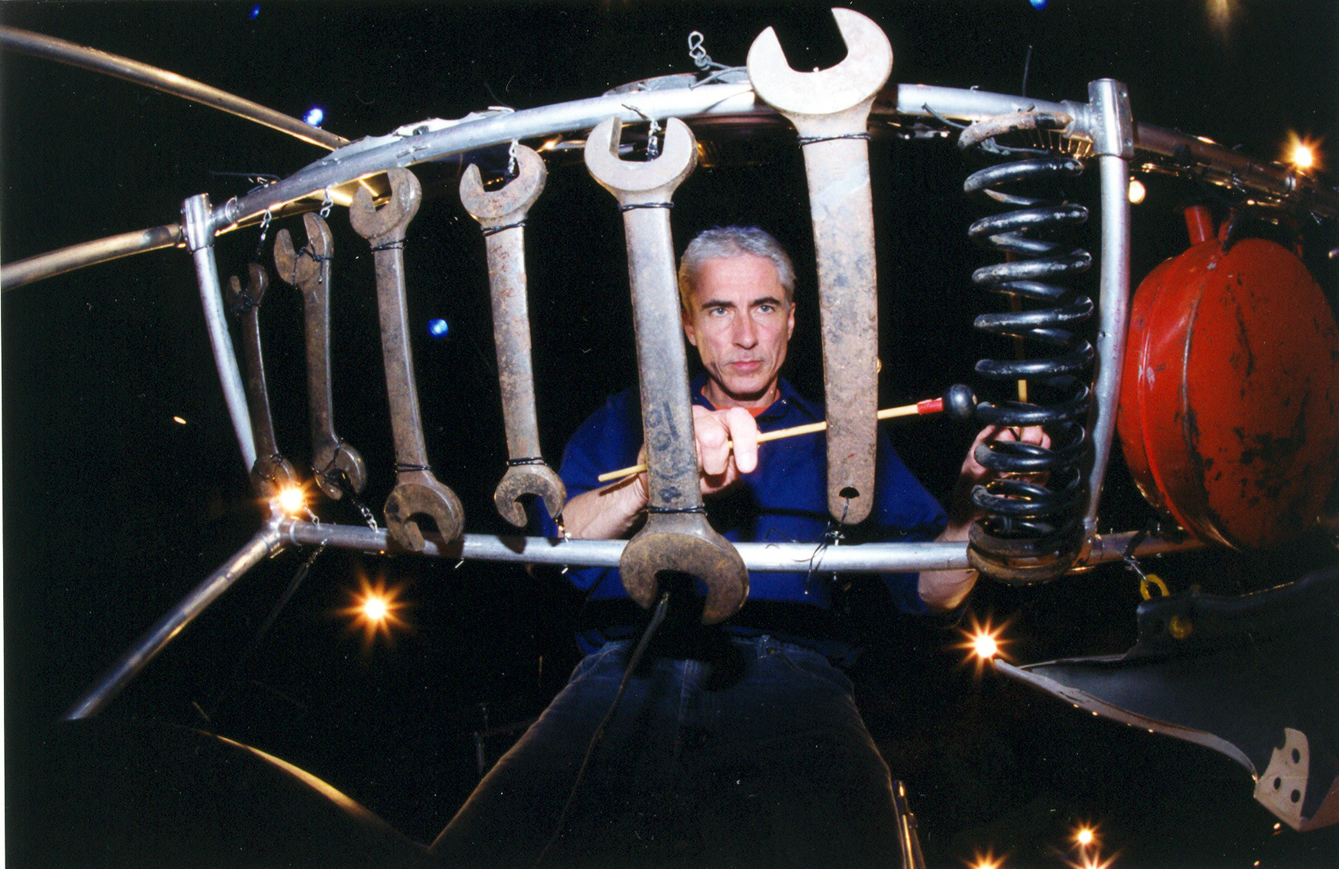

Background information
- Genres: Experimental; Dance; World Fusion; Avant-garde; Art rock
- Occupation: Musician
- Instrument: Recycled Materials as instruments of percussion music
- Website: www.junkmusic.org

Donald Knaack is an American percussionist. He performs on and composes for recycled materials exclusively.

His album Junk Music was nominated for a Grammy Award, and he has played in many prominent venues worldwide, including the Lincoln Center, the Kennedy Center, the Vans Warped Tour, the Sundance Film Festival, the Burlington Discover Jazz Festival, the Kansas City International Jazz Festival and more.

== Biography ==
Donald Knaack (aka The Junkman) is a classically trained percussionist and composer who has used recycled materials as his instruments of music since long before the eco-green movement was cool. He calls it Junk Music and it all began with his mentor and collaborator, John Cage encouraged the further development of his attraction to the sounds of found objects. He's performed at Lincoln Center, The Van's Warped Tour (with Eminem, Black Eyed Peas and Blink-182), The United Nations, The Kennedy Center, Sundance Film Festival, concerts with Phish, Seoul Drum Festival, Summer Series Dubai, many schools and colleges and a solo concert at the United Nations' COP 16 Conference on Climate Change in Cancun, Mexico, where he was awarded the "Cantando por el Planeta" award by the Federal Government of Mexico for is HOP (Help Our Planet) environmental education program for schools. His HOP program was also a recipient of the Vermont Governor's Award for Environmental Excellence.

His music has been used in major television commercials for The NBA, ESPN and Electronic Arts. He and his music have been featured on Late Night with Conan O'Brien, CBS Sunday Morning, CBS News, National Public Radio, BBC, Associated Press and a front-page story in Billboard. He will be featured in an upcoming issue of Disney's Family Fun magazine.

He is currently developing and producing a children's television show about music and the environment called Junk Music with The Junkman, and has a new, one man musical/visual/theatrical extravaganza entitled BEAT IT! with The Junkman.

He recently completed a 2 1/2 week tour in Alaska sponsored by the US Environmental Protection Agency. In 2013 2K Sports released its latest NBA game, NBA2K13, featuring the music of The Junkman.

The Junkman celebrates Earth Day every year with a Global Junkjam with students and musicians all over the world through Google Plus Hangouts.

== Discography ==
- 1966 – 1970: 22 recordings of contemporary music as a percussionist in The Louisville Orchestra – Louisville Orchestra Masterworks/Columbia
- 1974: Percussionist on Rothko Chapel/Morton Feldman – Columbia Records
- 1977: Cage/Duchamp (First Recordings, Solo percussion album) – Atlantic/Finnadar Records
- 1978: Three Constructions of John Cage (The Donald Knaack Percussion Ensemble) – Tomato Records
- 1980: Inside the Plastic Lotus (Duo recording with Peggy Knaack) – Hat Hut Records
- 1982: Dance Music (Solo Recording) – RRRecords
- 1998: Junk Music (Solo recording) – Moo Records
- 2004: Junk Music 2 (Solo recording) – Moo Records
- 2011: Nat Res + Mo Na + Man (Natural Resources + Mother Nature + Man) (The Junkman™ and friends – Click here for full credits) – Moo Records

== Works ==
- 2000: Surfer at the River Styx – commissioned for The Kennedy Center & American Dance Festival and choreographer Twyla Tharp.
- 2003: The Environmental Continuum – concerto for recycled materials and orchestra commissioned for the Eastern Music Festival, Louisville Youth Orchestra and Mansfield Symphony Youth Orchestra.
- 2006: Odin: The Opera – opera for spoken word and 10 recycled materials percussionists that premiered at New York University's Loewe Theatre.
- 2007: The Lost Civilization – musical featuring dramatic elements, traditional and recycled materials instruments and recorded content that premiered at Burr & Burton Academy in Manchester, VT.
