= LYO =

LYO may refer to:

- Leeds Youth Opera
- Louisiana Youth Orchestras
- Louisville Youth Orchestra
- Lubavitch Youth Organization

== See also ==
- Lyø
