= Anna Barsukova (filmmaker) =

Russian film director and screenwriter

Anna Barsukova Анна Барсукова
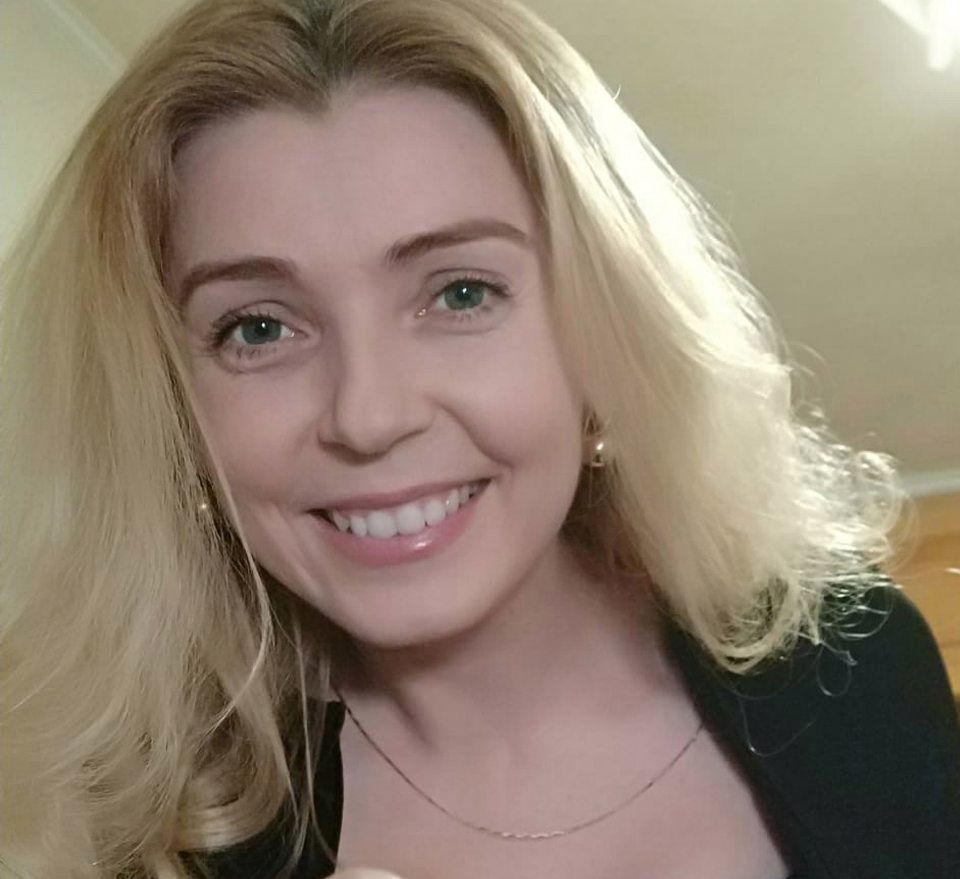
- Film director Anna Barsukova
- Born: Anna Vitalyevna Barsukova; 7 October 1981 (age 45); Nikopol, Dnepropetrovsk region, Ukrainian SSR, Soviet Union
- Occupations: Filmmaker, film director, camerawoman, screenwriter, film producer, musician
- Website: www.annabarsukova.com

Anna Vitalyevna Barsukova (Russian: Анна Витальевна Барсуко́ва; born 7 October 1981) "(maiden name — Sidorenko)" is a Russian film director, screenwriter, camerawoman and musician. She is a member of the Russian Union of Cinematographers (since 2019), the International Society for Women in Film & Television in Vancouver (WIFTV), and the Guild of Documentary Films and Television. She authored and directed documentaries You Are Not Alone! (Russian: "Ты не один!"), and Voice for the Voiceless (Russian: "Голос за безгласных") about the social stereotypes and discrimination against HIV-positive people(music composer: Guli Kambarova)

== Biography ==
Born on 7 October 1981 in the city of Nikopol, Dnepropetrovsk region, Ukrainian SSR, Anna Barsukova was active in sports and music since early childhood. She competed for prizes in rhythmic gymnastics contests and won first prizes in regional violin competitions. In 2006, after completing her studies at the Academy of Music as a violinist and symphony orchestra conductor, Anna earned a higher education degree in music from the Rostov State Rachmaninoff Conservatory in Russia. As a musician she collaborated with many accomplished composers and musicians of our times including Yuri Bashmet, Sergey Yakovenko, Gyuli Kambarova, Oleg Bezuglov and Giya Kancheli.
In 2016, Anna received a secondary education and became a film director. She graduated with honors.

== Filmography ==
- 2016 Broken Path, short feature film
- 2017 You Are Not Alone, documentary short film
- 2019 Voice for the Voiceless documentary short film
- 2023 Fine Line documentary

== Awards ==
- 2019 Voice for the Voiceless

(selectively)

Festival	Award
Open festival of debuts "Magic of cinema" (Odintsovo, Russia)	GRAND PRIX (Chairman Egor Konchalovsky)
International festival "ZILANT" (Kazan, Russia)	Best social film
International festival "Fathers and children"	Winner
Whistleblower Summit & Film Festival (Washington, USA)	Finalist, "'Film premiered in the United States on August 1, 2019"'
Chhatrapati Shivaji International Film Festival 2019 (Pune, India)	Award Winner in the Best concept category»
KinoDUEL international film festival (Minsk, Belarus)	Winner's Prize for " the most life-affirming film»
Saint Vladimir Film Festival (Sevastopol, Crimea)	Special prize of the Odyssey Foundation»
Changing Face International Film Festival (Sydney, Australia)	Finalist, " 'TV premiere in Australia on March 26, 2020"'
Award "for the good of peace" (Moscow, Russia)	Finalist
JellyFEST (Los Angeles, USA)	Semi-finalist
Courage Film Festival (Berlin, Germany)	Polufinale

* 2017 You Are Not Alone (selectively)

Festival	Award
Picture this... (Calgary, Canada)	GRAND PRIX (in the category of short documentaries)
Special program "Eternal values" XXVIII OFDC " RUSSIA "(Yekaterinburg, Russia)	Main prize
Bereginya international festival (Arkhangelsk)	Winner of the first degree
Open all-Russian festival "Magic of cinema" (Odintsovo, Russia)	Winner of the first degree
International festival " CINEMA CAMP "(Kazan, Russia)	"Best documentary"
International festival "Fathers and children "(Orel, Russia)	Winner of the "Best film on a social theme" Movie Music award
Regional independent award "Yug-Expert" (Rostov-on-Don)	Finalist of the contest-the Best social project of the South of Russia; 2017 in the category "Family Support"
All-Russian competition of centers and programs of parental education (Moscow, Russia)	Prize "For the promotion of family values by cinematography"
XIII international Sretensky Orthodox film festival "Meeting" (Obninsk, Russia)	Winner

* 2016 Broken Path

Festival	Award
VII Open festival of social advertising "Choose life" (Yekaterinburg)	Winner in the category "Public recognition"
Open festival"My Land" (Rostov-on-Don)	Best feature film; Best sound engineering; Best cinematography; Best acting (awarded to Olga Zharova)

== Media publications ==
(selectively)

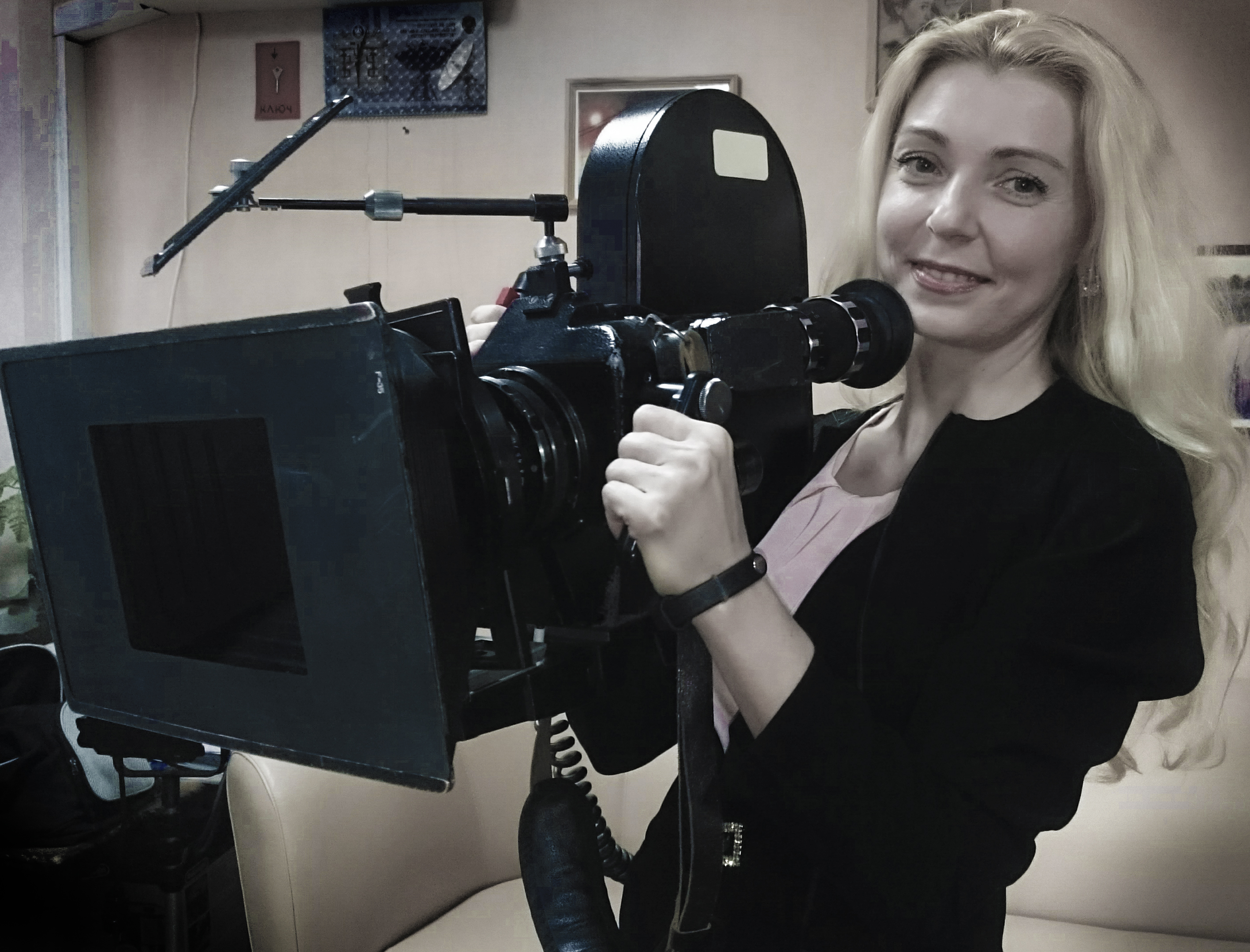
Anna Barsukova-cinematograph

- Moscow Director Anna Barsukova presented a film about HIV in Khanty-Mansiysk
- Ugra TV channel about the film Voice for the Voiceless
- Screening of the film "Voice for the Voiceless" in the framework of the festival "Spirit of fire" – TV Ugra report
- THE ZNAMYA CINEMA WILL SHOW THE SOCIALLY SIGNIFICANT FILM "VOICE FOR THE VOICELESS"
- The Rostov house of cinema hosted the premiere screening of the documentary "You Are Not Alone!"
- Rostov-on-don. Premiere of the documentary "You Are Not Alone!"
- Anna Barsukova: "No one wanted to reveal their secret"
- I have HIV: how the story of a girl with a" shameful " diagnosis became the script of a documentary
- The Odyssey Foundation supported the Serbs and the Director of Voice for the Voiceless
- Actress Olga Budina told "Around TV" about her participation in the film "Voice for the Voiceless" — dir. Anna Barsukova
- Why making a film about HIV in Yekaterinburg turned out to be a problem
- Premiere on RUSTALK TV — Voice for the Voiceless
- Director Anna Barsukova will come to Khanty-Mansiysk with her film
