= Luz Leskowitz =

Austrian classical violinist

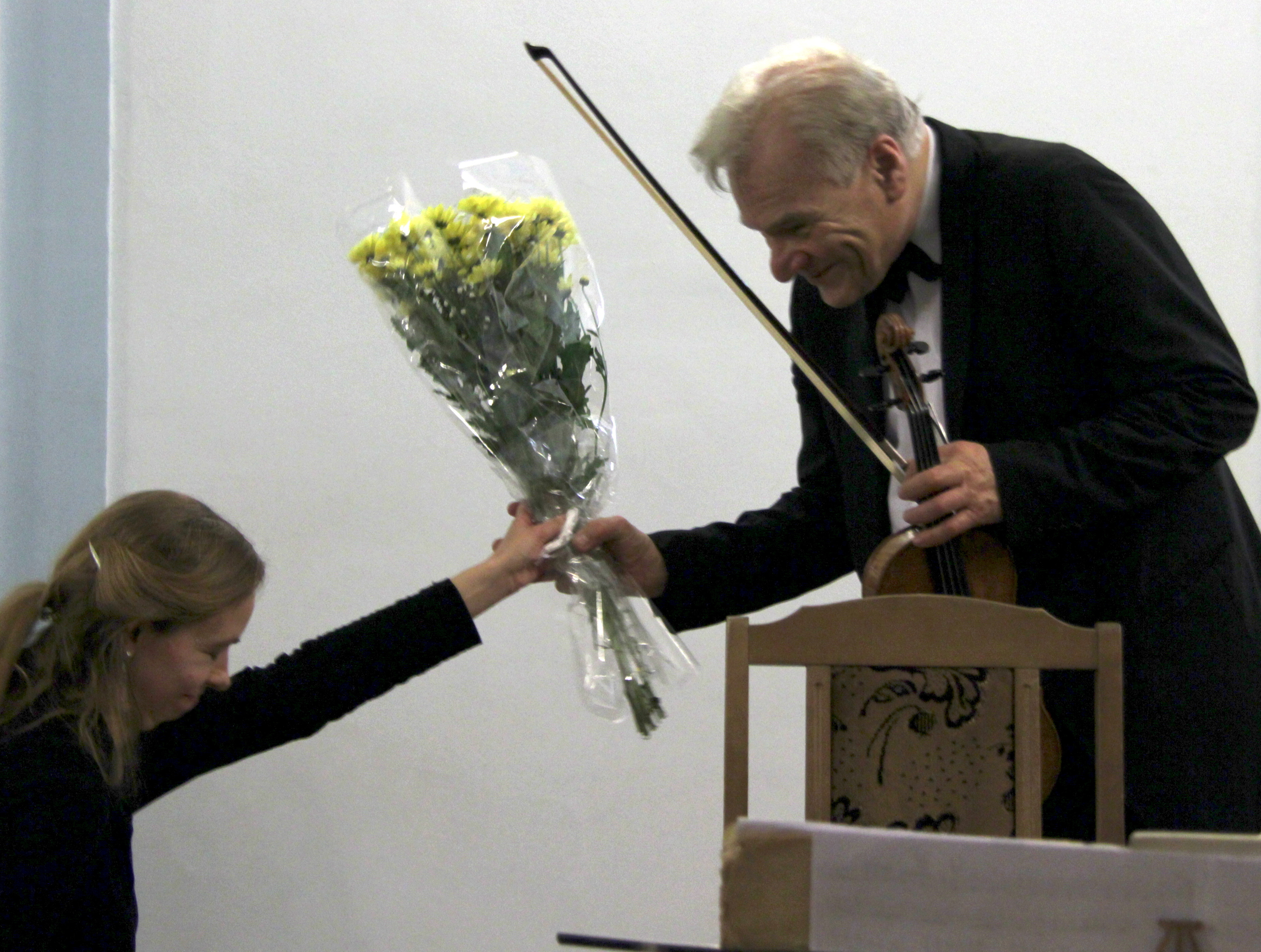
- Leskowitz after a concert in Moscow (2012)
- Born: 7 August 1943 (age 83); Salzburg, Austria
- Occupation: Classical violinist
- Organizations: Salzburg Soloists
- Website: salzburgersolisten.wordpress.com

Luz Leskowitz (born 7 August 1943) is an Austrian violinist, founder of the Salzburg Soloists music ensemble. He is the owner of the ex-Prihoda Stradivarius violin made in 1707.

== Early career ==
Leskowitz was born in Salzburg into a family of musicians. He began playing violin at the age of six. At age thirteen he moved to Vienna to study at the Vienna Academy of Music. His teacher at the academy was a Czech violinist, Váša Příhoda, later followed by an Argentinian-Austrian-American violinist, Ricardo Odnoposoff.

After his study in the Academy he moved back to Salzburg to study in the Mozarteum University. Parallel to his university classes he took lessons in violin and viola from viola soloist Ernst Wallfisch. After graduation he received an invitation from Yehudi Menuhin, one of the greatest violinists of the century, to become a music teacher for his school in London. Collaboration with Yehudi Menuhin deeply influenced the young violinist.

== Music ==
At the age of twenty, Luz Leskowitz made his debut performances in London (Wigmore Hall and Queen Elizabeth Hall), in New York (Carnegie Hall), in Vienna (Golden Hall of the Musikverein), in Milan (Verdi Hall) and in Hamburg (Music Hall of the Hamburg Philharmonic). His performances were received exceptionally well, which lead to more concerts around the world in Europe, USA, Russia, South America, the Middle East, and Far Eastern Asia.

Every year he performs and gives master classes around the world, most often in Austria, Germany, Russia, South Korea, and Japan. Luz Leskowitz performs solo or as a part of a string ensemble. Often he or his ensemble is joined with other musicians forming a chamber ensemble.

In 1979 Luz Leskowitz organised his first ensemble "Salzburg Soloists" (German: Salzburger Solisten) which was followed by two other ensembles called "Salzburg Mozart Players" (German: Salzburger Mozartspieler)" and "Salzburg Soloists Trio" (German: Salzburger Solistentrio). Luz Leskowitz often performs with "Salzburg Soloists" in Europe, Russia, and around the globe.

He and his ensembles collaborated with such musicians and ensembles as Vasily Shcherbakov, Paul Badura-Skoda, Wilhelm Kempff, Ingrid Haebler, Jörg Demus, Jeremy Menuhin, the “Oistrakh-Family”, Norbert Brainin, David Geringas, Heinrich Schiff, Mstislav Rostropovich, Hermann Baumann, Karl Leister, Michala Petri, Sharon Bezaly, Peter Wispelway, Hakan Hardenberger, Elly Ameling, Bartok Quartet, Lark Quartet, Voces Quartet, Kocian Quartet, and the Amati Ensemble.

== ex-Prihoda ==
Luz Leskowitz owns and plays a Stradivarius violin made by Antonio Stradivari in the city of Cremona in 1707. The official ID number for the violin is 3652 and although the violin has not been given an official sobriquet, it is often called ex-Prihoda, by the name of the previous owner, teacher of Luz Leskowitz, Czech violinist Váša Příhoda. Because of the famous nature of such an instrument, it is often mentioned in the concert announcements, especially in Russia and Eastern Europe.

== Festivals ==
Under the impression by Yehudi Menuhin Gstaad Music Festival, Luz Leskowitz in 1970 organised his first chamber music festival in Hamburg, called Harzburger Musiktage. The festival was successful and was followed by more festivals in Austria, Germany, and Romania. Currently he is the head of such festivals as "May Festival in the Rellingen Cathedral" (German: Mai Festival Rellinger Kirche) which first ran in 1986 and the "International Music Ferstival at the Berleburg Castle" (German: Internationale Musikfestwoche at Schloss Berleburg), run since 1972.

Leskowitz is often invited to be on juries of international music competitions. Every year he takes part in organising FLAMES competition in Paris. He also founded the "Yuzhnouralsk—Salzburg" (Russian: Южноуральск—Зальцбург) music competition, one of the rare international music competitions in Russia held outside major cities.

In 1991 Luz Leskowitz took over the "Salzburg Palace Concerts" (German: Salzburger Schlosskonzerte) concert series first organised in 1954, becoming the Artistic Director. Salzburger Schlosskonzerte is based in the Marble Hall of the Salzburg Mirabell Palace. Every year more than 230 concerts are performed under the Salzburger Schlosskonzerte name.

== Discography ==
Luz Leskowitz appeared solo or as part of an ensemble on a number of albums under several music labels, including Cetra Records, Syrinx, Mirabell, Arte Nova Classics, Sony Music, EMI-Classics, BIS Records, Brilliant Classics, Point Classics, One Media, X5 Music Group, BFM Digital, and Ok Records.

- 1996 — Johannes Brahms String Sextets Nos. 1, 2 (Label: Arte Nova Classics)
- 1997 — Chamber Music of Europe (Label: Arte Nova Classics)
- 1997 — Brahms: Piano and Chamber Music (Label: Arte Nova Classics)
- 2002 — Mozart: Flute Quartets (Label: BIS Records)
- 2005 — The Best of Mozart (Label: Point Classics)
- 2005 — #1 Classical -Concertos for flute (Label: X5 Music Group)
- 2006 — Mozart: Gran Partita (Label: Brilliant Classics)
- 2008 — Mozart: Flute & Harp Concerto – Flute Concertos Nos. 1, 2 (Label: Savoy Label Group)
- 2008 — Mozart: Quartets for Flute and String Trio – Divertimento No. 15 (Label: Point Classics, BFM Digital)
- 2008 — Stamitz: Quartet for Oboe – Sonata for Viola & Piano – Symphony for 2 Oboes, 2 Horns & Strings (Label: Point Classics, BFM Digital)
- 2008 — Mozart: Cassation No. 2 – Divertimentos K. 156 & 251 (Label: Point Classics, BFM Digital)
- 2009 — Mozart: The Flute Concertos & Andante In C Major (Label: X5 Music Group)
- 2010 — Mozart: Quintet for Clarinet & Strings K. 581 "Stadler Quintet" (Label: One Media)
- 2010 — Mozart: Divertimento No.15 for 2 Horns & Strings in B Flat Major K. 287 "London Serenade No.2" (Label: One Media)
- 2010 — Mozart: Flute Concerto No.1 & No.2 (Label: One Media)
- 2010 — Mozart: Flute Concerto No.4 in A Major K. 298 (Label: One Media)
- 2011 — Mozart: Symphony No.36 – Flute Quartet – Salzburg Symphony No.1 (Label: Ok Records)

== Films ==
Luz Leskowitz played a minor role in the 2001 French-Austrian film The Piano Teacher, appearing as a violinist.
