= Marie Cantagrill =

- Born: 1979 (age 46–47); France
- Genre: Classical
- Occupation: Violinist
- Instrument: Violin

Marie Cantagrill is a French concert violinist and soloist.

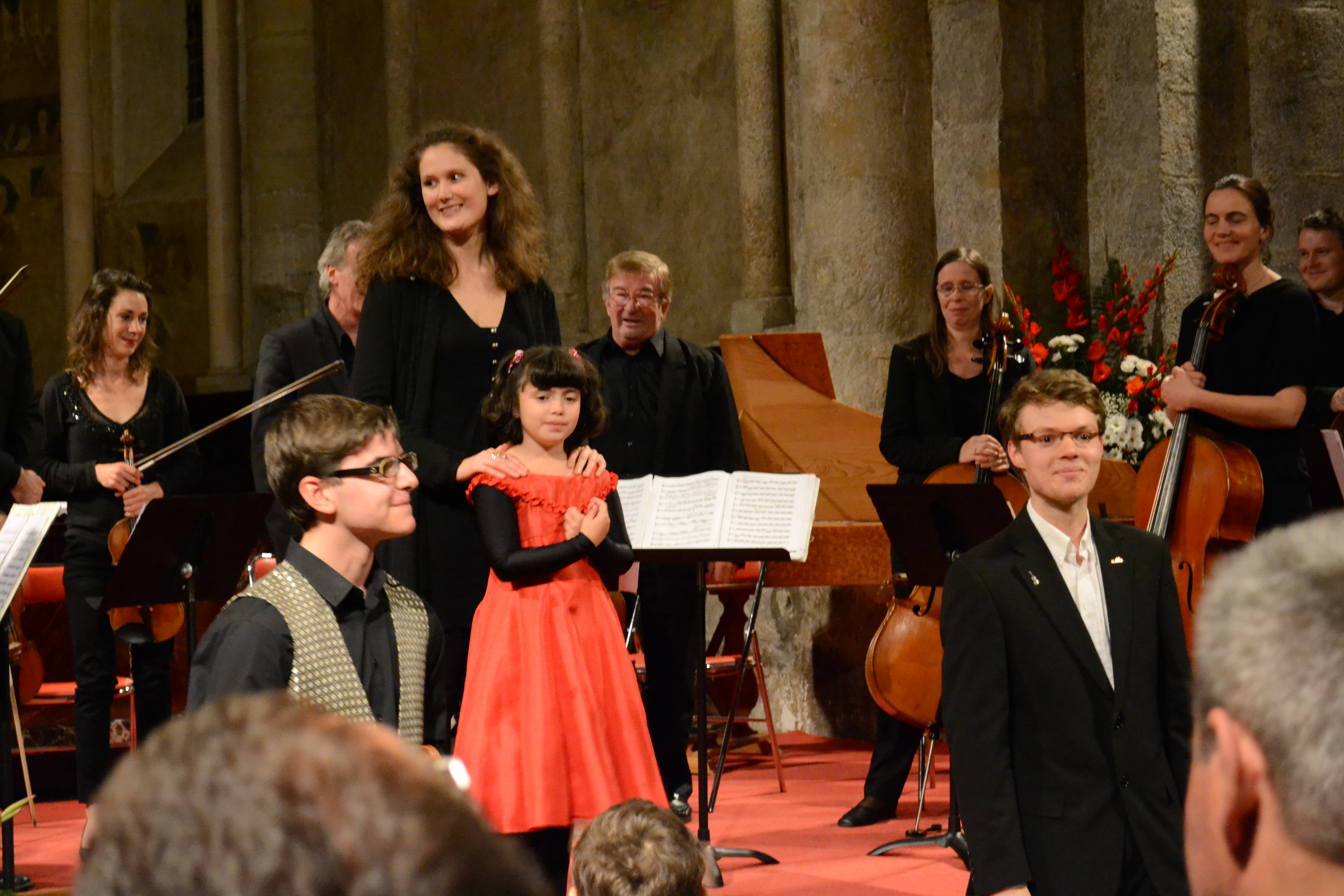
Marie Cantagrill International Violin Competition 2013

== Biography ==
Marie Cantagrill began playing the violin when she was five years old with Helene Grangaud. She notably studied in Philippe Koch’s class at the Royal Superior Conservatory of Liege in Belgium where she obtained the Advanced Diploma for Violin with High Distinction. She also worked with Zoria Chickmoursaeva, a teacher at the Tchaikovsky Conservatory in Moscow, and followed Igor Oistrakh’s advanced class at the Royal Superior Conservatory of Brussels in Belgium. She has won National and International violin competitions (the Pierre Lantier International Competition in Paris, the Claude Langevin Special Prize, the Vieuxtemps Competition in Belgium).

Cantagrill has since then been pursuing her solo career, performing as a soloist with orchestras, in violin and piano Concerts as well as in solo violin Recitals in France and elsewhere.

== Albums ==
After her two first violin and piano albums - which included virtuoso and romantic masterpieces ("Marie Cantagrill - Romantic and virtuoso" and "Récital Slave" (with Véronique Bracco, piano) as well as a Tchaikovsky Violin Concerto and Rimsky-Korsakov Fantasy on Russian Themes Album" - recorded at the Hungarian Radio Studios in Budapest, with the Budapest Concert Orchestra - cond. Tàmàs Gal, Marie Cantagrill is releasing in November 2009 a New Album : "Bach - Partitas n°2 & 3 for solo violin"(Sonatas and partitas for solo violin)

A "SINGLE" with "Bach - Sarabanda in d-minor from the Partita n°2". (1 track CD) has also been released as a preview of the official releasing of her new album.

== Press reviews ==
"These famous Partitas - that are such classical pieces - belong to the most important and difficult masterpieces any violinist can play. And when, as a violinist, as myself, one finds oneself remembering them or re-reading the scores, and when one imagines a faithful, ideal version of those pieces, one wouldn't necessarily have thought the virtuoso Marie Cantagrill - who, before her formidable Tchaikovsky Violin Concerto, had honored Wieniawski, Sarasate, Paganini and other Ravel in her previous albums - would be the one to offer us such a version. Well but...indeed yes, she does! Marie Cantagrill, with her flawless technique, gives to those sublime pages - that are so often performed as dehumanized stylistic exercises by other violinists - true life, and radiating energy.[...] In Bach - even if she perfectly masters, and respects ..."note to note" his scores, with such a precise left hand making you think of the work of a grand clockmaker, - however, never leaving out some very moderate and justified rubatos, - she adorns those pieces - thanks to her subtle bowing, from time to time voluptuous, and caressing, or also rather sharply precise and twirling - with poetic and expressive accents that can only cause emotion and arouse deep resonance in any music lover's soul. An emotion reaching its climax in the sumptuous and appealing Ciaccona. All that with an outstanding and truly artistic sense of good taste regarding this music. This CD, that has been remarkably recorded at the Saint-Serge Church in Angers by "Art et Musique", is a total success." [French Musical Confederation - J.M - 2010]

"Outstanding Marie Cantagrill ! "After a first "Romantic and virtuoso Album", and the very beautiful "Récital Slave", Marie Cantagrill brilliantly pursues her solo career. From concert to concert, in France and elsewhere, she still has taken the time to record a brand new album that fires with enthousiasm an already conquered audience. High standard virtuoso, Marie Cantagrill knows how to make her violin sing and vibrate just as much as she knows how to make our soul thrill. Discover this radiant artist as well as her albums on her website [...]" [Paris Match - "Bach Partitas n°2 & 3" Album - Dec. 2009]

“Marie Cantagrill’s dazzling Partitas. [...]Bach Partitas...require an art of singing, an acute sense of perfect tone and a mastery of the Baroque spirit...All these qualities, Marie Cantagrill undoubtedly has them, – as she has shown us all along her Recital...Marie Cantagrill’s sensitivity particularly unfolded in the subtle and full of nuances Sarabanda, singing, like a Cantata Aria...After a scintillating Giga, came the Ciaconna, from which Marie Cantagrill managed right away, to assert the grandiose nature. Skillfully emphasizing the dialogue between the voices with a singing phrasing, she perfectly managed to express a heroic transport as well as a dreamy poetry...One could fully feel a strong emotion...whilst in the incisive Prelude and final Giga all the dazzling virtuosity of the artist finally broke [L’Alsace]

"The "Angériens", listening religiously, breathed and merged with the virtuoso and her instrument.This Recital was a moment a magic of a rare beauty.[...] From the moment Marie started to play, an intense emotion radiated. The audience offered her an ovation that was fully deserved"[...]" [Sud-Ouest]

“…Apart from having had an exceptional musical course, sensitivity and dexterity, it’s her radiant soul that shines through each one of her interpretations [...] This great artist offers us now moments of exception in the Tchaikovsky“Violin Concerto“ and in the Rimsky-Korsakov“Fantasy on Russian themes“[...] A matchless and tremendous talent, and generosity...“ [Paris Match]

“[...]To confront oneself to a Masterpiece of the Repertoire, like the Tchaikovsky Concerto, that has been recorded by all the greatest violinists of the last 50 years, requires a lot of courage. Well, divine surprise : Marie Cantagrill proves that she has not only a warm and luminous sound „à la Perlman“, but she shows also an original interpretation that is, in no ways, inferior to Vengerov’s for example; in such a ways that she doesn’t seem to come from the“French School“ but rather from the“Russian“ one[..]" [Polytechnique Magazine]

"Marie Cantagrill is an inspirational violinist who plays with no-holds-barred intensity that galvanises the listener's attention.When the notes start flying as in Wieniawski's whistle-stop Scherzo Tarantella or Rimsky's Flight of the Bumblebee, she provides a real "heads-down-and-see-you-at-the-end" experience that captures the music's uncontainable exuberance to perfection. And whenever she has the chance to dig deep and produce a voluptuous tone, as in Tchaïkowski's heart-rending op.42 Meditation, the effect is all-engulfing as with Itzkhak Perlman (EMI) and Isaac Stern (CBS, now Sony). Cantagrill memorably captures the swaggering bravado of Brahms's Hungarian Dances nos. 1 & 5; and rarely has the soulful plaintiveness of Rachmaninoff's ravishing Vocalise been so powerfully conveyed as here... " ["The Strad Magazine" - U.K]
