= International Shostakovich Chamber Music Competition =

Classical music contest

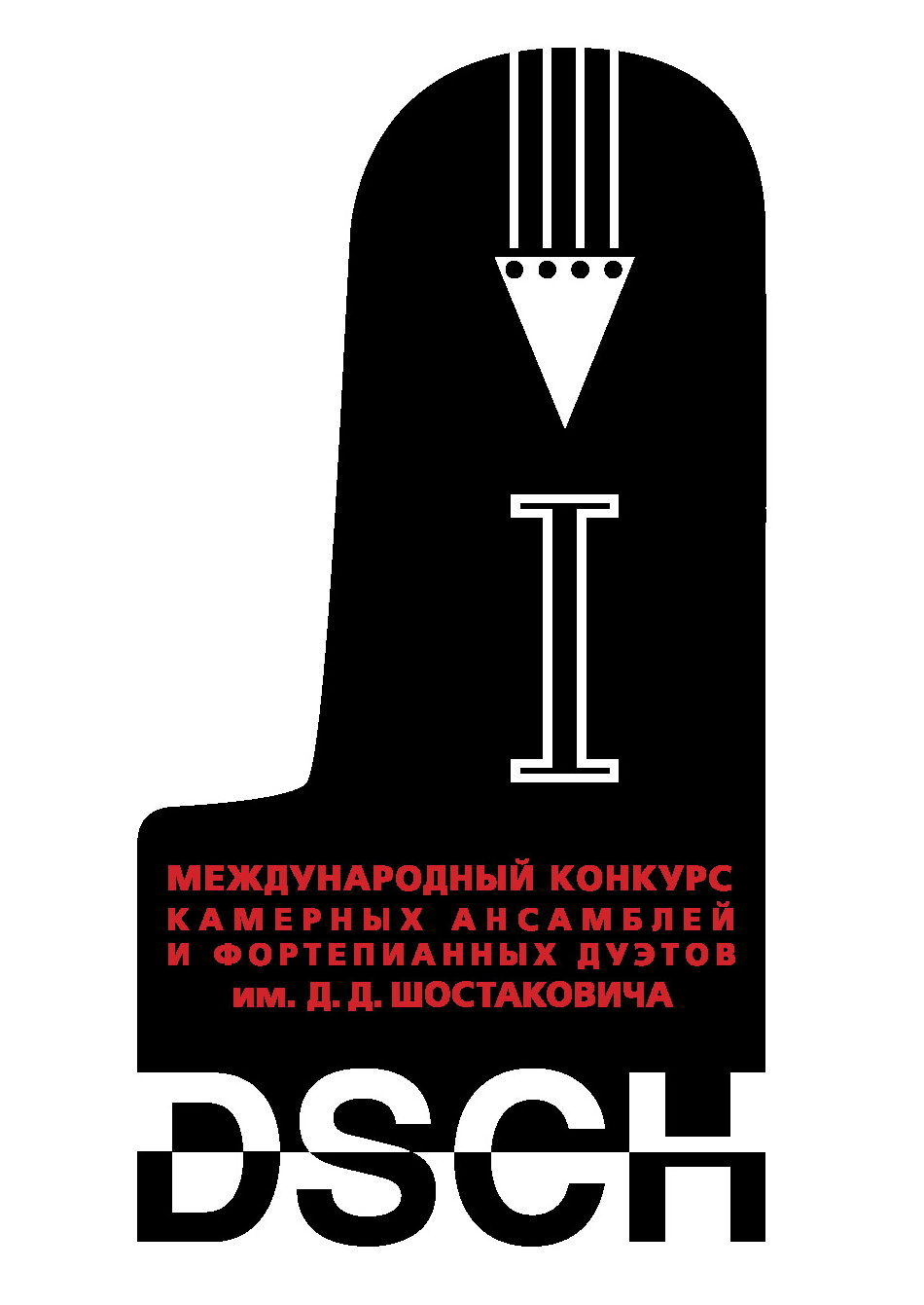
The emblem of the Shostakovich Chamber Music Competition

The Shostakovich competition is a classical music contest in chamber music performance. The two editions of the competition were held in 2008 and 2010 in Moscow, Russia. The contest was open to the participants of all countries in two categories: chamber music ensembles and piano duets. The Shostakovich Chamber Music Competition continued the line of musical contests named after Shostakovich and dedicated to the chamber music: e.g. Shostakovich String Quartet Competition in Moscow.

According to the competition chairman V. I. Vorona:

"The influential Shostakovich competition in chamber music has gained a lot of interest from the musical community from the start. I'm positive that it has a great prospective to contribute in the development of the chamber music performance and that it will give opportunities for young musicians to express themselves."

== 1st Edition of 2008 ==
=== Regulations and statistics ===
The First Shostakovich Competition was held in Moscow from February 25 to March 2, 2008. It was open for contestants around the world. The Chamber Music Ensembles category included participants in the following age groups:

- Group 1 (12–20 years old)
- Group 2 (21–35 years old)

The Piano Duet category was open for the ages from 11 to 27 years old.

The competitive performances took place at the Grand Hall of the State Music and Pedagogical Institute named after M. M. Ippolitov-Ivanov, in the Rachmaninoff Hall of the Tchaikovsky Moscow State Conservatory and in the hall of the Glinka State Central Museum of Musical Cultures. The concert of the laureates and the closing ceremony were held in the Rachmaninoff Hall of Moscow Conservatory on March 2, 2008.

The competition has gathered 75 ensembles from Russia, Armenia, Belarus, Latvia, and Ukraine. The chamber music festival DSCH was organized at the same time with the competition. The featured artists included State Shostakovich String Quartet, and Ippolitov-Ivanov Piano Quartet.

According to the jury member professor Elena Sorokina: "It was not easy to select the best ensembles, for the level of competitors was very high".

=== Founding organizations ===
- Ministry of Culture of Russia
- Government of Moscow
- The Department of Culture of the city of Moscow
- Federal Agency of culture and cinematography
- Russian Performing Art foundation
- Russian Association of Musical Competitions
- State Musical Pedagogical Institute named after M. M. Ippolitov-Ivanov
- Russian association "Russian Union for the World Culture"

Chair of the organization committee - professor Valery Vorona.

=== Jury ===
- Tigran Alikhanow, chair - People's Artist of Russia, rector and professor of piano at the Moscow State Conservatory
- Elena Sorokina, co-chair in the piano duet category - Honored Artist of Russia, vice-chancellor and professor of piano at the Moscow State Conservatory
- Alexander Korchagin, co-chair in the Chamber Music Group 1 category - People's Artist of Russia, professor of cello at the Moscow State Conservatory
- Galina Shirinskaya, co-chair in the Chamber Music Group 2 category - Honored Artist of Russia, professor of piano at the Moscow State Conservatory
- Valery Vorona, violin - Honored Art Worker of Russia, professor, rector of the Ippolitov-Ivanov Pedagogical Institute, president of the Russian Performing Art foundation
- Lyudmila Zimovina, cello - associate professor of the Ippolitov-Ivanov Pedagogical Institute
- Gunta Rasa ex Sproge, piano - chamber music department chair of the Jāzeps Vītols Latvian Academy of Music
- Alexander Trostiansky, violin - Honoured Artist of Russia, winner of the International Tchaikovsky competition, associate professor of the Tchaikovsky Moscow State Conservatory
- Sergei Uryvayev, piano - Honoured Artist of Russia, professor of the Saint Petersburg Rimsky-Korsakov Conservatory
- Hans-Peter Stenzl, piano - professor of Rostock Hochschule für Musik und Theater and the Royal Academy of Music in London
- Vasily Scherbakov, piano - the director of the competition, winner of the International competition, associate professor of the Ippolitov-Ivanov Pedagogical Institute
- Alexander Buzlov, cello - winner of the International Tchaikovsky competition
- Ilia Gofman, viola - winner of the International competitions
- Ruben Muradyan, piano - winner of the International competitions
- Maxim Puryzhinskiy, piano - winner of the International competitions

=== Results ===
==== Chamber ensembles ====
===== Group 1 =====
I Prize - duet Liya Yakupova (violin), and Anna Tamarkina (piano)

II Prize - duet Anna Aseeva (violin) and Lidiya Nochovskaya (piano)

III Prize - trio Juventa: Alexey Osipov (violin), Nikita Kinyaev, (cello), and Sergei Redkin (piano); quintet Viktoria Ashmarina (violin), Yana Ashmarina (violin), Maria Yarisheva (viola), Maria Efanova (cello), and Olga Chmil (piano).

===== Group 2 =====
I Prize - Class&Jazz Duo: Oleg Bezuglov (violin), and Natalia Bezuglova (piano)

II Prize - duet Ineta Abakuka (viola), and Inara Piksha (piano)

III Prize - duet Alexander Haskin (flute), and Artem Selivanov (piano); duet Alexey Cherkasov (violin), and Alexey Muratov (piano)

Special Prizes:

For the best performance of the piece written after 1970: trio M. Boltavskaya (violin), P. Churilov (cello), and D. Shaposhnikova (piano)

For the best performance of Shostakovich's piece: duet O. Bezuglov (violin), and N. Bezuglova (piano). For the best performance of the romantic piece: duet I. Tarasenko (viola), and T. Shevchenko (piano).

==== Piano duets ====
I Prize - Olga Trofimova, and Ilia Hrustov

II Prize - Tatiana Shatkovskaya, and Anna Shatkovskaya; Anastasia Gramoglasova, and Lubov Gramoglasova; Maria Spirina and Irina Zarechneva

III Prize - Anastasia Rybina and Elena Severukhina; Artem Lyahovich and Alina Romanova

Special Prizes:

For the Best Performance of Shostakovich's piece: O. Trofimova - I. Hrustov; T. and A. Shatkovskaya; A. and L. Gromoglasoval; A. Lyahovich - A. Romanova For the Best Performance of the Fantasia on the themes from Mussorgsky's Opera "Boris Godunov": D. Pinchuk - A. Savinov.

== 2nd Edition of 2010 ==
=== Regulations ===
In its 2nd edition the competition was held in one category, which included chamber music ensembles with the piano. Participants were judged in two age groups:

- Junior Group - 14–20 years old
- Senior Group - 21–30 years old

In the Junior Group eligible ensembles included piano duets, and piano trios. In the Senior Group the participants competed in duets, piano trios and piano quintets.

The competitive performances took place at the Grand Hall of the Ippolitov-Ivanov Pedagogical Institute on October 4–10, 2010. The competition was held in two rounds.

=== Founding organizations ===
- Ministry of Culture of Russia
- Russian Performing Art foundation
- Moscow Union of Composers
- Russian Association of Musical Competitions
- State Musical Pedagogical Institute named after M. M. Ippolitov-Ivanov
- The Chamber Music Department of Ippolitov-Ivanov Pedagogical Institute

=== Jury ===
- Galina Shirinskaya, chair - Honored Artist of Russia, professor of the Moscow State Conservatory
- Mats Widlund, piano - professor of the Royal College of Music in Stockholm
- Tatiana Afanasieff, violin - professor of the Niedermeyer conservatory in Paris
- Valery Vorona, violin - Honored Art Worker of Russia, professor, rector of the Ippolitov-Ivanov Pedagogical Institute, president of the Russian Performing Art foundation
- Tigran Alikhanow, piano - People's Artist of Russia, rector and professor of the Moscow State Conservatory
- Elena Simishina, piano - Chamber Music Department chair and professor at the Saint Petersburg Rimsky-Korsakov Conservatory
- Elena Sorokina, piano - Honored Artist of Russia, vice-chancellor and professor of piano at the Moscow State Conservatory
- Vasily Scherbakov, piano - the director of the competition, winner of the International competition, associate professor of the Ippolitov-Ivanov Pedagogical Institute
- Lyudmila Zimovina, cello - associate professor of the Ippolitov-Ivanov Pedagogical Institute.

=== Results ===
I Prize - trio Yaroslav Zaboyarkin (violin), Dmitri Yanov-Yanovsky (cello), Igor Andreev (piano); duet Maria Lazareva (violin) and Andrey Gugnin (piano)

II Prize - duet Mitinskiy Aleksandr (viola) and Nadezhda Kotnova (piano)

III Prize - quintet Svetlana Bezotosnaya (violin), Elena Savelyeva (violin), Elena Pentegova (viola), Lidiya Braun (cello), and Olga Lavrova (piano); trio Sozonova Elizaveta (violin), Pavel Glazyrin (cello), Valentina Nemkova (piano)

Special prizes:

For the Best Performance of Shostakovich's piece: duet Mitinskiy Aleksandr (viola) and Nadezhda Kotnova (piano)
