= Vorona (disambiguation) =

Vorona is a monotypic genus of prehistoric birds.

Vorona may also refer to:

- Vorona (album), a 1996 album by Russian singer Linda
- Vorona (TV series) a 2018 Russian detective series
- Vorona (Khopyor), a tributary of the river Khopyor in southern Russia
- Vorona (Siret), a tributary of the river Siret in Botoșani County, Romania
- Vorona, a tributary of the river Bystrytsia in Ivano-Frankivsk Oblast, Ukraine
- Vorona (surname)
- Vorona, Botoșani, a commune in Botoșani County, Romania

== See also ==
- Voronya (disambiguation)
- Corona (disambiguation)
