= Fine Line (film) =

2023 documentary film

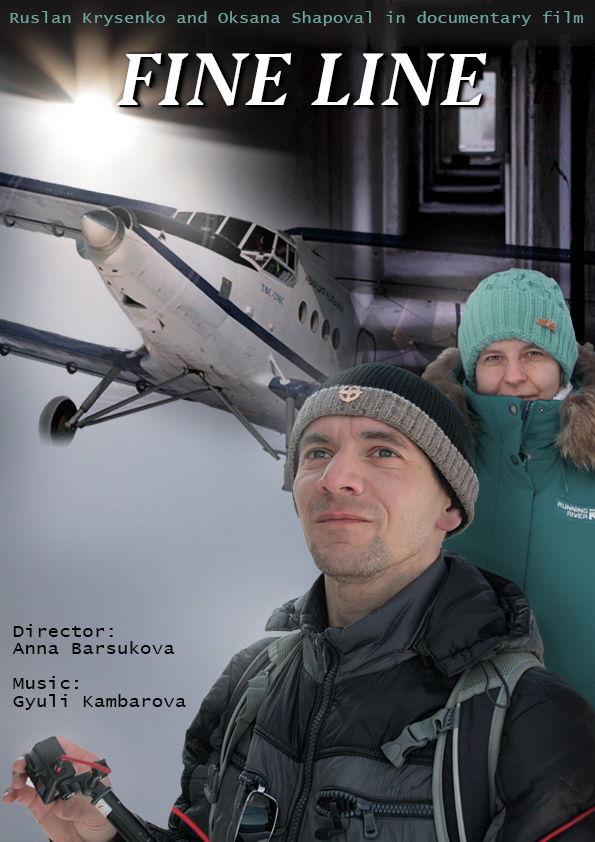
- Film poster
- Russian: Между отчаянием и надеждой
- Directed by: Anna Barsukova
- Produced by: Anna Barsukova
- Starring: Ruslan Krysenko, Oksana Shapoval
- Music by: Gyuli Kambarova
- Release date: 4 March 2023
- Running time: 49 minutes
- Country: Russia
- Language: Russian

Fine Line (Russian: Между отчаянием и надеждой) is a 2023 documentary film directed by Anna Barsukova.

== Plot ==
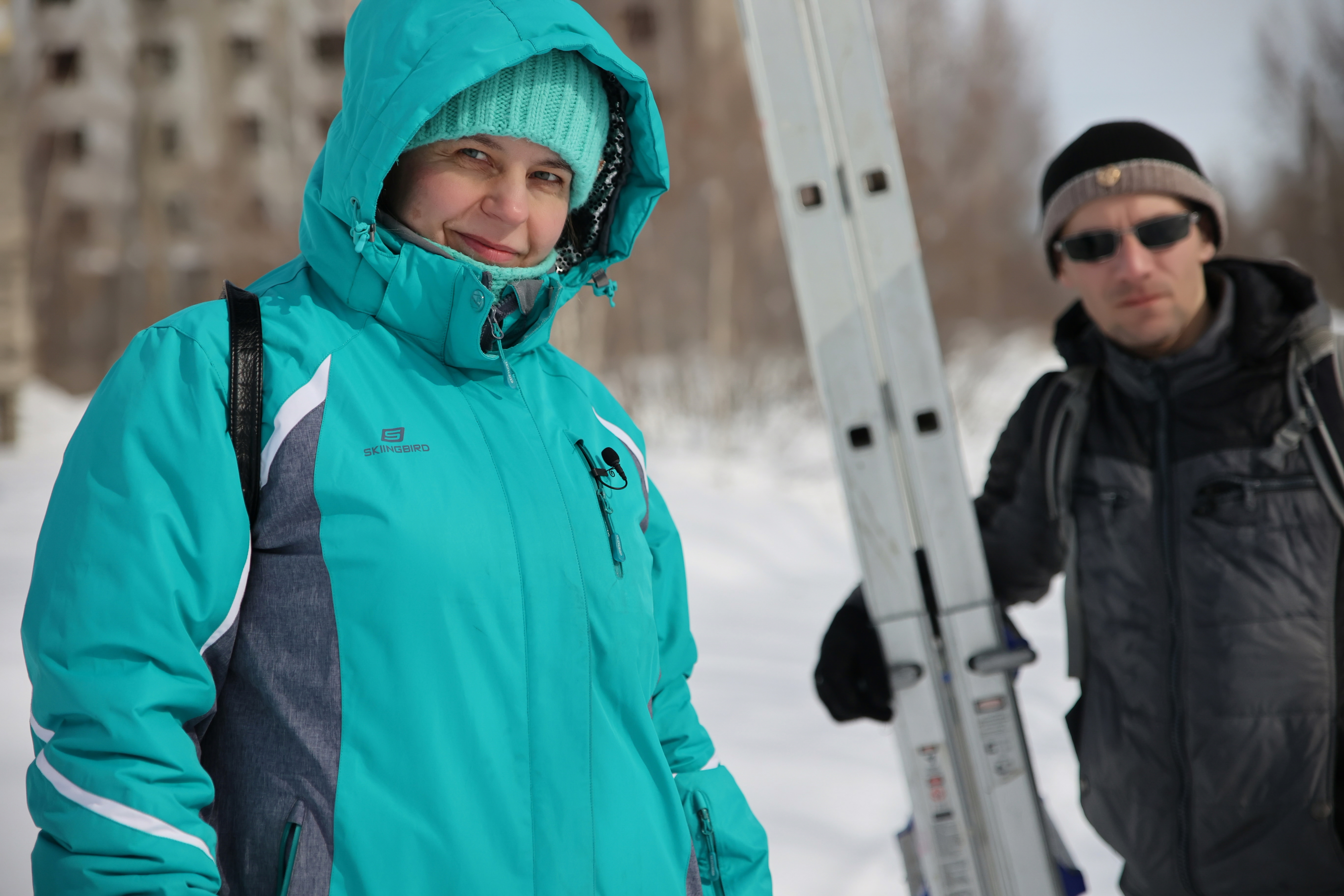
The main characters of the film Fine Line

The film has two main characters, two destinies, two storylines that run parallel but are closely intertwined.

Oksana is a social worker at the local nursing home and has moved to Sinegorye, Magadan – a half-abandoned, sparsely populated settlement on the banks of the Kolyma River amid blue mountains – from a big city, driven by her desire to contribute to the local community. Oksana's social skills immediately make her a valuable team member and a friend to the inhabitants of what seems a comfortable oasis amidst the permafrost. Oksana and the team of caregivers provide care and assistance to those who need them every day. Among the nursing home residents is Ruslan's mother, who Oksana takes care of until her last day. Oksana is the one who is compassionate and empathetic. Her feelings and emotional state are shown in an attempt to humanize our attitude to problems of old age and disability, to help people connect, empathize and find strength to help those in need, for old age (and age-related diseases) spares no part of the world and no stratum of society. Oksana's neighbour Ruslan is a native of Sinegorye and has witnessed the drama of the ’90s which had put an end to Sinegorye as a thriving Russian town (there were many small towns in the Russian Far East that went into decline). A true patriot of his home town, Ruslan speaks with undisguised regret about what once was a prosperous place filled with laughter of happy children. It is with conflicting feelings that Ruslan narrates about Sinegorye. It may seem he has resigned himself to the depressing reality with little prospect for improvement, but this perception changes towards the end of the film. You need to watch to find out why. Ruslan's fate is an example that even in the most desperate of situations people should never abandon hope.

== Problems ==
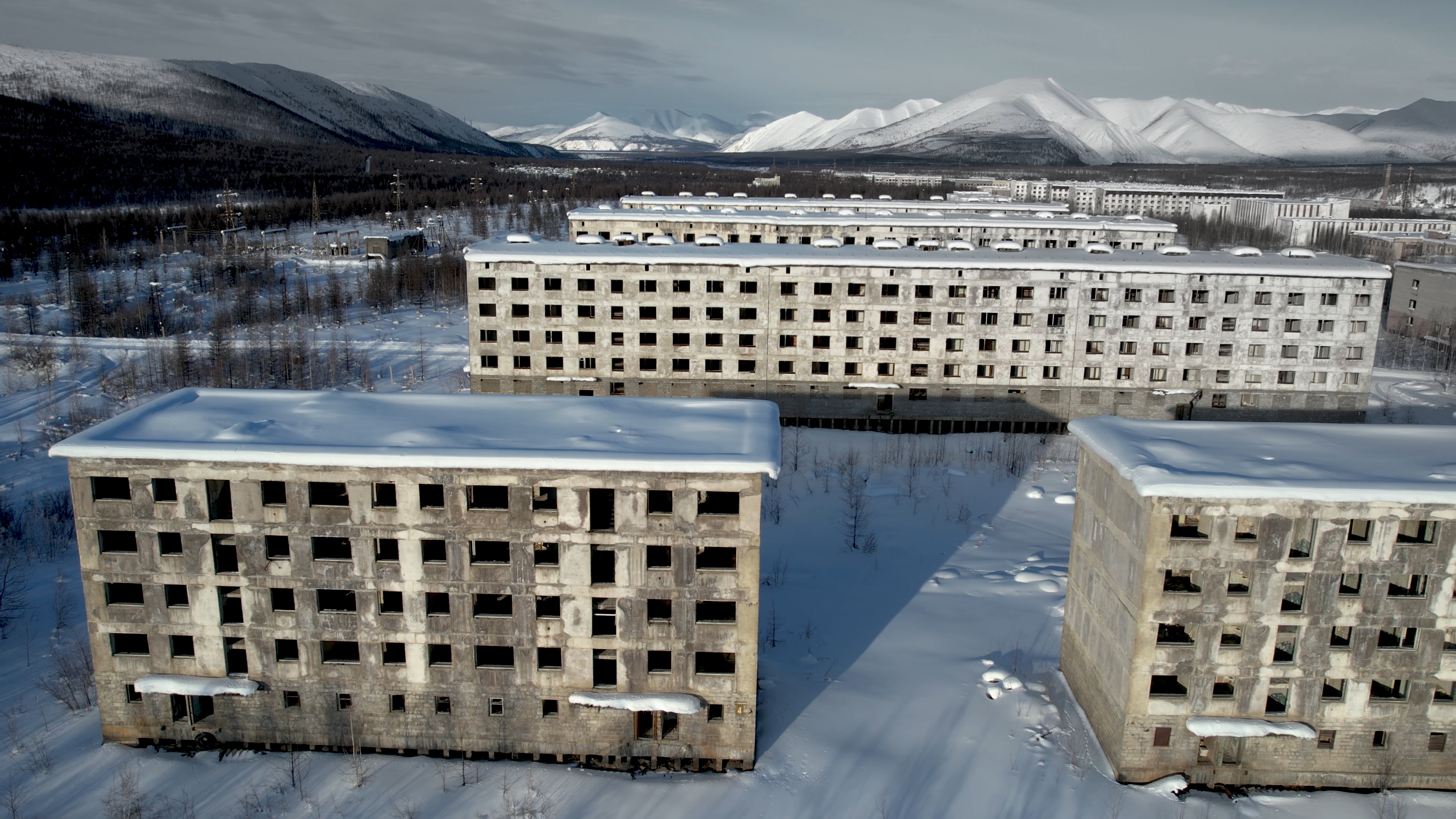
Still from the film Fine Line 2023

One of Russia's most promising provinces, the Far East appears in the country leaders’ strategy as "eastern vector". Promoting its development is not without challenges, though, the biggest one being demography: the area's northernmost city, Magadan, is experiencing a rapid population decline.

Remoteness from road infrastructure and low quality of life forces many northerners to leave their long established residence for better places. As a result, the areas in the Russian Far East now have fewer prospects for development. Population decline can be stopped by improving people's living conditions. By showing things as they are, we allow viewers to make their own judgements and conclusions, hoping that one day positive changes will start happening in the Russian hinterland.

An Air route network expansion is a prerequisite for quality life in the Russian Far East. In Magadan Province, air carriages were once as accessible as road transport. Settlements used to operate several flights to Magadan per day. But, what happened in the country in the ’90s could not but affect the air traffic: the number of domestic flights was reduced to a minimum, as was the number of the rural airports. Small aircraft represent the only mode of transport for 80% of the Far Eastern territories and for 90% of Magadan Province. In January 2022, for the first time in more than 20 years, Sinegorye resume the (weekly) flights to Magadan using TVS-2MS turboprops.
