= Oleg Bezuglov =

Oleg Bezuglov Oleg Vyacheslavovich Bezuglov
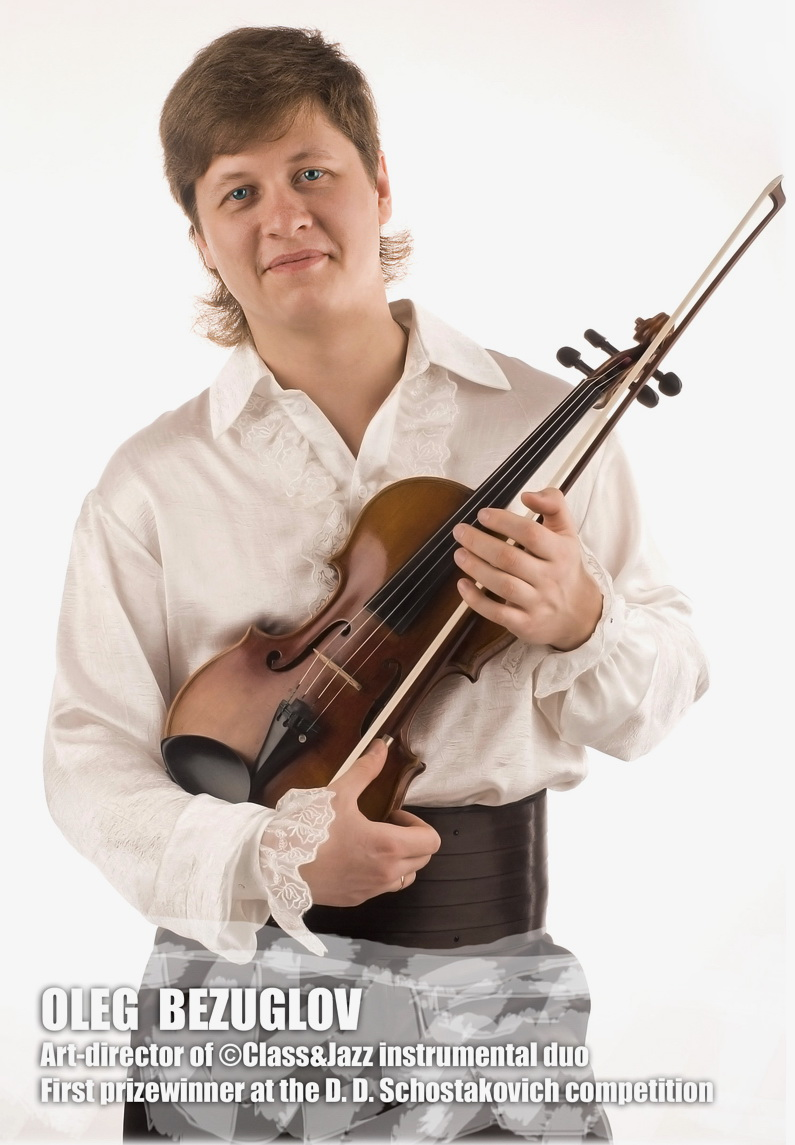

Background information
- Born: May 20, 1984 (age 42); Russia
- Genres: jazz, classical
- Occupation: Musician
- Instrument: Violin
- Years active: 2005–present
- Website: www.olegbezuglov.com

Oleg Vyacheslavovich Bezuglov (Russian: Олег Вячеславович Безуглов; 20 May 1984, Rostov-on-Don, Russia) – is a Russian violinist, chamber musician and teacher, co-founder of the violin and piano duo Class&Jazz. The Honored Worker of the Russian Musical Society since 2010.

== Education ==
Bezuglov graduated from the Rostov State Rachmaninoff Conservatory (M.M. in violin performance, 2006; D.M.A. in chamber music, 2009), and Michigan State University College of Music (D.M.A. in violin performance, 2017). He has studied violin and chamber music performance with Dmitri Berlinsky, Dmitri Sheinkman, and Margarita Chernykh and composition with Vitaly Hodosh.

== Class&Jazz Duo ==
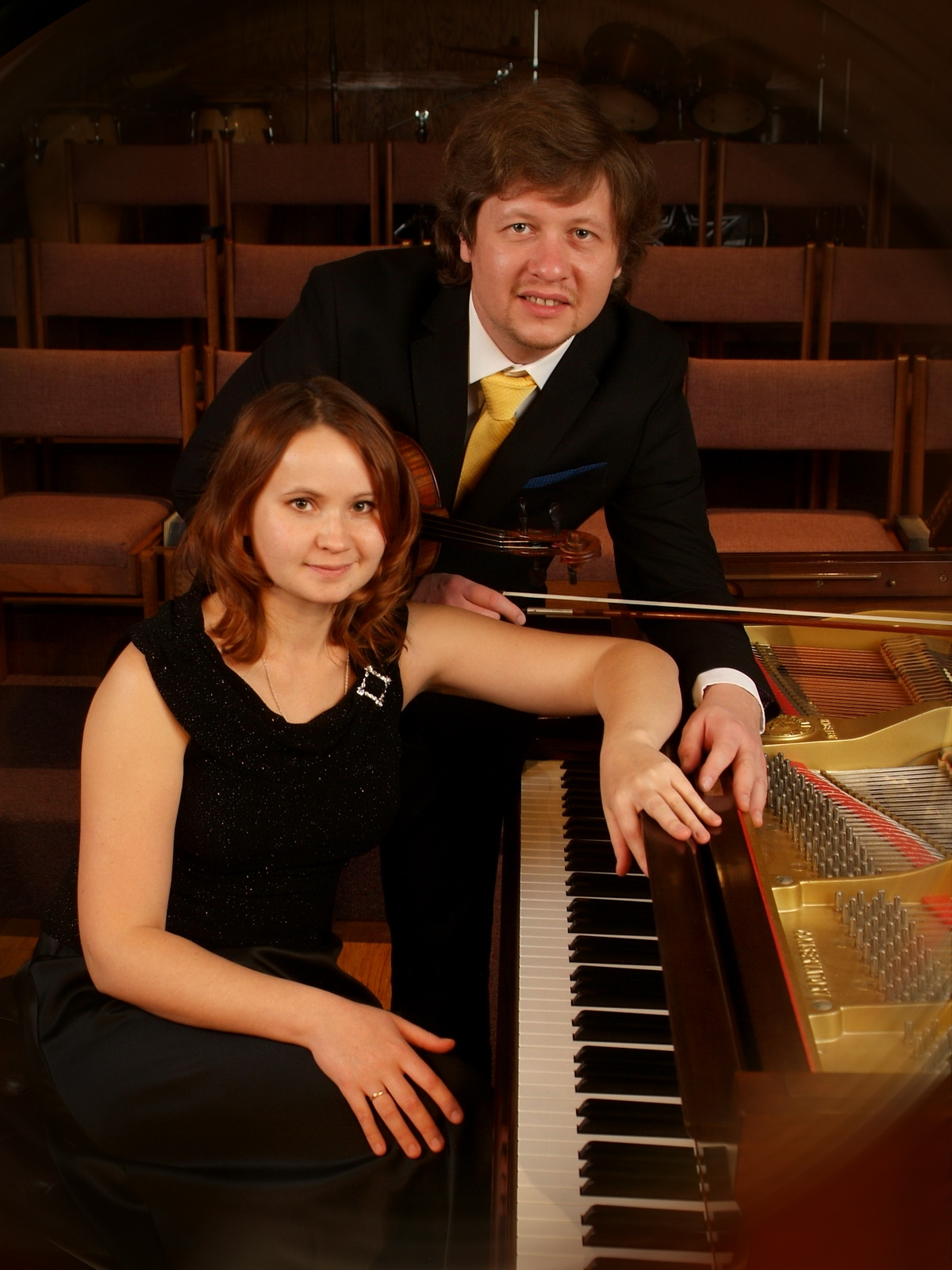
Class&Jazz Duo - Oleg Bezuglov, violin and Natalia Bezuglova, piano

In 2005 together with the pianist Natalia Bezuglova he formed the Instrumental Duo Class&Jazz. The ensemble repertoire combines classical music pieces with jazz masterpieces. The group became a winner of several International Competitions in classical music including the First Prize at the 1st Dmitri Shostakovitch International Competition of Chamber Ensembles and Piano Duos (Moscow, Russia 2008); and the Third Prize and Bronze Medal at the 7th International Chamber Music Ensemble Competition in New England (Boston, MA 2016). Class&Jazz has performed at manymusic festivals worldwide, including 16th International Brahms Festival in Pörtschach am Wörthersee (Austria, 2009), 3rd Festival of Contemporary Music "Rostov Premieres" (Russia, 2006), Moscow musical festival of forum "Klassika" (Russia, 2009), and 4th International Festival "Odesa Dialogues" (Ukraine, 2009). In 2009 the duo started the chamber music festival "Christmas Premieres" in their native city of Rostov-on-Don, Russia. They were the authors and performers of the original concert project Music and War, which premiered in Russia in 2009. Class&Jazz Duo produced two CD-albums. Their recording of Shostakovich and Beethoven violin and piano sonatas, published in September 2013, was critically acclaimed by Phoenix Classical for “excellent performance – very expressive and emotive – precise intonation and technique – great balance with the piano – deeply poetic playing”.

== AnarchY string quartet ==
In 2006 Oleg Bezuglov was invited to join the string quartet AnarchY, that was founded and directed by Azerbaijani violinist Anar Yusifov. This group was one of the main contributors to the show-project "Golden Violin", which premiered in the Rostov State Musical Theater (Rostov-on-Don, Russia) in September, 2007. The AnarchY quartet specialized in mixing classical compositions with rock and pop music styles.

== Festivals and competitions ==
Oleg Bezuglov was the guest performer at the 5th International Festival «The Musical Personalities» named after Alexandre Tansman (Poland, 2004), 6th International Festival “Bachakademie” (Germany-Austria-Switzerland, 2006), 12th Annual Cello Plus Chamber Music Festival (USA, 2012), 2nd and 4th International Festivals of Contemporary Music "Rostov Premieres" (Russia, 2003, 2010), and the Tuesday Matinees series of the Merkin Concert Hall (USA, 2015). He is the Third Prize winner of the 8th International Maria Yudina Competition in Chamber Music (Russia, St. Petersburg 2004), the MSU Honors Concerto Competition (USA, East Lansing, MI 2013), and the highly-commended award of The World Competition (Australia, VIC 2013). He was a featured violinist in the first performance and recording of two Piano Trios composed by the Russian composer Gyuli Kambarova and released on the My Way CD-record in 2016.

== Honors and awards ==
In 2008 Oleg Bezuglov became a laureate of the national award program "Golden Talent" administered by the Russian Performing Art foundation. In 2010 he was instated as the member and the Honored Worker of the Russian Musical Society. Throughout his career, Oleg received grants from several foundations, including Alexander Glazunov foundation in Munich, Germany (2009), Johannes Brahms Society in Pörtschach, Austria (2009), Spenser & Eleanor Maurer Foundation (2010), and Johnson Coleman Foundation in USA (2012).

== Life in the United States ==
Since 2010 Bezuglov is living in US, where he has been studying with professor Dmitri Berlinsky at MSU College of Music. Since 2012, he was professor Berlinsky's teaching assistant. Bezuglov was the principal violinist with the International Chamber Soloists strings orchestra, and the Concertmaster of the Ad Libitum chamber orchestra. He is also the member of the ION Piano Trio, Michigan State String Quartet, and OctoOpus+ String Nonet.

During his teaching career he has served on faculties of Rostov State Rachmaninoff Conservatory, Flint Institute of Music, Blue Lake fine arts camp, and Michigan State University College of Music.

Bezuglov is also a tenured member of six professional symphony orchestras in the United States: Associate Concertmaster of the Battle Creek Symphony Orchestra; Assistant Principal Second of the Midland Symphony Orchestra, First Violin of Kalamazoo Symphony, West Michigan Symphony, Flint Symphony, and Traverse Symphony orchestras.
