= Voice for the Voiceless =

2019 documentary film

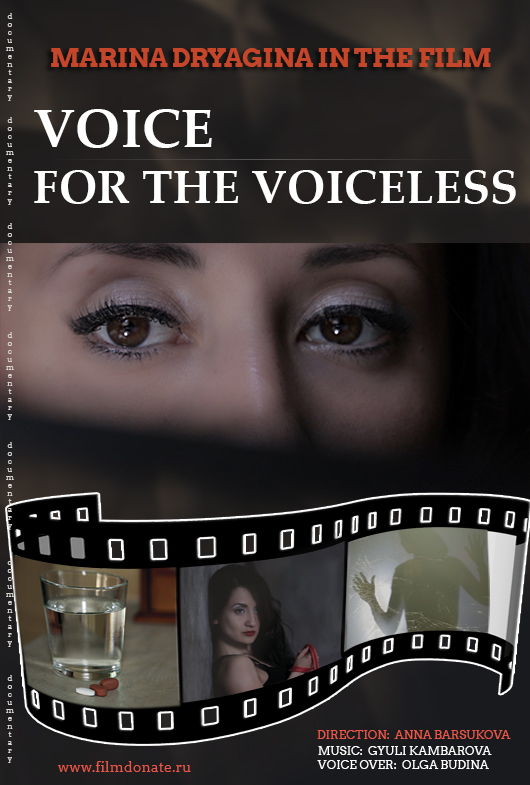
- Film poster
- Russian: Голос за безгласных
- Directed by: Anna Barsukova
- Produced by: Anna Barsukova
- Starring: Marina Dryagina; Olga Budina (voice-over)
- Cinematography: Anna Barsukova; Ruslan Sharafutdinov (aerial survey)
- Edited by: Anna Barsukova
- Music by: Gyuli Kambarova
- Release date: March 31, 2019
- Running time: 33 minutes
- Country: Russia
- Languages: Russian; English

Voice for the Voiceless (Russian: Голос за безгласных) is a 2019 documentary film directed by Anna Barsukova. The film follows a young girl named Marina, a native of Ekaterinburg. She's an insightful, intelligent and beautiful person, a creative thinker and spiritual type with her own perception of things. Marina works a permanent job and has a 5-year-old daughter. Living with HIV does not prevent Marina from achieving success in life. She is a real-life example of building belief in yourself. By showing her emotional state, the film wants to break the stigma and change the public perception of HIV patients.

The film premiered on March 30, 2019 in Yekaterinburg, and later showed at the 2019 Whistleblower Summit Film Festival in Washington, D.C. and aired on Australian television. Widely covered in Russian and foreign media, received many awards at international film festivals.

== Plot ==
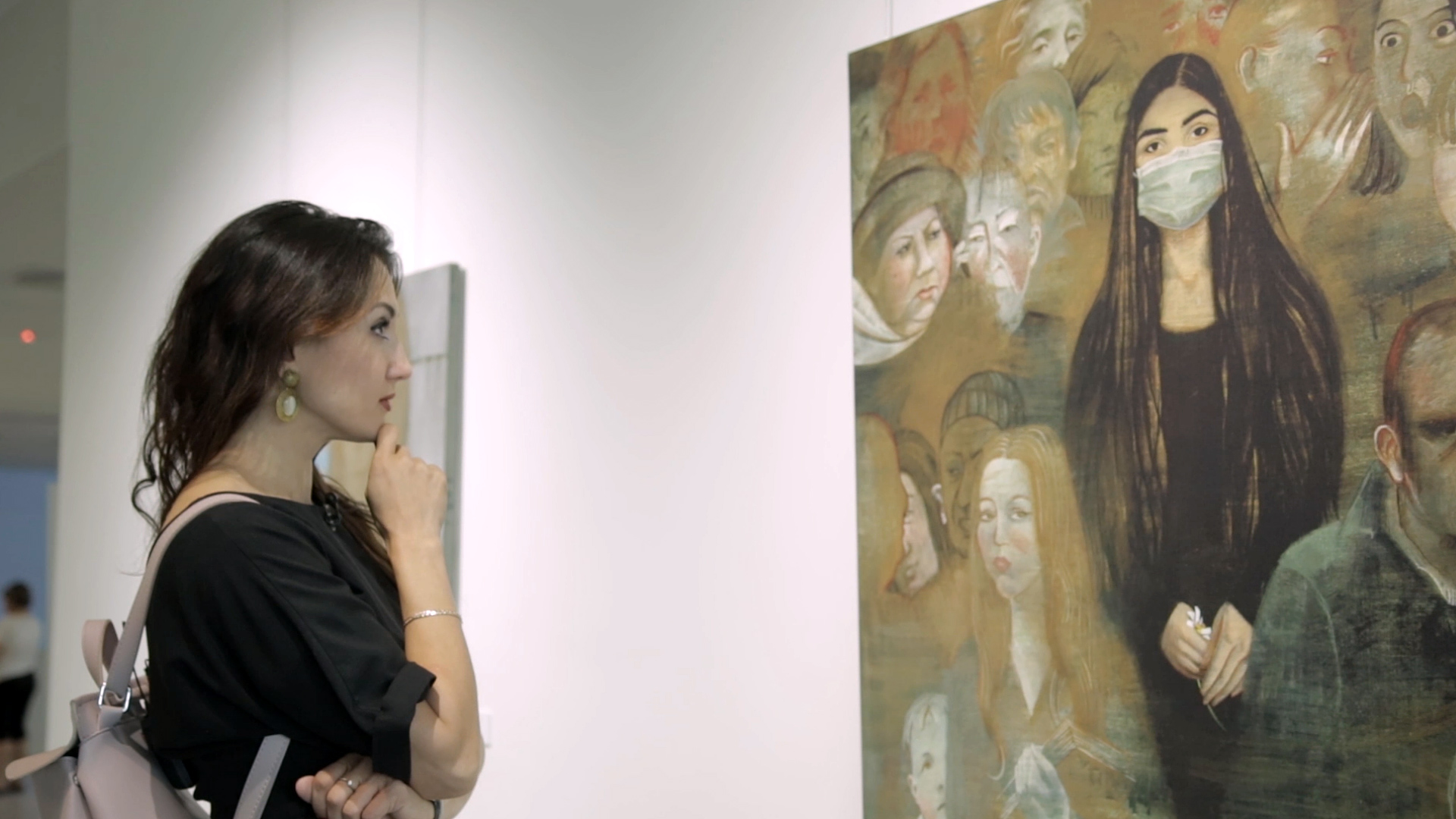
Stills - Voice for the Voiceless

The film follows Marina, an insightful person and creative thinker with her own perception of things. After learning about her diagnosis, she begins to search for answers to her questions. Feeling confused as her story unfolds and fearing disclosure and condemnation, she chooses to trust her thoughts to her diary. But nothing stays hidden for long…
