= Vorona (surname) =

Vorona (Russian: Ворона, Ukrainian: Ворона) or Varona (Belarusian: Варона) is a surname of East Slavic origin, meaning "crow". It may refer to:

- Dmytro Vorona (born 1980), Ukrainian politician
- Ekaterina Vorona (born 1975), Russian artist
- Larysa Varona (born 1983), Belarusian cross-country skier
- Lyubov Vorona, (1931–2021), Ukrainian farm worker and politician
- Mariya Vorona (born 1983), Belarusian rower
- Nikita Vorona (born 1995), Russian footballer
- Valery Vorona, Russian violinist
- Yana Vorona (born 2004), Russian gymnast
- Yelena Vorona (born 1976), Russian freestyle skier

== See also ==
- Wrona
