= Voronya (disambiguation) =

Voronya is a river in the Kola Peninsula in Murmansk Oblast, Russia.

Voronya (Russian: Воронья) may also refer to:

- Voronya Cave, an alternative name for the Krubera Cave in Abkhazia, Georgia, Western Caucasus
- Voronya hill, Duderhof Heights, St. Petersburg, Russia

== See also ==
- Vorona (disambiguation)
