= Vasily Shcherbakov =

Russian pianist, professor and composer (born 1969)

Vasily Shcherbakov Василий Фёдорович Щербаков
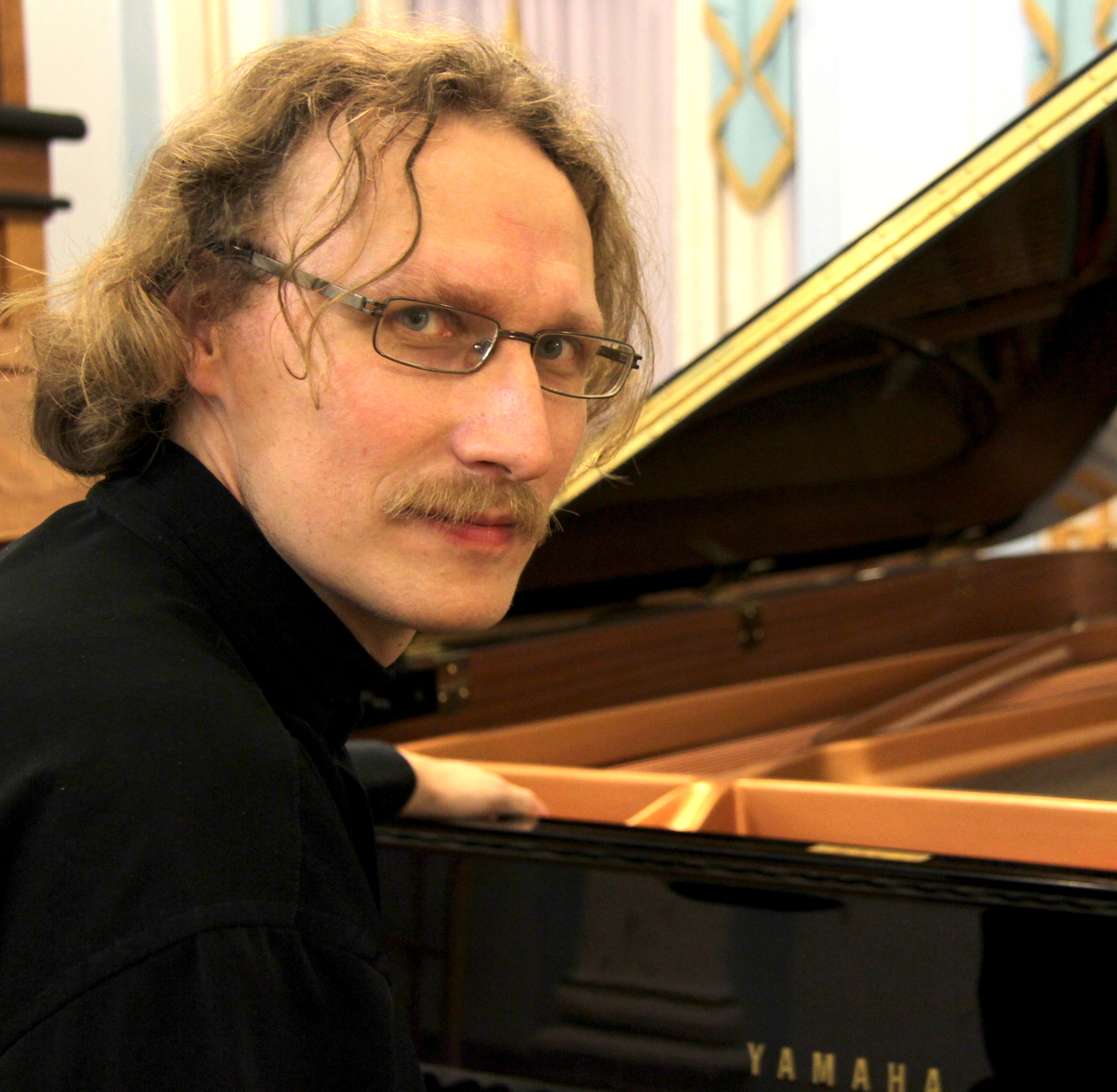
- Vasily Shcherbakov after a concert in Moscow (2012)

Background information
- Born: Vasily Fyodorovitch Shcherbakov; June 19, 1969 (age 57); Moscow, USSR
- Origin: Russian
- Genres: Classical music
- Occupations: Pianist, professor, composer
- Instrument: Piano
- Years active: 1990s – present
- Label: Melodiya
- Website: www.facebook.com/vasily.shcherbakov.5

Vasily Shcherbakov (Russian: Василий Фёдорович Щербаков, romanized: Vasily Fyodorovitch Shcherbakov; born June 19, 1969) is a Russian pianist, professor and composer.

Vasily Shcherbakov is a Candidate of Pedagogic Sciences (2010), a professor of the Moscow Conservatory, a professor of the faculty of culture of Russian State Social University.

Vasily Shcherbakov is a grand-nephew of the Russian composer Dmitry Kabalevsky and one of the leading performers and popularisers of Kabalevsky's music in the world.

== Biography ==
Vasily Shcherbakov was born in Moscow in 1969.

His father, Fyodor Shcherbakov (Russian: Фёдор Анатольевич Щербаков, Fyodor Anatolyevitch Shcherbakov) was a Candidate of Geographic Sciences, an Oceanologist, a Geologist, a Geographist, a Lithologist, and a senior research fellow of the Lithology and Marine Geology sub-Department of the Geology Department of Moscow State University as well as a senior research fellow of the Oceanology Institute of the USSR Academy of Sciences (currently known as Shirshov Institute of Oceanology).

His mother, Marina Shcherbakova (Russian: Марина Николаевна Щербакова, Marina Nikolaevna Shcherbakova) is a Gandidate of Geologic and Mineralogic Sciences, a senior research fellow of the Lithology and Marine Geology sub-Department of the Geology Department of Moscow State University with an honourable status given by the University.

Vasily Shcherbakov studied classical music from his early age. He graduated from the state school No. 875 in Moscow. He joined the Moscow Conservatory in 1989 and studied in the class of Prof. Elena Richter until 1994 when he graduated with excellence (magna cum laude).

Currently he performs at various locations around Russia and the world, teaches at the Moscow Conservatory, at Russian State Social University, gives lectures and master classes.

Previously he was a professor and the Director of the Piano Department of the Moscow State University of Culture and Arts, until 2015 a docent of the "Piano, Organ" Department M. Ippolitova-Ivanova Moscow State Music and Pedagogy Institute, and until 2013 a music teacher of the Moscow Galina Vishnevskaya College of Music and Theatre Arts.

== Music ==
Vasily Shcherbakov performs multiple concerts every year at various locations in Russia and around the globe.

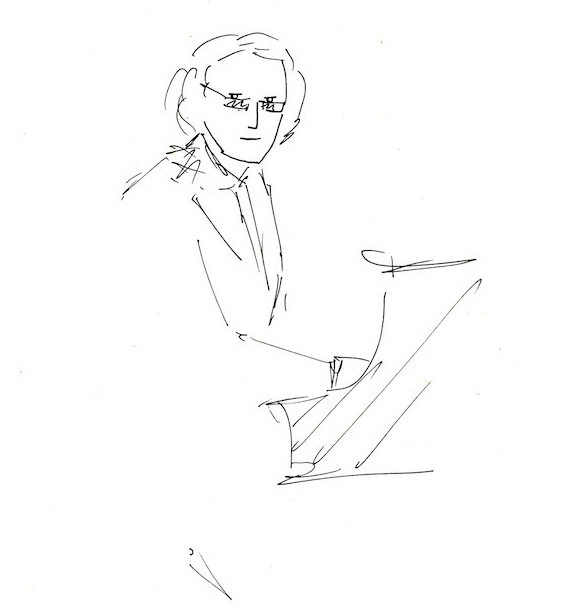
Vasily Shcherbakov performing at the Moscow College of Music and Theatre Arts #61 (2010)

Most notable scenes include the Moscow Conservatory, the Moscow International House of Music, the Tomsk Oblast State Philharmonic, the Perm Krai Philharmonic, Donzdorf Castle (Donzdorf, Germany), Richmond Music School (Richmond, British Columbia, Canada), Immanuel Baptist Church (Vancouver, British Columbia, Canada), and the Mirabell Palace (Salzburg, Austria).

He participates in organising and running multiple state-wise and international music festivals, and he's often being invited to be a part of music competitions' jury. He played a role in such events as:

- "Assembly in Mikhailovskoye" (Russian: "Ассамблея в Михайловском", "Assambleya v Mikhailovskom") (Pushkinskiye Gory, Russia);
- "International Shostakovich Chamber Music Competition" (Russian: "Международный конкурс камерных ансамблей им. Д. Д. Шостаковича в Москве", "Mejdunarodniy konkurs kamernyh ansambley imeni D. D. Shostakovicha v Moskve") (Moscow, Russia);
- "DSCH, Dmitri Shostakovich International Festival of Chamber Ensembles" (Russian: "DSCH, Международный фестиваль камерных ансамблей имени Д. Д. Шостаковича в Москве", "DSCH, Mezhdunarodny festival kamernyh ansambley imeni D. D. Shostakovicha v Moskve") (Moscow, Russia);
- "Playing Music Together With Friends" (Latvian: "Muzicējam kopā ar draugiem") (Dobele, Latvia);
- "ClaviCologne" (Cologne, Germany);
- "Malta International Music Festival" (Malta);
- "International Guitar Festival of the Island of Re; Festival Romantic Nights" (French: "Festival international de guitare de l’île de Ré; Festival Nuits Romanes") (Island of Re, France);
- "Slobozhanska Fantasy" (Russian: "Слобожанская фантазия", "Slobozhanskaya fantasia") (Sumy, Ukraine);
- "The 1st CAU International Piano Conference & Festival" (Seoul, South Korea);
- "SALZBURG = MOZART International Chamber Music Competition 2014" at Yamaha Ginza (Tokyo, Japan);
- "Kabalevsky Fest 2014" (Prague, Czech Republic; Moscow, Russia; Salzburg, Austria; Vienna, Austria);

Vasily Shcherbakov performs solo or as a part of a chamber ensemble. Previous chamber performances included, in addition to a piano, on various occasions, instruments such as strings, wind instruments, a theremin, an organ as well as vocal. Vasily Shcherbakov experimented with audio-visualisations.

During his performances he collaborates with a number of musicians, music ensembles and composers, most notably with the Zagreb Quartet (Croatian: Zagrebački kvartet), a French guitarist Philippe Villa, a Russian theremin performer Lydia Kavina, a Russian singer and Meritorious Artist of Russia and of Ukraine Alexander Tsilinko, a Russian violinist and Meritorious Artist of Russia Alexander Trostyansky, a Russian-Luxembourger violinist Alena Baeva, an Austrian violinist Luz Leskowitz and with the "Salzburg Soloists" ensemble.

Occasionally Vasily Shcherbakov makes an appearance on Russian radio and TV-channels on the shows designated to classical music.

The performances of Vasily Shcherbakov are well received by listeners, critics, musicians and composers.

== Kabalevsky ==
Vasily Shcherbakov plays an important role in popularising the works of his grand-uncle Dmitry Kabalevsky. He often includes compositions written by Kabalevsky in his programs. Some of Kabalevsky's works were premiered by the musician.

He serves as a head of jury of the "Kabalevsky Open International Music Competition" (Russian: "Открытый Московский международный конкурс имени Д. Б. Кабалевского", "Otkrytyi Moskovsky mezhdunarodny konkurs imeni D. B. Kabalevskogo").

He received a Candidate of Pedagogic Sciences title in 2010 by protecting a thesis based on Kabalevsky's works in pedagogy.

Vasily Shcherbakov is the president and a co-founder of the non-commercial Kabalevsky Fund founded in 2013. The fund is designated to promote professional music education, music culture and art.

== Discography ==
Vasily Shcherbakov recorded and published two studio albums under the Moscow-based Classical Records label.

- 2005 — Kabalevsky. 24 preludes. Sonata no.3 (Russian: Кабалевский. 24 прелюдии. Соната no.3)
- 2007 — Three Centuries of Piano (Russian: Три века фортепиано)

== Family ==
Vasily Shcherbakov is married to Anna Shcherbakova (Russian: Анна Иосифовна Щербакова, Anna Iosifovna Shcherbakova) who is a Doctor of Pedagogic Sciences, a Doctor of Culturology, and the Dean of Alfred Schnittke Moscow State Institute of Music. Anna Shcherbakova occasionally takes part as a master of ceremonies for Vasily Shcherbakov concerts. She is also one of the co-founders of the Kabalevsky Fund.
