= Harzburger Musiktage =

German music festival

- Genre: mostly classical music
- Begins: June
- Frequency: annual
- Locations: Bad Harzburg, Lower Saxony, Germany, various venues there and in the region
- Inaugurated: 1970; 56 years ago
- People: Luz Leskowitz
- Website: www.harzburger-musiktage.de

Harzburger Musiktage (Harzburg Music Days) is an annual festival of classical music in Bad Harzburg, Lower Saxony, Germany. It was founded in 1970 by Luz Leskowitz who was its artistic director until 2005. The third-oldest classical music festival in Lower Saxony, it features mostly chamber music with international performers.

== History ==
Bad Harzburg was a spa town from 1892, attracting an international clientele. The Harzburger Musiktage festival was founded there in 1970 by the violinist Luz Leskowitz from Salzburg, after the model of the Menuhin Festival Gstaad. He played with colleagues, including members of the Berlin Philharmonic and Wiener Philharmoniker, such as cellists Wolfgang Boettcher and Eberhard Finke, double bassist Ludwig Streicher, violist Ernst Wallfisch and his wife, pianist Lory Wallfisch. Leskowitz founded his own ensemble, the Salzburger Solisten (Salzburg Soloists) who gave their founding concert at the Kaiserpfalz Goslar as part of the 1979 festival.

In 1988, the concert series received recognition as an international festival. The annual festival has offered six to eight concerts in June. In the beginning, concerts were given in the old Casino, now the Kurhaus. Additional venues include the Lutherkirche in Bad Harzburg, the Kaiserpfalz Goslar and the Rittersaal of Schloss Bündheim. From 1988, the festival often had a regional motto, beginning with Dänemark zu Gast (Denmark visiting), followed on a focus on music from France, Austria, Dresden, Berlin and Hamburg. In 1989, the Ensemble Wien-Berlin gave its first public concert in Bad Harzburg. Founder Leskowitz was artistic director until 2005. It is the third-oldest classical music festival in Lower Saxony.

== Program ==
Since its beginning, world-renowned soloists, ensembles and orchestras have performed at the Harzburger Musiktage. Another focus are young performers, such as recipients of prizes at Jugend musiziert and other competitions.

In 2018, the festival featured a symphony concert in the Kursaal, with the Russian Chamber Philharmonic St. Petersburg conducted by Juri Gilbo, with David Geringas as the soloist in Dvořáks Cello Concerto. A series "Junge FestivalFans" offered programs for children and young listeners. The program for the 50th festival was more expanded, with soprano Simone Kermes, pianist Francesco Piemontesi, and the NDR Radiophilharmonie conducted by Andrew Manze, among others.

== Sponsoring ==
On 1 July 1972, the Gesellschaft zur Förderung der Harzburger Musiktage (Society for the support of Harzburger Musiktage) was founded. It helps financing the festival by contributions from its around 240 members as well as donations and funds from the state, the city, the spa and the broadcaster NDR. Until the German reunification in 1990, the festival was sponsored also by the Zonenrandförderung promoting regions near the border within Germany, Zonenrand. After the unification, the Society approached cultural foundations and companies to support the festival, to maintain its high standards.
