= Gyuli Kambarova =

Russian composer

Gyuli Kambarova Gyuli Nizamievna Kambarova
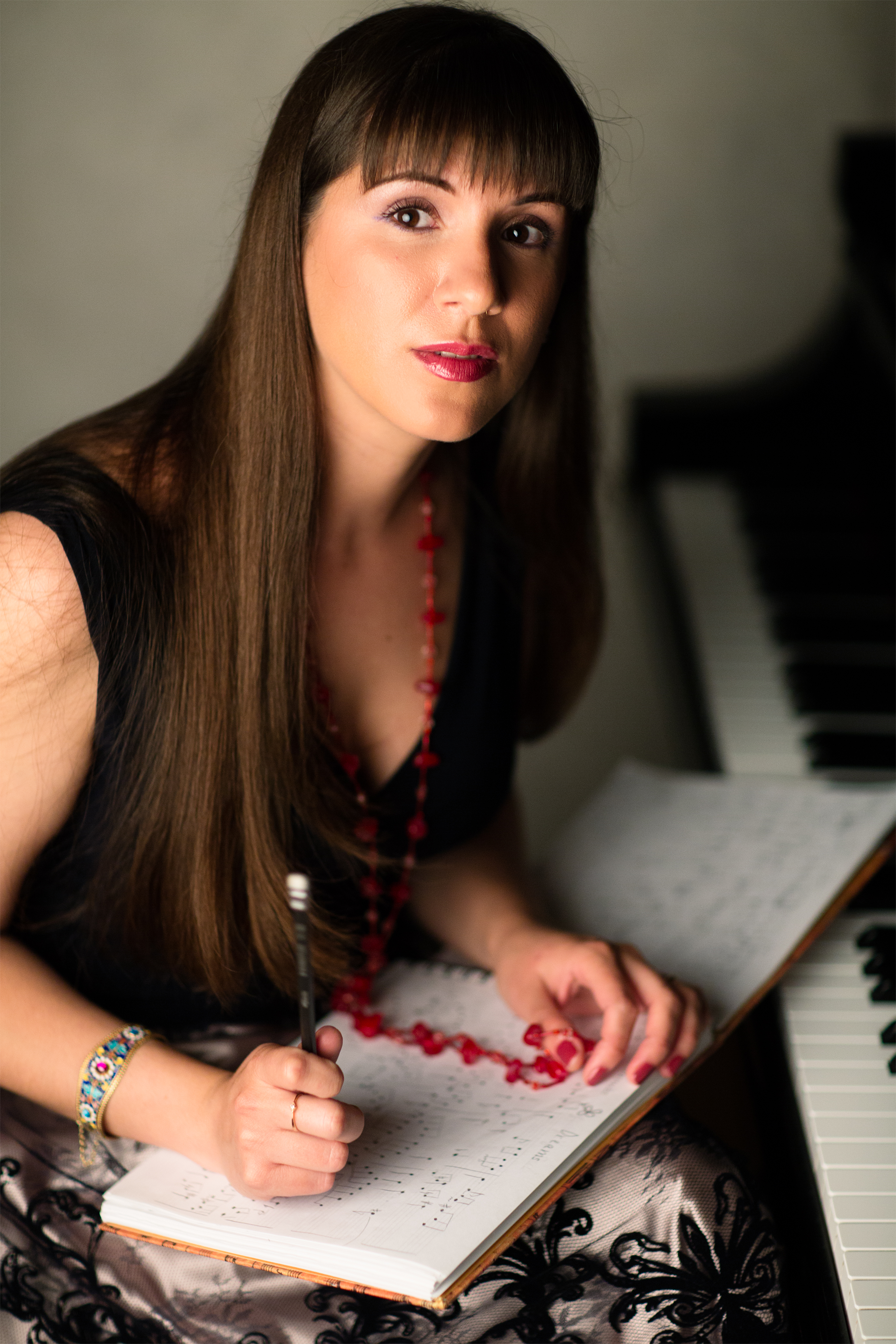

Background information
- Born: May 9, 1982 (age 44); Russia
- Genres: classical
- Occupation: Musician
- Instruments: Composition, Piano
- Years active: 2007–present
- Website: www.gyulikambarova.com

Gyuli Nizamievna Kambarova (Russian: Гюли Низамиевна Камбарова; 9 May 1982, Makhachkala, Russia) is a Dagestan and Russian composer who is a member of the Union of Composers of Russian Federation, member of the International Alliance for Women in Music, member of the Music Teachers National Association, and member of the Songwriters Guild of America. She authored the music for the documentaries "You Are Not Alone", "Voice for the Voiceless" and Fine Line directed by Anna Barsukova. She lives and works in United States.

== Biography ==
Gyuli Kambarova was born on May 9, 1982, in the city of Makhachkala in Republic of Dagestan, Russia. During her early music studies, she won several youth piano competitions, including I. S. Bach competition - II prize, G. Hasanov competition - II prize, and E. Grieg competition - III prize. In 1996, she started to study piano at the Makhachkala College of Music named after Gotfrid Hasanov with Svetlana Papayan. In 1999 she entered the Lyceum of Music at the Rostov State Conservatory named after Sergei Rachmaninoff. She graduated from the Rostov State Conservatory with degrees in piano performance (2005; Professor Natalia Simonova) and composition with honors (2010; Professor Galina Gontarenko).

Kambarova started her career in Southern Russia, where she composed music, performed as a soloist and collaborative pianist, as well as taught piano performance and composition. Her pieces of various genres gained recognition and were widely performed at concerts, festivals and competitions throughout Russia.

Currently Kambarova lives in the US, where she teaches at the faculty of the Louisville Academy of Music, Youth Performing Arts School and the University of Louisville School of Music. She sustains an active performing career, takes part in International music festivals and producing CD-albums with her original compositions. In 2019 she became a winner of the Commission Composer Competition organized by the Music Teachers National Association and was nominated for the Composer of the Year award, representing the state of Kentucky.

== Composing style ==
Kambarova's works are distinguished by their unique personal voice, which combines Southern Russia melodies with the rigorous classical technique. The composer writes music of various genres and instrumentation. Her most recent significant projects are the movie scores for the documentaries "You are not Alone" (Russia, 2017) and "Voice for the Voiceless" (Russia, 2019), directed by Anna Barsukova.

== Family ==
Husband, Samir Kambarov, is a saxophonist and serves of faculty of the University of Louisville as the lecturer in Jazz Studies. They are raising a son Timur.

== Awards ==
- Member of the Union of Composers of Russian Federation (since 2012)
- Member of the International Alliance for Women in Music (since 2014)
- Special Diplomas "for the Best Piece About Homeland" and "Composition Written on the Folk Text" at the 7th All-Russian Competition "Choir Laboratory XXI Century" (Russia, 2014)
- Laureate Diploma at the 8th All-Russian Composition Competition "Choir Laboratory XXI Century" in nomination ""Music on the Lyrics by Classical and Contemporary Poets" (Russia, 2015)
- Winner of the International Competition 15 Minutes of Fame: Re-Imagining Schubert (USA, 2015)
- Diploma for the music to the documentary "You are not Alone" at the Film Festival "Otzi i Deti" in the city of Oryol (Russia, 2017)
- Winner of the Annual Commissioned Composer Award by Kentucky Music Teachers Association (USA, 2019)

== Filmography ==
1. “You Are Not Alone!” – film by Anna Barsukova 2017
2. “Voice for the Voiceless” – film by Anna Barsukova 2019
3. “Fine Line” – film by Anna Barsukova 2022

== Discography ==
1. Dreams - piece for solo piano (2014)
2. My Way - instrumental music (2016)
3. Memories - cinema music (2018)

== List of compositions ==
- Piano sonata (3 mvts.)
- Suite "My Way" for alto saxophone, piano and percussion (3 mvts.: My Way, Baku, Caravan)
- Suite for alto saxophone and piano "Marine Pictures" (3 mvts.: Before the Storm, Cradle of the Sea, Neptune Feast)
- Christmas Suite for alto saxophone and piano (4 mvts.: Anticipation, Mischief, Confetti Flying, Sleigh Chase)
- Song Cycle to the verses by Rasul Gamzatov "In the Valley of the Peaks" (5 mvts.: Eagles are Silent, Dagestan, One Life, Sea, Swallow of Aul)
- Trio for violin, cello and piano (3 mvts.)
- Choral Suite to the verses by Rasul Gamzatov (5 mvts.: Freedom, What does the Day Bring to Us, Time, The Goal is Beautiful, Stop, Life Stop)
- Polyphonic Notebook for Piano
- Memorial Quintet for clarinet, violin, cello, piano and vibraphone
- Renaissance Quintet for soprano saxophone, violin, cello, piano and vibraphone
- Sonata for 2 clarinets and piano (3 mvts.)
- Concerto for violin and orchestra (3 mvts.)
- String Quartet (4 mvts.)
- Trio "Soul of Love" for violin, cello and piano
- Trio "Falling Leaves" for violin, cello and piano
- Romance for cello and piano
- Prelude Cycle "Dreams" for piano solo
- Suite "Californication" for piano solo
- Film Music for documentary "You are not Alone"
- Film Music for documentary "Voice for the Voiceless"
- Quintette "Unchained" for alto saxophone, violin, cello, piano and percussion (3 mvts.)
