= Louisville Youth Orchestra =

The Louisville Youth Orchestra (LYO) was founded in 1958 in Louisville, Kentucky. The orchestra caters for young people from grade school through age 21. The LYO is made up of four orchestras, two elementary string programs, and various ensembles in which students advance according to their own musical progression and interests. There are nearly 400 musicians from 60 schools and 15 counties in the Louisville & Southern Indiana metro area.

== History ==
The LYO began in the fall of 1958 as an outgrowth of a six-week summer orchestral program sponsored by the Louisville Academy of Music. With Rubin Sher as conductor, William Sloane as assistant, and the academy's president, Robert French, as manager, approximately fifty young musicians began rehearsals at the academy that September. By December the fledgling Academy Youth Orchestra had grown to seventy members drawn from seventeen area schools, and had outgrown the academy's rehearsal facilities. On the 30th of that month the group gave its first public concert in the old Columbia Auditorium. Two days earlier it had made its community debut playing excerpts from Prokofiev's Peter and the Wolf in a taped performance broadcast on WHAS TV.

Variously known as the Academy Youth Orchestra, the County Youth Orchestra, the All-County Youth Orchestra, and the Louisville-Jefferson County Youth Orchestra, it has finally settled on, and restored, its 1960 name of incorporation, the Louisville Youth Orchestra.

Over the years the LYO has also called many places home: the old academy on York Street, the Shrine Temple, the Columbia (now Spalding) Auditorium, the old Armory (now Louisville Gardens), the Louisville Convention Center, Atherton High School, and most recently, the facilities of the Youth Performing Arts School.

Throughout its history it has known outstanding music directors: Rubin Sher beginning in 1958, Daniel Spurlock beginning in 1975, Jim Bates beginning in 1996, Robert Franz beginning in 2001, and Jason Seber beginning in 2005. These accomplished directors have led the orchestra through hundreds of concerts in the community, on tour throughout Kentucky, to the governor's mansion and the State Fair on numerous occasions, to Chicago, Pittsburgh, Nashville, Buffalo, Columbus (IN), and even to the International Festival of Youth Orchestras in Lausanne, Switzerland, in 1971. They have been the friends and mentors of literally thousands of LYO members.

The orchestra has premiered compositions by Nelson Keyes, Gonzalo Roig, Federico Rojas, David McHugh, Samuel Adler, Peter McHugh, Carol McClure (an alumna of the LYO), Paul Nahay, Don Knaack, and others. It has performed with guest conductors, including Robert Whitney, Karl Haas, Sidney Harth, Jack Herriman, Carlo Mastropaolo, Akira Endo, Uri Segal, Jorge Mester, and Lawrence Leighton Smith. Guest artists include Paul Kling, Miriam Fried, Daniel Heifitz, Lee Luvisi, Greg Fulkerson (an alumnus of the LYO), Leon Rapier, Marion Gibson, Frank Fuge, Leon Bibb, and Peter McHugh.

== Divisions ==
The LYO is not a single orchestra. It is rather a compilation of two educational programs and five performing groups. The requirements for each performing group vary and placement is determined by an audition. The following is a list of the five groups (from most advanced to amateur) followed by the two educational programs.

- Symphony Orchestra (full orchestra)
- Repertory Orchestra (most orchestral instruments)
- Concert Orchestra (all strings)
- Serenade Orchestra (all strings)
- Percussion Ensemble (percussion only)
- Horizons Brass (brass only)
- Horizons Flutes (middle and high school groups)

== Policy ==
Musicians are required to participate in their school instrumental music programs and must take private music instruction. Financial scholarships for instruction are available and awarded based on need. Performance opportunities provide a wide range of meaningful experiences from September through June each year.

== Funding ==
The orchestra receives partial support from the Greater Louisville Fund for the Arts. Patron contributions, membership fees, ticket sales, and the fund all help to keep the four orchestras (serenade, concert, repertory, and symphony), two elementary string programs, and various ensembles busily making music.
