= Oistrakh =

Oistrakh may refer to either of two violinists:

- David Oistrakh (1908–1974), renowned Soviet classical violinist
- Igor Oistrakh (1931–2021), Ukrainian violinist, son of David
