= Valery Vorona =

- Валерий Ворона
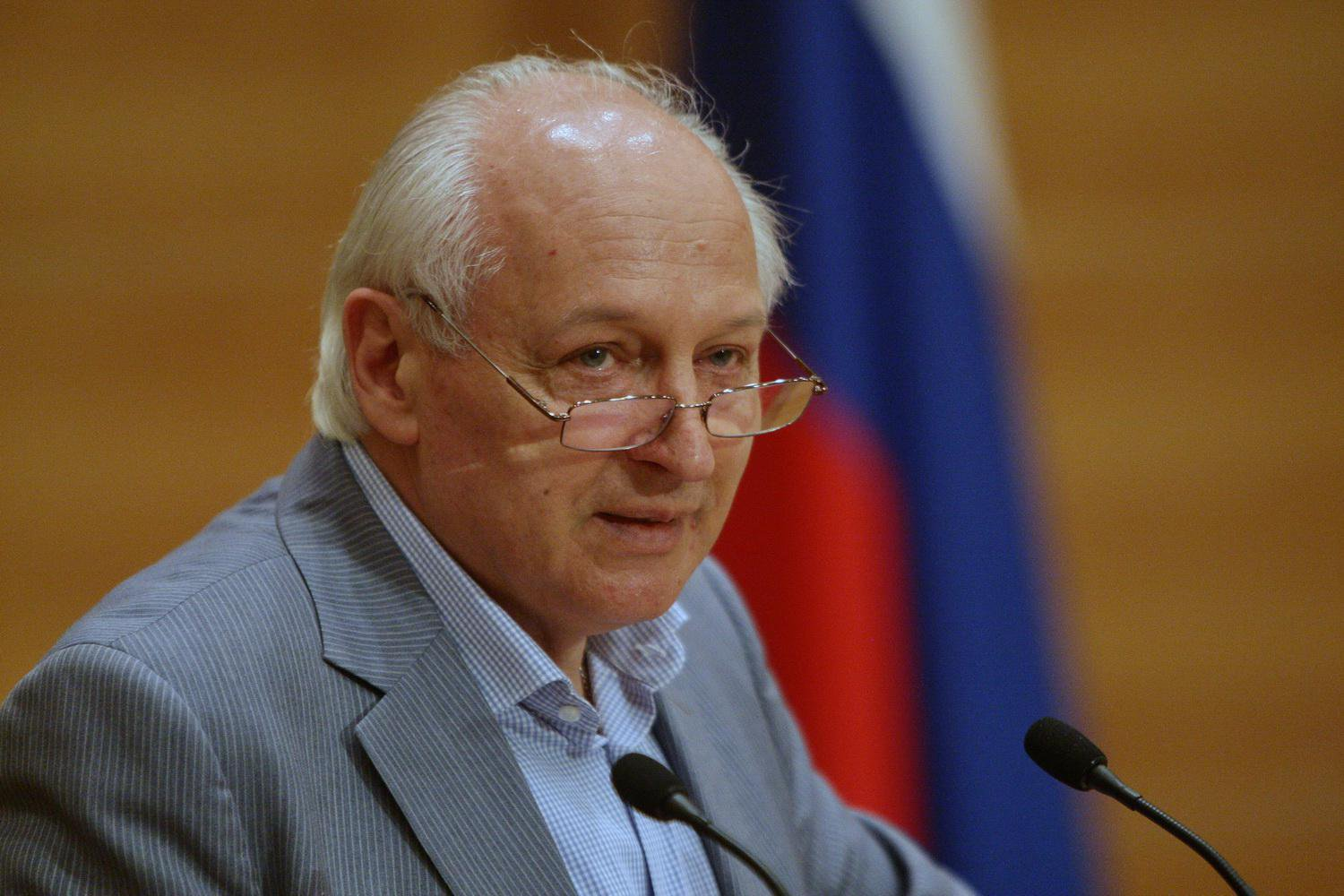
- Born: December 12, 1950 (age 75); Kherson, Ukrainian SFSR, Soviet Union
- Education: Gnessin State Musical College; Moscow Conservatory
- Occupations: Violinist, conductor
- Awards: Order of Friendship

Valery Iosifovich Vorona (Russian: Валерий Иосифович Ворона; born 12 December 1950) is a Russian violinist, soloist, conductor, and Merited Artist of the Russian Federation. Vorona graduated from the Gnessin State Musical College and was a post-graduate student at the Moscow Conservatory where he later became a professor. Later on he became a conductor and teacher in positions which added to his career. Currently he is both artistic director and conductor-in-chief of the Moscow Chamber Orchestra for young violinists as well as a soloist of the Moscow Philharmonic Orchestra and a President of the Russian Performing Art Foundation. He also serves as a rector at the Ippolitov-Ivanov Music Pedagogical Institute and by 2008 became both conductor and soloist of the Saint Petersburg International Economic Forum. He has participated at various festivals such as the Russian Festival in San Francisco as well as Vladimir Spivakov Festival and Sakharov Festival in Nizhny Novgorod. Besides national performances he has also performed overseas in such countries as France, Greece, Israel, Italy, Spain, the United States and various former Soviet republics. He has appeared with many well-known conductors including Ukrainian Oleh Krysa and Oleksandr Bondurianskyi and the Russian conductors Valentin Berlinsky, Vladimir Ponkin, Vladimir Repin, Yuri Bashmet, and Maxim Vengerov.

== Awards ==
In 2009 the Hamburg Academy of Music had awarded him with International Prize for the development of the Eastern European culture and in 2013 both him and Maxim Vengerov shared Ippolitov-Ivanov International award the presentation of which took place at the Big Hall of the Moscow Conservatory.
