= Louisville Academy of Music =

Coordinates: 38°15′15.4″N 85°41′30.7″W

The Louisville Academy of Music is a non-profit community music school in Louisville, Kentucky in the Crescent Hill neighborhood. Founded in 1954 by Robert French and Donald Murray, the academy has given over a million music lessons. It originally operated from three rented rooms in Highlands area of Louisville and moved to its current location in 1971.

The academy currently offers lessons in piano, strings, voice, woodwinds, brass, guitar, and percussion for students of all ages. The present building on Frankfort Avenue consists of studios, a recital hall, a library and archive that contains thousands of books, records, and files on Kentucky musicians and organizations. The academy has presented more than a thousand programs and has trained over ten thousand students, many of whom have become composers, teachers, chamber music performers and members of major orchestras.

Robert French won the 1999 Governor's Awards in the Arts for his work with the school.

The Louisville Academy of Music won the 2024 Governor's Awards in the Arts for Education.
