= Iashvili =

Iashivili (Georgian: იაშვილი) is the Georgian surname, which may refer to:

- The Iashvili (family)
- Alexander Iashvili (born 1977), Georgian football player
- Paolo Iashvili (1894–1937), Georgian poet
- Sandro Iashvili (born 1985), Georgian football player
- Gia Jashvili, Georgian-Austrian violinist
- Marine Jashvili (1932–2012), or Yashvili, Georgian violinist, and aunt of Gia Jashvili
- Nana Jashvili, or Yashvili, Georgian-Austrian violinist, and mother of Gia Jashvili
- Dimitri Yachvili (born 1980), the French rugby player of Georgian origin
- Michel Yachvili (born 1946), the French rugby player of Georgian origin

== See also ==
- Jashvili, alternative spelling in German
- Yachvili, alternative spelling in French
