= Jashvili =

Jashvili is a Georgian surname of Iashvili written in German. Notable people with the surname include:

- Gia Jashvili, Georgian-Austrian violinist
- Marine Jashvili (1932–2012), Georgian violinist, and aunt of Gia Jashvili
- Nana Jashvili, Georgian-Austrian violinist, and mother of Gia Jashvili

== See also ==
- Yachvili
