= Yachvili =

Yachvili (Georgian: იაშვილი) is a Georgian surname of Iashvili written in French.

It is the surname of two rugby union players (father and son) who both played for France.

- Dimitri Yachvili (born 1980), mostly played for Biarritz
- Michel Yachvili, (born 1946), mostly played for Brive

== See also ==
- Jashvili
