= Vladimir Mikhailovich Yashvil =

Russian general of Georgian noble origin

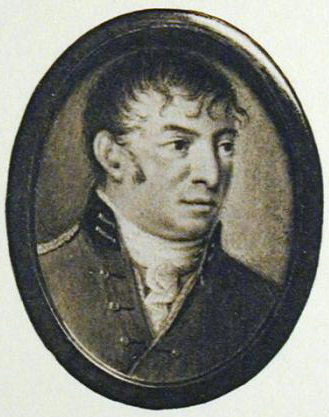

Prince Vladimir Mikhailovich Yashvil (Russian: Владимир Михайлович Яшвиль; Georgian: ვლადიმერ იაშვილი) (July 15, 1764 – July 20, 1815) was a Russian general of Georgian noble origin (Iashvili) personally involved in the assassination of Paul I of Russia (1801). He was a brother of General Lev Yashvil.

== Biography ==
Born to an émigré Georgian noble family in the village Muromtseva, Kaluga Governorate, Yashvil graduated from a cadet corps in 1786 and took part in the Russo-Turkish War (1787–1792) and the Polish campaigns (1792, 1794). He commanded various artillery units and was promoted to major general in 1800. That year, he joined several Russian officers in a palace coup against Paul I and, along with General Bennigsen assassinated the tsar in Saint Michael's Castle. Paul's successor Alexander I, allegedly the coup sympathizer, soon sacked Yashvil. Being prohibited from visiting both St. Petersburg and Moscow, Yashvil spent next several years in a compulsory retirement at his estate. During Napoleon's invasion of Russia in 1812, Yashvil managed to obtain permission from General Dmitry Shepelev to join the Kaluga militia and helped recover Yelnya. However, upon Alexander I's order, the Russian commander Kutuzov dismissed Yashvil who returned to his estate.
