= Marine Jashvili =

Georgian violinist (1932–2012)

Marine Jashvili (Georgian: მარინე იაშვილი; also known as Marine Yashvili and Marina Yashvili, the latter forms reflecting Russian transliteration; Russian: Маринэ Луарсაბовна Яшвили; 2 October 1932, Tbilisi – 9 July 2012, Moscow) was a Georgian violinist and professor, regarded as one of the major figures of the Russian violin school in the 20th century. She was a professor at the Moscow Conservatory for more than five decades and was named People's Artist of the Georgian SSR, Honoured Artist of Russia, and recipient of Georgia's Shota Rustaveli State Prize. A prize winner at the Kubelík International Competition, the Henryk Wieniawski Violin Competition, and the Queen Elizabeth Music Competition, she was among the first Georgian classical musicians to achieve international recognition through major European competitions. She was a sister of violinist Nana Jashvili and aunt of violinist Gia Jashvili.

== Early life and family ==
Jashvili was born in Tbilisi into a distinguished Georgian musical family. Her father, Luarsab Seitovich Jashvili, was a Georgian violinist, violist, and long-serving professor at the Tbilisi Conservatory, and an Honoured Art Worker of the Georgian SSR. Georgian biographical sources describe Marine Jashvili as both his daughter and pupil. All three of his daughters — Marine, Irine, and Nana — became professional violinists. Marine began violin studies with her father at the age of six. At nine she made her stage debut at the Rustaveli Theatre in Tbilisi, performing the Beriot concerto with orchestra under conductor Alexander Gauk. By the age of eleven she was performing regularly. During the Second World War she gave solo concerts for troops at the front, for which she was awarded the Medal for the Defence of the Caucasus at the age of thirteen. David Oistrakh, upon hearing the teenage Jashvili, remarked: "This young violinist possesses virtuosic abilities and a colourful, artistic temperament."

== Education ==
In 1948 Jashvili graduated from the Paliashvili Music School in Tbilisi. From 1951 to 1954 she studied at the Moscow Conservatory in the class of Konstantin Mostras, a central figure of the Russian violin tradition and teacher of Ivan Galamian. Mostras praised his student for her "beautiful, full tone, highly developed sense of style, strict and sustained interpretation, nobility of taste, musical initiative, and genuine virtuosity." In 1957 she completed her postgraduate studies (aspirantura) at the Conservatory, subsequently serving as assistant to Mostras. Throughout her career Jashvili performed on a Stradivarius violin acquired for her by the Republic of Georgia from her teacher Mostras, on which she played for the remainder of her life.

== Competition career ==
Jashvili won prizes at three major international violin competitions, becoming the first Georgian classical musician to achieve international recognition through competition success in Europe:

- Kubelík International Competition, Prague, 1949 — 5th prize
- Wieniawski International Violin Competition, Poznań, 1952 — 3rd prize (shared with Blanche Tarjus and Olga Parkhomenko; 1st prize was awarded to Igor Oistrakh)
- Queen Elizabeth Music Competition, Brussels, 1955 — prize winner. David Oistrakh, a jury member, wrote: "The undoubted talent of Marine Yashvili, her impeccable mastery and the creative temperament of the young artist were duly appreciated by the jury."

== Performance career ==
From 1957 Jashvili was a soloist of the Moscow Philharmonic. She performed as soloist with the Royal Concertgebouw Orchestra in Amsterdam and toured extensively across Europe and beyond, including Sweden, Italy, Germany, France, the Czech Republic, Iceland, Denmark, Yugoslavia, Mexico, Israel, and South America. She collaborated with conductors including Roberto Benzi, Kurt Masur, Yevgeny Svetlanov, Gennady Rozhdestvensky, and Eri Klas, and appeared in chamber music alongside Igor Oistrakh, Eduard Grach, Natalia Shakhovskaya, and others. Georgian encyclopedic sources describe Jashvili as an important promoter of Georgian violin music and note that her repertoire was broad and varied, combining standard classical works with music by Georgian composers. From 1966, Jashvili returned to Tbilisi, where she co-founded the Georgian State Chamber Orchestra together with her husband, violinist Igor Politkovsky, and served as its artistic director. Georgian sources identify her as soloist and artistic director of the Georgian Philharmonic Chamber Orchestra from 1967 to 1973. The orchestra later passed to conductor Liana Isakadze, who brought the ensemble to Germany, where it was adopted by the city of Ingolstadt and continues today as the Georgisches Kammerorchester Ingolstadt. Georgian composers wrote new works for Jashvili during this period. In 2008 a recording of works by Brahms, Schumann, Kreisler, Ysaÿe, Machavariani, and Saint-Saëns was released in Georgia, with pianist Igor Chernyshov.

== Teaching career ==
Jashvili began her teaching career while still a student at the Moscow Conservatory. From 1958 to 1966 she taught at the Conservatory, before returning to Tbilisi where she taught at the Tbilisi Conservatory. She subsequently worked at the Academy of Arts in Novi Sad (then Yugoslavia, now Serbia) from 1975 to 1979, where Georgian sources describe her as head of the violin department and professor. She returned to the Moscow Conservatory and remained there for the rest of her career, teaching until the end of her life — a total of over 55 years devoted to teaching. She gave regular masterclasses in Germany, Switzerland, Spain, France, Poland, Japan, and Tbilisi. Among her students was Slovene violinist Benjamin Izmajlov. Her nephew, Gia Jashvili, is an Austrian violinist with an international career as soloist, concertmaster, and pedagogue.

== Recognition ==
- Honoured Artist of the Georgian SSR (1958)
- People's Artist of the Georgian SSR (1967)
- Order of the Red Banner of Labour (1971)
- State Prize of the Georgian SSR named after Z.P. Paliashvili (1975)
- Merited Worker of Polish Culture (1996)
- Order of Honour of Georgia (1996)
- Honoured Artist of Russia (1997)
- Shota Rustaveli State Prize (2003)

== Death ==
Marine Jashvili died on 9 July 2012 in Moscow.
