= Vydubychi Monastery =

Orthodox Christian monastery in Kyiv, Ukraine

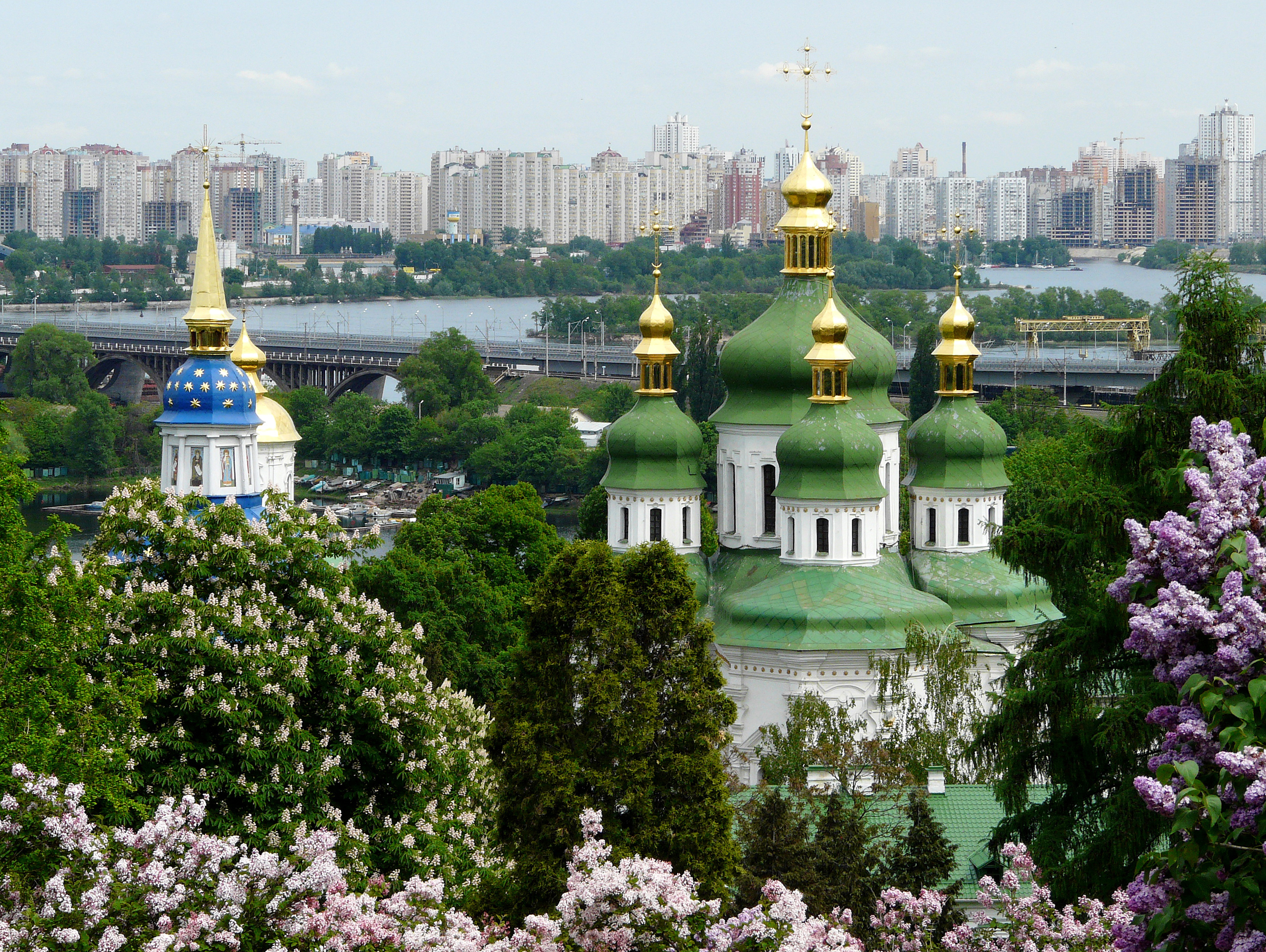

- Location within Ukraine

Monastery information
- Established: 1070
- Diocese: Ukrainian Orthodox Church - Kyiv Patriarchate
- Controlled churches: Collegiate Church of Saint Michael; St. George Cathedral; Saviour Church and refectory

People
- Founder: Vsevolod Yaroslavich

Site
- Location: Kyiv, Ukraine
- Coordinates: 50.4168°N 30.5674°E
- Other information: Ownership: Orthodox Church of Ukraine

Immovable Monument of National Significance of Ukraine
- Official name: Видубецький монастир (Vydubychi Monastery)
- Type: Architecture
- Reference no.: 260109

The Vydubychi Monastery (Ukrainian: Видубицький монастир, romanized: Vydubytskyi monastyr) is a historic monastery in the Ukrainian capital Kyiv. During the Soviet period it housed the NANU Institute of Archaeology.

== History ==
The monastery was established between 1070 and 1077 by Vsevolod, son of Yaroslav the Wise. It was a family cloister of Vsevolod's son Vladimir Monomakh and his descendants.

The monastery, and the neighbourhood in present-day Kyiv where it is located, was named after an old Slavic legend about the pagan god Perun and the Grand Prince Vladimir the Great of Kyiv. The word "Vydubychi" comes from the word Vydobychi → Vydobych → Vydobech (Ukrainian: Видобичі → Видобич → Видобеч) which means "to swim up", "emerge from water".

The legend has it that Vladimir ordered the wooden figures of Perun (the Thunder God) and other pagan gods dumped into the Dnieper River during the mass Baptism of Kyiv. The disheartened Kyivans, though accepting the baptism, ran along the Dnieper River calling for the old gods to emerge from water (Перуне выдуби!). Accordingly, the area down the river stream where Perun emerged was named Vydubichu or Vydubychi in modern Ukrainian.

The monastery operated the ferry across the Dnieper River, and many of the best scholars of that time lived and worked there. Among them, chroniclers Sylvestr of Kiev and Moisey made a great contribution to writing the Tale of Bygone Years.

From the 1596 Union of Brest the Monastery was an official seat of the first three metropolitans of the Greek Catholic Church in Ukraine — Mykhajlo Rohoza, Ipatii Potii and Yosyf Rutskyi. In 1635. it was returned to the Ukrainian Orthodox Church.

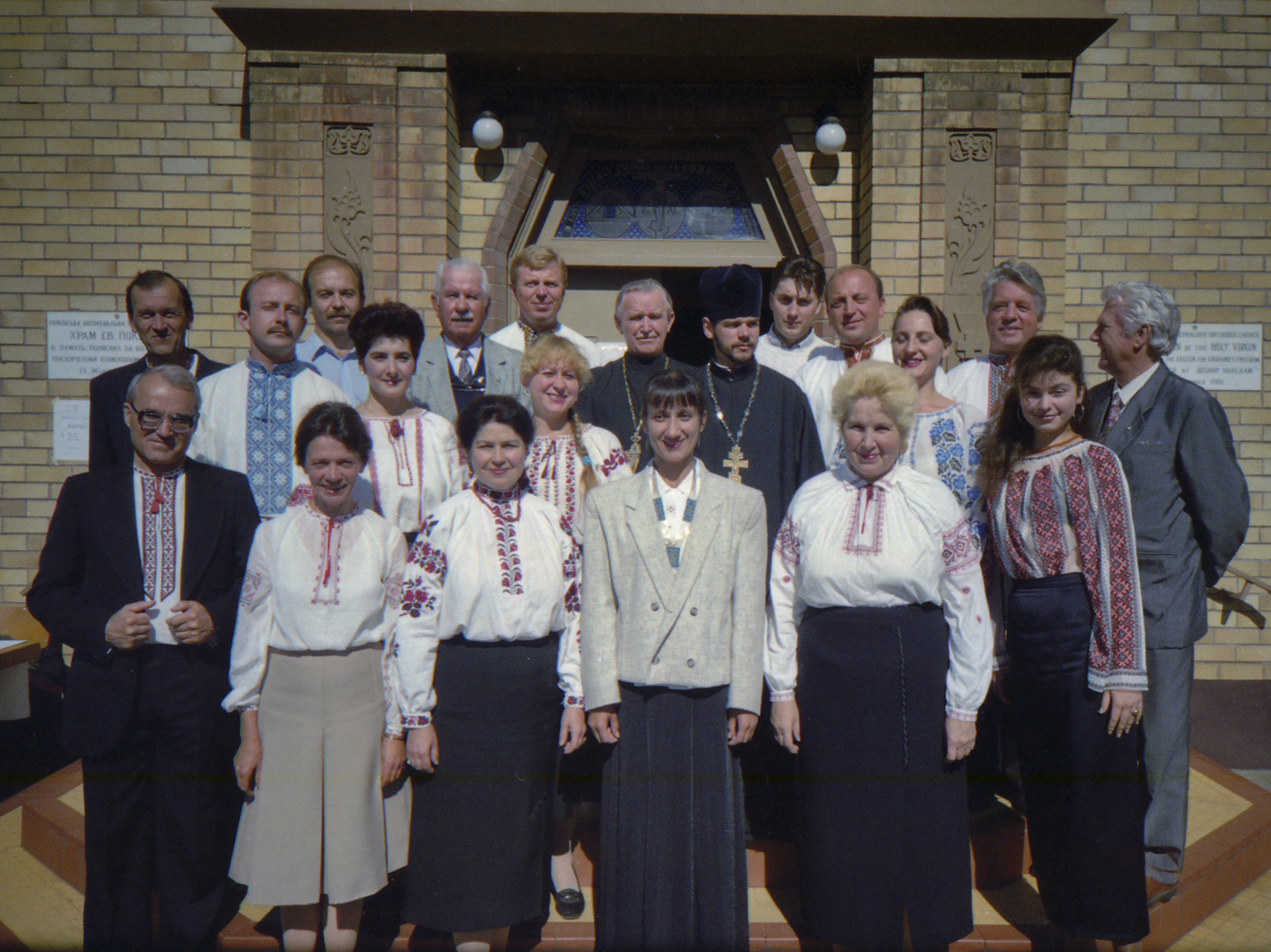
Vydubychi Church Choir in 1996

The monastery was continuously protected by Ukraine's hetmans and aristocratic families. Hetman Ivan Mazepa in 1695 forbade the Vydubytskyi Monastery's neighbors to "do injustice to the monastery" and placed it under the guard of Starodub Regiment Col. Mykhailo Myklashevskyi, who established the Baroque-style Church of St. George and new Transfiguration Refectory. Hetman Danylo Apostol subsidised construction of the monastery's bell tower. In the 18th century the help of Hetman Kyrylo Rozumovsky's ensured new properties for the Vydubychi Monastery.

Since the late 1990s, the monastery is administered by the Ukrainian Orthodox Church — Kyiv Patriarchate. The Vydubychi Church Choir was among the first choirs in newly independent Ukraine to reinstate singing of the Divine Liturgy in the Ukrainian language.

== Buildings and structures ==
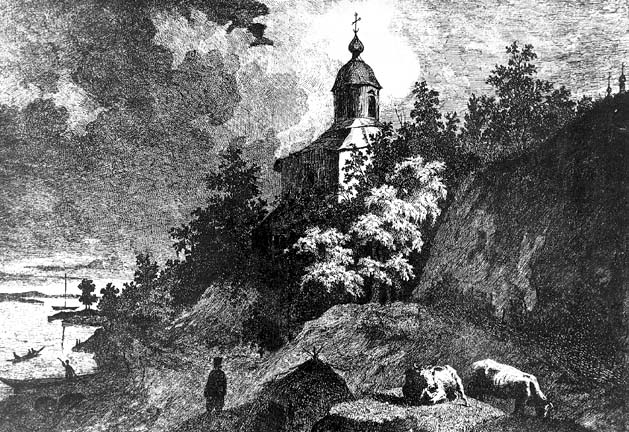
St Michael Church in Vydubychi, as depicted by Taras Shevchenko

Only a few churches of this monastery have survived over the centuries. One of these is the Collegiate Church of Saint Michael, which was built on behest of Vsevolod I and partly reconstructed between 1766 and 1769 by Russian architect M. I. Yurasov. The Ukrainian baroque structures include the magnificent 5-domed St. George Cathedral, Transfiguration of the Saviour Church and refectory, all dating from 1696-1701. A belltower, commissioned by the Hetman Danylo Apostol, was erected in 1727-33 and built up in 1827-31.

- Saint Michael Church
- Saint George Cathedral
- Refectory with Savior-Transfiguration Church
- Chapel of the Saint Michael Church
- Fraternity building
- Building of the abbot
- Necropolis

=== Necropolis ===
Many distinguished individuals are buried there, including:

- Y. Handzyuk — Commander of the First Ukrainian Corps (1918), executed by the Bolsheviks.
- Bogdan Khanenko (1848–1917) collector and patron of the arts, his collection was moved to the Kyiv Museum of Art and Industry after his death.
- Konstantin Ushinsky (1823–1871) — pedagogue, advocate of teaching in Ukrainian (which was prohibited in the Russian Empire in the second half of the 19th century according to the Ems Ukase).
- Vladimir Alekseyevich Betz (1834–1896) — anatomist famous for his discovery of giant pyramidal motoneurons which are now called Betz cells.
- Lev Mikhailovich Yashvil (1768–1836) — artillery general during the Napoleonic Wars.
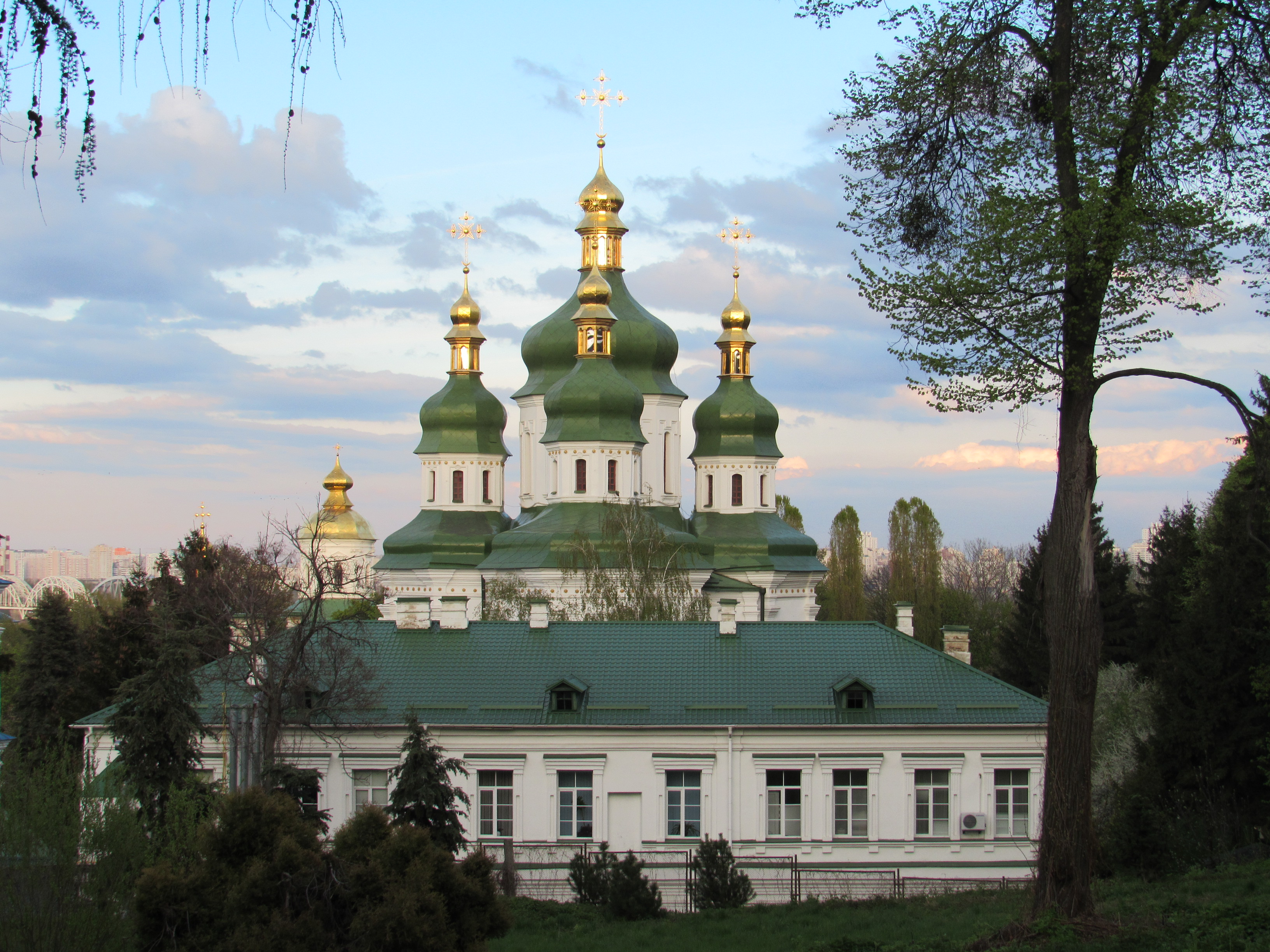
Vydubychi Monastery

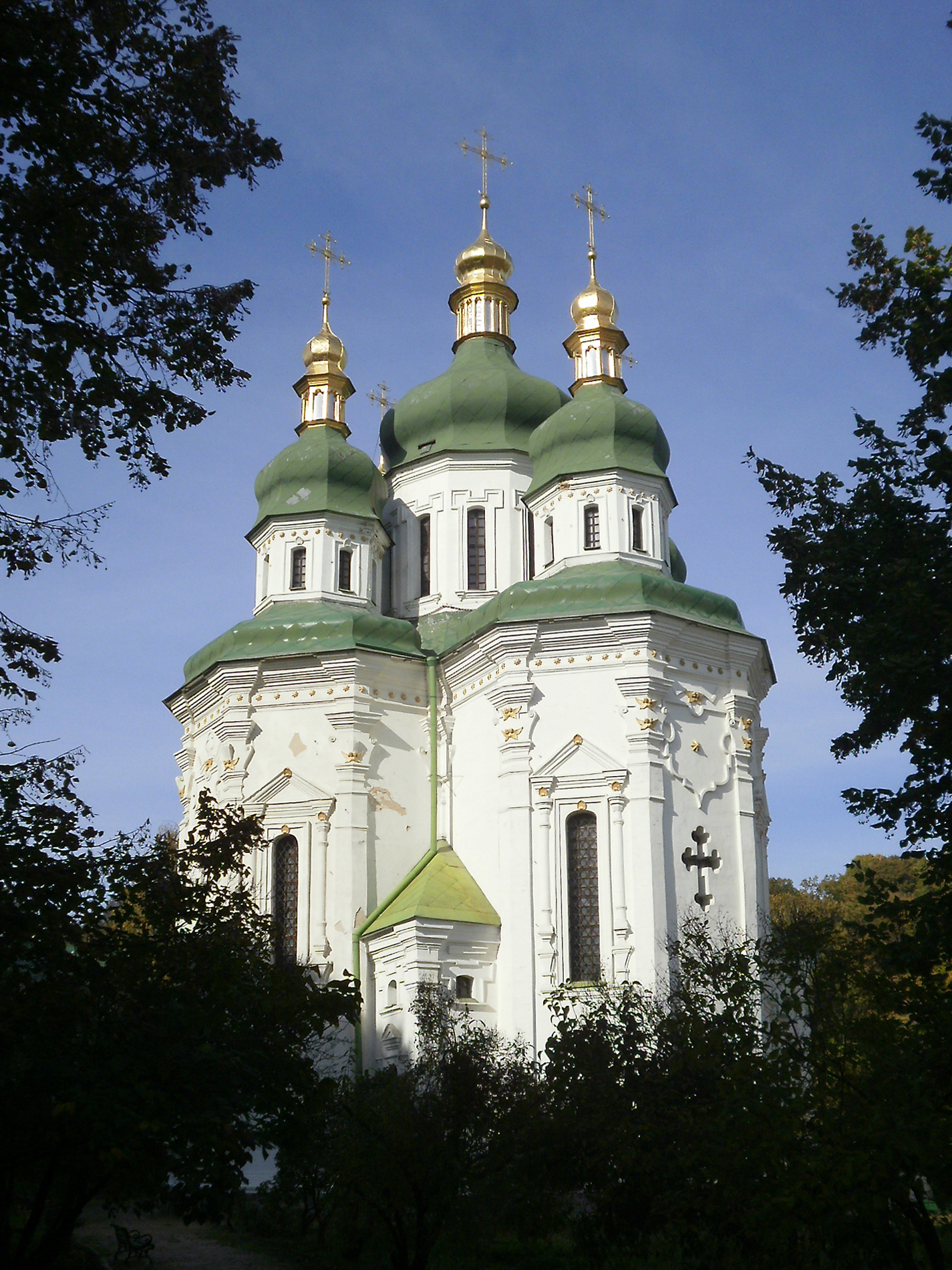
St. George's Cathedral

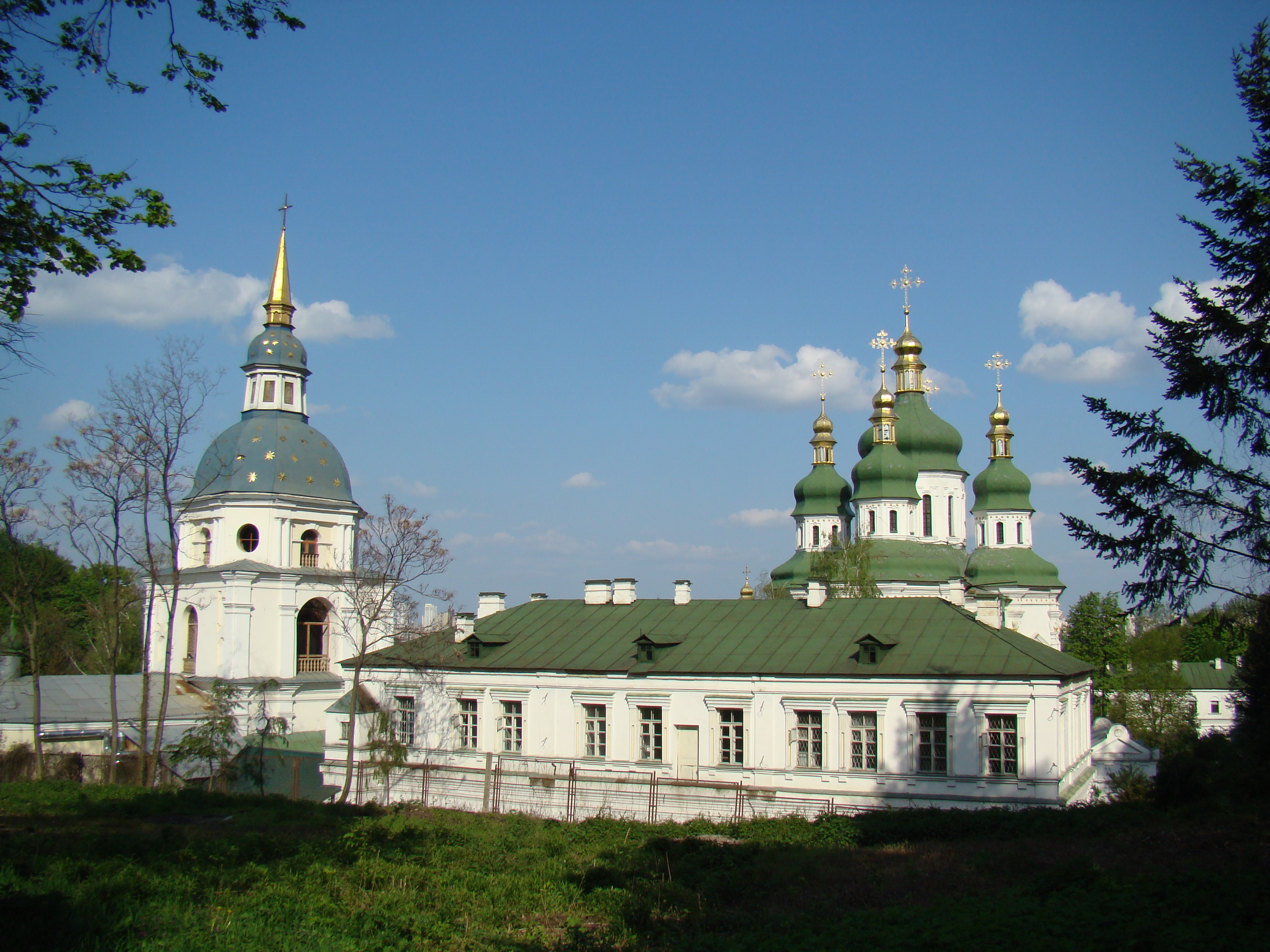
The Bell Tower (left) and the Abbot's House (right)

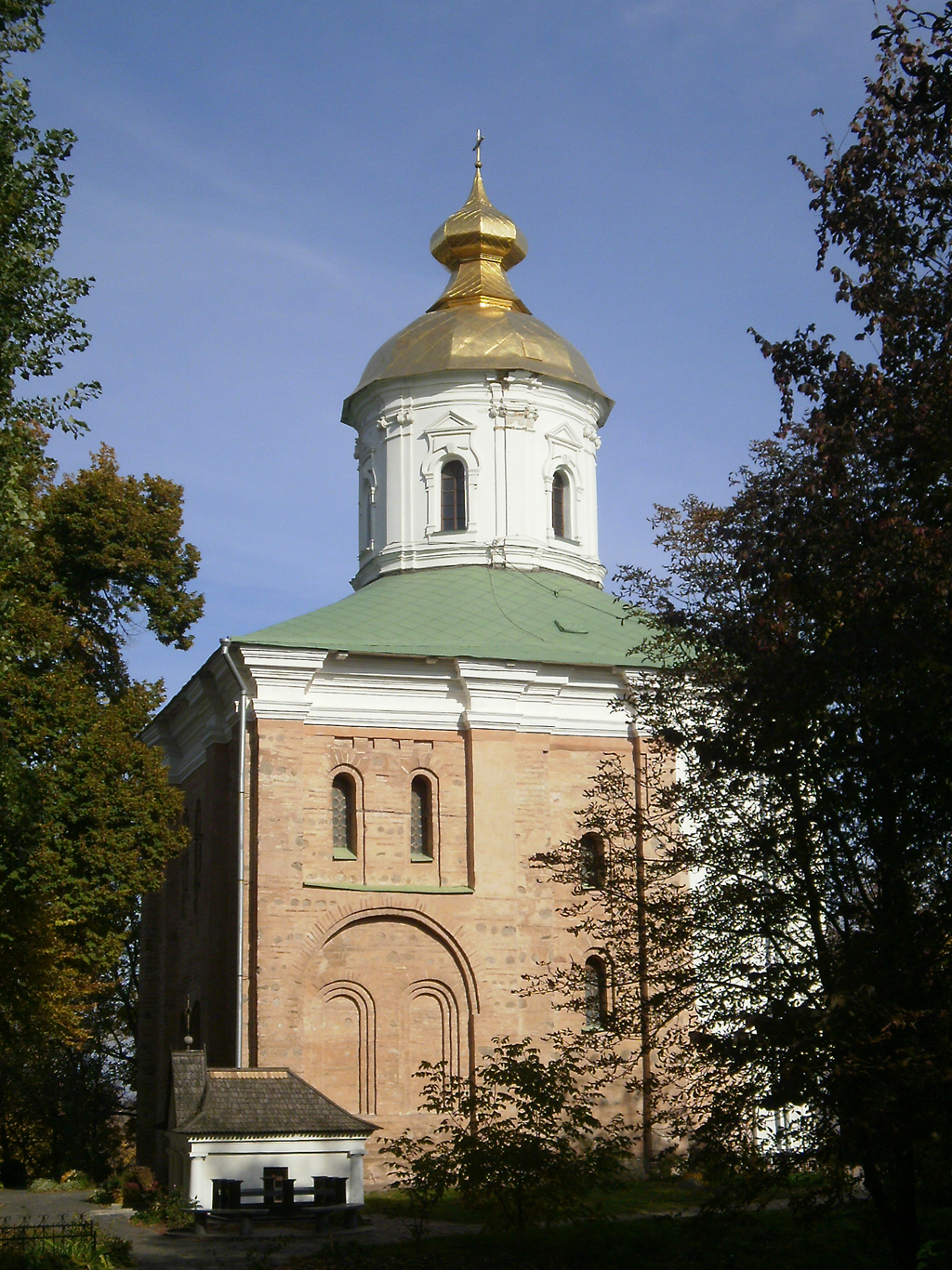
St. Michael's Church

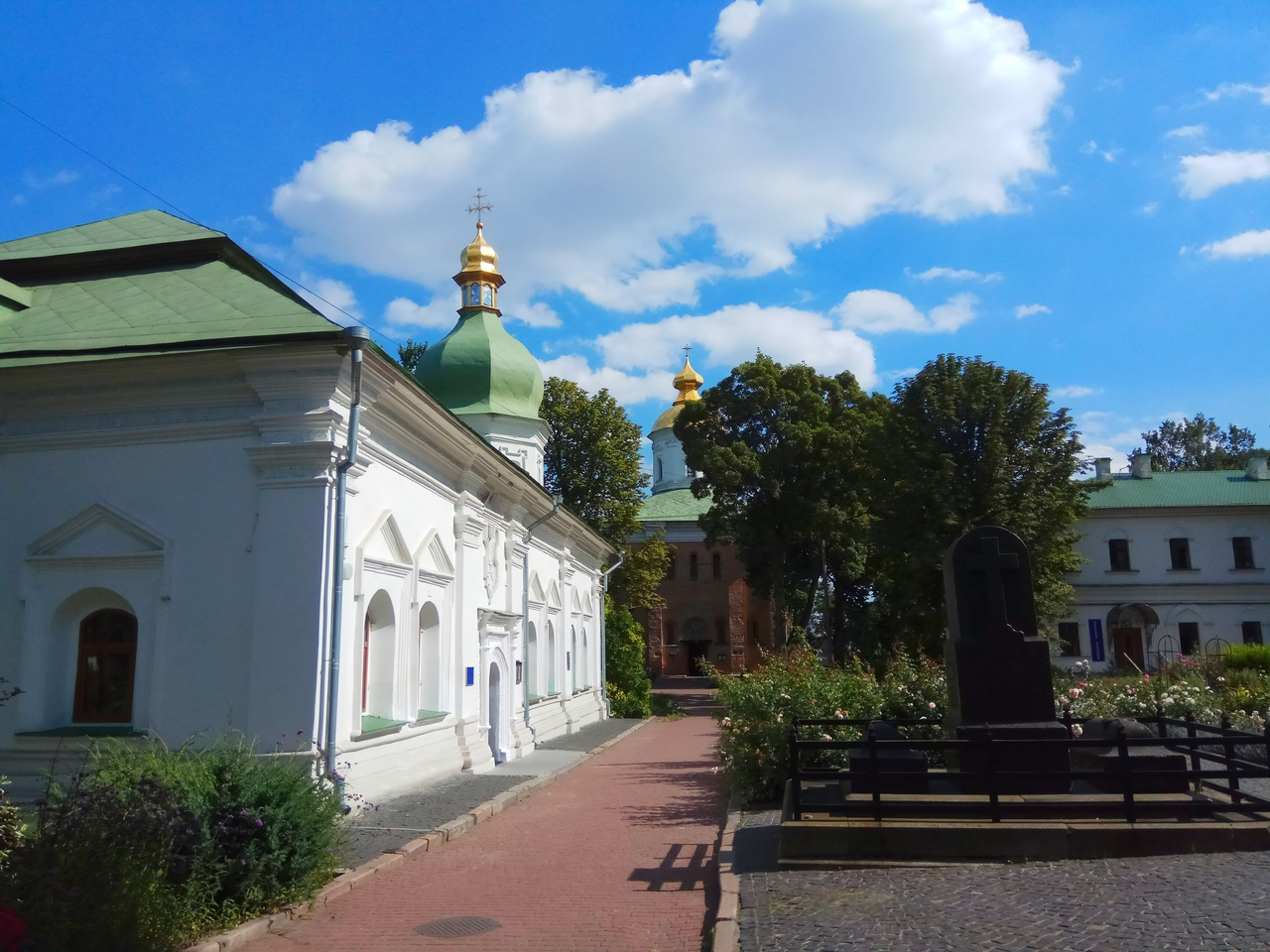
The Refectory (left) and the Fraternity Building (right)

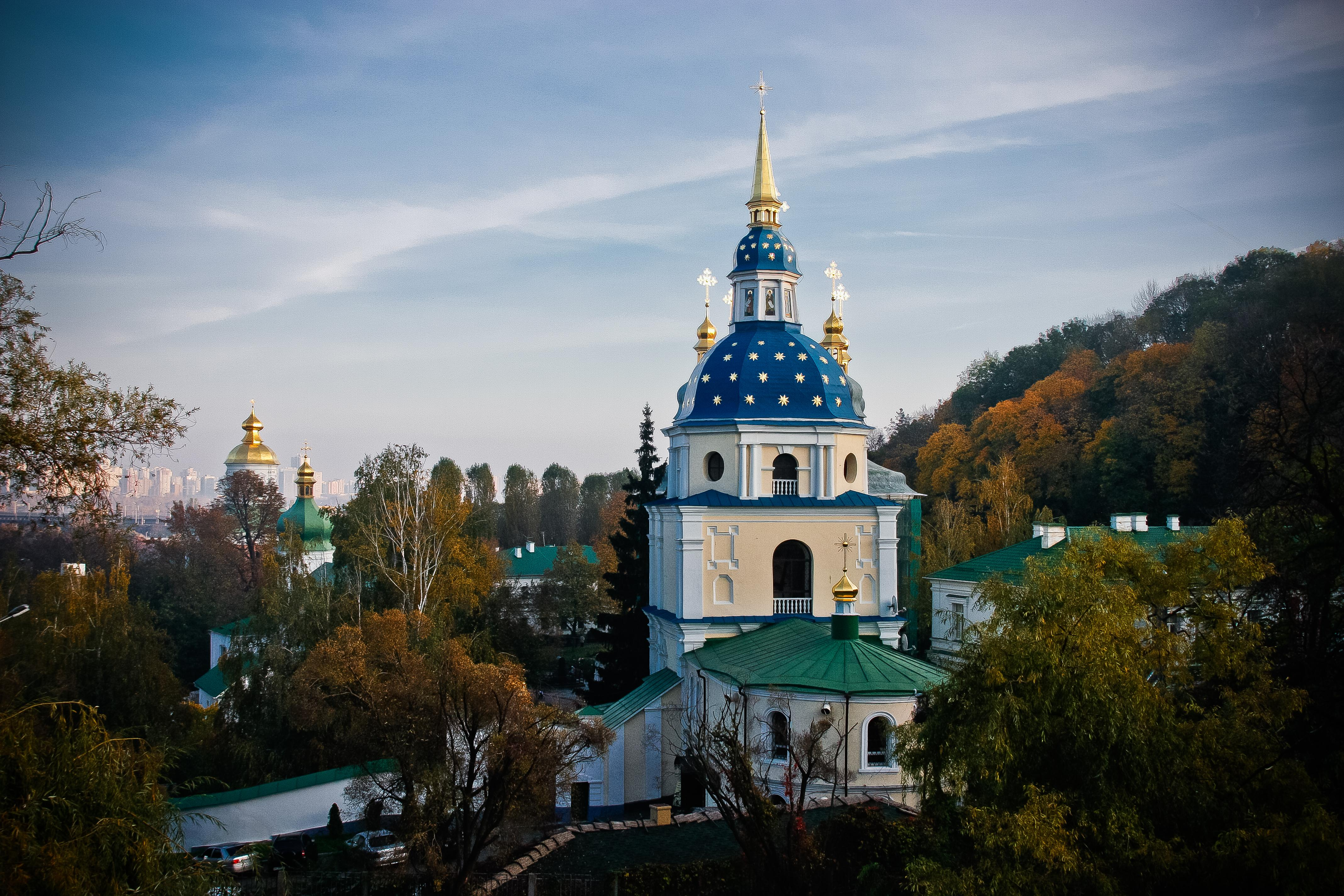
The Bell Tower

== Vydubychi Monastery in art and literature ==
- Drawing, Vydubytskyi Monastery in Kyiv (1844) by Taras Shevchenko. The work is located in the National Art Museum of Ukraine, Kyiv.
- Drawing, Vydubytskyi Monastery (1840s) by Mykhailo Sazhyn. The work is located in the National Art Museum of Ukraine, Kyiv.

== See also ==
- Trinity Monastery, Kyiv, a former filial monastery of Vydubychi
