= Kammerorchester Arpeggione =

- Also known as: Städtisches Kammerorchester Hohenems
- Origin: Hohenems, Vorarlberg, Austria
- Genres: Classical music
- Occupation: Chamber orchestra
- Years active: 1990–present

Kammerorchester Arpeggione (also known as the Städtisches Kammerorchester Hohenems) is an Austrian chamber orchestra based in Hohenems, Vorarlberg, founded in autumn 1990 by the Georgian-born violinist Nana Jashvili, who served as its artistic founder and principal soloist, together with the violist Irakli Gogibedaschwili as managing co-founder. Jashvili drew on her international network of conductors and soloists to shape the ensemble's programme.

== Founding ==
The orchestra was established in autumn 1990 in Hohenems, in the Austrian province of Vorarlberg.

Irakli Gogibedaschwili, a Georgian-born viola player and teacher based in Vorarlberg, served as co-founder and managing director (Initiator und Geschäftsführer) of the ensemble. Following Jashvili's departure in 1994, he took over full artistic and organisational direction of the orchestra and continues to serve as its Intendant.

The ensemble held the status of Städtisches Kammerorchester (municipal chamber orchestra) of Hohenems.

== Artistic direction and network ==
The orchestra's artistic profile was built on Jashvili's personal international network, established through decades of performing across the Soviet Union and Europe. Conductors who appeared with the ensemble in its early seasons included Uroš Lajovic, Alexander Rudin (Chefdirigent from 1993), Saulius Sondeckis, and Vladimir Ashkenazy.

Gari Petrenko, father of conductor Kirill Petrenko, was active in the early years of the orchestra, serving as its first concertmaster and conductor. Nana Jashvili had invited the Petrenko family to settle in Hohenems, where Kirill Petrenko — later chief conductor of the Berlin Philharmonic — began his musical career in Western Europe as a teenager. Artists from Jashvili's international network who appeared with the ensemble included the conductors Alexander Rudin and Saulius Sondeckis, and the soloists Liana Isakadze, Natalia Gutman, Daniel Müller-Schott, Vadim Repin, Lisa Batiashvili, and Kirill Petrenko.

A recurring series, Sterne von Morgen (Stars of Tomorrow), presented internationally promising young artists at the outset of their careers. Among those who performed in this context were Vadim Repin, Lisa Batiashvili (then performing as Elisabeth Batiaschwili), Konstantin Lifschitz, Alexander Kobrin, Elisso Gogibedaschwili, Sergei Nakariakov, Claudio Bohórquez, and Kirill Petrenko.

== Repertoire and concerts ==
Arpeggione presented chamber orchestra repertoire spanning the classical and romantic periods through twentieth-century music. Programmes included works by Joseph Haydn, Wolfgang Amadeus Mozart, Franz Schubert, Benjamin Britten, Dmitri Shostakovich, Alfred Schnittke, and Leonard Bernstein.

The orchestra performed regularly in Hohenems at the Rittersaal and Gräflicher Palast, and undertook international tours including concerts in Moscow and Saint Petersburg.

== Legacy ==
By its 35th anniversary in 2025, the orchestra had given more than 1,300 concerts. Arpeggione was among the earliest chamber orchestras in Vorarlberg to bring internationally prominent soloists and conductors to the region on a sustained basis.
