= Battle of Chashniki =

1812 battle during the French invasion of Russia

- Part of the French invasion of Russia
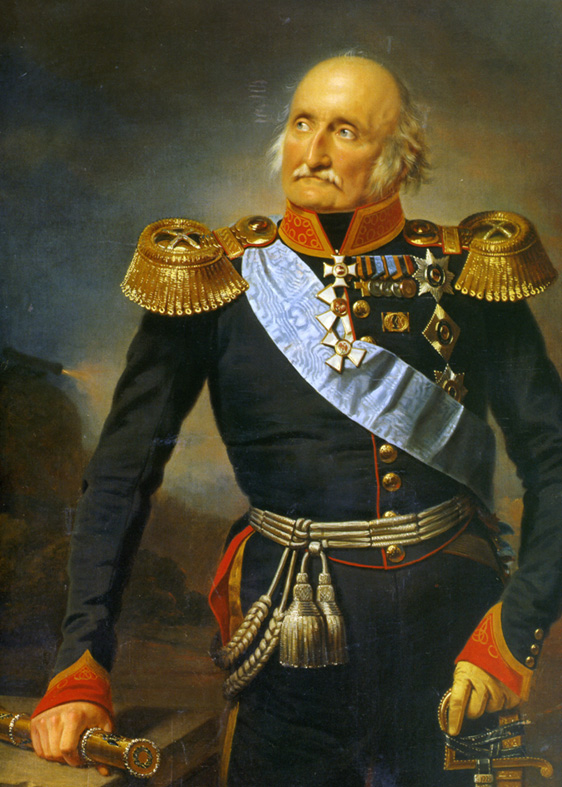
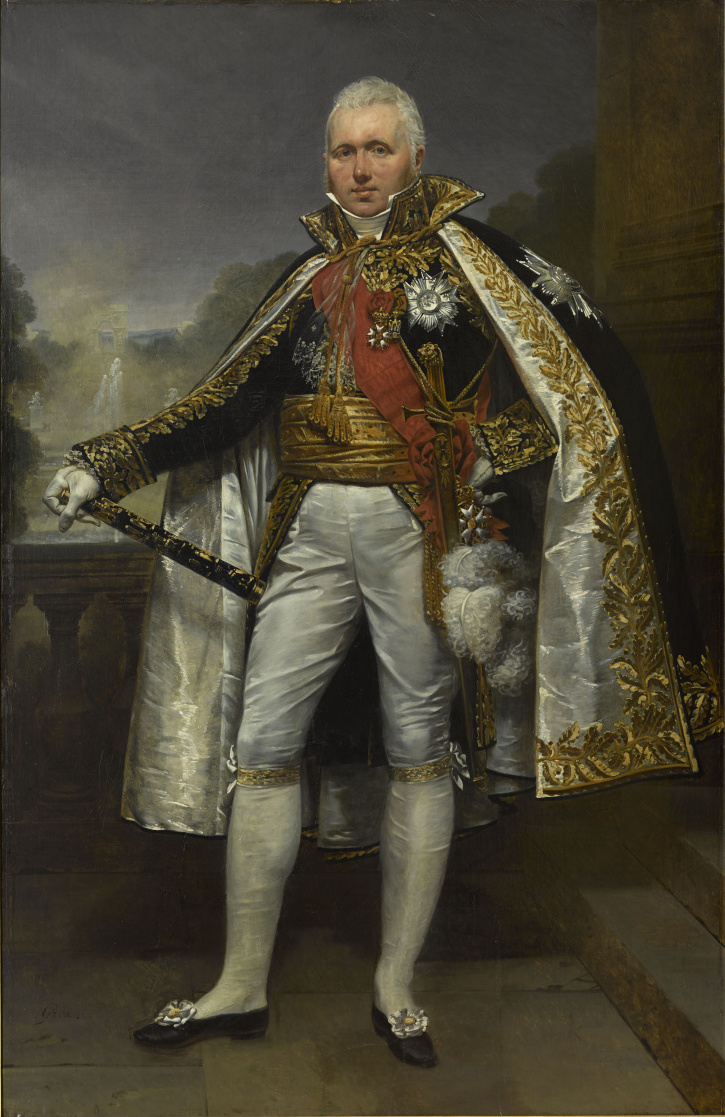
- Peter Wittgenstein (left) and Claude Victor (right)
| Date | 31 October 1812 |
| Location | Chashniki (Czasniki), Russian Empire 54°45′N 29°15′E |
| Result | Russian victory |

Belligerents
| Russian Empire | (First French Empire) French Empire |

Commanders and leaders
| (Russian Empire) Peter Wittgenstein (Russian Empire) Lev Yashvil | (First French Empire) Claude Victor |

Strength
| 30,000, of whom 11,000 were involved | 36,000, of whom 10,000 to 18,000 were involved |

Casualties and losses
| 400 | 1,200 |

French invasion of Russia
current battle
Prussian corps
Napoleon
Austrian corps

The Battle of Chashniki (Russian: Бой под Чашниками; Belarusian: Бой пад Чашнікамі; Lithuanian: Čašnikų mūšis), sometimes also called the Battle of Czasniki (from the Polish spelling – Polish: Czaśniki), was fought during Napoleon's invasion of Russia, on 31 October 1812, between Russian forces under General Wittgenstein, and the French Army, commanded by Marshal Victor. This battle was a failed effort by the French to reestablish their northern "Dvina Line", which had crumbled as a result of Wittgenstein's victory at the second battle of Polotsk just two weeks earlier.

== Background ==
Upon learning of the French defeat at Polotsk, Victor, the commander of the French IX corps which Napoleon had kept in reserve at Smolensk, marched northeast with 22,000 troops to restore the Dvina Line. At Chashniki, on the Ulla River, he united with elements of the II Corps, which was retreating from Polotsk. The combined II and IX corps put 36,000 troops at Victor's disposal.

Wittgenstein, after leaving 9,000 soldiers to garrison territory captured as a result of his victory at Polotsk, marched south to Chashniki with 30,000 troops to deal with Victor.

== Action ==
The combat at Chashniki was conducted chiefly by Wittgenstein's advance guard, 11,000 troops led by General Yashvil, and the II Corps on the French side.

The battle began with the Russians attacking the II Corps, which occupied a position in advance of the rest of Victor's troops. In the ensuing combat the Russians drove the French back toward Victor's rearward line. Upon encountering Victor's main position, Wittgenstein ordered Yashvil to halt, and then commenced an artillery bombardment against the French. Victor, apparently unnerved by Yashvil's successful advance, decided against continuing the battle, and retreated to Senno, 25 miles (40 km) to the east. The Russians did not pursue.

French casualties in this battle were 1,200 troops, as opposed to 400 lost by the Russians.

== Consequences ==
Although the Russian victory at Chashniki was indecisive, its outcome was highly unfavorable to Napoleon for several reasons.

First, Victor's defeat amounted to a failure to reestablish the Dvina Line, which was his overriding objective. Second, Victor's new position at Senno was only 30 miles (48 km) from Napoleon's intended line of retreat from Moscow, putting the Grande Armée within Wittgenstein's attacking range. Further, Wittgenstein's success increased the possibility that he could unite his command with the armies of Pavel Chichagov and Kutuzov, trapping the Grande Armée between three separate Russian forces.

Also, as a result of his victories at Polotsk and Chashniki, Wittgenstein dispatched a force under General Harpe to capture the massive French supply depot at Vitebsk. On 7 November, after a short combat, the French garrison at Vitebsk surrendered to Harpe, and huge caches of foodstuffs and war material fell into Russian hands.

The fall of Vitebsk was a severe blow to Napoleon because he had planned to quarter his battered Grande Armée there for the winter. Napoleon's plan to combine his main army with Victor's force at Vitebsk, where they would reequip themselves before beginning the campaign anew the following spring, was now broken.

Upon learning of the Russian victory at Chashniki, Napoleon ordered Victor to immediately attack Wittgenstein again and recapture Polotsk. This led to yet another French defeat, the Battle of Smoliani, on 14 November 1812.

== See also ==
- List of battles of the French invasion of Russia

== Notes ==
| Preceded by Battle of Maloyaroslavets | Napoleonic Wars; Battle of Chashniki | Succeeded by Battle of Vyazma |
