= Lev Mikhailovich Yashvil =

General of the Imperial Russian Army

Prince Lev Mikhailovich Yashvil
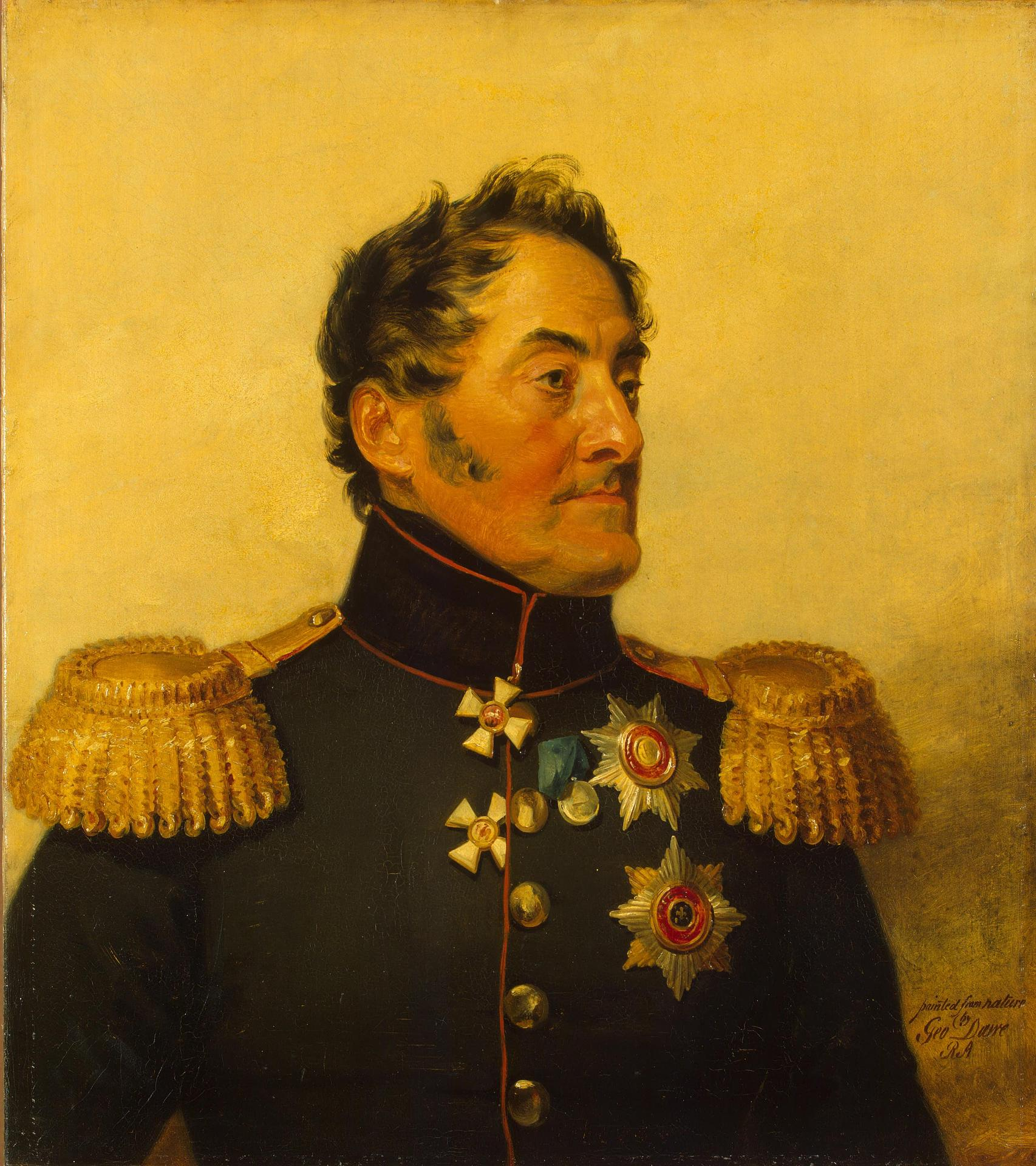
- Portrait by George Dawe
- Born: Levan Mikheilis dze Iashvili; August 17, 1772
- Died: April 19, 1836 (aged 63); Kiev, Russian Empire
- Military career
- Allegiance: Russian Empire
- Branch: Imperial Russian Army: Artillery & Army
- Service years: 1786-1836
- Rank: General of the Artillery
- Commands: Advanceguard at Chashniki (1812); Chief of Artillery of the Russian army (1813 - 1814); Chief of Artillery of the First Western Army (1819 - 1832)
- Conflicts: Russo-Turkish War (1787–1792); Battle of Kinburn; Siege of Ochakov; Polish–Russian War of 1792; Kościuszko Uprising; Battle of Praga; Napoleonic Wars; War of the Fourth Coalition; Battle of Heilsberg; Battle of Eylau; Battle of Guttstadt-Deppen; French invasion of Russia; Battle of Chashniki; Battle of Klyastitsy; War of the Sixth Coalition; Battle of Lützen; Battle of Bautzen; Battle of Reims; November Uprising
- Awards: Weapons:

Signature
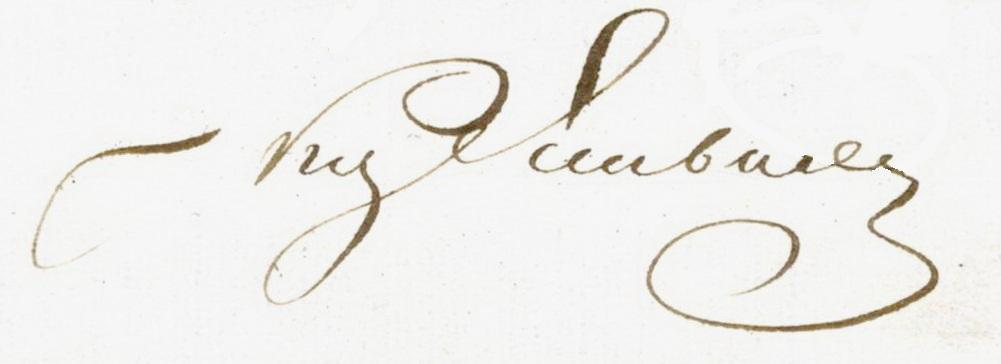

Prince Lev Mikhailovich Yashvil (Russian: Лев Михайлович Яшвиль), also known as Levan Mikheilis dze Iashvili (Georgian: ლევან მიხეილის ძე იაშვილი) (1772 - April 19, 1836) was a Georgian nobleman and a general of the Imperial Russian Army. Yashvil took part in a number of significant military campaigns, including during the French invasion of Russia, the Russo-Turkish War (1787–1792) and the Kościuszko Uprising.

== Family ==
Yashvil was born to an émigré Georgian noble family of Iashvili. He had an older brother Vladimir, who would also rise to the rank of a General and become personally involved in the assassination of Emperor Paul I of Russia.

== Military career ==
=== Wars with Turkey and Poland ===
Yashvil graduated from the cadet corps as an artillery officer in 1786 and took part in the Russo-Turkish War (1787–1792), earning the rank of lieutenant after the success at Kinburn and Ochakov.

Following the peace treaty Yashvil deployed to Poland for the Polish campaign of 1794, where he played a decisive role in initial victories that culminated in the unsuccessful Siege of Warsaw. His deeds during battle and for the capture of the suburb of Praga and eventually the city itself (Warsaw), Yashvil was awarded with the orders of Saint Vladimir 2nd and Saint George 4th degree.

From 1794 to 1799 Yashvil was part of the Guard Horse Artillery. He was promoted to captain in 1799 and colonel the following year and from 1801 to 1806 was transferred to several Guard battalions of the artillery. In that period he took upon himself to restore and modernise the Russian artillery.

=== Napoleonic wars ===
With the Fourth Coalition declaring war against Napoleonic France in 1805, colonel Yashvil was assigned to Austria where he took part in several decisive battles against Napoleon. The battles of Heilsberg, Eylau and Guttstatd in particular earned him another Order of St. George, 3rd degree this time, two swords of the award Gold Sword for Bravery and one of the two highest Prussian military honors Pour le Mérite. In addition he was declared the most valuable asset of the campaign.

In 1808 Yashvil was promoted to major general. During Napoleon's invasion of Russia in 1812, he first commanded the 4th artillery brigade under field marshal Wittgenstein and for his conducts at the battle of Klyastitsy and Battle of Chashniki he received the rank of lieutenant-general. Following the French retreat from Russia, Yashvil was appointed commander of the Russian artillery in 1813. For his participation in the Prussian and Saxony campaigns, he received several more decorations, including the second highest Prussian award, the Order of the Red Eagle.

During a field inspection of the army in Champagne, Russian regent Alexander I awarded general Yashvil with the Order of Saint Vladimir 1st degree, for the brilliant state of the imperial artillery. Throughout his service he maintained good and favourable relations with the tsar.

=== Later years ===
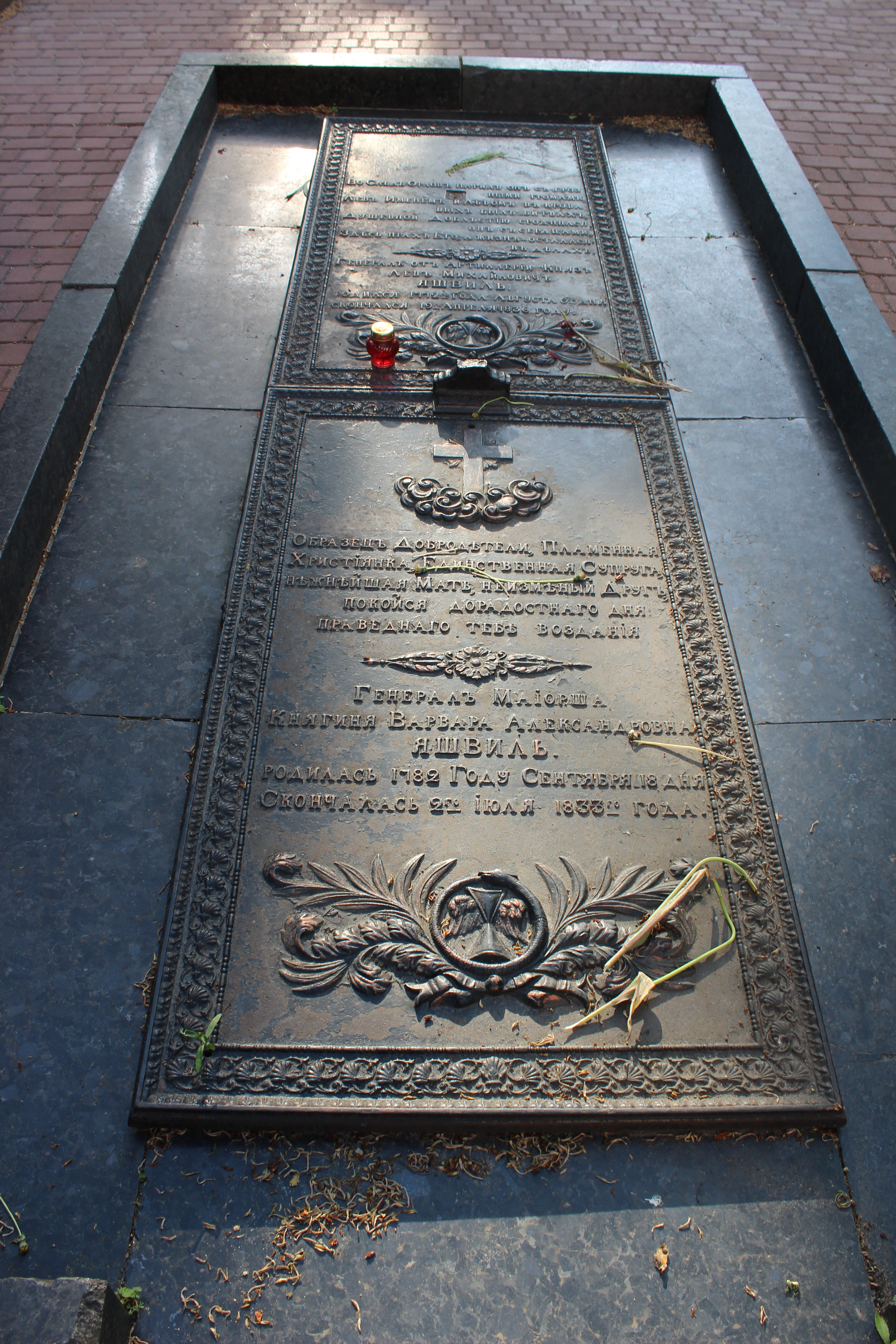
Grave of General Yashvil

After the war with the French and his return to Russia, Yashvil served as the commander of artillery of the First Western Army, from 1816 until his retirement in 1833. In 1819 he was promoted to General of the Artillery. Prior to that, he took part in suppressing the 1830-31 November Uprising in Poland. After serious health issues he then requested retirement from service in 1833. His last award was the highest Russian honor, the Order of St. Andrew. Lev Yashvil would die three years later in Kiev. The general was buried at the Vydubychi Monastery.

== Awards ==
Order of St. Andrew
Order of Saint Alexander Nevsky
Pour le Mérite
Order of the Red Eagle
Two times Order of Saint Vladimir (1st and 2nd Grade)
Two times Order of St. George (3rd and 4th Grade)
Order of Saint Anna (1st Grade)
Order of Saint John
Two times Gold Sword for Bravery

== See also ==
- Pyotr Bagration
- Roman Bagration
- Ivan Zhevakhov
- List of Georgians
