= Iashvili (family) =

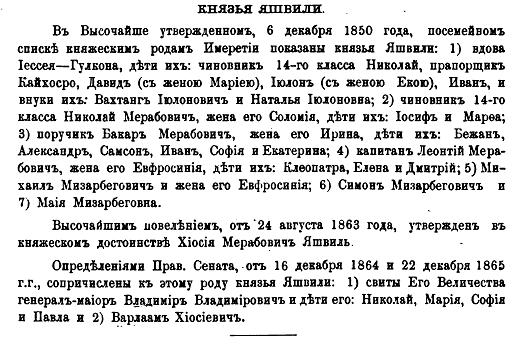
Register of Princes Iashvili in Russian nobility book (1892)

The House of Iashvili (Georgian: იაშვილი) was a Georgian noble family known in Imereti (west Georgia) from the fifteenth century.

== History ==
In 1724, one of the members of this family followed the Georgian king Vakhtang VI in his emigration to the Russian Empire, giving rise to a Russian branch known as Yashvil (Яшвиль). The Georgian line was received among the princely houses of the Russian Empire in 1850.

== Notable members ==
- Lev Mikhailovich Yashvil (1772–1836), Russian general of artillery
- Vladimir Mikhailovich Yashvil (1764–1815), Major General
- Vladimir Vladimirovich Yashvil (1815–1864), Major General
- Lev Vladimirovich Yashvil (1859–1917), Governor of Siberia.

== See also ==
- Iashvili
