= Vladimir Betz =

Anatomist and histologist from the Russian Empire (1834–1894)

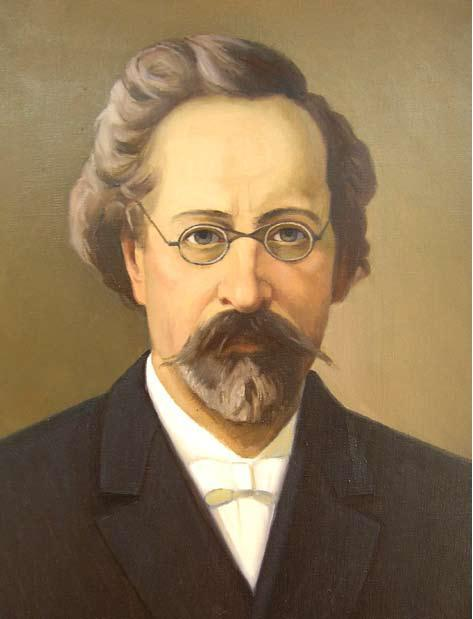
- Born: 26 April [O.S. 14 April] 1834; Tatarovshchina, Ostyorsky Uyezd, Chernigov Governorate, Russian Empire
- Died: October 12, 1894 (aged 60); Kiev, Kiev Governorate, Russian Empire
- Education: Saint Vladimir University of Kiev
- Known for: Discovery of Betz cells Pioneering cytoarchitectonics Discovery of the chromaffin reaction
- Awards: Medals for brain tissue samples at the All-Russian Manufacturing Exhibition (1870) and the Vienna World Exposition (1873)
- Scientific career
- Fields: Anatomy, histology, neuroscience, psychiatry

Vladimir Alekseyevich Betz (Note: Russian: Владимир Алексеевич Бец, romanized: Vladimir Alekseyevich Bets; Ukrainian: Володимир Олексійович Бец, romanized: Volodymyr Oleksiyovych Bets) (26 April [O.S. 14 April] 1834 – 12 October [O.S. 30 September] 1894) was a prominent anatomist, histologist, and psychiatrist of the Russian Empire. Born in modern-day Ukraine, he served as a professor at Saint Vladimir University of Kiev and is most famous for the discovery of giant pyramidal neurons in the primary motor cortex, now known as Betz cells.

== Biography ==
Vladimir Betz was born into a noble family of Ukrainian Cossack descent in the small village of Tatarovshchina, near the town of Oster. He began his primary education in Nizhyn (Nezhin), and later attended the 2nd Kiev Gymnasium, where he graduated in 1853. In 1860, he completed the Kiev University course in the Faculty of Medicine, earning his doctor's degree with honors. Subsequently, he served as an assistant prosector in the anatomy department under Professor Alexander Walter, and later worked as a dissector.

From May 1861 to September 1862, Betz was sent abroad to study in Germany and Austria, where he attended lectures by prominent European scientists, including Ernst Brücke, Carl Ludwig, Robert Bunsen, Albert von Kölliker, Gustav Kirchhoff and Hermann von Helmholtz. He defended his doctoral dissertation, On Blood Circulation in the Liver, in 1863.

From 1864 to 1867, he taught human anatomy at the natural sciences faculty and histology at the medical faculty, while also delivering special courses on the anatomy of the nervous system and analytical chemistry. In 1868, he was confirmed as an extraordinary professor, and in 1870 as an ordinary professor in the department of anatomy.

Betz took an active part in the public and medical life of Kiev. He was one of the founders of the Kiev Natural Research Society. He never separated theoretical science from clinical practice; for 25 years, he served as a consultant on nervous diseases and psychiatry at the Kiev Kirillov Hospital (now the Psychiatric Hospital named after Academician I. P. Pavlov). He also worked pro bono at a free clinic established by the Society of Kiev Physicians.

Betz was deeply interested in Ukrainian history. In 1883, together with prominent historian Volodymyr Antonovych, he published the historical work Historical Figures of Southwestern Russia. The book featured biographies of Ukrainian Hetmans based on the private collection of Vasyl Tarnovsky. This publication caused severe backlash from the imperial administration; Betz was labeled politically "unreliable," and the book was perceived by government circles in the Russian Empire as a manifestation of Ukrainian separatism and a protest against the policy of autocracy. Under mounting pressure from the leadership, Professor Betz was forced to leave his post as head of the anatomy department at Saint Vladimir University and resigned in 1890. Until the end of his days, he worked as the chief physician of the South-Western Railway.

== Scientific activity ==
Throughout his career, Betz authored approximately 50 scientific papers. His main direction of scientific research was the anatomy and histology of the central nervous system. In 1874, Betz described giant pyramidal neurons of the primary motor cortex of the brain, which later received the eponymous name Betz cells.

His work was revolutionary in linking cortical cytoarchitectonics with physiological function. Betz was the first to recognize that the cortex was functionally organized into distinct motor and sensory areas based on microscopic evidence, predating the mapping work of Korbinian Brodmann. He systematically identified 11 different types of cerebral cortex, pushing back against the pseudoscientific notions of phrenology by proving that skull shape does not determine cognitive abilities.

To achieve this, Betz revolutionized the methods of cell fixation and staining (particularly with carmine). He invented an original microtome (a "histological guillotine") that allowed him to cut remarkably large yet extremely thin slices of brain tissue. To properly document his findings, Betz mastered photography and even bought printing presses with his own funds to publish his Atlas of the Human Brain.

In addition to his neurological discoveries, Betz made a foundational contribution to endocrinology. He discovered the chromaffin reaction of the adrenal medulla, noting that these cells stain brown when treated with chromic acid. This was a crucial step in identifying catecholamine-secreting cells. He also studied the embryogenesis of bone tissue and published a fundamental study, Morphology of Osteogenesis, in 1887.

As the Director of the Anatomical Theater in Kiev, Betz massively expanded its museum. He collected over 8,900 preparations of the human and animal brain, 108 brain casts, and a large anthropological collection of skulls. He also donated hundreds of unique books to the museum's library.

== The brain collection and legacy ==
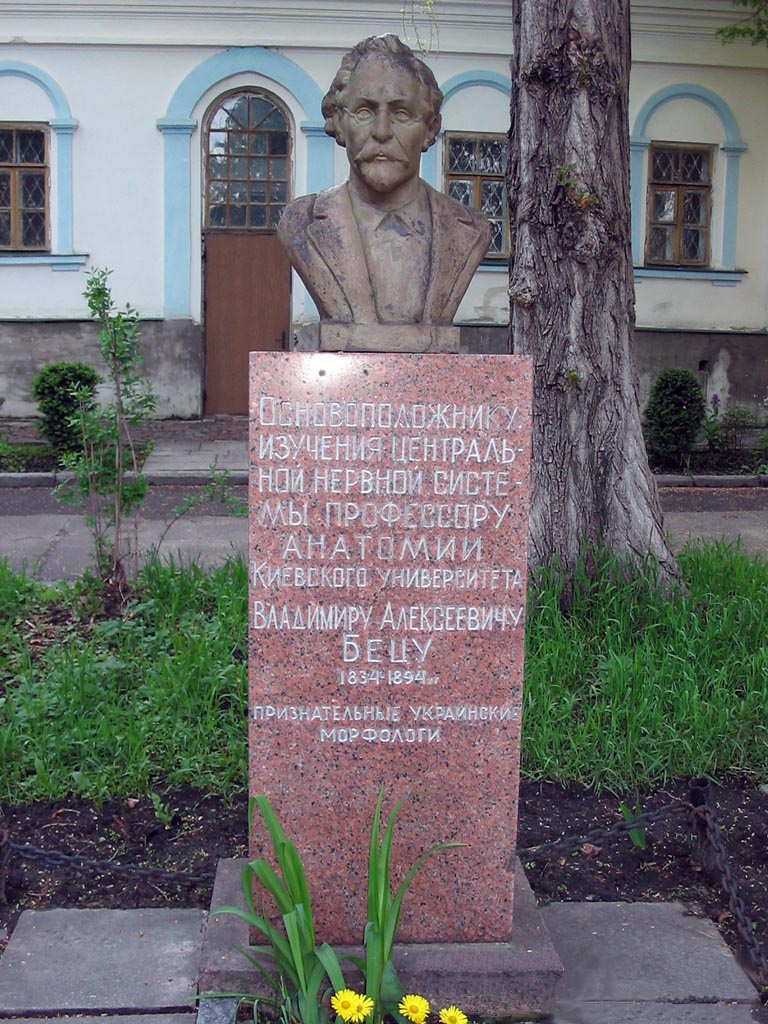
Vladimir Betz headstone at the Vydubychi Monastery, Kyiv, Ukraine. The inscription reads: "To the initiator of studies of the Central Nervous System, the professor of anatomy of the Kyiv University, Vladimir Alekseyevich Betz. 1834-1894. Grateful Ukrainian morphologists."

Betz was considered an unsurpassed master of making anatomical preparations under the microscope. For his unique collection of brain preparations—which was exhibited in St. Petersburg in 1870—he was awarded a silver medal. Later, at the Vienna World Exposition of 1873, his collection was awarded the highest honor, the Medal of Progress.

The famous Austrian anatomist Josef Hyrtl noted: "No anatomist has advanced the knowledge of the structure of the brain as much as Professor Betz did." The collection was valued at an enormous sum of 7,000 Austrian guilders. According to historical accounts, the German Anatomical Society offered to buy the preparations for a price equal to the collection's exact weight in pure gold. Betz categorically refused the lucrative offers, declaring that his work belonged to his homeland, and donated the entire collection to Kiev University for free.

Betz died on October 12, 1894, and was buried near the Vydubychi Monastery in Kiev. Decades later, his burial site was almost destroyed by local officials who claimed the professor was "not distinguished by any merits" to the state. However, his grave was located and saved by a group of Ukrainian doctors and medical historians. They collected funds and erected a bust on a granite pedestal with the inscription: "To the initiator of studies of the Central Nervous System, the professor of anatomy of the Kyiv University, Vladimir Alekseyevich Betz. 1834–1894. Grateful Ukrainian morphologists."

== Essays ==
- On Blood Circulation in the Liver (dissertation for the degree of Doctor of Medicine, Kiev, 1863)
- A New Method for Studying the Human Central Nervous System (Notes of the Kiev Society of Naturalists, 1870; and Archiv von Max Schultze, 1870)
- On the Grouping of Convolutions of the Human Brain (Notes of the Kiev Society of Naturalists, 1871)
- Das Gesetz der Vertheilung der Gyri und Sulci der menschlichen Gehirnoberfläche (Sitzber. der Wiener Psychiatren)
- Two Centers in the Human Cerebral Cortex (Moscow Medical Bulletin, 1875)
- Historical Figures of South-Western Russia (Kiev, 1883, together with Professor V. B. Antonovich)
- Anatomy of the Surface of the Human Brain, with an Atlas and 86 Tables (University News, 1883)
- Morphology of Osteogenesis (1887)
