= Chrysler (disambiguation) =

Chrysler is the name of a major American automobile manufacturer officially known as Stellantis North America, and the Chrysler (brand) operated by the same company.

Chrysler or Crysler may also refer to:

== Automotive ==
- Chrysler Australia, former auto manufacturer and importer
- Chrysler Canada, Chrysler's Canadian subsidiary since 1925
- Chrysler Europe (1967–1979), European division of the former Chrysler Group
- DaimlerChrysler, the former parent company of Daimler-Benz, Created by the 1998 merger of Daimler-Benz and Chrysler
- Fiat Chrysler Automobiles, the former parent company of FCA Italy (Fiat) and FCA USA (Chrysler), now Stellantis

== Places ==
- Chrysler Building, a skyscraper in New York City, US
- Crysler, a community in North Stormont, Ontario, Canada
- Chrysler Museum of Art, an art museum in Norfolk, Virginia, US

== People ==
- Dick Chrysler (born 1942), former member of the United States House of Representatives
- Morgan Henry Chrysler (1822–1890), American Civil War general
- Walter P. Chrysler (1875–1940), founder of the Chrysler Corporation
- Walter P. Chrysler Jr. (1909-1988), American art collector

== Other uses ==
- Battle of Crysler's Farm, fought on 11 November 1813, during the Anglo-American War of 1812

== See also ==
- Kreisler, a surname
