= Maurice Fitzgerald (rugby union) =

English rugby union player

- Born: Maurice George Hollis FitzGerald; 14 February 1976 (age 50) The Hague, The Netherlands
- School: Ampleforth College
- University: Durham University

Rugby union career
- Position: Tighthead Prop
Senior career
Years	Team	Apps	(Points)
1998–1999	Richmond F.C.	3	(0)
1999–2004	Biarritz Olympique	35	(0)
2004–2005	Harlequins	2	(0)
International career
Years	Team	Apps	(Points)
2003	England A	?	(?)

Maurice George Hollis FitzGerald (born 14 February 1976), known professionally as Maurice Fitzgerald, is an English former rugby union player.

Fitzgerald, who spent the majority of his club career in France, was part of the championship winning Biarritz side of the 2001/02 season.

== Biography ==
=== Personal ===
Born in The Hague, Fitzgerald attended Ampleforth College and graduated from Durham University in 1998 with a degree in Modern Languages.

=== Career ===
Fitzgerald joined Richmond F.C. following university. In 1999 the club went into administration; Fitzgerald moved to Biarritz, where he had previously spent a year abroad as a student.

In 2003 Fitzgerald was called up to England A for the first time after strong performances in the Heineken Cup and French Championship. He signed for Harlequins for the 2004/05 season and made his debut as a substitute on 27 September 2004 against Worcester, but featured in only a handful of league and cup matches during his final year as a professional.
