= Dimitri Yachvili =

France international rugby union player (born 1980)

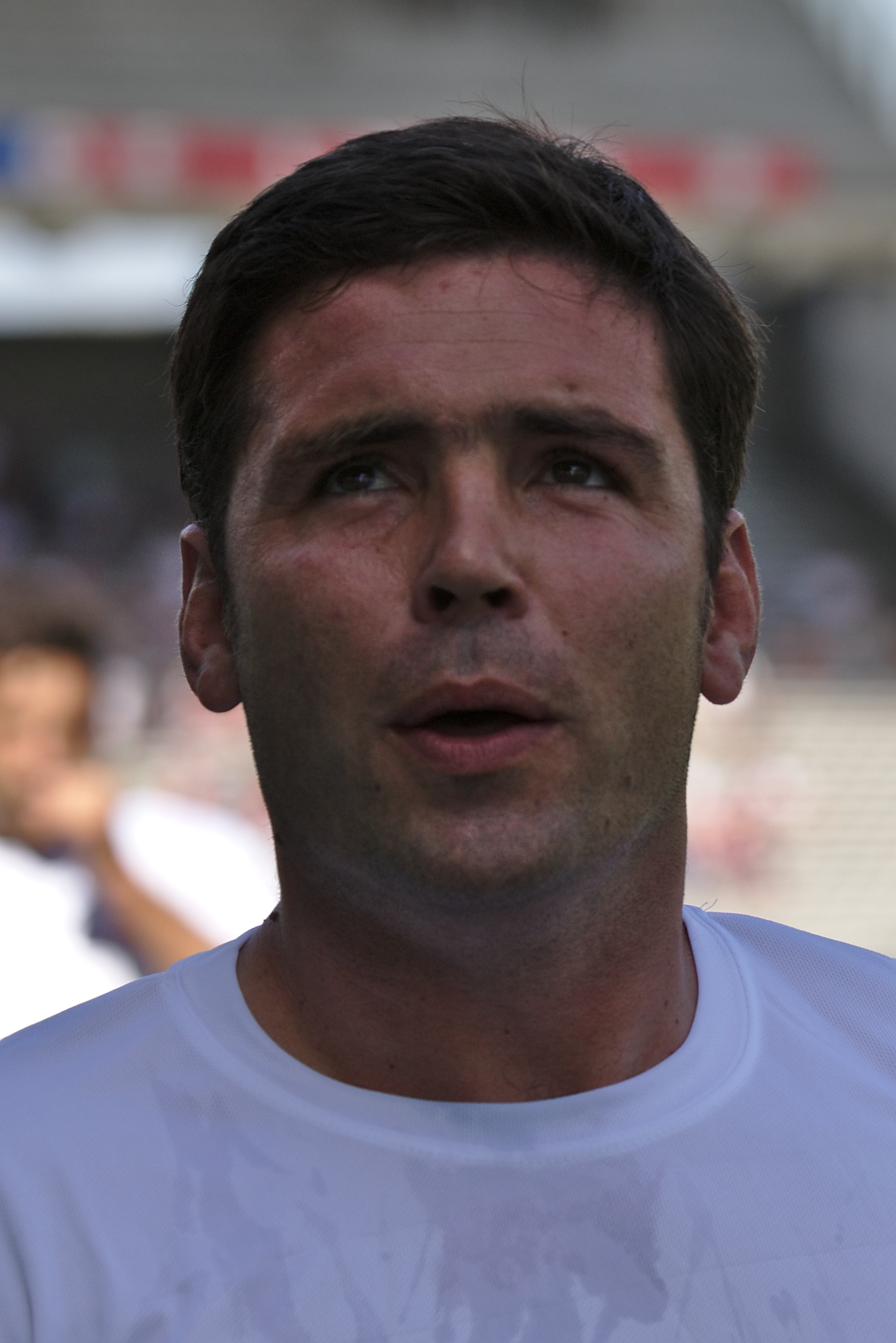
- Yachvili in 2015
- Born: Dimitri Yachvili Markarian; 19 September 1980 (age 46) Brive-la-Gaillarde, France
- Height: 1.82 m (6 ft 0 in)
- Weight: 84 kg (13 st 3 lb; 185 lb)

Rugby union career
- Position: Scrum-half
Senior career
Years	Team	Apps	(Points)
1998–1999	Brive		
1990–2001	Paris UC		
2001–2002	Gloucester		
2002–2014	Biarritz	289	(3053)
International career
Years	Team	Apps	(Points)
2002–2012	France	60	(373)

Dimitri Yachvili Markarian (born 19 September 1980) is a French former rugby union footballer who played as a scrum-half for Biarritz and France. He played for France from 2002 to 2012, earning 61 caps and scoring 373 points. With them he played in the final of the 2011 World Cup losing to New Zealand and won two Grand Slams in 2004 and 2010. In club rugby, he won a European Cup in 2012 and played in two European Cup finals in 2006 and 2010 with Biarritz. With this club, he also won two French championship titles in 2005 and 2006. With his previous club, Gloucester, he was champion of England in 2002. After the end of his playing career, he became a rugby consultant, a career he began while still a player.

== Personal life ==
Of Georgian and Armenian descent, his father Michel Yachvili was a French international before him. His paternal grandfather Chalva (Charles) was a Georgian soldier in the Soviet Army during WWII who was taken prisoner by the Wehrmacht in France, subsequently escaping to participate in the French Resistance in the province of Limousin, where he settled after hostilities. His maternal grandfather, Alexandre Markarian, who played as hooker for Brive in the 1950s, was an Armenian genocide survivor. Dimitri's brother Grégoire chose to play for the Georgian national team.

== Career ==
He began his club career at Gloucester Rugby where he was a replacement in the 2002 Zurich Premiership final (the year before winning the play-offs constituted winning the English title) in which Gloucester defeated Bristol Rugby.

Yachvili made his international debut in November 2002 in a 35–3 victory against Canada.

After the retirement of Fabien Galthié, Yachvili was frequently part of the French starting 15.

During the 2005 Six Nations Championship he gained his position as the first choice scrum-half for the France national team. Yachvili broke his kicking tee the evening before the match against England at Twickenham, which forced Serge Betsen to call upon his former Biarritz teammate Maurice Fitzgerald to hunt for a tee locally and deliver it to the French team hotel. He also captained the France national team, surrendering the captaincy permanently for the 2005 summer tour to South Africa, which he missed through injury.

He was considered the number two scrum-half behind Jean-Baptiste Élissalde in the French team who retired in May 2010. He was second to Morgan Parra in the national selection as of the 2009 Six Nations. He was omitted from the squad for the 2007 World Cup.

He lost his second Heineken Cup final to Stade Toulousain in May 2010. He was also part of the losing side in the 2006 final to Munster at Cardiff's Millennium Stadium.

Yachvili was a member of the French team that finished as the runner-up to hosts New Zealand in the 2011 Rugby World Cup final.

Following an injury sustained in the World Cup, his club appearances were limited the subsequent season. Nevertheless his presence in the squad was then very important: over the Top 14 season, Biarritz won 71.5% of their matches when Yachvili was present, against 12.5% when he was absent.

The 2013-2014 season was complicated for Olympic Biarritz, who with only five wins and a total of 30 points saw themselves demoted to Pro D2. On April 10, 2014, Dimitri Yachvili announced that he was ending his career, despite one year remaining on his contract. After twelve seasons spent with Olympic Biarritz, Yachvili expressed the mental and physical fatigue he had to face after the last trying years.

Following his retirement, he became a rugby consultant, also commentating on matches for French television. He later joined in the management of the amateur team at Biarritz.
