= Kreisler =

Kreisler is a surname. Notable people with the surname include:

- Fritz Kreisler, Austria-born American violinist and composer
- Georg Kreisler, Austrian-American German-language cabarettist
- Harry Kreisler, American historian

Fictional characters:

- Johannes Kreisler, character from various novels by E.T.A. Hoffmann

== See also ==
- Kreisleriana
- Chrysler (disambiguation)
