= Benjamin Izmajlov =

Slovene violinist, composer, conductor and producer

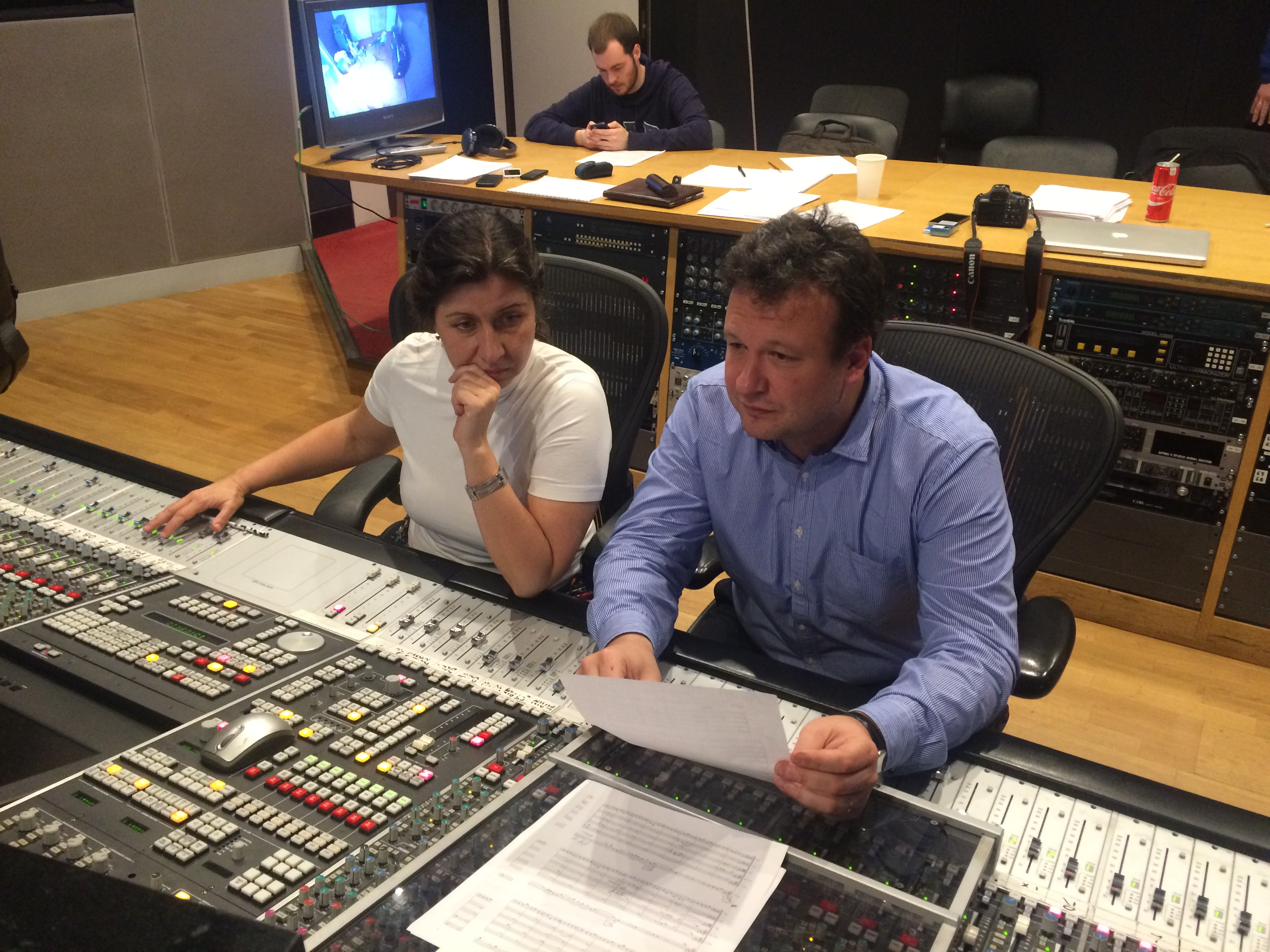
Benjamin Izmajlov at Mosfilm Studios, May 2016

Benjamin Izmajlov (born September 17, 1974) is a Slovene violinist, composer, conductor and producer.

== Education ==
Benjamin Izmajlov was born in Rijeka, Croatia, on 17 September 1974 to a Croatian mother and Slovene/Russian father. When he was two months old, the family moved to Izola, a city on the Adriatic coast in Slovenia. He began to play the violin at the age of six. After completing the Primary Music School in Koper, he went on to study at the Secondary Music School in Ljubljana in the class of the teacher Volodja Balžalorsky. During his teenage years, he studied with several famous Russian violin teachers (G. Zhislin, E. Gilels, P. Vernikov, E. Tschugaeva). Later he graduated and obtained his master's degree from State Conservatory named after P.I. Tchaikovsky in Moscow. (class of Marina Yashvili).

Benjamin Izmajlov is fluent in English, Italian, Russian, German, Croatian and his native Slovene.

== Professional career ==
Benjamin Izmajlov has given many concerts across Europe, chamber and with various orchestras. He is Guest Soloist of the Moscow Philharmonics as well as a member of the Ensemble of Soloists of the Moscow Philharmonics “Madrigal” and has recorded an album Libre Vermell with them.

He is a composer of his own songs and arranger of songs of different genres (classical, traditional, popular). He regularly appears as a symphonic orchestra conductor on concerts with his wife, Marie-Anne Izmajlov.

He is also a violin teacher at international masterclasses and jury member at international competitions. He is the director and founder of the International Academy Giuseppe Tartini, the Slovenian Summer Academy of Music and the Slovenian Diplomatic Concert.

He has cooperated with many world known musicians: Sergey Skripka, Alexander Tchaikovsky, Nataliya Gutman, Marina Yashvili, Alviya Vandisheva, Moshe Aron Epstein, Alexander Kagan, Alexander Buzlov, Roman Simović, Giorgio Croci, Corrado Ruzza, Renato Chicco, Gokhan Aybulus, Daria Tchaikovskaya, Bernarda Fink, Marcos Fink, Janez Lotrič, Ljuba Kazarnovskaya, Kerry Ellis, Francesco Renga...

== Notable producing and orchestrating ==
- Slavic Soul / Slovanska duša (album 2007)
- Slovene Heart / Slovensko srce (album 2008)
- Songs of My Home / Pesmi mojih krajev (album 2016)
- Russian Collection / Ruska kolekcija (album 2018)
- Madrigal Ensamble (European tour 2014)
- The Slavic Soul (world tour 2010–present)

== Private life ==
Benjamin Izmajlov is married to the Slovene mezzo-soprano Marie-Anne Izmajlov. They have three daughters, Izabela, Karolina and Lili-Sophie. The family lives in Austria.
