= Gia Jashvili =

Georgian-born Austrian violinist

Gia Jashvili (გია იაშვილი) is a Georgian-born Austrian violinist, known for combining the expressive tradition of the Russian violin school with the stylistic refinement of the Central European tradition. His career has encompassed work as a soloist, concertmaster, conductor, chamber musician, and artistic director across Europe, Asia, and North America.

== Early life and education ==
Jashvili was born in Tbilisi into a Georgian musical family with deep roots in the Russian violin tradition. He received his earliest training from his mother, Nana Jashvili, a professor at the Folkwang University of the Arts in Essen and a former student of Leonid Kogan, his grandfather Professor Luarsab Jashvili, and his aunt, Marine Yashvili, a long-serving professor at the Moscow Conservatory. One of his first teachers was Elena Sverdlova (Russian: Елена Свердлова; German transliteration: Elena Swerdlowa).

Following the liberalisation of Soviet-era restrictions on international artistic activity, Nana Jashvili — whose career in the West had been blocked under the Soviet system — moved to Austria in 1989 at the invitation of Claudio Abbado. Through Abbado's personal advocacy, mother and son were granted Austrian citizenship under a special government programme providing expedited citizenship to individuals of exceptional cultural value whose presence is considered to be in the national interest.

He subsequently studied with Zakhar Bron — whose students include Vadim Repin and Maxim Vengerov — at the Cologne University of Music, where his classmates included Daishin Kashimoto and Pietari Inkinen. He continued his studies with Gerhard Schulz of the Alban Berg Quartet at the University of Music and Performing Arts Vienna. Over more than a decade he was also mentored by Ivry Gitlis, whose own teachers included Carl Flesch and George Enescu.

== Performance career ==
Jashvili has performed at major international venues including Suntory Hall in Tokyo, Carnegie Hall in New York, the Sydney Opera House, the Vienna Musikverein, and the Berlin Philharmonie. He has worked with conductors including Claudio Abbado, Lorin Maazel, Zubin Mehta, Mariss Jansons, Riccardo Muti, Bernard Haitink, and Sir Simon Rattle.

In February 2000, Jashvili performed the Tchaikovsky Violin Concerto as soloist at major German concert halls including the Kölner Philharmonie, the Tonhalle Düsseldorf, and the Laeiszhalle in Hamburg.

In 2005, Jashvili performed Mozart's Violin Concerto No. 5 in A major (KV 219) as soloist with the Internationale Junge Orchesterakademie, the festival orchestra of the Bayreuther Osterfestival, under conductor Miguel Ángel Gómez Martínez, on a tour to Bayreuth, Selb, Weiden, Leipzig, and Bielefeld.

In 2006, Lorin Maazel appointed Jashvili as one of the concertmasters of the Orquestra de la Comunitat Valenciana at the newly established Palau de les Arts Reina Sofía in Valencia. During his tenure (2006–2011) he participated in Zubin Mehta's complete staging of Wagner's Ring Cycle (2007–2009), including productions of Die Walküre with Plácido Domingo.

From 2011, Jashvili was a member of the Bavarian Radio Symphony Orchestra and the Bavarian State Opera. During this membership, he participated with the Bavarian Radio Symphony Orchestra in the complete Beethoven symphony cycle performed and recorded under Mariss Jansons at Suntory Hall in Tokyo in 2012, subsequently released on the NHK label.

In 2016–17, Jashvili served as guest concertmaster and artist in residence with the Beijing Symphony Orchestra, leading the ensemble on tours across the United States and Canada.

As a baroque violinist, he has collaborated with Cecilia Bartoli and the ensemble I Barocchisti (Radio RSI, Switzerland), including in the 2016 production of Bellini's Norma at the Edinburgh International Festival and the Théâtre des Champs-Élysées in Paris.

== Conducting ==
Liana Isakadze — violinist, conductor, and founder of the Night Serenades festival series, held across Borjomi, Gonio, and Batumi — invited Jashvili to perform at several editions of the festival. As chief conductor of the Georgian State Chamber Orchestra, Isakadze subsequently invited Jashvili for his conducting debut with the ensemble — an orchestra founded by Jashvili's aunt, Marine Yashvili, and her husband, violinist Igor Politkovsky. Jashvili has since appeared with the orchestra on multiple occasions as both conductor and soloist.

== Artistic direction and ensemble work ==
In 2015, Jashvili founded the Munich Chamber Soloists, a chamber orchestra drawing on members of major Munich orchestras. He served as artistic director and performed as soloist alongside Joshua Bell at the ensemble's debut concert, including a performance of the Bach Double Violin Concerto. That same year he curated the concert series Starkonzerte in collaboration with Bavaria Klassik, featuring violinist Roman Kim.

In 2017, Jashvili co-produced the Munich festival Stars and Rising Stars, pairing international soloists — including Lisa Batiashvili and Julian Rachlin — with emerging talent.

Opera Without Words is a concert format created by Jashvili in which the violin takes the role of storyteller, giving voice to operatic works without singers. Developed during his tenure in Valencia, the format features arrangements by Richard Whilds of works by Bizet, Puccini, Saint-Saëns, De Falla, and Wagner for solo violin and orchestra.

In 2018, Jashvili served as artistic curator of an edition of the Night Serenades festival in Batumi. He designed the concert programme and invited the participating soloists. Among the concerts he created was a Tango Evening featuring violinist Géza Hosszu-Legocky, guitarist Zsófia Boros, and bandoneonist Mario Stefano Pietrodarchi with the chamber orchestra Georgian Virtuosi in a programme of works by Astor Piazzolla and Ennio Morricone.

== Teaching ==
Jashvili gives regular masterclasses and prepares students for international competitions and orchestral auditions across Asia, including in Japan, China, Singapore, and Indonesia. His students have won prizes at leading international competitions.

As a student, Jashvili was a recipient of the Lina Foundation scholarship in Vienna. He subsequently joined the foundation's faculty as a professor of violin.
