= Michel Yachvili =

France international rugby union player (born 1946)

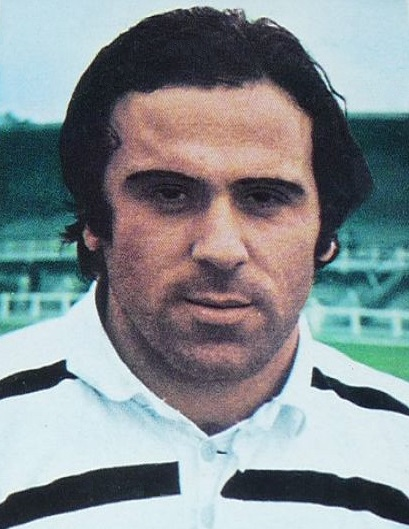
- Born: September 25, 1946 (age 80) Tulle, France
- Height: 1.78 m (5 ft 10 in)
- Weight: 85 kg (187 lb)
- Notable relative: Dimitri Yachvili (son)

Rugby union career
- Position(s): Hooker, flanker
Senior career
Years	Team	Apps	(Points)
1964–1970	SC Tulle		
1975–1977	CA Brive		
International career
Years	Team	Apps	(Points)
1968–1975	France	47	(0)

Michel Yachvili (born 25 September 1946) is a former French rugby union footballer.

His father was a Georgian POW during the World War II in France, and his son Grégoire chose to play for the Georgian national team. He began his career playing as Hooker for SC Tulle. He was a part of the French national team which won the 1968 Grand Slam in the Five Nations. In 1970 he moved to CA Brive where he played flanker.

Yachvili's son, Dimitri Yachvili, is also a France rugby union international.
