= Nana Jashvili =

Georgian classical violinist

Nana Jashvili (Georgian: ნანა იაშვილი; Russian: Нана Яшвили) is a Georgian-born Austrian classical violinist. At the age of 17 she won the Premier Grand Prix at the Long-Thibaud-Crespin Competition in Paris, among the youngest winners in the competition's history; she also received the Prix Spécial for her interpretation of Maurice Ravel's Tzigane. She subsequently won the Concours Musical International de Montréal. She holds the title of People's Artist of the Georgian SSR and performed as a soloist of the Moscow Philharmonia. A representative of the Russian violin school, she studied with Leonid Kogan at the Moscow Conservatory and later served as his assistant. For over thirty years she was a professor of violin at the Folkwang University of the Arts in Essen. After settling in Austria she founded the international chamber orchestra Kammerorchester Arpeggione in Hohenems.

== Early life and education ==
Jashvili was born in Tbilisi, Georgia, into the Jashvili musical family. She began violin studies as a child with her father, professor Luarsab Jashvili (Georgian: Luarsab Iashvili). At the age of 15 she won the All-Caucasian Violin Competition, open to young musicians from the Caucasian republics of the Soviet Union, and in the same year performed as soloist under the baton of Aram Khachaturian.

She studied at the Moscow Conservatory with Leonid Kogan, later serving as his assistant.

== Competition career ==
At age 17, Jashvili won the Premier Grand Prix at the Long-Thibaud-Crespin Competition in Paris, among the youngest winners in the competition's history and the first Georgian laureate. She also received the Prix Spécial for her interpretation of Maurice Ravel's Tzigane. In the 1967 rankings, the other placed violinists were Andrei Korsakov in second place, Teiko Maehashi in third, Jean-Jacques Kantorow in fourth, Tomotada Sō in fifth, and Catherine Courtois in sixth. She also won the Concours Musical International de Montréal.

She holds the title of People's Artist of the Georgian SSR.

== Performance career ==
Jashvili performed in the Soviet Union, Georgia, Europe, Japan, and Canada. She appeared as soloist at major venues and with orchestras including the Concertgebouw in Amsterdam, the Gewandhausorchester Leipzig, the Staatskapelle Dresden, the Orchestre de Paris, the Moscow Philharmonia, and the Saint Petersburg Philharmonic Orchestra.

Her conductor collaborations included Claudio Abbado, Karl Böhm, Aleksandr Dmitriyev, Valery Gergiev, Neeme Järvi, Kirill Kondrashin, Kurt Masur, and Yehudi Menuhin.

Following her competition triumphs and appearances in the West, Jashvili was placed on a Soviet blacklist of artists considered at high risk of defection, barring her from further travel to Western countries. Only with the fall of the Soviet Union was she able to emigrate, moving to Austria in 1989. After her collaboration with Claudio Abbado and through his personal advocacy, she was granted Austrian citizenship under a special government programme providing expedited citizenship to individuals of exceptional cultural value whose presence is considered to be in the national interest.

== Kammerorchester Arpeggione ==
In 1990, Jashvili founded the Kammerorchester Arpeggione in Hohenems, Austria, serving as its artistic founder and permanent soloist. She brought to Hohenems a network of international conductors and soloists from her performing career, and the ensemble was adopted by the City of Hohenems as its municipal chamber orchestra. Among those she invited was Gari Petrenko, who served as concertmaster; it was in Hohenems that Gari's son Kirill Petrenko — later chief conductor of the Berlin Philharmonic — began his international career as a teenager.

== Teaching ==
Jashvili taught at the Folkwang University of the Arts in Essen for over thirty years. Her students hold positions in major German orchestras.

== Family ==
Her son, Gia Jashvili, is an Austrian violinist with an international career as soloist, concertmaster, and pedagogue.

Her sisters are the violinists Irine Jashvili, a professor at the Academy of Arts in Novi Sad, and the well-known violinist Marine Jashvili, a professor at the Moscow Conservatory.

== Instrument ==
Jashvili plays a Nicolo Gagliano violin.
